= Charlie Phillips (photographer) =

Jamaican restaurateur and photographer (born 1944)

Charlie Phillips OBE
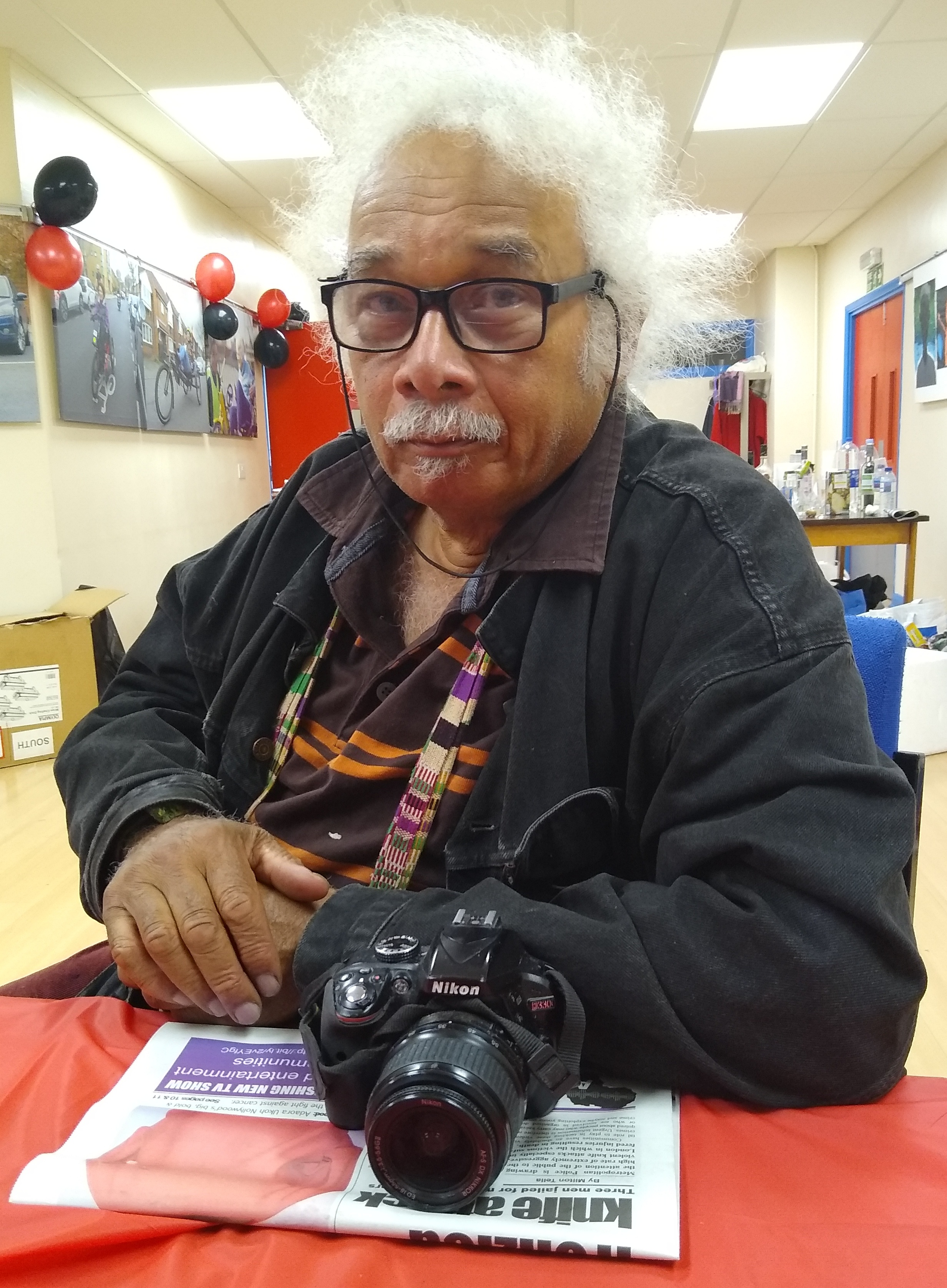
- Phillips in Brixton, 2019
- Born: Ronald Phillips; 22 November 1944 (age 81); Kingston, Jamaica
- Other name: Smokey
- Occupation: Photographer
- Notable work: Notting Hill in the Sixties; How Great Thou Art
- Website: charliephillipsarchive.com

Ronald Phillips OBE (born 22 November 1944), better known as Charlie, also known by the nickname Smokey, is a Jamaican-born restaurateur, photographer, and documenter of black London. He is now best known for his photographs of Notting Hill during the period of West Indian migration to London; however, his subject matter has also included film stars and student protests, with his photographs having appeared in Stern, Harper's Bazaar, Life and Vogue and in Italian and Swiss journals. Notable recent shows by Phillips include How Great Thou Art, "a sensitive photographic documentary of the social and emotional traditions that surround death in London's African Caribbean community".

His work has been exhibited at galleries including Tate Britain, Museum of London, Nottingham's New Art Exchange, Museum of Contemporary Art Detroit and Museum of the City of New York, and is also in collections at The Wedge, London's Victoria & Albert Museum (V&A), as well as the Tate. A portrait of Phillips by photographer Aliyah Otchere was acquired by the National Portrait Gallery, London in 2021.

Phillips was appointed Officer of the Order of the British Empire (OBE) in the 2022 New Year Honours for services to photography and the arts.

== Early years ==
Born in Kingston, Jamaica, Phillips spent his early childhood with his grandparents in St Mary after his parents had migrated to Britain. He developed an early interest in naval matters: "We used to wait for the tour ships to come in and we used to try and sell them something or try and escort them somewhere or show them around Kingston harbour. At that time Kingston was a main shipping port in the Caribbean.... Every afternoon after school I used to go down to the pier and watch different ships coming in. It was the era of big immigration to England." At the age of 11, Phillips too made the journey from Jamaica to England, sailing on the Reina del Pacifico, a Pacific Steam Navigation Company passenger ship: "This was a one of my most memorable experiences.... We visited different ports.... We visited Cuba, Bermuda, and I saw Santander in Spain and we ended up in Plymouth. Ever since then I've had a fascination for ships and docks and the sea."

He joined his parents in London, on 17 August 1956, and the family lived among other West Indian immigrants in Notting Hill, at the time a poor area of the capital characterised by Rachmanism and racism. Phillips recalls: "We lived at number 9 Blenheim Crescent, and we had to share a room with two strangers, in what they called a double room. It was a refuge point for a lot of people who came here and didn't have anywhere to stay at first." He says: "I was an altar boy at a church called St Michael when Kelso Cochrane was buried [on 6 June 1959] – one of the biggest funerals in Notting Hill at the time. It was just after the race riots and because my parents thought there would be trouble that's the only day I didn't go to the procession. These were the days where for coloured people it wasn't safe to walk on the street, especially when Oswald Mosley was at his peak."

Phillips worked in his parents' restaurant "Las Palmas" in Portobello Road. Notwithstanding early dreams to become a naval architect or an opera singer, he began his photographic career by accident when, while still very young, he was given a Kodak Brownie by a black American serviceman. Phillips taught himself to use it ("I bought a book from Boots on how to take photos and learnt from my mistakes") and began to photograph life in Notting Hill, making his prints in the family bathroom after his parents had retired to bed.

== 1960s–1980s ==
After joining the Merchant Navy for a while (serving as a galley boy and developing an interest in marine biology and maritime history), Phillips travelled widely in Europe, to Sweden, Switzerland, France and Italy. Caught up in the protest movements of the late 1960s, he took photographs of the student riots in Paris and Rome. He also took paparazzi-style pictures of celebrities including Omar Sharif, Gina Lollobrigida and Muhammad Ali. After meeting Federico Fellini, Phillips was given work as an extra in the 1969 film Satyricon. He worked as a freelance photographer for magazines — "An agency would take some of my work. You'd get two or three quid, which was survival" — and had his first exhibition in Milan in 1972, entitled Il Frustrazi and portraying the lives of urban migrant workers.

Returning to London after several years, Phillips lived "a bohemian life of squats and pop festivals". Described as "A card carrying member of the 'sex, drugs and rock n roll era'", he ended up at a party where he took photographs of Jimi Hendrix but ironically could get no British news editor to publish them. Throughout the 1960s he documented aspects of urban life in Notting Hill and the shifts taking place in the cultural landscape, including racial integration and the birth of Carnival.

Throughout the 1980s, Phillips regularly took photographs that document West Indian funerals, at Kensal Green Cemetery and elsewhere, which have been collected together under the title How Great Thou Art: 50 Years of Afro-Caribbean Funerals. In 1988, he moved to south London and opened a diner at 131 Wandsworth High Street, Wandsworth, called Smokey Joe's, which often featured in restaurant guides, running it for 11 years, while building up a collection of shipping memorabilia but not pursuing his career as a photographer, demoralised by not being able to get his work published.

== 1990s–present ==
=== Notting Hill in the Sixties ===
A revival of interest in the work of Charlie Phillips came with it being featured in an exhibition at the Tabernacle, Notting Hill, in 1991, coinciding with the launch of his book of photographs Notting Hill in the Sixties. Introduced by writer Mike Phillips (no relation), the book includes photographs of everyday life in the area, covering poor housing conditions, musical entertainment and political activism.

=== The Urban Eye ===
Curator Paul Goodwin, speaking of the work in the 2013 exhibition Charlie Phillips: The Urban Eye (a 2014 Deutsche Börse Photography Prize nomination), compared Phillips' significance to that of documentary photographers such as Markéta Luskačová, Shirley Baker and Tom Wood, saying: "Each photograph tells 'other' stories...about the rise of modern multicultural London and the migrant experience in the city." Reviewing the exhibition in the Nottingham Post, Mark Patterson called it "a reminder of a London and an England that has almost been wiped out of existence by redevelopment; a country where the business-driven 'regeneration' imperative has squeezed out authenticity and local texture. And for London, read Nottingham and many other towns and cities."

=== How Great Thou Art: 50 Years of African Caribbean Funerals in London ===
Phillips' show How Great Thou Art: 50 Years of African Caribbean Funerals in London opened in November 2014 at Photofusion Gallery in Brixton, curated by Eddie Otchere and Lizzy King, with support from Arts Council England's Grants for the Arts Fund.

Hungry Eye magazine stated: "Photographer Charlie Phillips presents a sensitive photographic documentary of the social and emotional traditions that surround death in London's African Caribbean community. How Great Thou Art represents a lifetime's work by Charlie." The reviewer for The Root praised the exhibition as "a collection of beautifully evocative, powerfully elegiac images", describing Phillips as "a rare breed who combines the adventurous, pioneering spirit and perennial resilience of the hardy immigrant (he came to Britain in the 1950s) with the sensitive eye of the aesthete and a longing to transmute the banal, the prosaic and the unpalatable in ordinary existence into a thing of ineffable beauty."

Accompanying the publication of a limited-edition book of the same title (successfully funded by Kickstarter), How Great Thou Art has been called "a new landmark in British photography. The question of life and death and the cultural responses to death through funerals in the Caribbean community has featured sporadically in various photographic oeuvres before but no one has explored this subject in such depth and in such a participatory and embedded manner as evidenced by Charlie Phillips." In The Spectator, Ian Thomson wrote: "In Phillips's moving and often beautiful images, dating from 1962 to the present, the bereaved are seen to face the mystery of the end of life in stush black suits, spidery hat veils, Rastafari head-ties, spiffy trilbies and strictly-come-dancehall white socks.... Anyone feeling a bit like death in the run-up to Christmas should invest in a copy of How Great Thou Art — and feel revivified."

In October 2023, How Great Thou Art opened in Mayfair, central London, at the Centre for British Photography, the first time a solo exhibition has been presented in main space there.

=== Heart of the Community ===
Phillips is featured in the art installation by Peter Dunn commissioned by the Royal Borough of Kensington and Chelsea on the Portobello Road north wall, in a series of photomurals celebrating key personalities, history and events of the Golborne and Portobello area over the past hundred years.

=== Charlie Phillips Take Over ===
On 17 June 2017, Phillips was guest curator at Black Cultural Archives for the day, to celebrate the forthcoming launch of the Charlie Phillips Roots Archive.

== Exhibitions ==
- 1991: Notting Hill in the Sixties. The Tabernacle, London
- 2003: Through London's Eyes: Photographs by Charlie Phillips, Museum of London.
- 2004: Notting Hill in the Sixties, The Black Hidden History and Heritage of Kensington and Chelsea. Chelsea Library, London
- 2005–06: Roots to Reckoning, Photographs by Charlie Phillips, Neil Kenlock and Armet Francis, Museum of London. Comprising 90 photographs of London's black community in the 1960s–80s, the Roots to Reckoning archive was subsequently acquired by the Museum of London.
- 2013: Charlie Phillips: The Urban Eye, New Art Exchange, Nottingham.
- 2013: Shouting from the Sixties, Film's not Dead, Mount Pleasant, London.
- 2014: How Great Thou Art: 50 Years of African Caribbean Funerals in London. Photofusion, London (7 November – 5 December 2014).
- 2015: Staying Power: Photographs of Black British Experience, 1950s – 1990s, Black Cultural Archives, Brixton (January – June 2015), and V&A Museum, London (February and May 2015) — includes images by Charlie Phillips.
- 2015: Simon Schama's Face of Britain, National Portrait Gallery (NPG), London (September 2015 – January 2016). The programme of events complementing the exhibition included "Charlie Phillips: The Unseen Photographs", a conversation with Phillips and Eddie Otchere at the NPG on 3 December 2015, when "not only was every seat taken but the crowd that spilled out on to the stairs also joined in giving [Phillips] a standing ovation at the end of his presentation."
- 2017: How Great Thou Art: Documenting 50 years of Caribbean funerals in London, The Tabernacle (2 November 2017 to 5 November 2017). Q&A with Alex Pascall, 5 November.
- 2021: Life Between Islands: Caribbean-British Art 1950s–Now, Tate Britain (December 2021–3 April 2022)
- 2022: Grove Survivors, The Muse Gallery, 8–24 April 2022
- 2023: How Great Thou Art – 50 Years of African Caribbean Funerals in London, Centre for British Photography, Jermyn Street, St. James's, London (5 October–17 December)
- 2026: Somewhere, Somehow, Riverside Studios, London (16 January–9 March)

== Notable works and recognition ==
Phillips' 1967 photo "Notting Hill Couple" appears on the cover of the CD London Is the Place for Me Vol. 2: Calypso Kwela Highlife and Jazz from Young Black London (Honest Jon's Records). It also featured in Staying Power: Photographs of Black British Experience, 1950–1990s, a collaborative exhibition by Black Cultural Archives and the Victoria and Albert Museum (V&A), and in the National Portrait Gallery's 2015 exhibition Face of Britain. In March 2016 the photograph was selected by Time Out as one of "The 40 best photos of London ever taken", and was described by the magazine as "a picture that speaks volumes about London living and loving".

Publications in which his photographs are reproduced include Carnival: A Photographic and Testimonial History of the Notting Hill Carnival (Rice N Peas Books, 2014), which followed from a 2011 exhibition of Notting Hill Carnival photographs curated by Ishmahil Blagrove that featured work by Phillips among others at The Tabernacle.

The exhibition Charlie Phillips: The Urban Eye, curated by Paul Goodwin at New Art Exchange, Nottingham, was longlisted for the Deutsche Börse Photography Prize 2014.

Simon Schama, in an extract published in The Guardian from his book The Face of Britain, which features images from the National Portrait Gallery's collection, describes Phillips as "a visual poet; chronicler, champion, witness of a gone world ... one of Britain's great photo-portraitists", reproducing "Notting Hill Couple" alongside the article.

Phillips has been called: "Arguably the most important (yet least lauded) black British photographer of his generation", and a January 2015 feature in Time Out London referred to him as "the greatest London photographer you've never heard of – and some of his best works are only just being discovered".

In 2017, Phillips appeared on the BBC Radio 3 programme Private Passions, his musical choices including works by Verdi, Puccini, Dave Brubeck, Scott Joplin, in addition to the hymn "How Great Thou Art".

In the 2022 New Year Honours, Phillips was appointed an OBE.

In February 2022, Phillips headed CasildART's list of the top six Black British photographers, alongside James Barnor, Armet Francis, Neil Kenlock, Pogus Caesar and Vanley Burke.

In February 2026 a retrospective edition of his images from 1962 to 2010 was published as Charlie Phillips - A Grassroots Legacy 1962 – 2010. The book, published by Bluecoat Press, includes a preface by Paul Goodwin and an introduction by Cecil Gutzmore.

== Film and television appearances ==
Rootical, a film by Nike Hatzidimon about Phillips' life, won the Best First Film Award at the Portobello Film Festival in 2006.

Phillips' life and work was covered in Neighbourhood Tales: Black And White, broadcast in October 2003, in Channel Four's Neighbourhood Tales slot.

== Publications ==
- 1991: Notting Hill in the Sixties, London: Lawrence and Wishart. Photography by Charlie Phillips, words by Mike Phillips. ISBN 0-85315-751-0
- 2005: Roots to Reckoning. The photography of: Armet Francis, Neil Kenlock, Charlie Phillips. Seed Publications. Exhibition catalogue with introduction by Mike Phillips. ISBN 0-95105-988-2
- 2014: How Great Thou Art: 50 Years of African Caribbean Funerals in London. London: King/Otchere Productions, 2014. Edited by Lizzy King, with Preface by Mandingo, Foreword by Paul Goodwin, Essays by Empressjai, Michael McMillan, Sireita Lawrence-Mullings and Eddie Otchere. ISBN 978-0-9927117-1-9
- 2015: "Black, White and Colour" in The Face of Britain: The Nation through Its Portraits by Simon Schama. London: Penguin. ISBN 9780241963715.
- 2017: Notting Hill in the 60s, Café Royal Books.
- 2022: Charlie Phillips: a Grassroots Legacy: 1962–2010, Bluecoat. With an introduction by Cecil Gutzmore and a preface by Paul Goodwin. ISBN 978-1-908457-92-9.

== Charlie Phillips Heritage Archive project ==
A website featuring an online archive of Phillips' photographs, curated by Eddie Otchere and with National Lottery funding, was launched in January 2018 as part of the Charlie Phillips Heritage Archive project. In 2021, the Southbank Centre presented a selection of work entitled The Charlie Phillips Archive, together with a short film (which also featured Eddie Otchere).
