= Jade Montserrat =

English artist and writer

Jade de Montserrat is a research-led artist and writer based in Scarborough, North Yorkshire. She makes visual and live artworks that explore race and the vulnerabilities of bodies, the tactile and sensory qualities of language and challenge the structures of care in institutions.

== Early life and education ==
Born in 1981, Montserrat grew up in rural Yorkshire with her mother and stepfather. She studied History of Art at the Courtauld Institute of Art from 2000 to 2003 and gained a MA in Drawing at Norwich University School of Art and Design, from 2008 to 2010, and was a Stuart Hall PhD scholar at the Institute of Black Atlantic Research, School of Art, Design and Performance at the University of Central Lancashire starting in 2017 with a thesis on 'Race and Representation in Northern Britain in the context of the Black Atlantic: A Creative Practice Project'.

== Career ==
Montserrat works collaboratively with artist and performance collectives including Network 11, Press Room, the Conway Cohort, Rainbow Tribe: Affectionate Movement and Ecology of Care Bureau. Selected screenings, performances and presentations include: Arnolfini, and Spike Island, Bristol (2017), Alison Jacques Gallery (2017), Princeton University (2016).

She is the recipient of the Jerwood Drawing Prize student award (2017) for 'No Need for Clothing', a documentary photograph of a drawing installation at Cooper Gallery DJCAD by Jacquetta Clark.

Montserrat has been a visiting artist at the University of Brighton, Camberwell College of Arts, Goldsmith, Leeds Beckett, and visiting lecturer at the University of Reading, Robert Gordon University in Aberdeen and King's College.

In February 2020 Montserrat became the first artist to be commissioned under the Future Collect project managed by INIVA, a scheme to support museums and galleries to commission artists of African and/or Asian descent.

== Exhibitions ==
- 'Instituting Care' at Humber Street Gallery, 20 July – 1 September 2019 and The Bluecoat, 17 November – 31 March 2019. This exhibition was part of the artist's practice-led PHD 'Race and Representation in Northern Britain in the context of the Black Atlantic: A Creative Practice Project'. The work consisted of a rustic pod – constructed from wood, hung with foil and blankets and filled with the artist's own books- sitting within a gallery space in which the walls have been entirely covered with words and phrases drawn in charcoal. The words and phrases drawn on the wall were drawn from the artist's bibliography of texts for her thesis. The artist drew directly onto the gallery walls over a period of days - part of a durational performance called No Need for Clothing.
- Jade Montserrat, Stuart Hall Library, Iniva, 1 Jan – 29 Feb 2020 an exhibition of 20 small colourful works on paper, many using texts drawn from writers including bell hooks and Sara Ahmed.

== Selected works ==
- "Love.Love?", performance, "Rural Assembly" at Wysing Arts Centre
- T'Anthem', IPAF, Warehouse 9, Copenhagen
- "Revue", SPILL Festival of Performance in October 2018
- THE ANNOTATED READER 9b Cork Street Galleries, London
- Art on the Underground, Transport for London Night Tube Map commission
- "4717" – The Royal College of Art Contemporary Curating Art Show, record recode
- The Last Place They Thought Of, ICA, Philadelphia
- No Need For Clothing, Slow Sunday, Steakhouse Live, Arts Admin, University of Bath, Castlefield Gallery 2018
