= Mahtab Hussain =

British fine art portrait photographer (born 1981)

Mahtab Hussain (born 1981) is a British fine art portrait photographer whose work comments on cultural differences. His bodies of work include You Get Me?, about issues of identity in working class British Asian young men and boys; Going Back Home to Where I Came From, photographs of Kashmir and Pakistan where his parents are from; and Honest With You about the changing identity of British Muslim women.

His work has been published in four books, is held in the collection of the Museum of Fine Arts, Houston, and has been shown in solo exhibitions at mac and Ikon Gallery in Birmingham, New Art Exchange in Nottingham, Impressions Gallery in Bradford, and The New Art Gallery Walsall.

Hussain is of Kashmiri / Pakistani origin.

== Life and work ==
Hussain's parents were first generation Muslim immigrants, his mother from a small village in Azad Kashmir and his father from Gujar Khan, Punjab. Hussain was born in Glasgow in 1981 then moved to Birmingham in 1987 when his parents divorced. In Birmingham he lived with his mother for two years in Handsworth, "a very black and Asian area" then with his father in Druids Heath, the only Asian family in a predominantly white working class area on the edge of Birmingham. He "suffered intense racism" in Druids Heath from the age of seven to 17. His father was also both macho and very violent. At 17 he "fled his father's home", moving back in with his mother, whom he had lost contact with, in Handsworth.

At the suggestion of his mother, he reconnected with the Asian community, studying art at Joseph Chamberlain Sixth Form College, which had a majority uptake of Muslim/Pakistani students. His Asian contemporaries at college practised their faith and many of the men associated themselves with the black urban experience. Here he was also ridiculed, this time for being too British. Unsure if he was British or Pakistani, he had an identity crisis.

Hussain moved to London, studied art history at Goldsmiths College then worked at the National Portrait Gallery. He struggled to find artistic work that reflected his experiences as a British Asian, so in 2010 he became an artist "to help bridge this gap"—as he explains:

"I've never seen myself on a billboard. I've never seen a model dressed the way these guys dress. I think the level of shit that's been built up–the narrative that we have about ourselves, which we have no control of–has left us fucking pissed off, and rightly so. I feel so invisible. That's why I became an artist. I wanted to represent this society in artistic space."

He spent nine years between 2008 and 2017 making his first body of work You Get Me?, mostly portraits, of working class, British Asian, young men and boys, all Muslims, in Nottingham, Birmingham and London. The work explores concepts of identity, masculinity, and marginalisation "within that community, and in a broader sense the issues of male redundancy in the working classes, and the psychological damage of sweeping media generalisations". Of post-9/11 Islamophobia he has said:

"9/11, happened in 2001, that was 17 years ago. These young men who are now in their early twenties have had to endure a plethora of attacks from the media and government since then. And all they know is that this country hates them. That they are criminals, a terrorist, an Isis sympathisers, a threat to society, sexual groomers, who beat their women and quite possibly may one day kill their own sisters in the name of ‘honour’."

The young men shown in You Get Me? are stuck between being made to feel they do not belong in the UK, and were they to go to Pakistan for example, would be told they do not belong there "because of the way they dress, their mannerisms, their identity." Hussain's series depicts how many of them "connect with the black urban experience, and in particular, hip-hop which talks about poverty, hopelessness and the struggles of life, it gives them a sense of collective belonging in Western society."

Another series, Going Back Home to Where I Came From, depicts aspects of a life he may have led in Kashmir and Pakistan had his parents not emigrated from there.

His series Honest With You is about the changing identity of British Muslim women. It tries to show how the women are faring better with the changes than their male contemporaries.

Hussain finds his subjects by walking around and approaching people on the street.

== Publications ==
- The Commonality Of Strangers. Nottingham: New Art Exchange. ISBN 978-0-9560253-8-8. Published in conjunction with an exhibition at New Art Exchange.
- The Quiet Town of Tipton. West Bromwich: Mulitstory; Stockport, UK: Dewi Lewis, 2015. ISBN 978-1-907893-72-8. Edition of 500 copies.
- You Get Me?. London: Mack, 2017. ISBN 978-1-910164-84-6.
- Going Back Home to Where I Came From. Birmingham: Ikon Gallery, 2017. ISBN 9781911155133. Edited by Jonathan Watkins. With texts by Hussain, Josiah McNeil, Frank Uekötter and Jonathan Watkins.

== Solo exhibitions ==
- Building Desires, Subway Gallery, London, September–October 2011.
- What Does it Mean to be a British Pakistani Male Today?, mac, Birmingham, April–October 2012.
- The Commonality of Strangers, New Art Exchange, Nottingham, January–April 2015; Strange Cargo, Folkestone, October–December 2015.
- Mitti Ka Ghar – Clay House, Ikon Gallery, Birmingham, October–November 2016.
- You Get Me?, Autograph ABP, London, May–July 2017.
- You Get Me?, Impressions Gallery, Bradford, January–March 2018.
- Going Back Home to Where I Came From, The New Art Gallery Walsall, May–September 2018. Also Mitti Ka Ghar, May 2018 – February 2019.

== Television and radio programmes ==
- "Mahtab Hussain: Honest with You", Snapshots, Episode 4, Series 1 – BBC Radio 4 programme broadcast 18 December 2017
- "Mahtab Hussain", What Do Artists Do All Day? – BBC Four TV programme broadcast 16 August 2018

== Collections ==
Hussain's work is held in the following public collections:

- Museum of Fine Arts, Houston, TX: 3 prints (as of August 2018)
