= Kimathi Donkor =

British artist (born 1965)

- Born: 1965 (age 60–61); Bournemouth, England
- Education: Bournemouth and Poole College of Arts; Goldsmiths College, University of London; Camberwell College of Arts; Chelsea College of Arts
- Occupation: Artist

Kimathi Donkor (born in 1965) is a London-based contemporary British artist whose paintings are known for their exploration of global, black histories. His work is exhibited and collected by international museums, galleries and biennials including London's National Portrait Gallery, the British Museum, the Diaspora Pavilion at the 57th Venice Biennial, the 29th São Paulo Art Biennial and the 15th Sharjah Biennial. He is of Ghanaian, Anglo-Jewish and Jamaican family heritage, and his figurative paintings depict "African diasporic bodies and souls as sites of heroism and martydom, empowerment and fragility...myth and matter".

== Early life and education ==
Kimathi Donkor was born in Bournemouth, England, in 1965. He has said of his background: "I was born in the UK to an Anglo-Jewish mother and Ghanaian father, but was raised by my adopted parents who were from Jamaica and the UK. We lived for a time in Zambia, Central Africa, where my adopted dad worked as a vet. I finished my schooling in the west of England, then moved to London, where I eventually settled. In the meantime, my adopted parents had divorced and remarried, so the family diversity actually increased, as Zambians also joined the party. This smörgåsbord life induced an early sense of the wondrous, and sometimes maddening, complexity of identities and histories, which, I think, has been reflected in my artworks. Precisely because I was such an intimate witness to the multiple crossings and re-crossings of stories, images and journeys from around the world."

Donkor received an art foundation diploma from Bournemouth and Poole College of Arts followed by a BA in fine art from Goldsmiths College, University of London, and a master's in fine art at Camberwell College of Arts. He earned his PhD at Chelsea College of Arts in 2016. He also participated in community education initiatives such as Black History for Action. In 2011, he was the recipient of the Derek Hill Foundation Scholarship for the British School at Rome.

== Career and works ==
Donkor's paintings have featured in prominent international exhibitions, including at London's National Portrait Gallery, the 15th Sharjah Biennial, UAE, the Dulwich Picture Gallery, the 29th São Paulo Art Biennial, the Institute of Contemporary Arts, the Charles H. Wright Museum of African American History and the International Slavery Museum. Examples of his art are held by significant international public and private collections, including at the British Museum, the International Slavery Museum, Wolverhampton Art Gallery, the Sharjah Art Foundation, the collection of CCH Pounder and the Shariat Collection.

=== Black history paintings ===
Donkor's artwork is primarily known for his figurative paintings about significant people and events from Black history. Sunday Times art critic, Waldemar Januszczak noted that "As a genre, history painting has remembrance and societal education as its chief objectives. Donkor adds unexpected lyricism and delicacy to the mix". And, writing for Third Text in 2023, critic Akin Oladimeji described Donkor's 2004 painting Toussaint L’Ouverture at Bedourete as a "Highly atmospheric... haunting work" that depicted renowned freedom fighter Toussaint L'Ouverture as "devoid of doubt, resolute and determined to bring about the end of slavery with his men clearly ready to die by his side." In an analysis of the 2005 painting Coldharbour Lane: 1985, art historian Eddie Chambers asserted that Donkor's history paintings "fearlessly tackle key, dramatic, monumental moments of African diaspora history ... with a painterly preciseness that borders on aesthetic frugality". And, according to art critic Coline Milliard, Donkor's works are "genuine cornucopias of interwoven reference: to Western art, social and political events, and to the artist's own biography". In 2005, Time Out magazine reported that officers from London's Metropolitan Police had entered the Bettie Morton Gallery to demand the removal of one of the artist's paintings, Helping With Enquiries (1984), from his solo exhibition Fall/Uprising (which addressed policing controversies). Gallery staff refused to comply and police later issued a statement that "no further action" would be taken against the painter.

The artist's "Queens of the Undead" paintings depict historic female commanders from Africa and the African Diaspora, but with contemporary Londoners as models. Prior to featuring in Donkor's 2012 solo show at London's Institute of International Visual Arts (Iniva), works from the series were exhibited at the Ciccillo Matarazzo Pavilion in São Paulo, Brazil, for the 29th São Paulo Biennial in 2010.

Caroline Menezes suggested that Donkor's work, "articulates a hidden history, tales of the past and chronicles of suppressed voices", with figures such as Nanny of the Maroons, Nzinga Mbande, Stephen Lawrence, Joy Gardner, Toussaint L'Ouverture and Jean Charles de Menezes among the subjects addressed. Writing about his 2013, London solo show, Daddy, I want to be a black artist, Yvette Greslé proposed Donkor as “one of the most significant figurative painters, of his generation, working in the United Kingdom today”. In 2017, writing about his work at the Diaspora Pavilion during the 57th Venice Biennale, Phil Brett noted that Donkor, "known for his dramatic figurative art of key moments of black history, whether the subject is the murder of Stephen Lawrence or Nanny of the Maroons leading slave rebellions in Jamaica, has a direct style, which never tries to over-complicate". In 2019 he won the DiLonghi Art Projects Artists Award at the London Art Fair.

== Curating and art teaching ==
In 2008, Donkor was commissioned to curate the touring group show Hawkins & Co at Liverpool's Contemporary Urban Centre, featuring 70 works by 15 artists, including Raimi Gbadamosi, Keith Piper, George "Fowokan" Kelly and Chinwe Chukwuogo Roy MBE. The show, which toured to Liverpool from London, marked the bicentenary of Parliament's Act to Abolition the Slave Trade. In 2009, Donkor embarked on a three-year project at Tate Britain, Seeing Through, which engaged a group of young people from London foster homes in producing and exhibiting art at the museum. Dr Donkor is a Reader in Black Art and Contemporary Painting at the University of the Arts, London and in 2019 was appointed as Course Leader for the BA (Hons) in Painting at Camberwell College of Arts.

== Solo exhibitions ==
- 2004: Caribbean Passion: Haiti 1804, Bettie Morton Gallery, London
- 2005: Caribbean Passion: Haiti 1804, Art Exchange Gallery (touring), Nottingham
- 2005: Fall/Uprising, Bettie Morton Gallery, London
- 2008: Hawkins & Co, Market Theatre Gallery, Armagh, Northern Ireland
- 2012: Queens of the Undead, with InIVA at Rivington Place, London
- 2013: Daddy, I want to be a black artist, Peckham Space, London
- 2015: Some Clarity of Vision, Gallery MOMO, Johannesburg
- 2021: Idylls DKUK, London
- 2021: Notebooks Brixton Library, London
- 2022: Play, Rest, Work, University College London Hospital, London, England
- 2023: On Episode Seven Holland Park Billboard, London
- 2023: Helix/Idyl, Niru Ratnam Gallery, London
- 2024: Black History Painting, Niru Ratnam Gallery, London

== Selected group exhibitions ==
- 2024: "The Time is Always Now Artists Reframe the Black Figure", National Portrait Gallery, London, England (Curated by Ekow Eshun).
- 2024: "Soulscapes", Dulwich Picture Gallery, London, England (Curated by Lisa Anderson).
- 2023: "Sharjah Biennial 15: Thinking Historically in the Present", Sharjah Art Museum, Sharjah, UAE (Curated by Hoor Al Qasimi).
- 2022–23: "The New African Portraiture. Shariat Collections", Krems, Austria (Curated by Ekow Eshun).
- 2021: "UNTITLED: Art on the conditions of our time", Kettle's Yard, Cambridge, England (Curated by Paul Goodwin with Guy Haywood).
- 2021: "War Inna Babylon: The Community's Struggle for Truths and Rights", Institute of Contemporary Arts, London, England (Curated by Stafford Scott, Kamara Scott and Rianna Jade Parker).
- 2021: "QUEEN: From the Collection of CCH Pounder", the Charles H. Wright Museum of African American History Detroit, US
- 2019: "London Art Fair", Business Design Centre, London, England (Presented by Ed Cross Fine Art).
- 2018: "Diaspora Pavilion: Venice to Wolverhampton", Wolverhampton Art Gallery, Wolverhampton, England (curated by David A. Bailey and Jess Taylor)
- 2018: "A History of Drawing", Camberwell Space, London, England (curated by Kelly Chorpening).
- 2017: "Diaspora Pavilion", Venice Biennale, Palazzo Pisani S. Marina, Venice, Italy (curated by David A. Bailey and Jess Taylor).
- 2017–18: "Ink And Blood", International Slavery Museum, Liverpool, England (curated by Jean Francois Manicom).
- 2017: "Untitled: Art on the Conditions of Our Time", New Art Exchange, Nottingham, England (curated by Paul Goodwin and Hansi Momodu-Gordon)
- 2013: ''Entre Trânsitos e Viagens'', Carpintaria São Lazaro, Lisbon, Portugal
- 2013: What's Going On, The Usher Gallery, Lincoln, UK
- 2012: Invisible Forces, Furtherfield, London
- 2011: Seven Things To Do In An Emergency, The British School at Rome, Rome, Italy
- 2010: 29th Bienal de São Paulo, São Paulo, Brazil
- 2008: Hawkins & Co, Contemporary Urban Centre, Liverpool, UK
- 2004: Historicism, 198 Contemporary Arts and Learning, London
- 1985: Young, Black & Here, People's Gallery, London
- 1985: Artists Against Apartheid, Royal Festival Hall, London
