= James Barnor =

Ghanaian photographer (born 1929)

James Barnor Hon. FRPS, OV
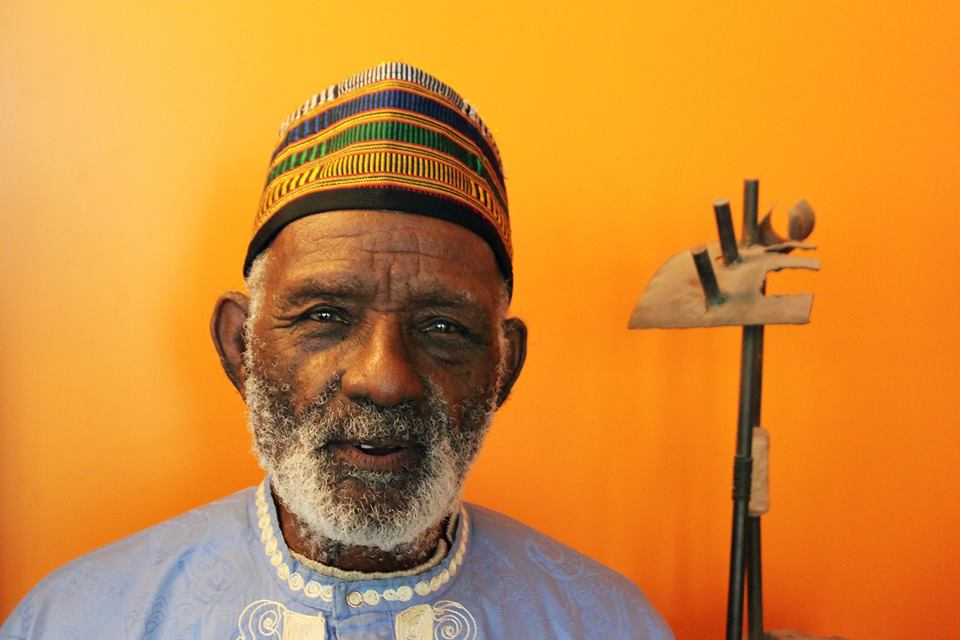
- Barnor in Leiden, Netherlands (2016)
- Born: Frederick Seton James Barnor; 6 June 1929 (age 97); Accra, Gold Coast (now Ghana)
- Occupation: Photographer
- Known for: Street and studio photography
- Awards: GUBA (Ghana UK-Based Achievement), 2016
- Website: www.jamesbarnor.org

James Barnor Hon. FRPS, OV (born 6 June 1929) is a Ghanaian photographer who has been based in London since the 1990s. His career spans six decades, and although for much of that period his work was not widely known, it has latterly been discovered by new audiences. In his street and studio photography, Barnor represents societies in transition in the 1950s and 1960s: Ghana moving toward independence, and London becoming a multicultural metropolis. He has said: "I was lucky to be alive when things were happening...when Ghana was going to be independent and Ghana became independent, and when I came to England the Beatles were around. Things were happening in the 60s, so I call myself Lucky Jim." He was Ghana's first full-time newspaper photographer in the 1950s, and he is credited with introducing colour processing to Ghana in the 1970s. It has been said: "James Barnor is to Ghana and photojournalism what Ousmane Sembène was to Senegal and African cinema."

Barnor has spoken of how his work was rediscovered in 2007 during the "Ghana at 50" jubilee season by curator Nana Oforiatta-Ayim, who organised the first exhibition of his photographs at Black Cultural Archives (BCA). Appreciation of his work as a studio portraitist, photojournalist and Black lifestyle photographer has been further heightened since 2010 when a major solo retrospective exhibition of his photographs, Ever Young: James Barnor, was mounted at Rivington Place, London, followed by a series of exhibitions including in the United States and South Africa. His photographs were collated by the non-profit agency Autograph ABP during a four-year project funded by the Heritage Lottery Fund and in 2011 became part of the new Archive and Research Centre for Culturally Diverse Photography.

Barnor's photographs have also in recent years had showings in Ghana, France (Paris Photo 2011, Galerie Baudoin Lebon; Galerie Clémentine de la Féronnière), The Netherlands. The first monograph of his work, entitled James Barnor: Ever Young, was published in 2015, including an extensive conversation between Barnor and Margaret Busby with Francis Hodgson.

== Early years ==
Frederick Seton James Barnor was born in Accra, in what was then the Gold Coast, West Africa. Giving an insight on how he came to choose his career, he said: "Photography was in my family. My two uncles were photographers. My cousin was a photographer, and I found out later when I got into it that another cousin was also a photographer."

At the age of 17, Barnor was teaching basket weaving at a missionary school and the headmaster gave him a camera "to play around with––it was a Kodak Brownie 127, made of plastic". In 1947, Barnor started an apprenticeship with his cousin J. P. Dodoo, a well-known portrait photographer, "mostly taking pictures of people because when you take pictures of flowers and places there's nobody to pay for them. I did that for two years but I had always wanted to be a policeman. I applied to be a police photographer and was accepted, but before I could start my training my uncle gave me the camera he used for photography."

== Ever Young Studio ==
After finishing the apprenticeship he set up his own freelance photographic practice ("I did a lot of developing and printing for friends, as well as taking photos. I called my company FS James Barnor's Quick Photo Service — FS are my initials, for Frederick Seton. If you bring me the negatives, you will get the photos the next day.") in a makeshift street studio in the Jamestown area of the capital, using a backdrop outside his rented room. When his landlord wanted to reclaim the room, from 1953 Barnor began to operate his Ever Young Studio. Its name derives from the subject of an English comprehension extract he had studied as a schoolboy, entitled "Iduna's Grove", about a Norse goddess giving out magic apples to grant eternal youthfulness; it was also an allusion to the expected practice of retouching sitters' faces to perfection — "Long before Photoshop existed you would use a pencil. I would retouch the pictures to make people look younger."

Located close to the once-famous Seaview Hotel, the studio "soon drew a mixture of clients from families to night revellers and dignitaries". Among those whom he photographed were Ghana's future first president Kwame Nkrumah (pictured kicking a football in one of Barnor's shots), pan-Africanist politician J. B. Danquah, Sir Charles Arden-Clarke (last British governor of the Gold Coast), the Duchess of Kent and then U.S. Vice President Richard Nixon (when he attended Ghana's Independence ceremony in March 1957), as well as boxing champion Roy Ankrah.

== Photojournalism with Daily Graphic and Drum ==
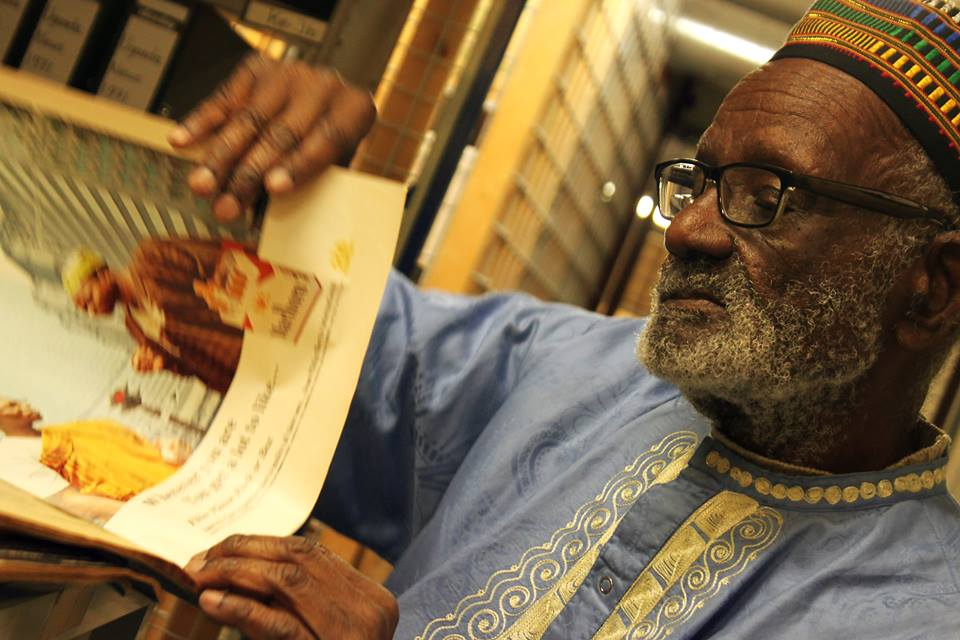
Barnor looking through Drum magazine

At the same time as freelancing, Barnor became the first staff photographer employed by the Daily Graphic newspaper when it was established in Ghana in 1950 by Cecil King of the London Daily Mirror Group. Barnor also sold photographs to other publications, notably the South African magazine Drum, which covered news, politics and entertainment. Drum was founded in 1951 by Jim Bailey, with whom Barnor established an ongoing relationship, using the magazine's Fleet Street office as his base when he first went to London.

== 1960s in the UK ==
In December 1959, Barnor travelled to England to develop his skills, working at Colour Processing Laboratories Ltd, Edenbridge, Kent, and attending evening and other part-time classes before being awarded a Ghana Cocoa Marketing Board scholarship to study full-time at Medway College of Art in Rochester, Kent, graduating in 1961. Subsequent to this course, he stayed on in the UK and continued working as a photographer and technician. His images from this period document Africans in Britain, notably his work as a fashion photographer with black models against London backdrops, often for the covers of Drum, then the leading magazine in Africa.

== 1970–94 ==
After a decade in England, Barnor went back to Ghana, where he set up the country's first colour processing facilities. For the following 24 years in Ghana, he worked as a professional photographer and was the official African representative for Agfa-Gevaert (at the time the leading company for imaging technology). He was also given work by the American embassy, the US Information Service in Ghana in the 1970s and Ghanaian government agencies under the auspices of J. J. Rawlings.

== Return to London: 1994–present ==
In 1994, Barnor returned to London, where his work latterly began to be discovered by a new wider audience, through exhibitions at venues such as Black Cultural Archives (2007), Rivington Place (2010), and elsewhere.

"At the age of 79, I was recognised," he told his audience at a talk at Chelsea Theatre in 2013. His 85th birthday in June 2014 was marked with a showcase of his work in the London Borough of Hounslow, where he lives in sheltered accommodation in Brentford, West London. Barnor continues to exhibit and give talks on his work, including in 2016 at the V&A (as part of the Paul Strand photography and film exhibition season), at Photonook Bristol and at the October Gallery. He said in a 2019 interview: "Sometimes the more you give, the more you get. That's why I'm still going at 90!"

He has set up a UK-registered charity, The James Barnor Foundation, to achieve various aims that are close to his heart, including "education and training, promoting and advocating for the preservation of African cultures, and highlighting African cultural talents." In 2022, the Foundation's launching initiative was a prize to promote established photographers from the African continent, and the first edition, which focused on West Africa, was won by Sènami Donoumassou.

== Exhibitions ==
In 2007, the interest taken in his work by Nana Oforiatta Ayim led to Barnor's first show; he has said: "She was the first curator/ writer to organize a show of my work, and she is the first one who suggested I should do a book." From 24 April to 24 June 2007, the exhibition entitled Mr Barnor's Independence Diaries took place at the Black Cultural Archives (BCA), curated by Oforiatta-Ayim, as part of BCA's Ghana Jubilee Season.

In spring 2010, Barnor's first US exhibition was presented by Autograph ABP in association with the W. E. B. Du Bois Institute in Boston at the Rudenstine Gallery, Hutchins Center for African & African American Research, Harvard University.

The first major solo retrospective exhibition of Barnor's photographs, Ever Young: James Barnor, was mounted at Rivington Place in London from September to November 2010, curated by Renée Mussai of Autograph ABP's Archive and Research Centre. Documenting life in Ghana from the late 1940s to 1950s, and African life during London's "Swinging Sixties" (famous faces include Muhammad Ali, who defended his world heavyweight title against Brian London at Earl's Court in 1966) as well as later decades, the exhibition received wide and favourable coverage within the UK media. As one reviewer noted, "The pictures have become slices of history, documenting race and modernity in the post-colonial world." For art historian Kobena Mercer,

"Barnor captures the mood of a nation on the cusp of self-determination ... Cutting across the divide between periphery and metropolis, Barnor's images suggest that 'Africa' has never been a static entity, confined to the boundaries of geography, but has always had a diasporic dimension ...

The rediscovery of Barnor's images today reveals how photographs have a diasporic life of their own. By virtue of mechanical reproduction, which undercuts the distinction between the original and the copy, photographs are vulnerable to a process of decontextualisation – making them orphans, thrown into the world without a fixed 'home'. But in the research process of retrieval and reassembly that has unified Barnor's disparate images into a holistic body of work, we have a kind of homecoming in which previously orphaned images are given a second life."

The exhibition was subsequently shown at the South African National Gallery in Cape Town in 2011. Ever Young: James Barnor also toured to Impressions Gallery, Bradford, exhibited from 5 July to 31 August 2013.

In August 2012, the show Another London: International Photographers Capture London Life 1930–1980 at Tate Britain included work by Barnor, with his 1967 photograph of BBC World Service reporter Mike Eghan (1936–2025) – titled "Mike Eghan at Piccadilly Circus, London" – featuring on the cover of the catalogue. A copy of the photograph is held in the UK government art collection at 10 Downing Street.

Barnor is featured in the exhibition Staying Power: Photographs of Black British Experience 1950s–1990s that opened in 2015, the culmination of a seven-year collaborative project between the Victoria and Albert Museum (V&A) and the Black Cultural Archives in Brixton, supported by the Heritage Lottery Fund, showcasing a number of black British photographers and images of black Britain from the 1950s to the 1990s.

His work was also represented in the Photographers' Gallery exhibition Work, Rest and Play: British Photography from the 1960s to Today (9 May – 12 July 2015), and was included alongside that of such iconic photographers as Terence Donovan, Brian Duffy, John French, Norman Parkinson, John Hopkins, John Cowan, Eric Swayne and Philip Townsend in the exhibition Swinging Sixties London – Photography in the Capital of Cool, which opened in June 2015 at Foam Fotografiemuseum Amsterdam in the Netherlands.

In October 2015, Barnor's work was shown in Paris at the Galerie Clémentine de la Féronnière in an exhibition entitled Ever Young that created "a narrative of two societies in transition". Sarah Preston, who initiated the production of the book about Barnor that was launched alongside the exhibition, says: "When I discovered James Barnor's work for the first time—on Baudoin Lebon's stand at Paris Photo 2011—it felt like a breath of fresh air. Saturated by French collections of West African studio photography, seeing outdoor images of every day life in Ghana in black and white, through the eyes of a Ghanaian rather than a white photographer, was a revelation. Discovering Barnor's colour work from the 70s was the icing on the cake. Why had I never seen this before? Why had it not been exhibited? The question of the importance of showing archival material comes to mind. But also one wonders: how much stuff are we missing?"

In September 2016, the October Gallery hosted an exhibition of Barnor's work alongside that of Daniele Tamagni (b. 1975), an Italian photographer who trained as an art historian before travelling worldwide to document style and fashion subcultures, which pairing was described as giving "a sumptuous view of the continuing legacy of African style".

Barnor's 91st birthday on 6 June 2020 was celebrated with #StillEverYoung, an online exhibition of his work. A major retrospective of his work at London's Serpentine Gallery was announced for 2021, having been postponed from June 2020. The exhibition James Barnor: Accra/London – A Retrospective took place from 30 March to 24 October 2021. Discussing his Serpentine exhibition with critic Will Fenstermaker in T Magazine, Barnor noted that his brother had tossed out nearly a decade's worth of the artist's work: "If that bulk of work were available, it would show another part of me altogether."

In 2023, the Detroit Institute of Arts mounted James Barnor: Accra/London – A Retrospective – an expanded form of the retrospective held at Serpentine Galleries – on show between May 28 and October 15.

Barnor's work was included in the 2025 exhibition Photography and the Black Arts Movement, 1955–1985 at the National Gallery of Art.

== Recognition ==
It has been said of him: "Photographer James Barnor is to decolonizing Ghana (and later to 1960s black Britain) what Oumar Ly is to Senegal or Malick Sidibe and Seydou Keita were to Mali." In February 2022, Barnor was named in CasildART's list of the top six Black British photographers, alongside Charlie Phillips, Armet Francis, Neil Kenlock, Pogus Caesar and Vanley Burke.

=== Solo exhibitions ===
- 2007: Mr Barnor's Independence Diaries, Black Cultural Archives, London, UK
- 2010: James Barnor: Ever Young, Rivington Place, London, UK
- 2010: James Barnor: Ever Young, Street and Studio Photography, Ghana/UK, Hutchins Center for African & African American Research, Harvard University, Boston, US (28 January–26 May)
- 2011: James Barnor: Ever Young, South African National Gallery, Cape Town, South Africa
- 2013: James Barnor: Ever Young, Impressions Gallery, Bradford, UK (5 July–31 August)
- 2015: Ever Young, Galerie Clémentine de la Féronnière, Paris, France
- 2016: Ever Young — James Barnor, Black Artists' Network in Dialogue (BAND) in partnership with Autograph, BAND Gallery, Toronto, Canada (28 April–29 May)
- 2016: James Barnor: Ever Young, Rebuild Foundation, Stony Island Arts Bank, Chicago, US (23 June–3 September)
- 2017–2018: La vie selon James Barnor, 11e biennale des Rencontres de Bamako, Bamako, Mali
- 2017–2018: Ever Young, Musée du Quai Branly, vitrine jardin, Paris
- 2018: La vie selon James Barnor, Mupho Musée de la Photographie de Saint-Louis, Saint Louis, Sénégal
- 2018: La vie selon James Barnor, Gallery 1957, Kempinski Hotel, Accra, Ghana
- 2019: Colors, Galerie Clémentine de la Férronnière, Paris
- 2019: La vie selon James Barnor, Gerard Sekoto Gallery, Johannesburg
- 2019–2020: James Barnor: A Retrospective, Nubuke Foundation, Accra, Ghana
- 2021: James Barnor: Accra/London – A Retrospective, Serpentine Galleries.
- 2022: James Barnor: Stories. Pictures from the Archive (1947–1987), LUMA Arles
- 2023: James Barnor: Accra/London – A Retrospective, Detroit Institute of Arts

=== Group exhibitions ===
- 2004: Acton Arts Festival
- 2012: Another London: International Photographers Capture London Life 1930–1980, at Tate Britain, London, UK (27 July–18 September)
- 2015: Swinging Sixties London - Photography in the Capital of Cool, Foam Fotografiemuseum Amsterdam, Amsterdam, the Netherlands (11 June–2 September)
- 2015: Staying Power: Photographs of Black British Experience 1950s-1990s, BCA (15 January–30 June) and V & A (16 February–24 May), London, UK
- 2015: Work, Rest and Play: British Photography from the 1960s to Today, Photographers' Gallery, London, UK (9 May–12 July)
- 2016: Daniele Tamagni and James Barnor, October Gallery, London, UK (8–30 September)
- 2017–2018: It's great to be young, photographies de James Barnor et Marc Riboud, Galerie Clémentine de la Féronnière, Paris
- 2024–2025: The 80s: Photographing Britain, Tate Britain, London, UK (21 November 2024 – 5 May 2025)

== Publications ==
- James Barnor: Ever Young. Clémentine de la Féronnière / Autograph ABP, 2015. ISBN 9782954226644. Includes an extensive interview with Barnor in conversation with Margaret Busby and Francis Hodgson. Published to accompany an exhibition in Paris.

== Collections ==
Barnor's work is held in the following permanent collections:

- Victoria and Albert Museum, London
- Tate, UK
- Government Art Collection, UK

== Awards ==
- 2011: GUBA (Ghana UK-Based Achievement) special "Lifetime Achievement" award. The first award he had ever been given.
- 2016: Order of the Volta, in recognition of his outstanding contribution to the development of Ghana, conferred by President John Dramani Mahama at the National Honours and Awards Ceremony held at Accra International Conference Centre.
- 2020: Honorary Fellowship of the Royal Photographic Society
