= Peckham Platform =

Art gallery in London

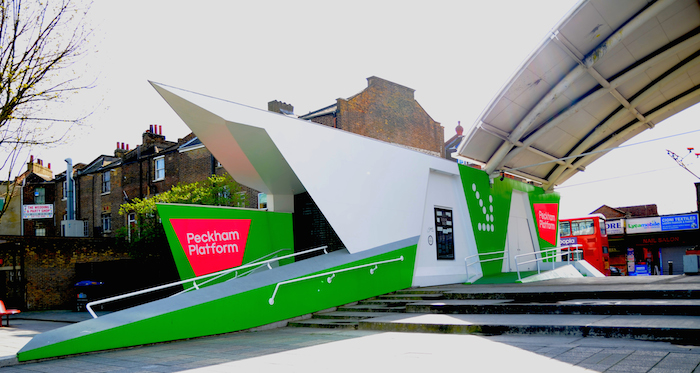

- Location within London
- Established: 2009
- Director: Emily Druiff
- Public transit access: Peckham Rye
- Website: www.peckhamplatform.com

Peckham Platform (formerly called Peckham Space) is a social art organisation in London that commissions and exhibits new work by contemporary artists, in collaboration with local community groups.

== History ==
Peckham Platform was founded in 2009 as an initiative developed by nearby Camberwell College of Arts to commission location-specific projects by contemporary artists in collaboration with local youth groups. The first brand new, purpose-built, public-funded art gallery in south London since 1891, the 'Peckham Space' building was designed by the architects Penson Group and was located on Peckham Square in the Peckham district of South London. Funders for the new venture originally called included Arts Council England and Southwark Council, as well as UAL. In 2013, the gallery became independent from Camberwell College of Arts, changing its name and, through the formation of a board of trustees, established itself as a charitable social art organisation rather than a gallery. Peckham Platform's founding director was Emily Druiff, whose earlier career as a curator and artist was focussed on the field of socially engaged art in London.

The original 'Peckham Space' building closed in 2016. Plans for a new building on Peckham Square are in development with Southwark Council, designed by architects Knox Bhavan.

== Exhibitions ==
Since its founding in 2009, Peckham Platform has established a programme of commissioning new work for solo exhibitions by British and international artists. These have included Myah Asha Jeffers ('In Living Memory', in 2026), Harold Offeh ('Futurama', in 2010; 'Peckham Platform Retrospective', in 2016), installation artist Gayle Chong Kwan ('Double Vision', in 2012), filmmakers Sonia Boyce ('Network' in 2011) and Nikolaj Bendix Skyum Larsen (343 Perspectives in 2012), painter Kimathi Donkor (Daddy, I want to be a black artist, in 2013), performance artist Jessica Voorsanger (Peckham Heroes, in 2011) and Ruth Beale, whose 2014 show 'Bookbed' helped relaunch the gallery under its new name. All of the organisation's exhibitions have involved artistic collaborations with local community groups and residents, particularly young people – in line with the institution's mission to build creative links between contemporary art and the community.

== Education and Youth ==
Public art education is part of Peckham Platform's exhibition programme. It includes educational workshops, artist's talks and seminars.

== Governance ==
Peckham Platform has charitable status under UK law and is governed by a board of trustees.
