= Mike Eghan =

Ghanaian broadcaster (1939–2025)

- Born: Henry Michael Eghan; 14 March 1936; Sekondi-Takoradi, Gold Coast (present-day Ghana)
- Died: 5 June 2025 (aged 89)
- Other name: The Magnificent Emperor
- Occupation: Broadcaster
- Known for: The Mike Eghan Show; MC of Soul to Soul (1971)
- Notable work: The "Emperor's" Story – From the Centre of the World (2019)

Mike Eghan (14 March 1936 – 5 June 2025) was a Ghanaian broadcaster, also known as "The Magnificent Emperor". In a career as a disc jockey and radio presenter spanning six decades, Eghan hosted programmes for the Ghana Broadcasting Corporation (GBC) and for the BBC World Service in London. He was the master of ceremonies for the historic concert in Ghana Soul to Soul, which took place in Black Star Square in 1971 and showcased many prominent African-American artists alongside Ghanaian musicians.

Eghan's autobiography, The "Emperor's" Story – From the Centre of the World, was published in 2019. In the words of Anis Haffar: "The man's kaleidoscopic knowledge of show business, broadcasting, entertainment and politics is cast in the trenches of personal encounters. He shares history from the strategic standpoint of his own roles in the making of it."

== Biography ==
Born on 14 March 1936 in Sekondi-Takoradi, Gold Coast (present-day Ghana), the fifth of nine siblings, Eghan was inspired by his civil servant father Ben Eghan's passion for radio to join the Ghana Broadcasting Corporation (GBC) in 1961, after giving up a job with Barclays Bank that had been secured for him.

In 1965, he went to Britain, where he worked with the BBC Africa Service, hosting the programme Music with African Beat for four years. Photographs of Eghan taken during this time feature among the iconic work of veteran Ghanaian photographer James Barnor. Leaving the BBC, Eghan returned home to work with GBC, wanting to contribute to the development of Ghana and raise his children there.

He said: "One of the highlights of my career as a disc jockey and radio presenter was my role as emcee (master of ceremony) for the historic musical concert dubbed 'Soul to Soul'. The aim of this musical extravaganza was to bring Africans and African-American artistes together to jam on the African continent to retrace their historical roots. It was believed that such an attempt would galvanise Black people all over the world along with the vision that Osagyefo Dr Kwame Nkrumah had for the Black Race." High-profile soul, gospel and dance groups participated in Soul to Soul, which took place in Black Star Square (now Independence Square), including Wilson Pickett, Ike and Tina Turner, Les McCann, Eddie Harris, The Staple Singers, Carlos Santana, Roberta Flack, Willie Bobo, the Voices of East Harlem, and others.

Eghan's popular 1970s talk show, The Mike Eghan Show, featured guests including Miriam Makeba, Ephraim Amu and Captain J. H. Tachie-Menson. Eghan subsequently took employment as a Treatment Manager with the Volta River Authority, then had another stint of work in the UK with the BBC. Back in Ghana, he resumed work with GBC, and later ran the Sundown Hotel.

He launched his memoir, The "Emperor's" Story – From the Centre of the World, at the age of 83 in Accra in August 2019 at the University of Ghana's Institute of African Studies, the occasion presided over by Professor Esi Sutherland-Addy.

Eghan died on 5 June 2025, at the age of 89. A tribute by Cameron Duodu described Eghan as "bonhomie personified" with an "unerring professional eye".

== Awards and recognition ==
James Barnor's iconic photograph "Mike Eghan at Piccadilly Circus, London" featured on the cover of the catalogue for the 2012 Tate Britain exhibition Another London: International Photographers Capture London Life 1930–1980; a copy of the photograph is also held in the UK government art collection at 10 Downing Street. Eghan and Barnor meeting was reimagined in a play entitled DRUM, by Jacob Roberts-Mensah, which was staged at The Omnibus Theatre in Clapham, south London, in September 2022.

A documentary film in honour of Eghan, produced by Andrew Gyawu-Mensah, was screened in March 2017.

Eghan's awards included the Grand Medal in acknowledgement of his meritorious service in the media.
