= Handsworth Riots – Twenty Summers On =

Handsworth Riots – Twenty Summers On is the name of an exhibition of photographs taken by Birmingham film maker and photographer Pogus Caesar during and in the wake of the Handsworth Riots, 9–11 September 1985.

In September 1985 the weather was warm, thousands of dancing revellers, many in colorful costumes were pouring into the streets of Handsworth, an area of Birmingham, Great Britain well known for its vast cultural mix. Most people who attend the annual Handsworth Carnival on the Saturday and Sunday say it has been a success.

At approximately 5 pm on Monday, 9 September, an African Caribbean man was arrested near the Acapulco Cafe, Lozells Road for a traffic offence.

Soon a crowd consisting of African Caribbean, Asian and British people asked the police to let the man go; the police refused the request and the situation escalated into a riot. By 7.30 pm, the Villa Cross Bingo Hall and Social Club was on fire; firemen tried to control the flames but the crowd said "let it burn".

Between 8 pm and midnight, cars were set alight, shops were looted and residents were forced to leave their homes. At 11.30 pm, police took back control of the Lozells Road area after hours of looting and burning.

What is now known as the Handsworth Riots lasted for two days. In the aftermath, well over 1500 police officers were drafted into the area and 50 shops were either burnt or looted. Damage to property was estimated at hundreds of thousands of pounds. 35 people were either injured or hospitalised, two people were unaccounted for, and two people lost their lives.

2005 was the 20th anniversary of the events that exploded onto the streets of Lozells and Handsworth. Even today people still ask the question "how could a tiny spark turn into such a gigantic flame"?

An online exhibition from the Pogus Caesar / OOM Gallery Archives as part of British Black History Month 2005
