= Stuart Hall Library =

Special collections library in London, United Kingdom

Coordinates: 51.4902°N 0.1290°W

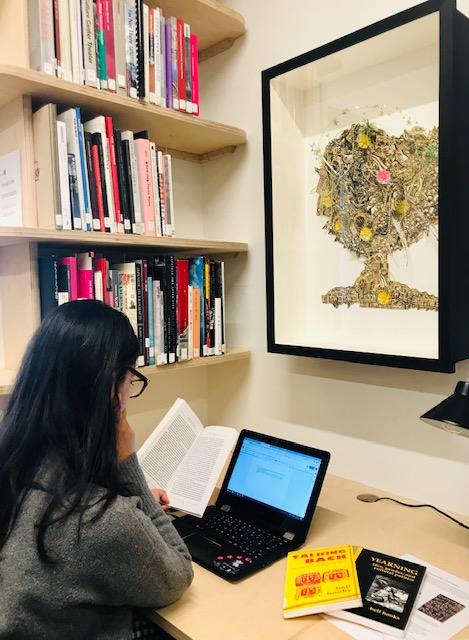
Stuart Hall Library study space

The Stuart Hall Library is the special collections library and archive of Iniva (Institute of International Visual Art), in Pimlico, London, independent of, but located on the campus of Chelsea College of Arts. It is named after the Jamaican-British cultural theorist Stuart Hall (1932–2014).

== Library resources ==
The library has a collection of over 10,000 holdings including a multi-media collection comprising books, monographs, periodicals, slides, DVDs, CDs, film and video, photographs and sound recordings. Pride of place goes to over 4,000 exhibition catalogues from around the world.

The focus of the collection is on British, European and American contemporary art by artists predominantly with an African, Afro-Caribbean, African-American, South Asian, East Asian, Oceanic and Latin American heritage. The collection also has a specialist focus on contemporary art produced in Africa, Asia, Latin America and Oceania.

== Access ==
The library is reference only: books and other resources can be read, but not borrowed. However, the catalogue of the library's holdings is available online, and registration and use of the library are free to the general public.

== History ==
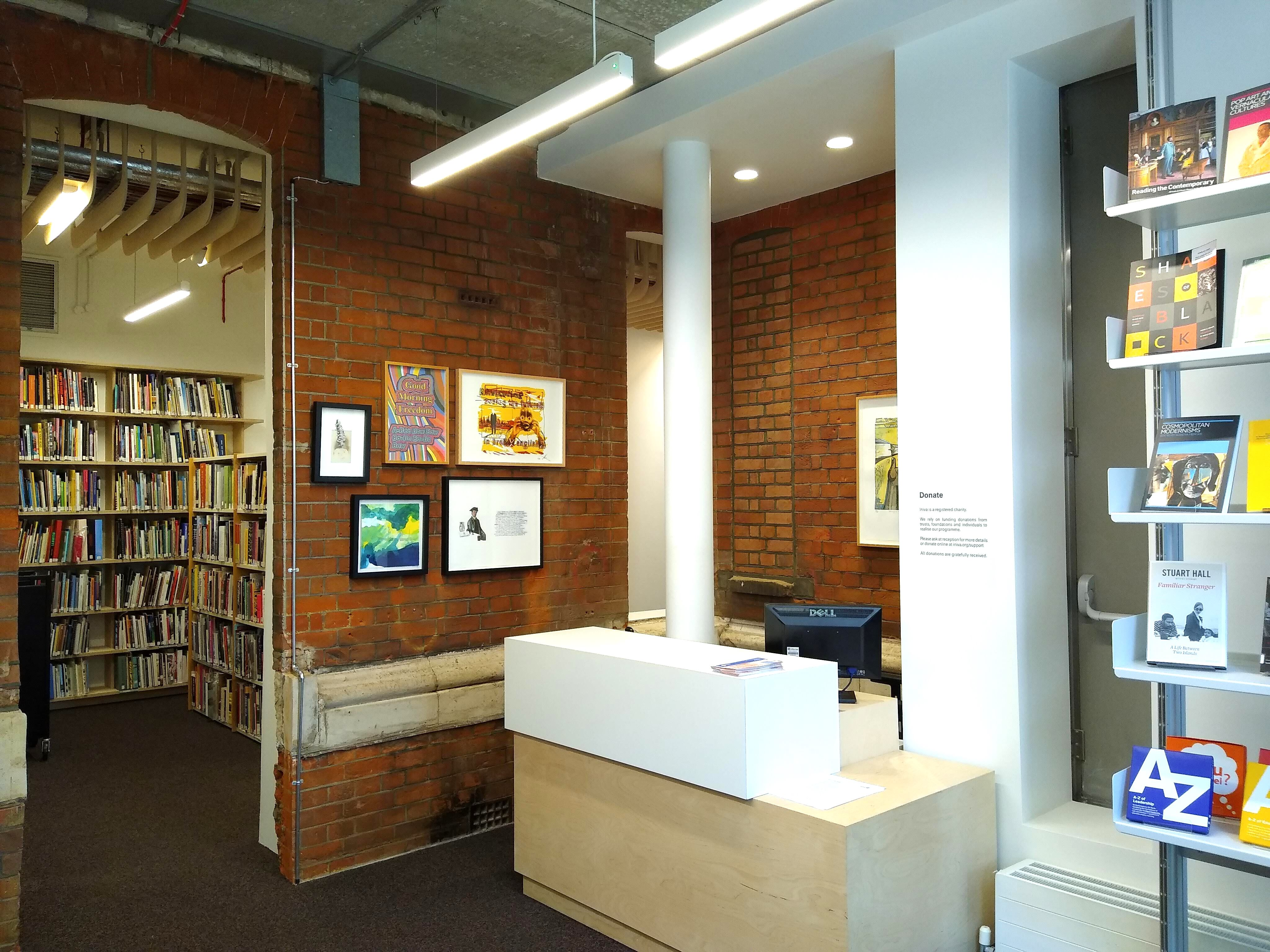
Stuart Hall Library

Having been established in 1994, Iniva's library at Rivington Place was renamed Stuart Hall Library in 2007. It is named in honour of the leading Cultural Studies theoretician, Jamaican-British writer Stuart Hall, who was the founding chair of Iniva.

In October 2018, library moved out of Rivington Place, to premises leased from the Chelsea College of Arts in Pimlico.
