= Documentary Photography Archive =

The Documentary Photography Archive (DPA) is a photo archive founded in 1985 and held at the Greater Manchester County Record Office by Manchester City Council. The archive captures aspects of the people and places of the Greater Manchester region in the UK and includes over 100,000 images from family albums and elsewhere, from the 1840s to the 1950s. It also commissioned contemporary photographers to document aspects of everyday life from the mid-1980s to the 1990s, which is also held in the archive.

== Details ==
The collection of images and related material includes:

- Over 80,000 photographs from schools, workplaces, studios and Manchester streets dating back to 1840.
- Donated photographs from photographic businesses and societies.
- Panora school negatives from 1968 to 1985.
- An oral history collection.
- Contemporary commissioned works from the mid-1980s to the 1990s, including:
  - Retailing in the Borough of Salford (1985) by Martin Parr.
  - Manchester International Airport : A Typical Day by Shirley Baker at Manchester Airport, July and August 1987. Includes 547 black and white 35 mm negatives, 38 colour 35 mm negatives, 72 black and white prints and 12 colour prints.
  - Care in the Community – Rainhill Hospital (1988–1990) by Tom Wood. Rainhill Hospital before its closure.
  - Cammell Laird Shipyard, Birkenhead (1996) by Tom Wood. Cammell Laird shipyard (1993–1996) in Liverpool before its closure.
  - Photographs by Clement Cooper.
  - Photographs by John Darwell.

Staff at the archive have included Caroline Warhurst and Audrey Linkman.
