= Neil Kenlock =

British photographer (born 1950)

Neil Kenlock MBE
- Born: Neil Emile Elias Kenlock; 1950 (age 75–76); Port Antonio, Jamaica
- Occupations: Photographer and media professional
- Known for: Co-founder of Choice FM official photographer of the British Black Panthers
- Website: kenlockphotography.com

Neil Emile Elias Kenlock MBE (born 1950) is a Jamaican-born photographer and media professional who has lived in London since the 1960s. During the 1960s and 1970s, Kenlock was the official photographer of the British Black Panthers, and he has been described as being "at the forefront of documenting the black experience in the UK". Kenlock was the co-founder of Choice FM, the first successful radio station granted a licence to cater for the black community in Britain.

== Background and career ==
Neil Kenlock was born in 1950 Port Antonio, Jamaica, where he was raised by his grandmother until 1963, when he migrated to London to join his parents who had settled in Brixton. As a youth in south London he captured in photographs the lives of the local community as well as becoming known for portraits taken on family occasions, his work as a whole coming to represent an exploration of many aspects of black British culture and history.

After working for photographic studios, in 1973 he became a staff photographer for West Indian World, one of the first national black British newspapers. In his first two decades as a professional photographer he specialised in fashion, beauty, celebrities and the cultural lifestyles of Black Britons. Also noted for his street photography, during the late 1960s and the 1970s Kenlock became involved with the British Black Panther movement, becoming the group's official photographer and documenting anti-racist protests and demonstrations in the UK.

In 1979, Kenlock co-founded the pioneering Black lifestyle magazine Root ("A British Ebony, only more connected to how people live in Britain"), published until 1987, and he subsequently became co-founder of Choice FM, which was the UK's first radio station broadcasting to the black community.

Key figures and leaders in the black community feature in his photographic archive, including Olive Morris, Altheia Jones-LeCointe, Courtney Laws, Audley Baines, Darcus Howe and Lionel Morrison. Among international superstars whom Kenlock has photographed over the years are Marvin Gaye, Stevie Wonder, Eartha Kitt, Donald Quarrie, Eddy Grant, James Baldwin and Muhammad Ali, icons of reggae music such as Bob Marley, Peter Tosh, Jimmy Cliff. Desmond Dekker and John Holt, and political personalities including Diane Abbott, Michael Manley and Indira Gandhi.

In August 2018, in celebration of the 70th anniversary of the arrival of the Empire Windrush bringing one of the first large groups of post-war West Indian immigrants to the United Kingdom, the Black Cultural Archives (BCA) showed 70 of Kenlock's photographs in the exhibition Expectations: The untold story of Black community leaders, curated by his daughter Emelia Kenlock, featuring such notable African and Caribbean subjects as Olive Morris, Darcus Howe, Arthur Wint, Lord David Pitt, Courtney Law and Steve Barnard. Funded by a grant from the Heritage Lottery Fund, the project "aims to give access to examples of black leadership, as well as archive material outside of the normal educational environment," as Kenlock stated in an interview: "Over 50 years since the concept of ‘black excellence' first manifested and 70 years on from the Windrush, I truly hope the exhibition will add to the national cultural narrative and resonate with new audiences."

Kenlock was appointed Member of the Order of the British Empire (MBE) in the 2022 New Year Honours for services to media.

In February 2022, Kenlock was named in CasildART's list of the top six Black British photographers, alongside Charlie Phillips, James Barnor, Armet Francis, Pogus Caesar and Vanley Burke.

== Exhibitions ==
=== Solo exhibitions ===
- The Amazing Lost Legacy of the British Black Panthers, Photofusion Gallery, Brixton, London, 2013
- Stan Firm Inna Inglan: Black Diaspora in London, 1960–1970, Tate Britain, London, 2017
- Expectations, Black Cultural Archives, Windrush Square, London, 2018
- Chatham House, London, for Black History Month, 2021

=== Group exhibitions ===
- Roots to Reckoning: the photography of Armet Francis, Neil Kenlock and Charlie Phillips, Museum of London, London, 2005
- Staying Power: Photographs of Black British Experience, Victoria and Albert Museum, London, 2015
- Life Between Islands: Caribbean-British Art 1950s–Now, Tate Britain, London, 2021/2022
