= Tessa Jackson =

British art curator

Jane Thérèse "Tessa" Jackson OBE is a British art curator, writer and cultural advisor .

The daughter of John Nevill Jackson and Viva Christian Thérèse (née Blomfield) Jackson, she was educated at the University of East Anglia, the University of Manchester and the University of Bristol, where she took her master's degree.

== Career ==
In 1991, Jackson was appointed as the director of the Arnolfini (Bristol's contemporary art venue), in which she played a leading role in the redevelopment of the institution.

In 1999, she was appointed director of the Scottish Arts Council, where she was responsible for the public funding of the arts in Scotland.

In 2002, she became the founding artistic director and chief executive of the Artes Mundi Prize, a contemporary art prize in Wales, a position which she held until 2010. Simultaneously, she was also the chair of the Edinburgh Art Festival between 2005 and 2010.

Appointed to the position of CEO of Iniva(the Institute of International Visual Arts) in 2009, she continued to uphold the organisation's remit to bring leading black, Asian, African, Middle-Eastern, Caribbean, Oceanic and Latin American contemporary artists from around the world to the London venue, which had become, in 2007, the capital's first purpose-built, publicly funded international contemporary art gallery since the Hayward Gallery in 1968.

Following her departure from Iniva in 2015, Jackson returned to being an independent curator and cultural advisor for the National Portrait Gallery, the National Trust, the National Trust for Scotland, Heong Gallery - Cambridge and the Mongolian Pavilion at the Venice Biennale (2016-17).

In 2022 Jackson researched and curated the inaugural exhibition for the refurbished RWA (Royal West of England Academy), Bristol entitled 'Me, Myself, I: Artists' Self-Portraits'.

== Awards ==
In 2011, Jackson was awarded an OBE (Order of the British Empire) in the Queen's New Year's Honours List, in recognition for her 25 years of service to art.

== Selected bibliography ==
- Francesco Bonami; Joel Snyder; Tessa Jackson (2004). Fiona Tan: Correction. Museum of Contemporary Art, Chicago. ISBN 9780933856844.
- Tessa Jackson, ed. (2004). Artes Mundi. Seren. ISBN 9781854113696.
- Tessa Jackson; Owen Sheers; Ann Jones (2011). Tim Davies. Riding House. ISBN 9781905464432.
- Tessa Jackson; Jane Lee (1993). Tracy Mackenna: Purposeful Invisibility. Arnolfini. ASIN B0041U7ULC.
- Sophie Bowness; David Chipperfield; Frances Guy; Jackie Heuman; Tessa Jackson; Simon Wallis; Gordon Watson (2011). Barbara Hepworth: The Plasters The Gift to Wakefield. Lund Humphries. ISBN 9781848220669.
