= Soul to Soul (film) =

1971 documentary film by Denis Sanders

- Directed by: Denis Sanders
- Produced by: Richard Bock, Tom Mosk
- Cinematography: David Myers
- Production company: Nigram-Aura Productions
- Distributed by: Cinerama Releasing Corporation
- Release date: 1971
- Running time: 96 min.
- Language: English

Soul to Soul is a 1971 documentary film about the Independence Day concert held in Accra, Ghana, on 6 March 1971. It features an array of mostly American R&B, soul, rock, and jazz musicians.

Directed by Denis Sanders, Soul to Soul was released in August 1971. The film consists of extensive excerpts from the concert performances, along with documentary footage of the musicians' interactions with local Ghanaians in the days before the show.

== Concert ==
Ghana, after declaring its Independence on 6 March 1957, had made a variety of efforts to connect with African diasporans, some of whom—including Maya Angelou, W. E. B. Du Bois and George Padmore—lived in the West African nation for a time. In the mid-1960s, Angelou approached the government of Kwame Nkrumah and suggested bringing a number of African-American artists to Ghana for the annual independence celebrations. Nkrumah was deposed as president before action could be taken, but when the American father-son team of Ed Mosk and Tom Mosk approached the Ghana Arts Council in 1970 with the idea for a concert, the Council agreed.

Of the musicians invited to perform, Wilson Pickett was by far the biggest star in Ghana. The organizers also unsuccessfully sought performances by Americans Aretha Franklin, James Brown, Booker T & The MG's, Louis Armstrong, and gospel singer Marion Williams.

The show, with Ghanaian broadcaster Mike Eghan as MC, was held in Black Star Square (now Independence Square).

Several at the show remarked that the band Santana, despite having only one black member, played the most "African-sounding" music of the night. Some have argued that Santana's merger of Latin rhythms with rock music strongly influenced the development of Afrobeat.

== Musicians ==
The American artists were mostly African-American and represented a variety of musical styles:

- Wilson Pickett
- Ike & Tina Turner
- Les McCann and Eddie Harris
- The Staple Singers
- Santana, featuring Willie Bobo on timbale
- Roberta Flack
- The Voices of East Harlem

The concert also featured performances by several Ghanaian acts:

- Guy Warren, a.k.a. "The Divine Drummer," also known as Kofi Ghanaba, one of the first African musicians to play alongside American jazz musicians
- The Damas Choir, perhaps the nation's most prominent vocal group since the 1940s, led by Ishmael Adams
- Charlotte Dada (sometimes spelled Dadah or Daddah), best known in the West for her soul cover of The Beatles' song "Don't Let Me Down"
- Kwa Mensah, a pioneer in highlife music and the older palmwine style
- The Kumasi Drummers, a group from the Ashanti Region
- The Aliens, Ghana's best known rock band, sometimes known as The Psychedelic Aliens or The Magic Aliens
- The Anansekromian Zounds, the house band for the Ghana Arts Council

Also performing (and seen on the film) were the Nandom Sekpere group from the Northern (now Upper West) region, and the whistle player Nakpi.

In addition, Les McCann and Eddie Harris played part of their set with a Ghanaian calabash player and medicine man named Amoah Azangeo.

== Reception ==
The New York Times (19 August 1971):

"Soul to Soul" will hook you. We defy anybody to watch the final half hour of this color documentary of a soul and gospel music concert, performed in Ghana, without tapping a foot. But it is the sea of rapturous black faces, those of the visiting American artists and their Ghana audiences, that makes this movie a haunting experience … Mainly and compactly, the film sticks to the concert, brilliantly evoking the performances and crowd reactions in a flow of closeups and panoramic shots, to the stabbing, pounding pulse of the music.

== Home video ==
The film was eventually restored thanks to a program by the Grammy Foundation that seeks to preserve important films about music, and it debuted again in February 2004 at an event at the Los Angeles County Museum of Art. It was released on DVD on 24 August 2004. The new release does not include any performances by Roberta Flack, who requested their removal. But it does include a soundtrack album on CD, which features tracks from all the U.S. performers with the exception of Santana and Flack, plus the Kumasi Drummers, the Damas Choir, and Kwa Mensah.

== See also ==
- Curtis Mayfield
- Funk
- Osibisa
- Soul Power
- Super Fly T.N.T.
- Wattstax (1972)
