= What Do Artists Do All Day? =

BBC Four documentary series

What Do Artists Do All Day? is a documentary series, airing on BBC Four. Film crews accompany various prominent artists as they go about their daily schedules and share insights into their working lives and creative processes.

== Episodes ==
Series 1

- 2013-03-19 – Series 1 – 1. Norman Ackroyd, the working life of Britain's celebrated landscape artist.
- 2013-03-25 – Series 1 – 2. Polly Morgan, the taxidermist's strange and wonderful art
- 2013-04-08 – Series 1 – 3. Jack Vettriano, the popular artist at work in his studio.
- 2013-06-04 – Series 1 – 4. Cornelia Parker, prepares for a new exhibition of her work in London.
- 2013-08-22 – Series 1 – 5. John Byrne, artist and writer, completes a mural for King's Theatre in Edinburgh.
- 2013-11-06 – Series 1 – 6. Edmund de Waal, ceramic artist, author of the memoir The Hare with Amber Eyes
- 2013-11-13 – Series 1 – 7. Shani Rhys James, Welsh painter as she prepares for a new exhibition.
- 2014-02-25 – Series 1 – 8. Tom Wood, photographer at work in Mayo in the west of Ireland.
- 2014-03-04 – Series 1 – 9. Frank Quitely, alter ego of Glaswegian comic-book artist, Vince Deighan.
- 2014-03-13 – Series 1 – 10. Marvin Gaye Chetwynd, the performance artist's first solo UK show in Nottingham.
- 2014-03-11 – Series 1 – 11. Albert Watson photographs the landscape of the Isle of Skye.
- 2014-03-26 – Series 1 – 12. Antony Gormley and his team as they prepare a new work.
- 2014-05-19 – Series 1 – 13. Michael Craig-Martin at work in his London studio.

Series 2

- 2014-10-12 – Series 2 – 1. Evelyn Glennie, how the Dame became a global percussion superstar.
- 2014-10-15 – Series 2 – 2. Akram Khan, the creation of TOROBAKA, the dance collaboration with Israel Galvan.
- 2014-10-22 – Series 2 – 4. Michael Landy as he takes his Art Bin project to Yokohama.
- 2014-11-05 – Series 2 – 5. Jake and Dinos Chapman as they prepare for a new show in Hastings.

Series 3

- 2015-06-08 – Series 3 – 1. Tracey Emin, in her studio, preparing for an exhibition in Vienna.
- 2015-06-15 – Series 3 – 2. Sue Webster, at work on new projects, including a cook book.
- 2015-08-24 – Series 3 – 3. Derek Boshier works on a new painting and reflects on his life.
- 2015-08-26 – Series 3 – 4. Peter Blake, following the process of his latest work.

Series 4

- Dennis Morris
- Katie Paterson
- Shirley Hughes

Series 5

- Anoushka Shankar
- Raqib Shaw
- Mahtab Hussain
