= Armet Francis =

Jamaican-born photographer and publisher (born 1945)

- Born: 29 January 1945 (age 81); St Elizabeth, Jamaica
- Occupation: Photographer
- Years active: 1969–present
- Known for: Co-founder of Autograph ABP
- Notable work: The Black Triangle; Roots to Reckoning
- Website: www.armetfrancis.co.uk

Armet Francis (born 29 January 1945) is a Jamaican-born photographer and publisher who has lived in London, England, since the 1950s. He has been documenting and chronicling the lives of people of the African diaspora for more than 40 years and his assignments have included work for The Times Magazine, The Sunday Times Supplement, BBC and Channel 4.

He has exhibited worldwide and his work is in collections including those of the Victoria & Albert Museum and the Museum of London. One of his best known photographs is 1964's "Self Portrait in Mirror".

== Biography ==
Armet Francis was born in Saint Elizabeth Parish, in rural Jamaica, in 1945. He was left in the care of his grandparents at the age of three when his parents moved to London, England, where Francis joined them seven years later in 1955. Interviewed for the British Library's Oral History of British Photography, Francis spoke of growing up as the only black child in a school in London Docklands. After leaving school at 14, he worked for an engineering firm in Bromley, before finding a job as an assistant in a West End photographic studio, and going on to forge a career as a freelance photographer for fashion magazines and advertising campaigns.

He has said: "In 1969 I embarked on a lifetime project.... I was living and working in the first world, materially that is, but becoming more aware of inequalities to the third world, to be more specific the Black World. As a Black photographer I started to realise I had no social documentary images in my work.... I went back [to Jamaica] in 1969.... I had been away 14 years, it would take another 14 years to make sense of this project." Following his participation at Festac '77 (the Second World Black and African Festival of Arts and Culture) in Lagos, Nigeria, he became devoted to photographing the people of the African diaspora.

He became the first Black photographer to have a solo exhibition at The Photographers' Gallery in London when The Black Triangle series was exhibited there in 1983. He published a book also entitled The Black Triangle the following year, and Children of the Black Triangle was produced four years later. He was a contributing photographer in the survey issue of Ten.8, vol. 2, no. 3, 1992, titled Critical Decade: Black British Photography in the 80s.

In 1988, Francis was a co-founder of the Association of Black Photographers (now Autograph ABP). He was the official photographer for Africa '05, a major celebration of African arts held throughout 2005 in the UK. Francis was one of three pioneering Jamaican-born photographers – the others being Charlie Phillips and Neil Kenlock – whose work was showcased in the 2005/2006 exhibition Roots to Reckoning at the Museum of London, which in 2009 with the assistance of Art Fund acquired the "Roots to Reckoning archive", comprising 90 photographs of London's black community from the 1960s to the 1980s.

The British Library conducted an interview (C459/214) with Francis in 2013 for its Oral History of British Photography collection.

Photographs by Francis featured prominently in Staying Power, the collaborative project mounted in 2015 by the Victoria and Albert Museum (V&A) and the Black Cultural Archives. "The arresting first image in the V&A museum is Jamaican photographer Armet Francis's Self-portrait in Mirror (1964), a curiously intimate and honest image showing Armet setting up his shot directly in front of a mirror," noted the reviewer for Culture Whisper, while Brennavan Sritharan commented in the British Journal of Photography: "Self-portraiture is something of a sub-theme, with Armet Francis' tender yet assertive self-portrait leading the exhibit."

In February 2022, Francis was named in CasildART's list of the top six Black British photographers, alongside Charlie Phillips, James Barnor, Neil Kenlock, Pogus Caesar and Vanley Burke.

In 2023, Autograph ABP mounted the exhibition Armet Frances: Beyond the Black Triangle (on show from 22 September 2023 to 20 January 2024), curated by Mark Sealy. Bringing together four decades of work by Francis, it was described in a review by Aesthetica magazine as "an incisive and impressive display that emphasises: Francis is one of the greats."

In 2026, Francis's entire archive of more than 70,000 images was donated to the permanent collection of Autograph ABP.

== Exhibitions ==
=== Solo exhibitions ===
- The Black Triangle: People of the African Diaspora, The Photographers' Gallery, London, 1983
- Armet Frances: Beyond the Black Triangle, Autograph ABP, London (22 September 2023 – 20 January 2024)

=== Group exhibitions ===
- Reflections of the Black Experience: 10 Black Photographers, Brixton Art Gallery, London, 1986
- Transforming the Crown: African, Asian & Caribbean artists in Britain, 1966–1996, Caribbean Cultural Center, Studio Museum in Harlem, 1997; Bronx Museum of the Arts, New York, 1997
- Roots to Reckoning: the photography of Armet Francis, Neil Kenlock and Charlie Phillips, Museum of London, London, 2005/6
- Staying Power: Photographs of Black British Experience, 1950s – 1990s, Black Cultural Archives, London, 2015; Victoria & Albert Museum, London, 2015
- Get Up, Stand Up Now: Generations of Black Creative Pioneers, Somerset House, London, 2019
- Life Between Islands: Caribbean-British Art 1950s–Now, Tate Britain, 2021/2022

== Bibliography ==
=== Books ===
- The Black Triangle: The People of the African Diaspora. Seed, 1985. ISBN 978-0951059814
- Children of the Black Triangle. Africa World, 1989. ISBN 978-0865431300

=== Children's books ===
- Counting in Rhymes. Seed, 1990. ISBN 9780951059845. Coordinated and edited by Francis and Olga Graham.
- Carnival Time. Seed, 1990. ISBN 9780951059852

=== Publications with contributions by Francis ===
- Roots to Reckoning – photos by Armet Francis, Neil Kenlock, Charlie Phillips. Seed, 2005. Exhibition catalogue with introduction by Mike Phillips. ISBN 0-95105-988-2

== Collections ==
Works by Francis are held in the following public collections:

- Victoria and Albert Museum, London: 25 prints (as of October 2018)
- Museum of London, London
