= Paul Goodwin (curator) =

British curator, academic and researcher

- Education: Wadham College, University of Oxford
- Occupations: Curator, urban theorist, academic and researcher

Paul Goodwin is a British independent curator, urban theorist, academic and researcher, whose projects particularly focus on black and diaspora artists and visual cultures. He is Director at the Research Centre for Transnational Art, Identity and Nation (TrAIN), University of the Arts London.

== Background ==
Goodwin was curator at Tate Britain, from 2008 to 2012, where he directed the Cross Cultural Programme, using exhibitions, international conferences, workshops, talks and live art events to explore migration and globalisation in contemporary British art. He was Consultant Curator for the international exhibition Afro Modern: Journeys Through the Black Atlantic that took place at Tate Liverpool between January and April 2010, and programmed the accompanying Global Exhibitions symposium, co-editing a book based on papers from the symposium entitled Contemporary Art and the African Diaspora (Liverpool University Press). He worked with artists from the Black British art movement of the 1980s, notably Sonia Boyce, Chila Kumari Burman and Lubaina Himid, and among his concerns has been the issue that only a small percentage of the Tate's collection of British art is on display at any one time, reflecting the personal taste of curators or trends of the time; as he has said: "One of the factions of Britain which hasn't been very well represented until recently is the work of Black and Asian artists and that's one of the things that I really try to address in my work.”

From 2013 to 2016 Goodwin was Joint Chair with Sonia Boyce of Black Art and Design at the University of the Arts London (UAL), being appointed professor in 2014, and he went on to be Chair of Contemporary Art and Urbanism and Director of TrAIN, UAL's Research Centre for Transnational Art, Identity and Nation.

Goodwin has also taught and held research positions in the fields of visual culture, urbanism and critical theory at the University of Oxford, the University of Greenwich, Goldsmiths, University of London, University of Paris, Diderot – Paris 7, Connecticut State University and Stanford University Centre in Oxford.

Notable exhibitions that Goodwin has curated and co-curated include Migrations: Journeys Into British Art (Tate Britain, 2012), Thin Black Line(s) (Tate Britain, 2011), Go Tell It On The Mountain: Towards A New Monumentalism (2011) and Ways of Seeing (2012) at 3-D Foundation Sculpture Park in Verbier, Switzerland, Coming Ashore (2011, Berardo Collection Museum in Lisbon, Portugal), Underconstruction (Hospital Julius De Matos, Lisbon, Portugal, 2009), Transfigurations: Curatorial and Artistic Research in an Age of Migrations (MACBA Barcelona, 2014), Ghosts (Hangar, Lisbon, 2016), Chloe Dewe Mathews: In Search of Frankenstein, 2016 (and British Library, London, 2018), Verbier 3D Foundation Sculpture Park, Switzerland, Untitled: Art on the Conditions of Our Time, New Art Exchange, Nottingham, UK, 2017. More recently, Goodwin co-curated with Katie McCurrach the exhibition W.E.B. Du Bois: Charting Black Lives, featuring the pioneering infographics of African-American sociologist, historian, and civil rights activist W. E. B. Du Bois, at the House of Illustration in 2019–2020, and We Will Walk – Art and Resistance in the American South (7 February 2020 – 6 September 2020, Turner Contemporary).

Speaking about the exhibition Untitled: Art on the Conditions of Our Time, touring in 2021 at Kettle's Yard, Cambridge, Goodwin said: "This exhibition takes a bold curatorial approach to the often paradoxical question of curating 'black survey shows'. Instead of focusing on blackness ahead of the works themselves, Untitled flips this order and focuses on the works first and foremost. Questions of blackness, race and identity are then shown to be entangled in the multitude of concerns – aesthetic, material and political – that viewers can encounter without the curatorial voice obscuring the works." The mixed-medium exhibition, which features the work of 10 artists, including Kimathi Donkor, Greta Mendez, Phoebe Boswell, Larry Achiampong and David Blandy, was described in a review in The Independent as "a call to arms to understand, think, and dive deep into the worlds of these artists and their inner experiences. Only then, will we escape the idea of black art as a fad."

Goodwin has led workshops and programmes on curation, including in 2021 the series "Doing the Work" and " Genealogies of Black Curating in Britain".

Goodwin is an Honorary Fellow of Wadham College, University of Oxford.

== Selected writings ==
- "New Diasporic Voices", in Migrations: Journeys into British Art, 2012
- Transfigurations: Curatorial and Artistic Research in an Age of Migrations (with V. Walsh and P. Sepulveda), 2014
- "On Critical Curation - the role and the strategies of the curator in the age of globalization", in Arts and Globalisation: Achieving Intercultural Dialogue Through the Arts, 26–28 May 2015, Øksnehallen, Copenhagen.
- "Confessions of a Recalcitrant Curator: Or How to Re-Programme the Global Museum", in Malcolm Quinn, Dave Beech, Michael Lehnert, Carol Tulloch, Stephen Wilson (eds), The Persistence of Taste: Art, Museums and Everyday Life After Bourdieu (Routledge, 2018)
- "Beyond the Glitter: Hew Locke's Give and Take", in EN MAS': Carnival and Performance Art of the Caribbean (2016)
