= Subway Gallery =

Temporary gallery in Edgware Road

Coordinates: 51°31′12″N 0°10′8″W

- Established: 6 June 2006
- Location: Edgware Road tube station
- Type: Art gallery
- Founder: Robert Gordon McHarg III
- Website: subwaygallery.com

The Subway Gallery was a contemporary art gallery in the West End of London, England. It is now permanently closed.

The gallery was established on 6 June 2006 by the artist Robert Gordon McHarg III in a 1960s kiosk with glass walls. It was located in Edgware Road tube station on Edgware Road in Bayswater, in a tube station subway.

In March 2011, the London-based graffiti artist Stik had a solo show at the gallery. The American photographer Bob Gruen also exhibited there.
