= Shirley Baker =

British photographer (1932–2014)

Shirley Baker (9 July 1932 – 21 September 2014) was a British photographer, best known for her street photography and street portraits in working class areas of Greater Manchester. She worked as a freelance writer and photographer on various magazines, books and newspapers, and as a lecturer on photography. Most of her photography was made for her personal interest but she undertook occasional commissions.

During her lifetime Baker's photographs were published in two books and exhibited at The Photographers' Gallery, The Lowry and Salford Museum and Art Gallery.

== Life and work ==
Born in Kersal, in north Salford, Lancashire, Baker was one of identical twins. They moved to Manchester when she was two, and her sister later boarded at Penrhos Girls' School in Colwyn Bay, North Wales, from where they were evacuated during the Second World War to Chatsworth House, in Derbyshire. Baker went on to study photography at Manchester College of Technology, and took other courses at Regent Street Polytechnic in London and the London College of Printing. Later in life she gained an MA in critical history and the theory of photography at the University of Derby in 1995.

Baker started working as an industrial photographer for fabric manufacturers Courtaulds before working as freelance, as a photographer for other businesses and as a writer and photographer on various magazines, books and newspapers, including The Guardian.

In 1960 she began work as a lecturer at the Salford College of Art. Whilst there, for the next fifteen years, she made candid, unposed, spontaneous photographs of people living in the area in Salford and Manchester during a time of massive slum clearance. She has said she was influenced by the work of Henri Cartier-Bresson, Robert Frank and Garry Winogrand. She also worked as a lecturer at Manchester Polytechnic. She also joined the Royal Photographic Society in 1960 remaining a member for several years.

Baker had two books of her photographs published during her lifetime. Street Photographs: Manchester and Salford (1989) contains her photographs of people in Salford and Manchester in the 1960s and early 1970s. In the late 1990s she was commissioned by The Lowry to revisit the same places. The Lowry held an exhibition of her work and published a book, Streets and Spaces: Urban Photography – Salford and Manchester – 1960s–2000 (2000), with her older photographs juxtaposed against her new photographs, showing people in different periods, in a radically altered urban landscape, yet involved in similar activities.

In the 1980s, when Baker's doctor husband's work took them to London for a time, she photographed punks in and around Camden Lock and Camden Market. She also photographed in Japan, New York and the French Riviera. In 1987 she undertook a project on the Royal Manchester Children's Hospital supported by Viewpoint Gallery, Salford. In July and August 1987 she completed a commission to photograph at Manchester Airport for the Documentary Photography Archive (DPA). Baker's work at the airport was featured in a Granada Television programme on the work of the DPA and broadcast as part of its "Celebration" series on 23 October 1987.

== Legacy ==
Shirley Baker: Life Through a Lens, a feature-length documentary, had its premiere on 18 May 2023, at the Centre for British Photography in London. It was then shown at Manchester Art Gallery on 23 May 2023. The film, written by John West and directed and edited by Jason Figgis, is narrated by the actor Samantha Beckinsale.

== Publications ==
- Street Photographs: Manchester and Salford. Newcastle upon Tyne: Bloodaxe, 1989. ISBN 978-1852240585. With essays by Stephen Constantine, "Street Scenes: Late Afternoon", and by Baker, "Street Photographs".
- Streets and Spaces: Urban Photography – Salford and Manchester – 1960s–2000. Salford: The Lowry, 2000. ISBN 978-1902970127. Edited by Michael Leitch and with an essay by Baker. Published to accompany an exhibition at The Lowry.
- Women and Children; and Loitering Men. London: The Photographers' Gallery, 2015. ISBN 9780957618848. Published to accompany the exhibition Women, Children and Loitering Men at The Photographers' Gallery, London, 17 July – 20 September 2015. Edited by Anna Douglas. With a preface by Brett Rogers, a foreword by Grislelda Pollock, an essay by Anna Douglas and a short story by Jackie Kay.
- Shirley Baker. London: Mack, 2019. Edited by Lou Stoppard. ISBN 978-1-912339-51-8.

=== Zines ===
- Punks 1980s. Southport: Café Royal, 2018; 2020.
- British Seaside 1960–1970. Southport: Café Royal, 2018; 2020.
- Manchester and Salford Children in the 1960s. Southport: Café Royal, 2018.
- Manchester and Salford on Holiday in the 1960s. Southport: Café Royal, 2018.

== Exhibitions ==
=== Solo exhibitions ===
- 1986: My Face or Yours, touring exhibition.
- 2000/2001: Salford Revisited, The Lowry, Salford, Greater Manchester, August 2000 – January 2001.
- 2006/2007: The Photographers' Gallery, London, February 2006 – December 2007.
- 2011/2012: Salford Museum and Art Gallery, Salford, Greater Manchester, November 2011 – March 2012. A retrospective.
- 2013: Looking Outwards, Gallery Oldham, Oldham.
- 2015: Women, Children and Loitering Men, The Photographers' Gallery, London, July–September 2015.

=== Exhibitions with others ===
- 1963: Nine Photographers, Manchester Building and Design Centre, Manchester, November–December 1963.
- 1986: Here Yesterday, and Gone Today exhibited at Salford Art Gallery as part of the Images of Salford exhibition.
- 1989: North West Frontiers, July–August 1989, Cornerhouse, Manchester.
- 2012: A Lowry Summer, The Lowry, Salford, Greater Manchester, July–October 2012. Exhibition of work by L. S. Lowry accompanied by work from other artists who depicted leisure time, Baker and Humphrey Spender.
- 2012: Observers: British Photography and the British Scene, Serviço Social da Indústria (SESI), São Paulo.
