= Iniva =

British visual art organisation

Coordinates: 51.4902°N 0.1290°W

- Named after: Institute of International Visual Arts
- Location: 16 John Islip St, London SW1P 4JU
- Director: Sepake Angiama
- Key people: Stuart Hall
- Website: www.iniva.org
- Formerly called: inIVA

Iniva (which was formerly written as inIVA) is the Institute of International Visual Art, a visual arts organisation based in London that collaborates with contemporary artists, curators and writers. Iniva runs the Stuart Hall Library, and is based in Pimlico, on the campus of Chelsea College of Arts.

== Exhibitions ==
Over the course of its existence, Iniva has hosted and/or produced major solo exhibitions by significant British and international artists, including sculptor Hew Locke ("Kingdom of the Blind", in 2008), filmmaker Zineb Sedira ("Currents of Time" in 2009), Donald Rodney ("In Retrospect", in 2008), Keith Piper ('Relocating the Remains' in 1997 and 'Unearthing the Banker's Bones' in 2016), Yinka Shonibare ('Diary of a Victorian Dandy' in 1998) and Guyanese painter Aubrey Williams in 1998.

The institute has also raised the profile of many artists to a wider UK public, including Israeli conceptual artist Roee Rosen, British painter Kimathi Donkor, British filmmaker Alia Syed, Indian conceptual group Raqs Media Collective and British contemporary artist Joy Gregory.

== History ==
Iniva was founded in 1994 with a remit to address an imbalance in the way culturally diverse artists and curators were being represented in the UK. Funded by Arts Council England and governed by a board of trustees, the institute has worked with artists, curators, creative producers, writers and the public to explore and reflect cultural diversity in the visual arts.

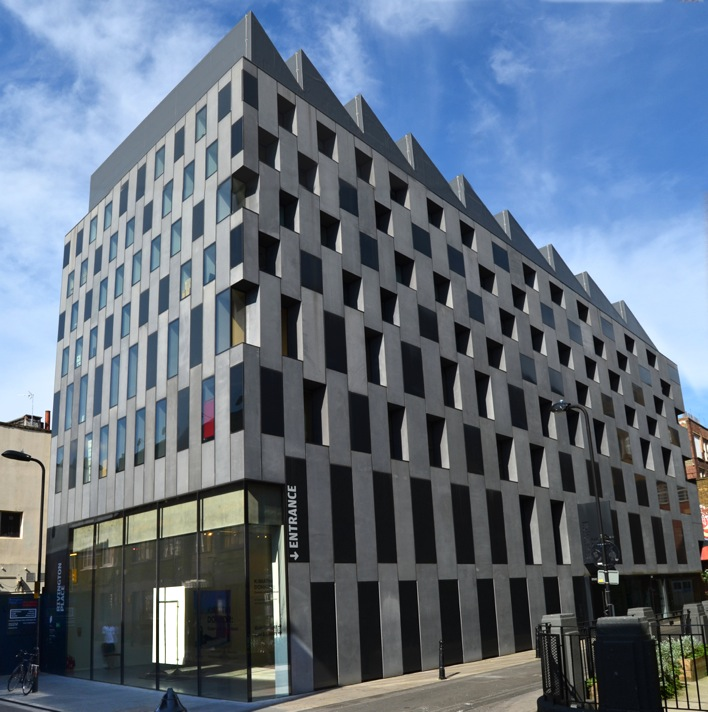
Rivington Place

Iniva and Autograph ABP partnered to build Rivington Place, a five-floor, 15,000-square-foot (1,400 m^{2}) visual arts centre in East London. The £5 million building was designed by architect David Adjaye and opened to the public on 5 October 2007. It was the first publicly funded, purpose-built international visual arts venue constructed in London since the Hayward Gallery opened more than 40 years earlier. Rivington Place housed two exhibition spaces and the Stuart Hall Library, established by Iniva, as well as art education and seminar rooms - plus the offices of Iniva and Autograph.

Until 2008, cultural theorist and sociologist Stuart Hall was chair of Iniva and Autograph ABP (the Association of Black Photographers, also based in Rivington Place).

Iniva's first director was Gilane Tawadros, followed in 2005 by international curator Sebastián López, then the curator and cultural historian Dr Gus Casely-Hayford, Tessa Jackson, former chief executive of the Scottish Arts Council, and, from 2015, Melanie Keen, who was a curator at Iniva from 1996 to 2003, and most recently a senior manager at Arts Council England.

Its funding has been greatly reduced in recent years. When the Arts Council announced its new National Portfolio Organisation structure for arts funding in 2012, Iniva's funding was cut by 43.3%, and by a further 62.3% in 2015.

In October 2018, Iniva and the Stuart Hall Library moved out of Rivington Place, to the Chelsea College of Arts in Pimlico.

== Publishing ==
Iniva operated as an arts publishing house, often working in collaboration with larger publishers and producing books by writers such as the cultural theorist Kobena Mercer, curator and educator Sarat Maharaj, artist Sonia Boyce the art historian Guy Brett, and the art critic Jean Fisher.

== Education and youth ==
Alongside its exhibitions and publications, the institute also runs a visual arts education programme, consisting of lectures, educational workshops and seminars. Based in the London borough of Westminster, the institute has developed a consistent strategy of working with young people, aimed at extending the field of arts education to include wider cultural objectives such as 'social inclusion' and personal development.

== Governance ==
Iniva has charitable status under UK law and is governed by a board of trustees. Over the years board membership has included prominent figures in the world of ideas and the arts, including Stuart Hall, Yinka Shonibare, Sarat Maharaj, Henry Louis Gates Jr, and Isaac Julien.
