= Humber Street Gallery =

Art gallery in Kingston upon Hull, England

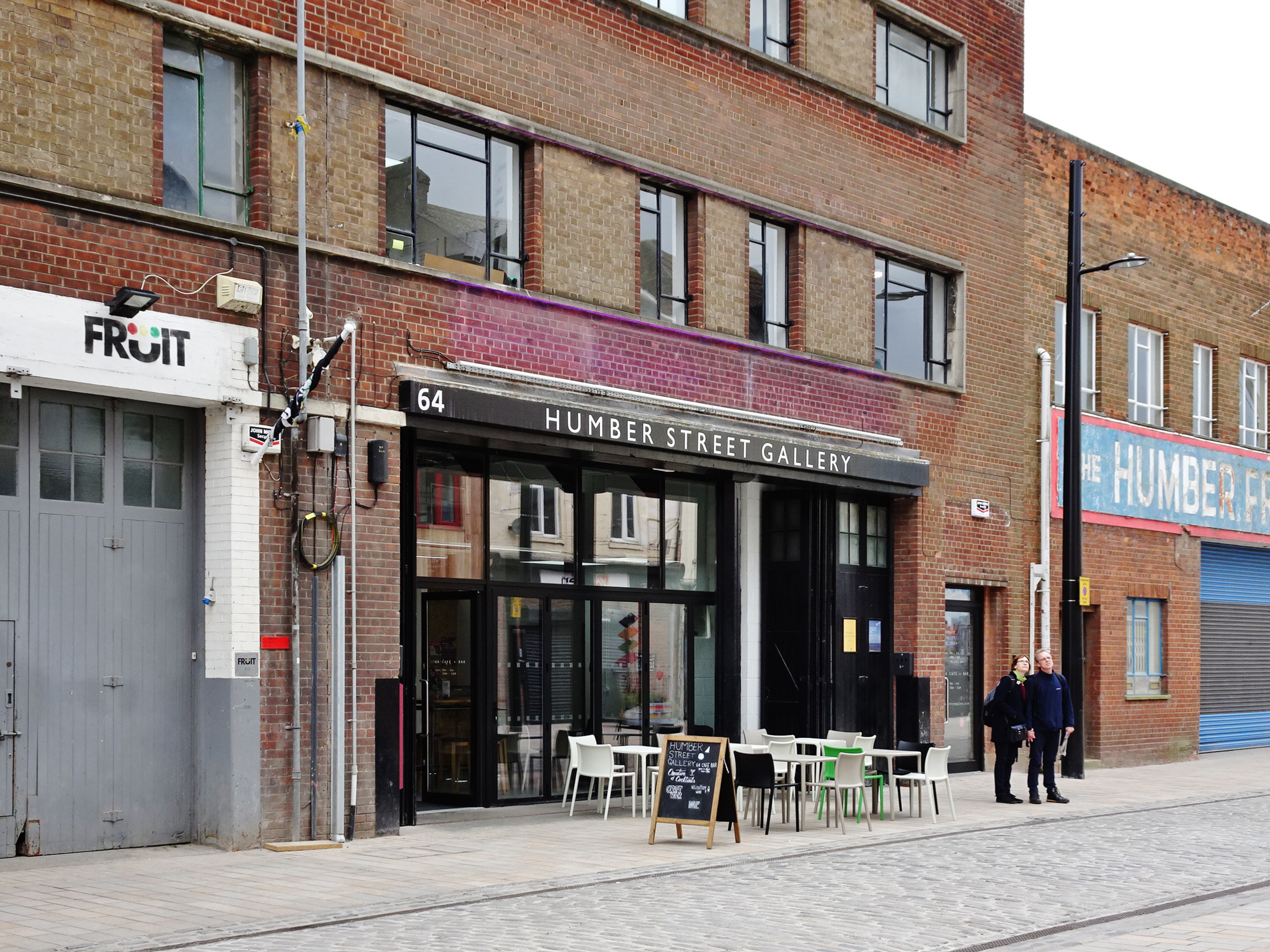

- Location within the East Riding of Yorkshire
- Established: 2017
- Location: Fruit Market, Hull
- Coordinates: 53.7390°N 0.3347°W
- Website: https://www.absolutelycultured.co.uk/humberstreetgallery/

Humber Street Gallery is an art gallery in the English city of Kingston upon Hull, and an Absolutely Cultured project. It hosts a year-round exhibitions programme as well as events, performances and activities. The three-storey gallery was opened in February 2017 as part of that year's Hull UK City of Culture event, with exhibitions by the COUM Transmissions collective and Sarah Lucas. Humber Street Gallery has since housed exhibitions from artists such as Bloomberg New Contemporaries 2022, Hetain Patel, Oliver Ressler and more.

The gallery's café includes the local "Dead Bod" graffiti, relocated from its original site on a corrugated iron shed on Riverside Wharf. The artwork is a human-sized depiction of a dead bird, supposedly painted by Captain Len ‘Pongo’ Rood and Chief Engineer Gordon Mason in the 1960s, and was a prominent feature on the city's docks.

Humber Street Gallery is located in a former fruit and vegetable warehouse in Hull's Fruit Market district.
