= Autograph ABP =

British-based photographic arts agency

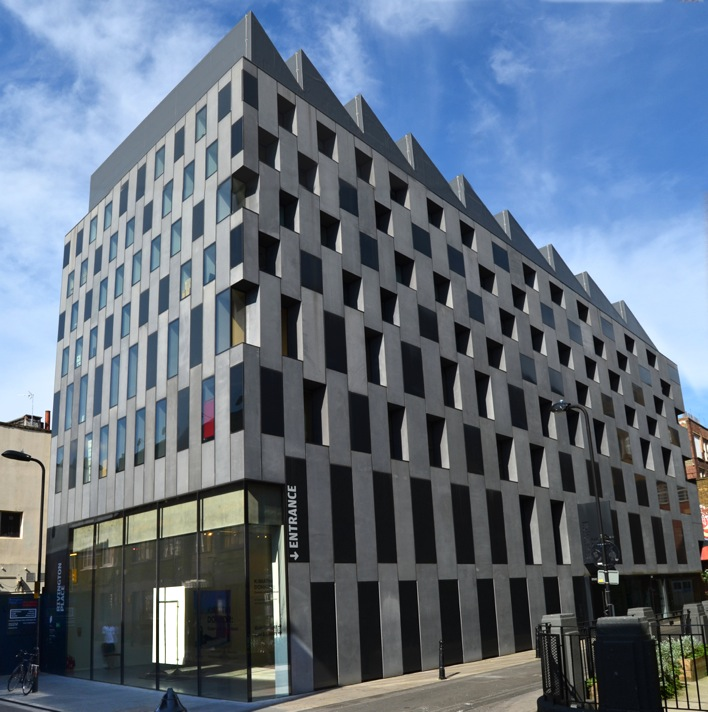
- Rivington Place, home of Autograph ABP
- Established: 1988; 38 years ago
- Type: Photographic arts agency
- Headquarters: Rivington Place, Shoreditch, London.
- Key people: Mark Sealy (director)
- Website: autograph.org.uk
- Formerly called: Association of Black Photographers

Autograph ABP, previously known as the Association of Black Photographers, is a British-based international, non-profit-making, photographic arts agency.

== History ==
Autograph was originally established in London in 1988. Founders included the photographers Sunil Gupta, Monika Baker, Merle Van den Bosch, Pratibha Parmar, Ingrid Pollard, Roshini Kempadoo, Armet Francis and Rotimi Fani-Kayode, as the Association of Black Photographers. Through a programme of advocacy, exhibitions and publication, Autograph went on to assist in the career development of a number of black and "culturally diverse" photographers, including Faisal Abdu'Allah, Gayle Chong Kwan, Roshini Kempadoo and Yinka Shonibare.

In 1991, Mark Sealy became the director of the organisation. In 2002, the board changed the name to "Autograph ABP". In 2007, the organisation moved into its new home Rivington Place, which it shared with Iniva. Renowned Cultural Studies theorist Stuart Hall served as chair on the boards of both organisations. Currently, the honorary patrons of Autograph ABP are David Lammy MP, Professor Catherine Hall, Lola Young (Baroness Young of Hornsey) OBE, and Henry Louis Gates Jr.

In 2008, Autograph received a grant of £660,500 from the Heritage Lottery Fund (HLF) to "preserve the history of culturally diverse Britain through photography".

== Role ==
Today, Autograph continues to develop, exhibit and publish the work of photographers and artists from culturally diverse backgrounds and to act as an advocate for their inclusion in mainstream areas of exhibition, publishing, training, education and commerce. Autograph produces its own programme of activities, as well as collaborating with other arts organisations nationally and internationally, such as the Liverpool Biennial. It also sees itself as playing a role in the advocacy of human rights worldwide, hosting exhibitions on the subjects of Roma/Gypsy peoples in Europe, as well as the photographic legacy of lynching in the US. Regular (annual) funding for Autograph is provided by Arts Council England.

== See also ==
- Iniva – Institute of International Visual Art
