= Tom Wood (photographer) =

Irish photographer

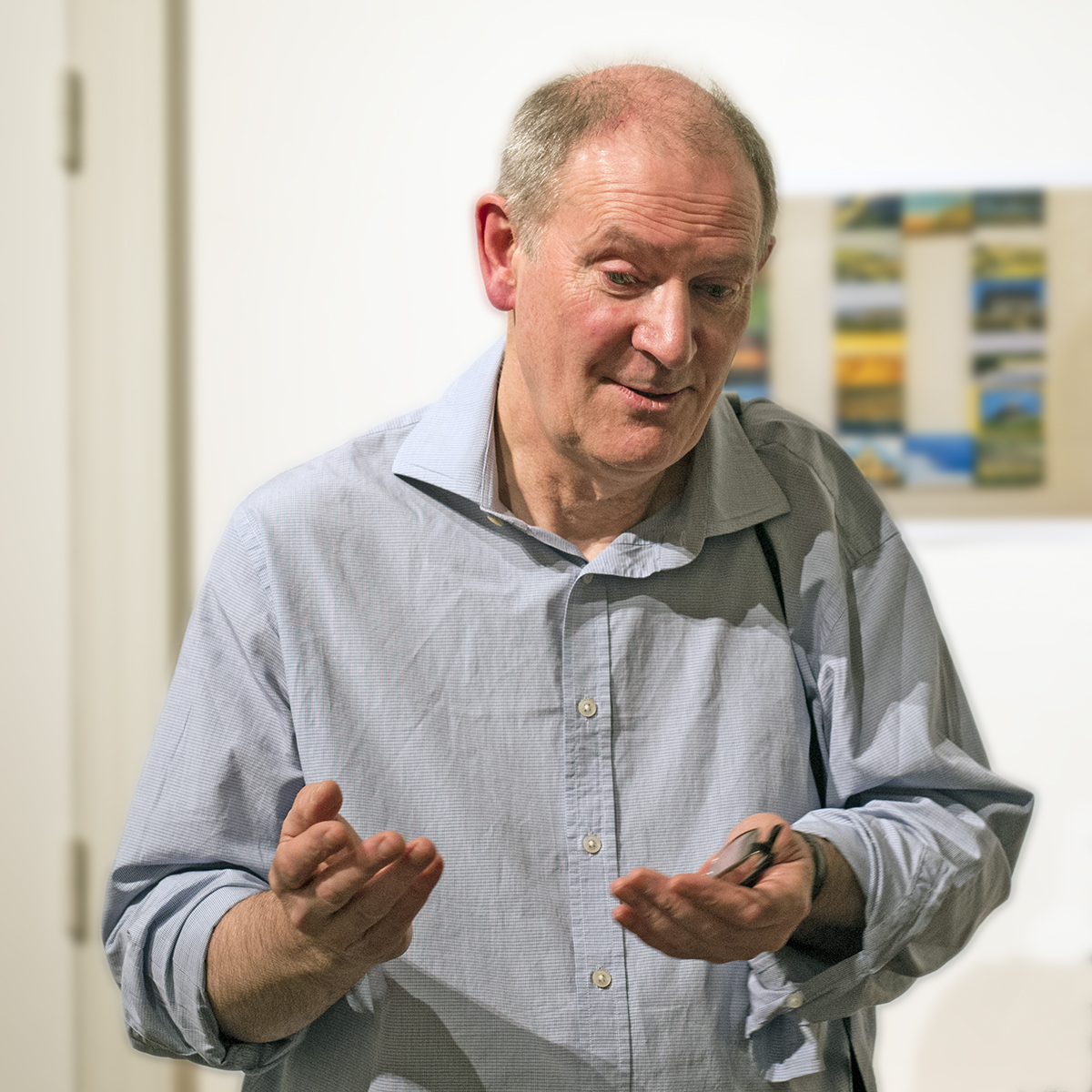
- Born: 14 January 1951 (age 75); County Mayo, Ireland
- Known for: Photography
- Awards: Prix Dialogue de l'Humanite at the Rencontres d'Arles in 2002, and short-listed for the Becks Futures Award, 2001

Tom Wood (born 14 January 1951) is an Irish born photographer and artist, based in Wales. Wood is best known for his photographs in Liverpool and Merseyside from 1978 to 2001, "on the streets, in pubs and clubs, markets, workplaces, parks and football grounds" of "strangers, mixed with neighbours, family and friends." His work is represented in the collections of major collections and museums worldwide.

== Life and work ==
Wood was born in Crossmolina, County Mayo in the West of Ireland. His family left for England as a child when his mother, a Catholic, was forced away after marrying his father, a Protestant. He trained as a conceptual painter at Leicester Polytechnic from 1973 to 1976. Extensive viewing of experimental films led him to photography, in which he is self-taught. He has explored a "multiplicity of formally divergent themes and quotations" with an approach "much more fluid than the current conventions of post-Conceptual photography or photojournalism dictate". In 1978 Wood moved to Merseyside, and in 2003 to North Wales.

Wood photographed mainly in Liverpool and Merseyside from 1978 to 2001, primarily street photography "on the streets, in pubs and clubs, markets, workplaces, parks and football grounds" of "strangers, mixed with neighbours, family and friends." At the same time he also worked on a long-term study of the landscape in the west of Ireland, North Wales and Merseyside. He has returned to the west of Ireland every year since his family left.

The pictures in Wood's first book and most famous series, Looking For Love (1989), show people up close and personal at the Chelsea Reach disco pub in New Brighton, Merseyside, where he photographed regularly between 1982 and 1985. This was followed by All Zones Off Peak (1998), which featureds in The Photobook: A History vol. 2 (2006). All Zones Off Peak includes photographs from 18 years of riding the buses of Liverpool during his 1978 to 1996 'bus odyssey'—the images selected from about 100,000 negatives. People (1999), and the retrospective book Photie Man (2005), made in collaboration with Irish artist Padraig Timoney, followed. His work is included in the revised edition of Bystander: A History of Street Photography (2001).

Wood's first major British show, Men and Women, was at The Photographers' Gallery in London in 2012. His first full UK retrospective was at the National Media Museum in Bradford in 2013. His landscape photographs were exhibited for the first time in 2014.

The critic Sean O'Hagan has described Wood as "a pioneering colourist", "a photographer for whom there are no rules" with an "instinctive approach to photographing people up close and personal" and quotes photographer Simon Roberts saying Wood's photographs "somehow combine rawness and intimacy in a way that manages to avoid the accusations of voyeurism and intrusion that often dog work of this kind." Phill Coomes of BBC News wrote that "wherever they were taken or made, his pictures seem always to have a trace of human existence, and at their centre they are about the lives that pass through the spaces depicted." The New Yorker's photography critic, Vince Aletti, described Wood's style as "loose, instinctive and dead-on" adding "he makes Martin Parr look like a formalist".

== Publications ==
- Looking for Love: Chelsea Reach. Manchester: Cornerhouse, 1989. ISBN 978-0948797453.
- All Zones off Peak. Stockport: Dewi Lewis, 1998. ISBN 978-1899235865. With an afterword by Mark Holborn.
- People. Cologne: Wienand, 1999. ISBN 978-3879096664. English and German text.
- Tom Wood. Saar, Germany: Galerie im Buergerhaus Neunkirchen, 2000. ISBN 978-3879096664. Exhibition catalogue. English and German text.
- Bus Odyssey. Ostfildern-Ruit, Germany: Hajte Cantz, 2001. ISBN 978-3775711227. Exhibition catalogue. With an essay by Sylvia Böhmer. German and English text.
- Not Only Female…. Cologne: Schaden, 2004. ISBN 978-3932187407. Exhibition catalogue. With an essay by Joerg Bader, "Broken English Working Class Hero", in English and German.
- Photie Man. Göttingen: Steidl, 2005. ISBN 978-3865210838.
- F/M. Villeurbanne, France: 205. ISBN 978-2-919380-07-7. English and French text. With a preface by Gilles Verneret and text by Durden Mark. Edition of 750 copies. A subset of photographs from Photie Man.
- Men and Women. Göttingen: Steidl, 2012. ISBN 978-3869305707. A two volume collection.
- The DPA Work. Göttingen: Steidl, 2014. A two-volume collection, one on Rainhill Hospital in Liverpool (1988–1990) and one on Cammell Laird shipyard (1993–1996) in Birkenhead, commissioned by the Documentary Photography Archive.
- Termini. Guingamp, France: Gwinzegal, 2018. ISBN 979-10-94060-21-6. With three short texts by Paul Farley.
- Women's Market. London: Stanley/Barker, 2018. ISBN 978-1-9164106-0-2. Photographs of the Great Homer Street market (Everton), 1978–1999. Edition of 1000 copies. (Note: Stanley/Barker's page about the book is here.)
- 101 Pictures. Bristol: RRB, 2020. Selected by Martin Parr, edited and sequenced by Padraig Timoney. Edition of 1500 copies.
- People of the Lane. Living in and around Lark Lane, 1880-2020. An oral history by Kay Flavell: Introduction by Bryan Biggs, 28 color photographs by Tom Wood. Vallejo: New Pacific Studio, 2021. ISBN 978-0-578-70934-5.
- Snatch out of time. Tokyo: Super Labo, 2022.

== Awards ==
- Terence Donovan Award, Royal Photographic Society, Bath, 1998
- Prix Dialogue de l'Humanite, Rencontres d'Arles, France, 2002

== TV appearances ==
- What Do Artists Do All Day? (BBC, 2014)

== Exhibitions ==
=== Solo exhibitions ===
- International Centre of Photography, New York, 1996.
- All Zones off Peak, Gallery of Photography Ireland, 1999.
- Suermondt-Ludwig Museum, Aachen, Germany, 2001.
- Kasseler Kunstverein, Kassel, Germany, 2002.
- Stadtische Galerie, Wolfsburg, 2002.
- Kunsthalle, Wilhelmshaven, 2002.
- Photieman, Castlefield Gallery, Manchester, 2003
- Sad Beautiful Life, C/O Berlin, Berlin, Germany, 2003.
- Kunsthalle Bremen, Bremen, Germany, 2004.
- 2005: Photieman, Le château d’eau, pôle photographique de Toulouse, Toulouse, France.
- Foam Fotografiemuseum Amsterdam, Amsterdam, 2005.
- 2005: Looking for Love, Musée de l'Élysée, Lausanne, Switzerland (with Larry Sultan).
- Men and Women, The Photographers' Gallery, London; Gallery of Photography, Dublin, 2013/2014.
- Tom Wood – DPA Work, Contemporary Art Space Chester, University of Chester, Chester, 2013. (Photographs of Rainhill Hospital (1988–1990), commissioned by the Documentary Photography Archive (DPA), Manchester and made before the closure of the institution.)
- Tom Wood – DPA Work, Contemporary Art Space Chester, University of Chester, Chester, 2013. Photographs of Cammell Laird shipyard (1993–1996) in Liverpool, commissioned by the DPA and made before the closure of the institution.
- Tom Wood: Photographs 1973–2013, 8 March – 16 June 2013. National Media Museum, Bradford, 2013.
- Landscapes, Oriel Mostyn, Llandudno, Wales, 2014. Curated by Mark Durden.
- Photie Man: 50 Years of Tom Wood, Walker Art Gallery, Liverpool, 20 May 2023 – 7 January 2024. A retrospective, curated by Charlotte Keenan.

=== Group exhibitions ===
- The Sidewalk Never Ends: Street Photography Since the 1970's, Art Institute of Chicago, Chicago, IL, 2001/2002
- Photography Collection: Rotation 3, Museum of Modern Art, New York, 2006.
- Every Man and Woman is a Star: Photographs by Martin Parr and Tom Wood, Walker Art Gallery, Liverpool, 2013. With Martin Parr.

== Collections ==
Wood's work is held in the following public collections:

- International Centre of Photography, New York: 1 print (as of May 2019)
- Art Institute of Chicago, Chicago, IL: 4 prints (as of May 2019)
- National Photography Collection, National Science and Media Museum, Bradford
- Walker Art Gallery, Liverpool
- Deutsche Börse Photography Foundation, Frankfurt a. M.

== See also ==
- Martin Parr
- Paul Graham
