= Pogus Caesar =

British artist, TV producer and director

- Born: 1953 (age 72–73); St. Kitts, West Indies
- Known for: Photography and curation

Pogus Caesar (born 1953) is a British artist, archivist, author, curator, television producer and director. He was born in St Kitts, West Indies, and grew up in Birmingham, England.

== Early life ==
Caesar was born on the Caribbean island of Saint Kitts. At an early age, he moved to Birmingham, England.

== Career ==
Caesar has personally exhibited and curated numerous exhibitions on photography.

During the early 1980s, Caesar was appointed director of the West Midlands Minority Arts Service. He was the first chairman of Birmingham International Film & Television Festival.

As a photographer and artist, Caesar has worked in Spain, India, South America, Sweden, Denmark, South Africa, Albania, and Jamaica, documenting diverse communities. Caesar's artwork and photographs have been acquired by the National Portrait Gallery,

In 2022, Caesar was named in CasildART's list of the top six Black British photographers, including Charlie Phillips, Armet Francis, Neil Kenlock and James Barnor.
