= The Voices of East Harlem =

American vocal ensemble

- Origin: East Harlem, New York City
- Genres: R&B, soul
- Years active: 1969–1974
- Labels: Elektra, Just Sunshine
- Past members: Chuck Griffin (founder); Anna Griffin (co-founder); Bernice Cole (music director); Gerri Griffin; Cynthia Sessions; Monica Burruss; Bernard Graham; Wayne Garfield; Jerome Mack; Elaine Clark; Kevin Griffin; Claudia Moore; Debra Raby

The Voices of East Harlem was an African-American vocal ensemble of up to 20 singers, aged between 12 and 21. Founded as a community initiative in 1969, the group performed with top soul and R&B musicians and recorded four albums in the early and mid-1970s.

== History ==
The group originated in an inner-city action project in East Harlem, New York City, in 1969. Charles "Chuck" Griffin, founder of the East Harlem Federation Youth Association (EHFYA), and his wife Anna Quick Griffin, set up the ensemble, initially to perform in colleges and at local benefits. The group was initially largely uninterested in stage performance, however.

Their first major performance was at a benefit for Mayor John Lindsay, after which they attracted music director Bernice Cole (5 November 1921–19 November 2006), who had been a member of the Angelic Gospel Singers, to which she later returned. They also gained a manager, Jerry Brandt, who had previously worked with Sam Cooke and who persuaded the ensemble to update their material and style.

On New Year's Eve, 1969, the group opened for Jimi Hendrix at the Fillmore East. In January 1970, they performed at the "Winter Festival for Peace" at Madison Square Garden on a bill with Harry Belafonte, Richie Havens, Judy Collins, Dave Brubeck, Blood, Sweat & Tears, Peter, Paul and Mary, The Rascals, Jimi Hendrix (who abandoned his performance after two numbers), and the cast of Hair. They made regular TV appearances, and recorded an album for Elektra Records, Right On Be Free, released in 1970. The album focused on ensemble singing in a traditional black gospel style, but with secular lyrics emphasising "the power of the people", and a "soulful feel". Several of the tracks, including the title track "Right On, Be Free", were written by Chuck Griffin. Lead vocals on Right On Be Free were by Cole, Anna Griffin, Gerri Griffin, and Cynthia Sessions. The backing musicians included Richard Tee, Cornell Dupree, Chuck Rainey, and Ralph MacDonald, and the album was produced by David Rubinson. The group received a standing ovation at the 1970 Isle of Wight Festival in the UK, appeared at the Apollo Theater, and performed in Ghana in February 1971 at the Soul To Soul concert. Reviewing the LP in Christgau's Record Guide: Rock Albums of the Seventies (1981), Robert Christgau wrote: "Producer-manager Jerry Brandt has done a pretty good job of recording this untransportable troupe of twenty or so black adolescents. Except for an unnecessary 'Proud Mary' and an embarrassing 'Let It Be Me' (a/k/a 'Let It Be Us'), it shouts and almost jumps, just like church, or a basketball tournament. Michael Jackson Award: Kevin Griffin on the 6:45-minute 'Shaker Life.'"

In 1972, they released a second album on Elektra, Brothers and Sisters, with some tracks produced by Donny Hathaway. They also lent a track to the Free to Be... You and Me project produced by Marlo Thomas (where they were billed as Brothers and Sisters). Eighteen months later, the same track was filmed under their own name for the prime time ABC-TV special of the project.

Subsequently, they also performed in a concert at Sing Sing prison with B.B. King and Joan Baez. which was filmed for a documentary. The following year they moved to the Just Sunshine label owned by promoter Michael Lang, and released a third album, The Voices of East Harlem, produced by Curtis Mayfield, Leroy Hutson, and Rich Tufo. By this time, their lead vocalists were Gerri Griffin and Monica Burruss (later to be featured in various Barry Manilow tours. Other singers included Bernard Graham, Wayne Garfield, Jerome Mack, Elaine Clark, Cynthia Sessions, Kevin Griffin and Claudia Moore. The album yielded a minor hit single, "Giving Love" produced by Mayfield, which reached no. 57 on the Billboard R&B chart in 1973. The single "Wanted Dead or Alive" was later reissued as a 12" remix and the group released its final album in 1974, Can You Feel It, produced by Hutson.

Monica Burruss (a.k.a. Monica Pege) later recorded and performed as a session and backing singer before joining Lady Flash and as a solo performer known by Monica.

== Discography ==
=== Albums ===
- Right On Be Free (Elektra, 1970)
- Brothers & Sisters (Elektra, 1972)
- The Voices Of East Harlem (Just Sunshine, 1973)
- Can You Feel It (Just Sunshine, 1974)

=== Singles ===
- "No! No! No!" (East Harlem Federation Youth Association, 1970)
- "Right On Be Free" (Elektra, 1970)
- "Oxford Town" (Elektra, 1971)
- "Angry" (Elektra, 1972)
- "Giving Love" (Just Sunshine, 1973)
- "Cashin' In" (Just Sunshine, 1973)
- "Wanted Dead or Alive" (Just Sunshine, 1974)
