= Rivington Place =

International visual arts centre in London, England

Coordinates: 51.5263°N 0.0794°W

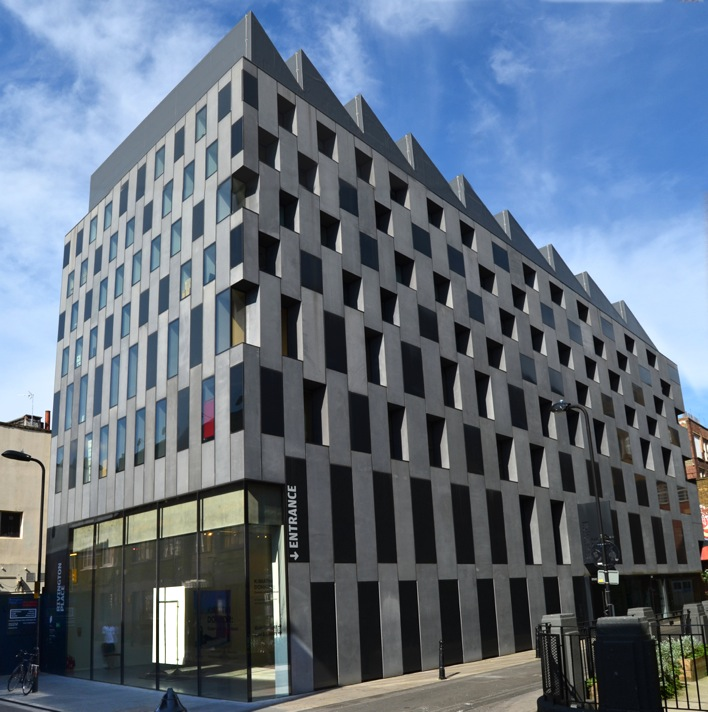
- Interactive map of the Rivington Place area

General information
- Type: Gallery
- Architectural style: Postmodern
- Location: London, United Kingdom
- Opened: 3 October 2007

Technical details
- Floor area: 1,445 sq m

Design and construction
- Architect: David Adjaye
- Architecture firm: Adjaye Associates
- Structural engineer: Techniker Ltd
- Quantity surveyor: Bucknall Austin Ltd

Rivington Place is a purpose-built international visual arts centre in Shoreditch, London.

== Origins and history ==
Rivington Place was commissioned by two publicly funded visual arts organisations, Iniva and Autograph ABP, with the intention of establishing the new venue as a major international visual arts centre in Shoreditch, Central London. In the late 20th century, this part of the East End emerged as a new arts quarter, famous for harbouring the Young British Artists (YBA) movement, with leading private galleries such as White Cube in nearby Hoxton Square. Both Iniva and Autograph were founded to reflect and promote cultural diversity in the visual arts, and it was hoped that the new building would advance this aim. The five-storey building was designed by leading architect David Adjaye and opened to the public on 5 October 2007. It cost £8 million to complete and was the first publicly funded new-build international art gallery in London since the Hayward Gallery opened more than 40 years earlier.

== Function and activities ==
Primarily a free public gallery, for most of the year, the two exhibition spaces are used to show contemporary visual art shows. With 15,000-square-foot (1,400 m^{2}) of space, the venue also houses education facilities and seminar rooms as well as the offices Autograph.

== Significant exhibitions ==
Featuring in the programme of exhibitions held in the building have been shows by Ghanaian photojournalist James Barnor, British sculptor Hew Locke, French film maker Zineb Sedira and Nigerian/British fine-art photographer Rotimi Fani-Kayode.
