= Gayle Chong Kwan =

British artist

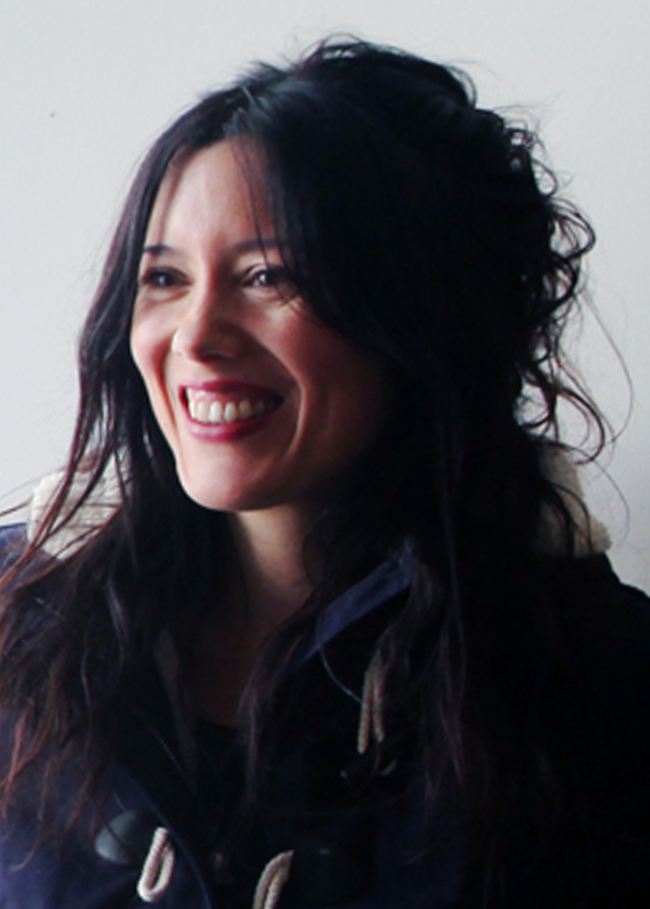
- Gayle Chong Kwan by Georgia Kuhn, 2013
- Born: 1973 (age 52–53); Edinburgh, Scotland
- Education: University of Manchester, University of Stirling, Central Saint Martins College of Art and Design, Royal College of Art
- Known for: Photography, visual arts

Dr Gayle Chong Kwan (born 1973) is a British artist of Chinese Mauritian and Scottish heritage who lives and works in London. Her practice includes photography, installation, sculpture, moving image, mixed reality and performance, and often uses food, waste materials, found objects and archival sources.

Her work has addressed subjects including ecology, migration, colonialism, memory and social history. Independent coverage of her work has particularly discussed her use of archival material and material histories to examine colonialism, migration and relationships between places.

Chong Kwan is a Lecturer in Fine Art at Central Saint Martins and completed a PhD in Fine Art at the Royal College of Art. She has exhibited in Britain and internationally, including at the Victoria and Albert Museum, Barbican Centre, Southbank Centre and Compton Verney. She gives talks, lectures and workshops on her practice and research and is represented by Galerie Alberta Pane in Paris and Venice.

== Work ==
Chong Kwan's works often develop from research into places, objects, collections and histories, which she translates into photographic compositions, installations and participatory projects. Her work combines materials including food remains, waste, found objects, archival sources and documentary imagery. Critics have discussed the relationship between these materials and questions of colonial history, migration, memory and the politics of institutions.

Her early work developed through constructed photographic landscapes and investigations of place, travel and cultural memory. Projects such as The Land of Peach Blossom (2008), Thames Town (2008), City of Lights (2008), Terroir and the Pathetic Fallacy (2009), The Grand Tour (2009), Save the Last Dance for Me (2010), The Obsidian Isle (2011) and Invisible Twinning (2011) explored imagined landscapes, tourism, migration and relationships between real and fictional places. In this period Chong Kwan also produced Cockaigne (2009), a series of large-format photographs made in collaboration with specialist restaurants, shown as part of Tales from the New World at the 10th Havana Biennial; Arte por Excelencias described the series as using food to trace processes of globalisation across different national cuisines. Discussing her installation Waterscape (2011) for the South China Morning Post, Chong Kwan described art as a way of approaching, reflecting on and imagining different possibilities for how people might live.

A significant strand of Chong Kwan's practice concerns waste, food and the construction of landscapes from discarded materials. Wastescape (2012), presented at the Southbank Centre in London, brought together thousands of discarded plastic bottles and food-packaging materials to create miniature architectural forms, alongside oral histories from Moravia in Medellín, Colombia, and London. A related version of the work was shown in the group exhibition The Politics of Food at the Delfina Foundation, London, in 2014; Londonist described Chong Kwan's plastic-bottle city as an optimistic recognition that recycled materials might become commonplace in construction. The later Wastescape: weaving landscapes of politics, dairy, and waste (2019) developed this interest in waste and ecology through an installation made from used plastic milk bottles in Auckland, while Waste Archipelago (2021), shown at Galerie Alberta Pane in Venice, continued this exploration of sustainability through photographic and paper-based works made from food waste and organic material.

Chong Kwan has also produced work for outside institutions and platforms; she created a station ident for ITV built from used milk bottles cut and arranged to reference British landmarks including St Paul's Cathedral, Edinburgh Castle and the Millennium Centre in Wales.

Chong Kwan's collaborative and participatory approach is also evident in The People's Forest (2018), a project developed through workshops, walks and installations relating to Epping Forest and the surrounding urban environment. The project considered the forest as a site of protest, contested resources and tensions between common land and development. The associated sculpture The Fairlop Oak, exhibited at the Barbican Centre, incorporated branches, miniature houses made by participants and a structure referring to both the forest and the M11 Link Road protests. Domus described the sculpture as an 11-metre-high, hybrid contemporary-historical installation combining branches gathered from Epping Forest with small houses made from waste packaging, extending through three floors of the Barbican's foyers. Reviewing the related exhibition at William Morris Gallery, the Contemporary Art Society discussed Chong Kwan's engagement with the forest as a contested site of protest and conflict between capital and common, and connected the work to William Morris's own campaigning to save Epping Forest.

During the Covid-19 pandemic, Chong Kwan created Dream Tapestry (2020), a communal tapestry of dreams produced in partnership with the London Borough of Waltham Forest. Writing in i, journalist Ellie Broughton profiled the project as an attempt to turn the shared, often strange subconscious material of collective lockdown dreams into art.

Her later work has increasingly engaged with museums, collections and colonial histories. The Circulating Department (2021) developed from her residency in photography at the Victoria and Albert Museum between 2019 and 2021. The project examined the movement of objects and the work of people involved in transporting, conserving, cleaning and managing museum collections.

The Taotie (2024), developed at Compton Verney, combined photographic self-portraits, masks made from archival imagery and sculptural forms. The work drew on the museum's collections of miniature portraits and Chinese bronzes while examining diasporic identity, colonial histories and the relationship between objects, memory and ritual. In a five-star review in The Observer, art critic Laura Cumming described the installation as bringing together archival photographs and documents with histories of empire, sugar plantations, servitude and immigration, while connecting Chong Kwan's masks to the ancient Chinese art displayed at Compton Verney.

A Pocket Full of Sand (2024) connected the Alum Bay sands on the Isle of Wight with the Seven Coloured Earths in Mauritius through photography, sculpture and moving image. The work explored the relationship between geological time and colonial history, including the histories of sugar production, slavery and indentured labour in Mauritius. BBC News reported on the exhibition's exploration of historical and contemporary connections between the two islands, including an element inviting visitors to eat a sugar cube as part of the work's sensory address to complex, shared colonial histories. Studio International described the work's use of sand and sugar as a way of connecting colonial and contemporary histories, while noting the contrast between tourism on the Isle of Wight and the history of sugar production in Mauritius. In a critical essay commissioned by Film and Video Umbrella, writer Adam Bobbette examined the exhibition's treatment of sand and sugar as parallel "granular" materials linking geological time, the plantation economy and the body, discussing works including the wall-spanning collage panorama and the sculptural forms made from bagasse.

A review by Recessed Space similarly examined the relationship between the two locations and the work's treatment of colonial histories and sugar production.

In 2024 Chong Kwan also presented I am the Thames and the Thames is Me as part of Vital Signs: another world is possible at Science Gallery London. Developed through collaboration with researchers at King's College London, the installation considered the Thames through environmental research and relationships between human health and the health of waterways.

In 2025, Chong Kwan presented Politics of the Gaze at Galerie Alberta Pane in Paris. The exhibition brought together Cyclops (2024) and A Pocket Full of Sand (2024), addressing colonial histories, surveillance, mythology and expanded forms of visuality.

Her mixed-reality installation Oneiric Archaeologies (2025), developed with Kialy Tihngang, explored archaeology, deep time and dreaming through digital landscapes, sound and wearable sculptural forms. The work drew on research at the Avebury World Heritage Site and the Alexander Keiller Museum archives.

In 2026, Chong Kwan presented The Great Instauration at the National Museum of Scotland as part of the Edinburgh Science Festival. The installation drew on research across museum, scientific and botanical collections and examined histories of scientific knowledge, extraction, colonialism, medicine and the natural world. Independent coverage in The List described the project as confronting Scotland's scientific past and discussed Chong Kwan's treatment of colonial and gendered assumptions within scientific history. Edinburgh Reviews also discussed the exhibition's archival research and its questioning of science as an apparently objective discipline. Inter|Alia Magazine described the installation as an underground, upside-down world of forms hanging from the Grand Gallery's railings and columns, transforming scientific instruments into fantastical roots and geological strata. The Edinburgh Reporter interviewed Chong Kwan about the work's response to the Grand Gallery's Enlightenment-era architecture and her reworking of scientific instruments into fantastical growths, and The Scotsman reported on the installation as part of its coverage of the 2026 Edinburgh Science Festival programme.

Her installation The Lotus Eaters was presented at Fondation Valmont's Palazzo Bonvicini in Venice from May 2026 to January 2027. The work combined sculpture, fabric, moving image, virtual reality and procession to reconsider domesticity, hospitality, resistance and the figure of Penelope from Greek mythology.

== Personal life and education ==
Gayle Chong Kwan was born in Edinburgh, Scotland, to a Scottish mother and Chinese Mauritian father. She lives in East London with her two sons.

She has a BA Hons in Politics and Modern History from the University of Manchester, a BA Hons in Fine Art from Central Saint Martins College of Art and Design, an MSc in Communications from the University of Stirling, an MA in Information Experience Design from the Royal College of Art and a PhD in Fine Art from the Royal College of Art, where her doctoral research was titled Imaginal Travel: political and ecological positioning through fine art practice.

== Awards ==
- 'Sustainable Art Prize', commission to develop the year-long project Waste Matters with academics and students at Ca' Foscari University of Venice.
- British Council/Arts Council England International Artist Award – 'Photography in the Public Realm New York' (2015)
- 'Wandering Waste', Stills, Edinburgh, and Deveron Arts, Huntly, Royal Scottish Academy Award (2014)
- FATHOM Award, Four Corners, London (2014)
- Refocus: the Castlegate mima Photography Prize, Middlesbrough Institute of Modern Art (mima) and Stockton-on-Tees Borough Council (2013), a commission to produce Arripare. GazetteLive reported on the launch of Arripare, a large-scale photographic work covering the exterior of Stockton's Castlegate Shopping Centre, quoting Chong Kwan on her research into the area's landscapes.
- Royal Scottish Academy Award (2013)

== Selected exhibitions, commissions and projects ==
- The Lotus Eaters part of Penelope. Her Journeys, Fondation Valmont, Palazzo Bonvicini, Venice — 5 May 2026 – 31 January 2027.
- Oneiric Archaeologies, Avebury Papers, Southampton City Art Gallery — 13 June–17 October 2026.
- Babel, 100 Photographs to Inherit the World, MUDEC, Milan — 7 March–28 June 2026.
- The Great Instauration, National Museum of Scotland, Edinburgh — 4–19 April 2026.
- The Taotie, Compton Verney — 20 March 2024 – 31 March 2027.
- Politics of the Gaze, Galerie Alberta Pane, Paris — 5 April–17 May 2025.
- A Pocket Full of Sand, Galerie Alberta Pane, Paris — 5 April–17 May 2025.
- I am the Thames and the Thames is Me, Vital Signs: another world is possible, Science Gallery London — 2024.
- A Pocket Full of Sand, John Hansard Gallery, Southampton — 10 February–11 May 2024.
- The Taotie, Compton Verney — 2024.
- Waste Archipelago, Galerie Alberta Pane, Venice — 22 May–24 July 2021.
- The Circulating Department, Victoria and Albert Museum, London — 2019–21.
- Ovation, Royal Albert Memorial Museum, Exeter — 29–31 October 2021.
- Wastescape: weaving landscapes of politics, dairy, and waste — 2019.
- Waste Matters, Ca' Foscari University of Venice — 2019–21.
- Quarantine Archipelago, Far Away, Too Close, Tai Kwun Centre for Arts and Heritage, Hong Kong — 2019.
- Dream Tapestry, London Borough of Waltham Forest — 2020.
- The People's Forest, William Morris Gallery, London — 2018.
- The Politics of Food, Delfina Foundation, London — 2014.
- Tales from the New World, 10th Havana Biennial — 2009.
- Terroir and the Pathetic Fallacy, ArtSway, Lymington, 2009.
