= New Art Exchange =

Contemporary art gallery in Nottingham, England

Coordinates: 52.9659°N 1.1684°W

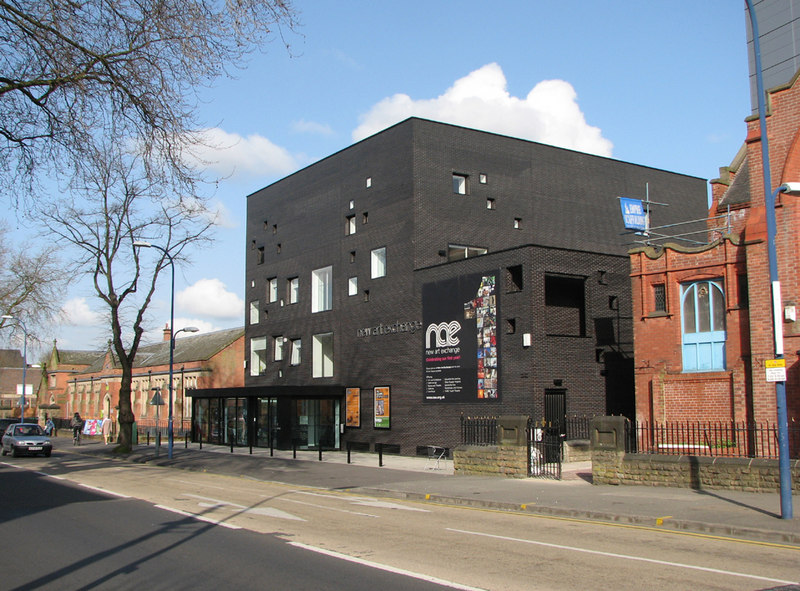
New Art Exchange

New Art Exchange is a contemporary visual arts gallery in the Hyson Green neighbourhood of Nottingham, England. It is the largest cultural centre in the United Kingdom dedicated to showcasing contemporary art from the Global Ethnic Majority and culturally diverse communities. NAE is an Arts Council England National Portfolio Organisation (NPO) and registered charity.

== History ==
New Art Exchange was formed in 2003 through the merger of two grassroots cultural initiatives: APNA Arts, a South Asian arts collective founded by Parbinder Singh, and East Midlands African Caribbean Arts (EMACA), co-founded with educationalist and historian Len Garrison.

In 2021, curator and social practitioner Saad Eddine Said was appointed Chief Executive Officer and Artistic Director. During his tenure, the gallery introduced a citizen-led governance model. In May 2024, NAE established the "VOICE Assembly", the first permanent citizen's assembly embedded into the governance and leadership framework of a major cultural institution. The 40-member assembly, chosen by civic lottery from the local neighbourhood, collaborates alongside the executive team and board of trustees to shape programming, investment, and strategic decisions.

== Architecture ==
The building was designed by Hawkins\Brown and opened in 2008, replacing the former Art Exchange building, previously known as The People's Dispensary. It was officially opened by Laura Dyer from Arts Council England, Michael Williams from Nottingham City Council, and artist Hew Locke on 5 September 2008. In 2009/10 The New Art Exchange building won five design & architecture awards including RIBA’s (Royal Institute of British Architects) National Award, RIBA East Midlands Award, The City of Nottingham Lord Mayor’s Awards for Urban Design (New Build) & Overall Winner, and East Midlands National Civic Trust Award.

== Events ==
New Art Exchange hosted the Nottingham Mela in 2017 and 2018. New Art Exchange hosted Nottingham Mela 2017

== Notable Projects and Platforms ==
- Culture Cloud: In 2012, NAE delivered the Culture Cloud initiative supported by the Digital R&D Fund for Arts and Culture (a collaboration between Nesta, the Arts and Humanities Research Council, and Arts Council England), enabling public digital curation and voting for shortlisted artworks.
- EXHIBIT Open Calls: A recurring flagship commissioning platform that awards major production budgets and institutional support to contemporary practitioners from underrepresented ethnic backgrounds.
- NAE Open: A regional open-submission exhibition platform supporting artists from the East Midlands.
- Community and Public Programmes: The centre regularly hosts cultural celebrations, including the Nottingham Mela, Friday Night Socials, and neighbourhood block parties celebrating sound system and diaspora cultures.
