= Blake Andrews =

American street photographer and blogger

Blake Andrews (29 December 1968) is an American street photographer and blogger based in Eugene, Oregon. Andrews was a member of the In-Public street photography collective.

== Life and work ==
Andrews was born in Berkeley and grew up in Briceland, California. He began photography in 1993, a year after moving to Portland. In 2004, he joined the Portland Grid Project, in which a number of photographers have continued to photograph Portland, square mile by square mile. After moving from Portland to Eugene in 2006, he worked in the similar Eugene Grid Project.

Andrews became a member of the In-Public street photography collective in 2006, and is also a member of Portland-based collective Light Leak.

Andrews mostly works in black and white. His "finely tuned black-and-white photographs" are "so subtle that you need to double-check that you haven't missed something. This is a rare quality. They are a quiet homage to the weird, and often feature children. . . . His style is both subtle and original."

Andrews' blog B is "widely popular" and "one of the most respected in the photographic community". Andrews has been writing it since 2007. Pete Brook said in 2010 that "Andrews' sideways and irreverent commentaries are refreshing in the photoblog zeitgeist."

== Publications ==
=== By Andrews ===
- B Sides: Photographic Playing Cards. Self published, 2011. Edition of 75 copies.
- Eugene Postcard Collection. Self published, 2012. Edition of 10 copies.
- Pictures of the Gone World. MagCloud, 2016. In the series Blue Sky Books, and accompanying the exhibition of the same title at Blue Sky Gallery. (Note: MagCloud's page for this book is here.)
- Need Clean Fill. Bump, 2020. Edited by David Solomons. Edition of 200 copies. (Note: Bump Books' page about this zine is here.)
- Asa Nisi Masa. Bologna: Eyeshot, 2025. ISBN 979-12-80238-64-1. Edition of 385 copies. (Note: Eyeshot's page about this book is here.)

=== With contributions by Andrews ===
- 10 – 10 Years of In-Public. London: Nick Turpin, 2010. ISBN 978-0-9563322-1-9. Includes an essay by Jonathan Glancey, "Outlandish Harmony"; a foreword by Nick Turpin; and a chapter each by Blake Andrews, Nick Turpin, David Gibson, Richard Bram, Matt Stuart, Andy Morley-Hall, Trent Parke, Narelle Autio, Jesse Marlow, Adrian Fisk, Nils Jorgensen, Melanie Einzig, Jeffrey Ladd, Amani Willett, Gus Powell, Christophe Agou, Otto Snoek, David Solomons, George Kelly and Paul Russell.
- Album: Artist Portraits of Artists: The Art Gym 30th Anniversary Exhibition. Marylhurst, Oregon: Marylhurst University, 2010. ISBN 978-0-914435-55-6. Edited by Anne Connell. (Note: A PDF (9.9 MB) of the catalogue is part of the Marylhurst Digital Collection and may be downloaded from here.)
- The Street Photographer's Manual. London: Thames & Hudson, 2014. ISBN 978-0-500-29130-6. By David Gibson. Includes profiles on Blake Andrews, Matt Stuart, Nils Jorgensen, Trent Parke, Jesse Marlow, David Solomons and Narelle Autio; also includes contributions from Paul Russell, Nick Turpin, Richard Bram, Andy Morley-Hall, Gus Powell, and others.
- Sad Songs. San Francisco, 2016. Photographs by Andrews, Joe Aguirre, Aaron Berger, Michelle Groskopf, Todd Gross, Troy Holden, Don Hudson, Ben Molina, Ludmilla Morais, and Missy Prince. 44 page zine.

== Exhibitions ==
=== Solo exhibitions ===
- Photographs: 1996-2001, Gallery Untitled, Portland, OR, March 2001.
- Tilt, Pushdot Studio, Portland, OR, July 2004.
- Male bele laži = Little White Lies, The Artget Gallery, Cultural Centre of Belgrade, Belgrade, Serbia, 25 October – 25 November 2013.
- Pictures of the Gone World. Blue Sky Gallery (Oregon Center for the Photographic Arts), Portland, OR, 2 June – 3 July 2016. Photographs of Andrews' family.

=== Exhibitions with others ===
- Light Leak, Newspace Gallery, Portland, OR, May 2006. Light Leak group show.
- Current Photography: New Directions, Archer Gallery, Clark College, Vancouver, WA, 31 October – 1 December 2006.
- Portland Grid Project, Portland Art Center, 5–27 April 2007.
- In-Public @ 10, Photofusion, London, 28 May – 9 July 2012. (Note: The Photofusion website claims it showed the exhibition in 2012 but it actually did so in 2010.) Travelled to Les Ballades Photographiques de Seyssel, Seyssel, France, 12–23 July 2011. Photographs by In-Public members.
- Album: Artist Portraits of Artists, The Art Gym, Marylhurst University, Oregon, 14 September – 27 October 2010. By 28 photographers, curated by Terri M. Hopkins.
- Out of the Drawers, Blue Sky Gallery, Portland, Oregon, 29 September 2010 – 3 January 2011. By 42 photographers.
- Right Here, Right Now – Exposures From The Public Realm, Derby Museum and Art Gallery, Format International Photography Festival, Derby, UK, March–April 2011. Exhibition of photographs by In-Public members and the film In-Sight (2011).
- From Distant Streets: Contemporary International Street Photography, Galerie Hertz, Louisville Photo Biennial, Louisville, KY, October–November 2011. Part of Louisville Photo Biennial. Curated by Richard Bram. Included 14 In-Public members, of the 29 photographers included.
- iN-PUBLiC: An Exhibition of Street Photography, Thailand Creative and Design Center, Bangkok, Thailand, 5 February – 24 March 2013. Photographs by In-Public members.
- In Public, Snickerbacken 7, Stockholm, Sweden, May–June 2013. Photographs by In-Public members.
- Common Ground: New American Street Photography, New Orleans Photo Alliance. New Orleans, LA, 26 January – 23 March 2013; Drkrm, Los Angeles, CA, 6 – 27 July 2013.
- Springfield Grid Project Photo show, Springfield City Hall Gallery, Springfield, OR, 4–30 November 2013.
- 2015: The Sharp Eye. In-Public in Mexico, Foto Mexico, Cine Tonalá, Mexico City, Mexico, October–November 2015. Slideshow of photographs. Curated by Mark Powell, Carlos Álvarez Montero and Alfredo Esparza.
