= Christophe Agou =

French photographer

Christophe Agou (1969 – September 2015) was a French documentary photographer and street photographer who lived in New York City. His work has been published in books and is held in public collections. He was a member of the In-Public street photography collective.

== Biography ==
Agou was born in Montbrison, France in 1969. A self-taught photographer, Agou grew up in a small town in the Forez region, on the eastern side of the Massif Central.

From the early 1990s, Agou made documentary-style photographs in both black and white and color which take an allusive approach to the human condition. He also made short films and sculpture. In 1992, he moved to New York City. He began taking photographs in the streets that evoked a sense of longing and isolation. He made photographs at Ground Zero on September 11th, 2001, which were used in numerous publications. He first came to prominence with photographs taken in the New York City Subway, published in his book Life Below (2004).

In 2002 Agou returned to Forez. He traveled to the lesser-known parts of the region and got to know a community of family farmers whose identities are deeply rooted to the land. He photographed and filmed them at work and at home for eight years. This resulted in Face au Silence / In the Face of Silence, a documentary about rural life in early twenty-first century France. The work won him the 2010 European Publishers Award for Photography, and publication in six editions and in six languages.

He became a member of the In-Public street photography collective in 2005.

Agou died in September 2015 of cancer.

== Publications ==
=== Publications by Agou ===
- Life Below: The New York City Subway. New York: Quantuck Lane Press, 2004. ISBN 1-59372-008-4.
- Face au Silence. Text by John Berger.
  - Face au Silence. Arles: Actes Sud, 2010. ISBN 2-7427-9542-1.
  - In the Face of Silence. Stockport: Dewi Lewis, 2011. ISBN 1-907893-04-0.
  - Aπέναντι Στη Σιωπή. Apeiron Photos, 2011. ISBN 960-94490-2-6.
  - Ante el Silencio. Barcelona: Lunwerg Editores, 2011. ISBN 978-84-9785-718-5.
  - Gesichter der Stille. Berlin: Edition Braus, 2011. ISBN 3-86228-003-9.
  - Di Fronte al Silenzio. Rome: Peliti Associati, 2011. ISBN 88-89412-47-X.
- Les Faits Secondaires. Christophe Agou, 2013. ISBN 978-1-4675-7085-5. Texts by Agou and John Berger. Poems by Daniel De Bruycker. Edition of 700 copies.

=== Publications with contributions by Agou ===
- 10 – 10 Years of In-Public. London: Nick Turpin Publishing, 2010. ISBN 978-0-9563322-1-9. Includes an essay by Jonathan Glancey, "Outlandish Harmony"; a foreword by Nick Turpin; and a chapter each by Agou, Nick Turpin, David Gibson, Richard Bram, Matt Stuart, Andy Morley-Hall, Trent Parke, Narelle Autio, Jesse Marlow, Adrian Fisk, Nils Jorgensen, Melanie Einzig, Jeffrey Ladd, Amani Willett, Gus Powell, Otto Snoek, Blake Andrews, David Solomons, George Kelly and Paul Russell.
- Photographers' Sketchbooks. London: Thames & Hudson, 2014. ISBN 9780500544341. Edited by Stephen McLaren and Bryan Formhals.
- 100 Great Street Photographs. Munich, London, New York: Prestel, 2017. By David Gibson. ISBN 978-3791383132. Contains a commentary on and a photograph by Agou.

== Films ==
=== Films by Agou ===
- Face au Silence = In the Face of Silence (2011) (Note: The 12-minute film can be seen here at Vimeo.)

=== Films with Agou ===
- In-Sight (2011) – 38-minute documentary directed and edited by Nick Turpin, commissioned by Format for the Format International Photography Festival, Derby, 2011. Includes interviews with Agou, Richard Bram, Melanie Einzig, David Gibson, Jesse Marlow, Gus Powell, Otto Snoek, David Solomons, and Nick Turpin, and shows them at work. (Note: There is a trailer for the film; access to the full film can be bought here at Distrify.)

== Exhibitions ==
=== Solo exhibitions ===
- Face au silence, Rencontres d'Arles Festival, Arles, France. November 2011 – January 2012.
- Face au silence, Fait & Cause Galerie, Paris, France. November 2011 – January 2012.
- Face au silence, Musée d'art Roger Quilliot (MARQ), Clermont-Ferrand, France. 26 January – 29 April 2012.
- Face au silence, Galerie Intervalle, Paris, France. September–October 2014.

=== Group exhibitions ===
- in-public @ 10, Photofusion, Brixton, London, May–July 2010. Travelled to Les Ballades Photographiques de Seyssel, Seyssel, France, 12–23 July 2011, where it also included the film In-Sight (2011) and The French exhibition by Nick Turpin. Included photographs by In-Public members.
- Street Photography Now, Third Floor Gallery, Cardiff, October–November 2010. Photographs from the book Street Photography Now (2011).
- 2015: The Sharp Eye. In-Public in Mexico, Foto Mexico, Cine Tonalá, Mexico City, Mexico, October–November 2015. Slideshow of photographs.

== Awards ==
- 1999: Attention Talent Photo Award Fnac
- 2000: Project Competition, Santa Fe Prize for Photography
- 2002: Honorable Mention, Magazine Picture of the Year
- 2002: AI-AP (American Illustration - American Photography), American Photography Award
- 2006: Finalist, W. Eugene Smith Grant in Humanistic Photography
- 2008: Finalist, Prix de la Photographie de l'Académie des Beaux-Arts de Paris
- 2009: Special Mention, Prix Kodak de la Critique Photographique
- 2010: Winner, European Publishers Award for Photography
- 2012: CNC (Centre National du Cinéma et de l'Image Animée). Commission for Sans Adieu.
- 2013: CNC (Centre National du Cinéma et de l'Image Animée)

== Collections ==
Agou's work is held in the following public collections:

- La Bibliothèque nationale de France, Paris
- Musée d'art Roger Quilliot (MARQ), Clermont-Ferrand, France
- Museum of Fine Arts, Houston, TX
- Neuberger Museum of Art, Purchase, NY
- Smithsonian American Art Museum, Washington, D.C.
- The Akron Art Museum Akron, OH
- Southeast Museum of Photography, Daytona, FL
- New York Public Library, New York
- Frances Lehman Loeb Art Center, Vassar College, Poughkeepsie, NY
- New-York Historical Society, New York
- Fonds national d'art contemporain (FNAC), Paris
- The Joy of Giving Something, New York, NY
