= Third Floor Gallery =

Former photo gallery in Cardiff, Wales

Coordinates: 51.464826°N 3.165902°W

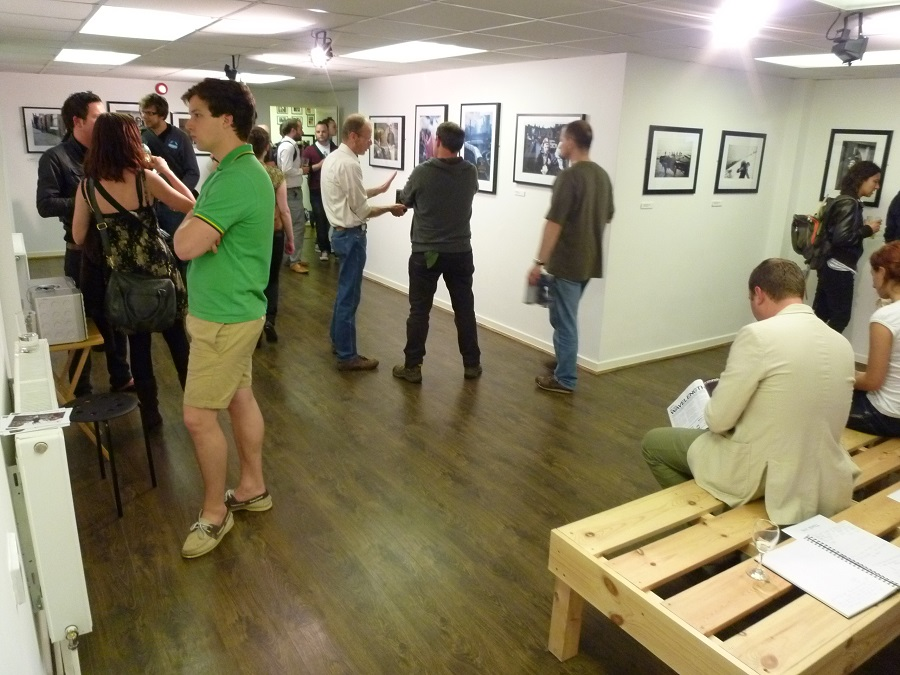
Opening night of The North by John Bulmer, 2011

Third Floor Gallery was an independent charitable photography gallery in Cardiff Bay, Wales that operated from 2010 to 2016. It predominantly featured documentary photography, often premiering new work with the direct involvement of the photographers.

Third Floor Gallery was set up and initially run by photographers Maciej Dakowicz and Joni Karanka, and later photographer Bartosz Nowickii, with help from volunteers. It continued to be self-run with volunteer staff and was self-financed through various grassroots sources. It was noted for its use of social networking for engaging with visitors and volunteers at a time when that was not common place for galleries.

Photographers that exhibited at Third Floor Gallery include Martin Parr, David Hurn, Tom Wood, Chris Steele-Perkins, Larry Fink, Mark Cohen, John Bulmer, Rob Hornstra, Simon Roberts, Peter Dench, Ewen Spencer, Ken Grant and Vanessa Winship.

== Description ==
In January 2010 founding trustees photographers Maciej Dakowicz and Joni Karanka invested £1000 each to cover a quarter of the lease and the service charges for a loft in Bute Street, Cardiff Bay. Third Floor Gallery opened on 12 February 2010 with an exhibition by Peter Dench. From the beginning volunteers helped sustain the gallery with donations of money, and with help hanging exhibitions and staffing. Within the first year of operation, Bartosz Nowicki joined as third trustee and they received charitable status.

The gallery continued to be self-run and self-financed. Rather than being grant funded, it was financed through a variety of grassroots sources: financial donations from visitors; some of those involved in running it auctioned off their own photographs; donations were solicited via requests through social networking services; and the photographer whose exhibition was showing donated an object from or related to that exhibition that was auctioned off.

It was noted for its use of social networking for engaging with visitors and volunteers at a time when that was not common place for galleries.

In March 2012 the gallery expanded to a second floor with an additional gallery, digital darkroom, and dedicated space for community usage. It closed in 2016.

== Awards ==
- 2011 Epic Award (Wales) from Voluntary Arts Network (VAN), for the best voluntary arts groups in the UK and Ireland

== Exhibitions ==
- 2010 – LoveUK by Peter Dench
- 2010 – Up West by David Solomons
- 2010 – Muse by Jocelyn Bain Hogg
- 2010 – ffotoCardiff group exhibition by Jocelyn Allen, Gawain Barnard, Craig Bernard, Rick Davis, Malika Delrieu, Paul Gaffney, Rob Gunn, Radoslaw Komenda, Kate Mercer, Bartosz Nowicki, Gareth Phillips, Chiara Tocci, James Thomson, Rob Watkins and Rajan Zaveri
- 2010 – For Love of the Game by Chris Steele-Perkins
- 2010 – Paradise Rivers by Carolyn Drake
- 2010 – strangelands by strange.rs street photography collective
- 2010 – Street Photography Now. Photographs from the book Street Photography Now (2010) by Christophe Agou, Arif Aşçı, Narelle Autio, Polly Braden, Bang Byoung-Sang, Maciej Dakowicz, Carolyn Drake, Melanie Einzig, George Georgiou, David Gibson, Bruce Gilden, Thierry Girard, Andrew Z. Glickman, Siegfried Hansen, Markus Hartel, Nils Jorgensen, Richard Kalvar, Martin Kollar, Jens Olof Lasthein, Frederic Lezmi, Jesse Marlow, Jeff Mermelstein, Joel Meyerowitz, Mimi Mollica, Trent Parke, Martin Parr, Gus Powell, Mark Alor Powell, Bruno Quinquet, Paul Russell, Otto Snoek, Matt Stuart, Ying Tang, Alexey Titarenko, Nick Turpin, Munem Wasif, Alex Webb, Amani Willett, Michael Wolf, Artem Zhitenev and Wolfgang Zurborn.
- 2010/11 – Passing Time by David Hurn
- 2011 – A Collection by Laura Pannack
- 2011 – Views from Sochi by Rob Hornstra
- 2011 – Mi Vida Loca by Joseph Rodriguez
- 2011 – The North by John Bulmer
- 2011 – The Gathering Clouds by Ben Roberts
- 2011 – Arab Revolutions
- 2011 – Of Duties by Stuart Griffiths, Jay Romano and Tim and Matt Bowditch
- 2011 – Selected Works by Sergey Chilikov
- 2011/12 – Behind the Curtains by Tomas van Houtryve
- 2012 – Larry Fink: Somewhere There's Music by Larry Fink
- 2012 – Touching Strangers by Richard Renaldi
- 2012 – V.D. by Vincent Delbrouck
- 2012 – Family by Chris Verene
- 2012 – The Last Resort by Martin Parr and Tom Wood
- 2012 – Caravan by Rikard Laving
- 2012 – Teenagers by Ewen Spencer
- 2012 – We English by Simon Roberts
- 2012 – Encuentro by Maurice Gunning
- 2012 – Burn My Eye by the Burn My Eye street photography collective, Zisis Kardianos, Charlie Kirk, Andrew Kochanowski, Alexandros Konstantinakis Karmis, Frédéric Le Mauff, TC Lin, JB Maher, Jason Penner, Justin Sainsbury, Jack Simon and Justin Vogel.
- 2012 – Cardiff After Dark by Maciej Dakowicz
- 2012/13 – Winter in America by Justin Maxton and Erin Trieb
- 2012/13 Grim Street by Mark Cohen
- 2013 – After the Fall by Hin Chua
- 2013 – Life After Zog and Other Stories by Chiara Tocci
- 2013 – Urban Quilombo by Sebastian Liste
- 2013 – Georgia by Vanessa Winship
- 2013 – Muse By Jocelyn Bain Hogg
- 2013 – Pictures From the Real World by David Moore
- 2013 – Y Tir Newydd / The New Land by Gareth Phillips
- 2013 – Distant Horizons by Transit Collective, Alexa Brunet, Alexandra Frankewitz, Bastien Defives, David Richard, Nanda Gonzague, Yohanne Lamoulere, Helene Jayet. Part of Diffusion Festival 2013.
- 2013/14 – Close to You by Jacob Aue Sobol.
- 2014 – Shift: Ukraine in crisis. Photographs by Alexander Chekmenev, Maxim Dondyuk, Corentin Fohlen, Louisa Gouliamaki, Brendan Hoffman, Tom Jamieson, Marco Kesseler, Anastasia Taylor-Lind, Donald Weber and Emine Ziyatdinova.
- 2014 – Flock by Ken Grant
- 2014 – Tableaux Vivant by Alexandra Boulat
- 2014 – Swell by Mateusz Sarello
- 2015 – Welsh Farming Community by Peter Jones
- 2015 – Detroit-Unbroken Down by Dave Jordano. Part of Diffusion: Cardiff International Festival of Photography.
- 2015/16 – The Apollo Archive
- 2016 – Europa
