= Dougie Wallace =

British photographer

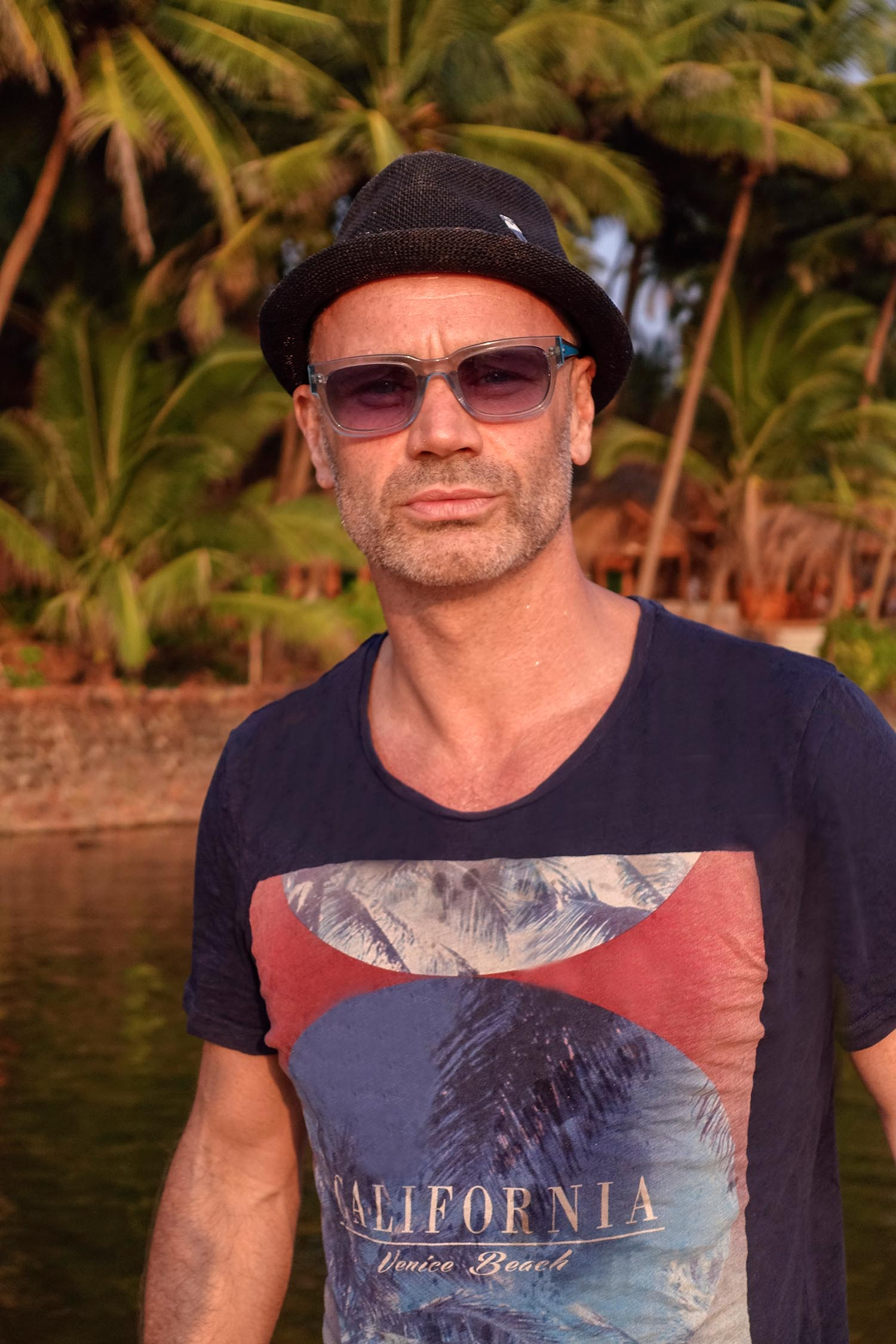
Dougie Wallace in Mumbai, India 2015

Dougie Wallace, also known as Glasweegee, is a Scottish street photographer from Glasgow, based in east London.

He has had five books of his work published and been awarded Second Prize in the Portraiture category of the 2015 Sony World Photography Awards.

== Life and work ==
Wallace was born and raised in Glasgow. He lived in Blackpool for a couple of years in the 1980s before enlisting in the army. He has lived in Shoreditch, east London, for 15 years.

For two-and-a-half years beginning in October 2010 Wallace made 30 trips to Blackpool to complete his first book Stags, Hens & Bunnies: A Blackpool Story (2014), photographs of the stag and hen parties that visit the town, "lads and lasses on their worst behaviour, partying away in a bawdy sea of L-plates, handcuffs, blow-up dolls and uniformed fancy dress", "in various states of undress and drunkenness; revelling in bars, puking in the street, refuelling at chip shops."

Wallace spent 15 years photographing in the Shoreditch area of East London, a series published in his second book, Shoreditch Wild Life (2014).

He photographed the disappearing Premier Padminis in Mumbai for his series Road Wallah.

== Publications ==
=== Books by Wallace ===
- Stags Hens & Bunnies: a Blackpool Story. Stockport: Dewi Lewis, 2014. ISBN 978-1-905928-11-8. With an introduction by Wallace, "The Photographer's Tale".
- Shoreditch Wild Life. Book 4 from the series East London Photo Stories. London: Hoxton Mini Press, 2014. ISBN 978-0-9576998-4-7.
  - Second edition, 2016.
- Road Wallah. Stockport: Dewi Lewis, 2016. ISBN 978-1907893858.
- Harrodsburg. Stockport: Dewi Lewis, 2017. ISBN 978-1-911306-10-8. With an introduction by Peter York.
- Well Heeled. Stockport: Dewi Lewis, 2017. ISBN 978-1-911306-18-4.
- East Ended. Stockport: Dewi Lewis, 2020. ISBN 978-1-911306-60-3. With an essay by Paul Lowe.

=== Zines by Wallace ===
- On The Autofront. London: Bump, 2021. Edited by David Solomons. Edition of 200 copies.
- No Laughing Matter. London: Bump, 2023. Edited by Solomons. Edition of 200 copies.

=== Books with contributions by Wallace ===
- Sony World Photography Awards 2015. London: World Photography Organisation, 2015.
- 100 Great Street Photographs. Munich, London, New York: Prestel, 2017. By David Gibson. ISBN 978-3791383132. Contains a commentary on and a photograph by Wallace.
- Unseen London. London: Hoxton Mini Press, 2017. ISBN 978-1-910566-24-4. With photographs by and interviews with various photographers, and text by Rachel Segal Hamilton.
- London Nights. London: Hoxton Mini Press. 2018. ISBN 978-1-910566-34-3. With essays by Anna Sparham and poetry by Inua Ellams. Published in conjunction with an exhibition at the Museum of London.

== Awards ==
- 2015: Second Prize, Portraiture category, Sony World Photography Awards for Glasgow, Second City of The Empire.

== Exhibitions ==
- 2011: Reflections On Life, Format International Photography Festival, Derby, UK, 4 March – 8 May 2011.
- 2014: Stags, Hens & Bunnies, Hoxton Gallery, London, 24 July – 3 August 2014.
- 2015: 2015 Sony World Photography Awards Exhibition, Somerset House, London, 24 April – 10 May 2015.
- 2015: Wild Life, Fotofestiwal Lodz, Łódź, Poland, 28 May – 7 June 2015.
- 2015: Harrodsburg, The Print Space, London, 1–20 October 2015. Part of Photomonth East London Photography Festival.

== TV Appearance ==
- What Do Artists Do All Day?. Episode 26. BBC, 2016.
