= Street Photography Now =

2010 survey book of contemporary street photography

- Editor: Sophie Howarth and Stephen McLaren
- Publisher: Thames & Hudson
- Publication date: 2010
- ISBN: 978-0500289075

Street Photography Now is a survey book of contemporary street photography, edited by Sophie Howarth and Stephen McLaren and published by Thames & Hudson in 2010. It includes work by 56 photographers. Blake Andrews described the book as "the first broad street photography book to be published since Bystander in 1994". Between 2010 and 2012, a series of exhibitions were held in Europe with work from the book.

== Book content ==
Street Photography Now includes portfolios of work and biographies of Christophe Agou, Gary Alexander, Arif Aşçı, Narelle Autio, Bang Byoung-Sang, Polly Braden, Maciej Dakowicz, Carolyn Drake, Melanie Einzig, Peter Funch, Thierry Girard, Andrew Glickman, George Georgiou, David Gibson, Bruce Gilden, Siegfried Hansen, Cristóbal Hara, Markus Hartel, Nils Jorgensen, Richard Kalvar, Osamu Kanemura, Martin Kollar, Jens Olof Lasthein, Frederic Lezmi, Stephen McLaren, Jesse Marlow, Mirko Martin, Jeff Mermelstein, Joel Meyerowitz, Mimi Mollica, Trent Parke, Martin Parr, Gus Powell, Mark Alor Powell, Bruno Quinquet, Raghu Rai, Paul Russell, Boris Savelev, Otto Snoek, Matt Stuart, Ying Tang, Alexey Titarenko, Lars Tunbjörk, Nick Turpin, Jeff Wall, Munem Wasif, Alex Webb, Richard Wentworth, Amani Willett, Michael Wolf, Artem Zhitenev and Wolfgang Zurborn. It also includes four essays and a transcript of a conversation between Lezmi, Marlow, Alor Powell, Gus Powell, Russell, Tang and Turpin.

The selection of photographers seemed biased to Andrews:

. . . Street Photography Now seems intimately tied to the web. . . . The selection of photographers seems young, global, and web-savvy, with a substantial dose of HCSP, (Note: "Hardcore Street Photography", a Flickr group; it is described in Andrew Kochanowski, "Contemporary street photography: Where can I find the good stuff?," The Online Photographer, 27 November 2012.) Flickr, and In-Public members. / Meanwhile, some street stalwarts who aren't daily participants in the online world are left out, e.g., Charles Traub, Sylvia Plachy, Daido Moriyama, [Lee] Friedlander, and Henry Wessel, not to mention the patron saint of candid street photography, Elliott Erwitt. Joel Meyerowitz is included even though he hasn't been an active street shooter for 40 years.

Andrews also noted "various citation snafus", pointing to two descriptions of this as plagiarism.

== Project ==
The accompanying Street Photography Now Project was a year-long collaboration between McLaren, Howarth and The Photographers' Gallery. The project was open to the public and participants were "invited to contribute a photograph each week following a weekly instruction" by a photographer.

== Exhibitions ==
- Street Photography Now, Third Floor Gallery, Cardiff, October–November 2010, and toured to Contributed Studio for the Arts, Berlin, December 2010 – January 2011; and the Museum of Printing, Historical Museum of Warsaw, Warsaw, November 2011 – January 2012.
- Street Photography Now, shop windows throughout the Canal Saint-Martin area, part of Mois de la Photo-OFF, Paris, November 2010; Gallery Lichtblick, Cologne, 2010; and Uno Art Space, Stuttgart, April–June 2011.

== Publication details ==
- Howarth, Sophie; McLaren, Stephen, eds. (2010). Street Photography Now. London: Thames & Hudson. ISBN 978-0-500-54393-1. (Hardback)
- Howarth, Sophie; McLaren, Stephen, eds. (2010). Street Photography Now. London: Thames & Hudson. ISBN 978-0-500-28907-5. (Paperback)
- Howarth, Sophie; McLaren, Stephen, eds. (2017). Street Photography Now. Translated by Berton, Gilles. Paris: Thames & Hudson. ISBN 9780500293515. (French-language edition)
