= Nick Turpin =

British photographer (born 1969)

Nick Turpin (born 1969) is a British street photographer and advertising and design photographer. He is based in London and near Lyon, France. Turpin established the first international collective of street photographers, In-Public, in 2000 and was a member until 2018. His work has been published in his own book, On The Night Bus (2016) and in various survey publications, as well as being included in a number of group exhibitions.

== Life and work ==
Turpin was born and raised in London in 1969. He studied an art and design foundation course at the University of Gloucestershire, specialising in photography; then a BA in photography, film and video at the University of Westminster. Whilst at university he showed his second year photojournalism stories to the picture editor at The Independent and in 1990, aged 20, quit his course to be a press photographer for the newspaper. He left The Independent in 1997 for a career in advertising and design photography that would finance his street photography (for example he photographed the cover of Bridget Jones's Diary (1995) by Helen Fielding).

Turpin established the first international collective of street photographers, In-Public, in 2000 with the intention of bringing together like minded photographers to hold exhibitions, produce books and conduct workshops. Phil Coomes, writing for BBC News in 2009, considered Turpin "one of the best" street photographers. In 2010, he self-published the book 10 – 10 Years of In-Public (2010). Colin Westerbeck, writing in Time in 2011, said Turpin was "notable for having been instrumental in a collaborative documentary project", namely In-Public. He left the collective in 2018.

Turpin's short film In-Sight (2011), was commissioned for and premièred at Format International Photography Festival in Derby in 2011. In August 2017, in collaboration with Hoxton Mini Press and Jason Reed, Turpin organised Street London, a street photography symposium.

== Publications ==
=== Publications by Turpin ===
- On The Night Bus. Tales from the City Book 2. London: Hoxton Minipress, 2016. ISBN 978-1-910566-16-9. With a foreword by Will Self, "I Used to Take the Night Bus."

=== Publications with contributions by Turpin ===
- Publication #1. London: Nick Turpin Publishing, 2009. Essays by Hin Chua, David Gibson, Michael David Murphy and Turpin. Photographs by Narelle Autio, Martin Kollar, Joel Meyerowitz, Tod Papageorge, Trent Parke, Matt Stuart and Garry Winogrand. Edition of 2000 copies.
- Street Photography Now. London: Thames & Hudson, 2010. ISBN 978-0-500-54393-1 (hardback). London: Thames & Hudson, 2011. ISBN 978-0-500-28907-5 (paperback). Edited by Sophie Howarth and Stephen McLaren.
- 10 – 10 Years of In-Public. London: Nick Turpin Publishing, 2010. ISBN 978-0-9563322-1-9. Includes an essay by Jonathan Glancey, "Outlandish Harmony"; a foreword by Turpin; and a chapter each by Turpin, David Gibson, Richard Bram, Matt Stuart, Andy Morley-Hall, Trent Parke, Narelle Autio, Jesse Marlow, Adrian Fisk, Nils Jorgensen, Melanie Einzig, Jeffrey Ladd, Amani Willett, Gus Powell, Christophe Agou, Otto Snoek, Blake Andrews, David Solomons, George Kelly and Paul Russell.
- London Street Photography: 1860–2010. London: Museum of London; Stockport: Dewi Lewis, 2011. ISBN 978-1907893032. Selected from the Museum of London collection by Mike Seaborne and Anna Sparham. Published to accompany an exhibition at the Museum of London.
- Unseen London. London: Hoxton Mini Press, 2017. ISBN 978-1-910566-24-4. With photographs by and interviews with various photographers, and text by Rachel Segal Hamilton.
- London Nights. London: Hoxton Mini Press. 2018. ISBN 978-1-910566-34-3. With essays by Anna Sparham and poetry by Inua Ellams. Published in conjunction with an exhibition at the Museum of London.

== Film by Turpin ==
- In-Sight (2011). 38 minute documentary directed and edited by Turpin, commissioned by Format for the Format International Photography Festival, Derby, 2011. Includes interviews with Turpin, David Gibson, David Solomons, Richard Bram, Melanie Einzig, Gus Powell, Christophe Agou, Jesse Marlow and Otto Snoek, and shows them at work. (Note: The film is available to watch here within Turpin's site)

== Exhibitions with others ==
- Crosswalks: Contemporary Street Photography, Oklahoma City Museum of Art, Oklahoma City, OK, 24 May – 8 October 2006. With work by Turpin and 13 other photographers.
- Onto the Streets, Photofusion, London, 21 July – 16 September 2006, then toured with the British Council.
- 10 - 10 years of In-Public / In-Public @ 10, Photofusion Gallery, London. Included photographs by In-Public members Turpin, Matt Stuart, David Gibson, Richard Bram, Andy Morley-Hall, Trent Parke, Narelle Autio, Adrian Fisk, Nils Jorgensen, Jesse Marlow, Melanie Einzig, Jeffrey Ladd, Amani Willett, Gus Powell, Christophe Agou, Otto Snoek, Blake Andrews, David Solomons, George Kelly and Paul Russell.
- Street Photography Now, Third Floor Gallery, Cardiff, 10 October – 14 November 2010. Photographs from the book Street Photography Now (2011).
- Street Photography Now, shop windows throughout the Canal Saint-Martin area, part of Mois de la Photo-OFF, Paris, 5–28 November 2010; Gallery Lichtblick, Cologne, 2010; Uno Art Space, Stuttgart, 2 April – 25 June 2011. With work by Turpin as well as Autio, Maciej Dakowicz, Bruce Gilden, Thierry Girard, Markus Hartell, Jorgensen, Martin Kollar, Jens Olof Lasthein, Frederic Lezmi, Marlow, Jeff Mermelstein, Parke, Gus Powell, Snoek, Stuart, Alex Webb, and Wolgang Zurborn.
- Right Here, Right Now – Exposures From The Public Realm, Derby Museum and Art Gallery, Format International Photography Festival, Derby, UK, 4 March – 3 April 2011. Exhibition of photographs by various In-Public members, and the film In-Sight (2011).
- London Street Photography: 1860-2010, Museum of London, London, 18 February – 4 September 2011. Included work by Turpin as well as In-Public members Bram, Fisk, David Gibson, Jorgensen, Russell, Stuart, and others. Travelled to Museum of the City of New York, 27 July – 2 December 2012.
- Entente Cordial, St Pancras International railway station, London, 1–31 July 2011, included Turpin's The French with work by Jorgensen, part of The London Street Photography Festival.
- 10 - 10 years of In-Public / In-Public @ 10, with work by 20 photographers including Turpin; The French by Turpin; and In-Sight (2011), part of Les Ballades Photographiques festival, Seyssel, France, 12–23 July 2011.
- From Distant Streets: Contemporary International Street Photography, Galerie Hertz, Louisville Photo Biennial, Louisville, KY, 2 October – 12 November 2011.
- Contemporary London Street Photography, King's Cross Station, London Festival of Photography, London.
- London Nights, Museum of London, London, May–November 2018.

== Collection ==
Turpin's work is held in the following collection:

- Museum of London, London.
