= Jeffrey Ladd =

American photographer and writer

Jeffrey Ladd (born 1968) is an American photographer and writer on photography. He is a co-founder of Errata Editions.

== Life and work ==
Ladd gained a Bachelor of Fine Arts degree from the School of Visual Arts in New York City, in 1991.

He is a co-founder of the publisher Errata Editions and its Books on Books series is his concept, publishing affordable facsimile editions of rare and out of print photo books. From 2007 to 2012 he wrote the 5B4 Photography and Books blog, discussing and reviewing photography and art-related books. He was a member of the In-Public street photography collective.

Ladd's street photography was included in 10 – 10 Years of In-Public, published by Nick Turpin in 2010. His book The Awful German Language (2020) contains "lists of interesting German vocabulary words which he juxtaposes next to his black and white photographs". His book, A Field Measure Survey of America Architecture (2021), according to Kyra Ho writing in the Financial Times, contains photographs of houses from the Historic American Buildings Survey's archive of buildings of the 19th- and 20th-century United States, following the Mason–Dixon line, "to create a documentary-style architectural portrait".

Since 2011 he has lived in Cologne, Germany.

== Publications ==
=== Books by Ladd ===
- The Awful German Language. Leipzig: Spector, 2020. ISBN 978-3959053440.
- A Field Measure Survey of America Architecture. London: Mack, 2021. ISBN 978-1913620417.

=== Books with contributions by Ladd ===
- 10 – 10 Years of In-Public. London: Nick Turpin, 2010. ISBN 978-0-9563322-1-9. Includes an essay by Jonathan Glancey, "Outlandish Harmony"; a foreword by Nick Turpin; and a chapter each by Ladd and various other In-Public members.

== Collections ==
Ladd's work is held in the following permanent collection:

- Brooklyn Museum, Brooklyn, New York: 5 prints (as of May 3, 2023)
