= In-Public =

International group of street photographers

iN-PUBLiC
- Type: Collective
- Industry: Street photography, Photography
- Founded: 2000
- Founder: Nick Turpin
- Area served: Worldwide
- Website: in-public.com

In-Public (sometimes written iN-PUBLiC) is an international group of street photographers that operates as a collective photo agency. It was established in 2000 by Nick Turpin with the intention of bringing together like minded photographers to hold exhibitions, produce books and conduct workshops and promote street photography.

It was the first international collective of street photographers, its geographically disparate membership facilitated by the Internet. New members were accepted but the recruitment process was "haphazard and organic".

It ended in 2018 but was relaunched in 2020.

== History ==
In-Public was established in 2000 by Nick Turpin. Turpin left the collective in 2018. Its website stated that the collective ended in October 2018 because of a division between its members over the posting by two of them of a computational image and a staged image. Many of the old members formed a new group, UP Photographers.

In April 2020 In-Public's website stated that the group had relaunched, "with a new remit to promote and celebrate photographers who eschew staging and manipulation". The new group included a few from its previous membership, including Turpin.

== Notable members ==
=== Masters ===
- Christophe Agou (joined in 2005, died in 2015)
- Richard Kalvar (joined in 2007)
- Saul Leiter (joined in 2013)
- Vivian Maier (adopted in 2016)
- Joel Meyerowitz (joined in 2006)

=== Members of first incarnation (2000–2018) ===
- Blake Andrews (joined in 2006)
- Narelle Autio (joined in 2001)
- Richard Bram (joined in 2001)
- Maciej Dakowicz (joined in 2013)
- Melanie Einzig (joined in 2002)
- David Gibson (joined in 2000)
- Siegfried Hansen (joined in 2014)
- Jesse Marlow (joined in 2001)
- Igor Mukhin (joined in 2018)
- Shin Noguchi (joined in 2018)
- Trent Parke (joined in 2001)
- Gus Powell (joined in 2003)
- Mark Powell (joined in 2011)
- Paul Russell (joined in 2010)
- David Solomons (joined in 2008)
- Matt Stuart (joined in 2001)

== Publications ==
=== Publications by In-Public ===
- 10 – 10 Years of In-Public. London: Nick Turpin, 2010. ISBN 978-0-9563322-1-9. Includes an essay by Jonathan Glancey, "Outlandish Harmony"; a foreword by Nick Turpin; and a chapter each by Turpin, Gibson, Bram, Stuart, Morley-Hall, Parke, Autio, Marlow, Fisk, Jorgensen, Melanie Einzig, Ladd, Willett, Gus Powell, Agou, Snoek, Andrews, Solomons, Kelly and Russell.

=== Publications with significant contributions by multiple In-Public members ===
- Threee. London: Self-published / Hat-Trick Design, 2003. Photographs by Turpin, Gibson and Stuart.
- Street Photography Now. London: Thames & Hudson, 2010. ISBN 978-0-500-54393-1. Edited by Sophie Howarth and Stephen McLaren. Includes work by Agou, Autio, Dakowicz, Einzig, Gibson, Hansen, Jorgensen, Marlow, Parke, Gus Powell, Mark Powell, Russell, Snoek, Stuart, Turpin and Willett, and others.
- London Street Photography: 1860–2010. London: Museum of London; Stockport: Dewi Lewis, 2011. ISBN 978-1907893032. Selected from the Museum of London collection by Mike Seaborne and Anna Sparham. Includes work from Bram, Fisk, Gibson, Jorgensen, Russell, Solomons, Stuart and Turpin, and others. Published to accompany an exhibition at the Museum of London.
- The Street Photographer's Manual. London: Thames & Hudson, 2014. ISBN 978-0-500-29130-6. By David Gibson. Includes profiles on Stuart, Andrews, Jorgensen, Parke, Marlow, Solomons, Shin and Autio; also includes contributions from Russell, Turpin, Bram, Morley-Hall and Gus Powell, and others.
- 100 Great Street Photographs. Munich, London, New York: Prestel, 2017. By David Gibson. Includes a commentary on a photograph by each of Agou, Bram, Dakowicz, Hansen, Jorgensen, Kelly, Kool, Kydonakis, Marlow, Noguchi, Parke, Mark Powell, Russell, and Tavepong, as well as others. ISBN 978-3791383132.

== Film ==
- In-Sight (2011). 38 minute documentary directed and edited by Nick Turpin, commissioned by Format for Format International Photography Festival, Derby, 2011. Includes interviews with Turpin, Gibson, Solomons, Bram, Einzig, Powell, Agou, Marlow and Snoek, and shows them at work. (Note: There is a trailer for the film, and access to the full film can be bought, here at Distrify)

== Exhibitions ==
- In-Public.com: Street Photography, Acute Angle Gallery, Bankside, London, June / July 2002. Included the work of seven members of In-Public.
- in-public @ 10, Photofusion, Brixton, London, May– July 2010. Travelled to Les Ballades Photographiques de Seyssel, Seyssel, France, July 2011, where it also included the film In-Sight (2011) and The French exhibition by Turpin. Photographs by In-Public members Turpin, Gibson, Bram, Stuart, Morley-Hall, Parke, Autio, Fisk, Jorgensen, Marlow, Einzig, Ladd, Willett, Gus Powell, Agou, Snoek, Andrews, Solomons, Kelly and Russell.
- London Street Photography: 1860–2010, Museum of London, London, February–September 2011. Travelled to Museum of the City of New York, New York, July–December 2012. Included photographs by In-Public members Bram, Fisk, Gibson, Jorgensen, Russell, Solomons, Stuart and Turpin, and others.
- Derby Museum and Art Gallery, Format International Photography Festival, Derby, UK, March– April 2011. Exhibition of photographs by In-Public members Agou, Andrews, Autio, Bram, Einzig, Fisk, Gibson, Jorgensen, Kelly, Ladd, Morley-Hall, Marlow, Parke, Gus Powell, Turpin, Russell, Snoek, Solomons, Stuart, Willett, and the film In-Sight (2011), commissioned for the festival.
- From Distant Streets: Contemporary International Street Photography, Galerie Hertz, Louisville, KY, October–November 2011. Part of Louisville Photo Biennial. Curated by Richard Bram. Included 14 In-Public members, of the 29 photographers included.
- iN-PUBLiC: An Exhibition of Street Photography, Thailand Creative and Design Centre, Bangkok, Thailand, February–March 2013. In conjunction with the British Council. Photographs by In-Public members Agou, Andrews, Autio, Bram, Einzig, Fisk, Gibson, Jorgensen, Kelly, Ladd, Morley-Hall, Marlow, Parke, Gus Powell, Turpin, Russell, Snoek, Solomons, Stuart, and Willett.
- In Public, Snickarbacken 7, Stockholm, Sweden, May–June 2013. An augmented version of their in-public @ 10 exhibition alongside an exhibition of five Stockholm street photographers organised by Contemporary Urban Photography (CUP). Photographs by In-Public members Agou, Andrews, Autio, Bram, Einzig, Fisk, Gibson, Jorgensen, Kelly, Ladd, Morley-Hall, Marlow, Parke, Gus Powell, Turpin, Russell, Snoek, Solomons, Stuart, and Willett.
- Miami Street Photography Festival, Miami, FL, December 2013. In-Public group exhibition along with other collectives STRATA and CALLE 35, and showing of the film In-Sight (2011).
- Night of Collectives, Street Parade festival, Paris, 18 November 2014. Also with Strange.rs and Burn My Eye street photography collectives.
- The Sharp Eye. In-Public in Mexico, Foto Mexico, Cine Tonalá, Mexico City, Mexico, October–November 2015. Slideshow of photographs by Agou, Andrews, Bram, Dakowicz, Einzig, Fisk, Gibson, Gross, Hansen, Jorgensen, Kelly, Marlow, Morley-Hall, Parke, Gus Powell, Mark Powell, Russell, Snoek, Solomons, Stuart, Turpin, and Amani Willett. Curated by Mark Powell, Carlos Álvarez Montero and Alfredo Esparza.

== Collections ==
The following public collection holds work by In-Public as a group:

- Museum of London, London. Holds the work included in the exhibition London Street Photography: 1860–2010, by Bram, Fisk, Gibson, Jorgensen, Russell, Solomons, Stuart and Turpin.
