= Matt Stuart (photographer) =

British street photographer

Matt Stuart (1974) is a British street photographer. He was a member of the In-Public street photography collective. Stuart also works as an advertising photographer.

His books of street photography include All That Life Can Afford (2016) and Into the Fire (2020). His work has also been exhibited in solo exhibitions in Britain and the USA. Of note, his work also appeared in group exhibitions at the Museum of London (which acquired his work for its permanent collection), the Museum of the City of New York, France, Bangkok and Stockholm.

== Life and work ==
Stuart was born in Harrow, north west London, in 1974. In interviews he has described his life as having been spent singularly and obsessively devoted to one interest after another, including skateboarding from 1986 to 1994, and kung fu, before taking up photography working as an assistant to a photographer for three years. From that experience, he turned professional by working for himself from 2000 onward. His personal street photography is his main focus, predominantly in London—his book All That Life Can Afford (2016) includes photographs made there between 2002 and 2015. He also works commercially as an advertising photographer, and leads street photography workshops. Stuart became a member of the In-Public street photography collective in 2001 and in 2016 was a nominee member of Magnum Photos.

== Publications ==
=== Publications by Stuart ===
- All That Life Can Afford. London: Plague, 2016. ISBN 978-0-9935090-0-1. (Note: The ISBN was erroneously published as 978-0-9935090 in the first edition.) With an essay by Geoff Dyer, "Why does he do this every day?". First edition of 1000 copies and 100 limited editions; second printing, edition of 1000 copies and 100 limited editions.
- Into the Fire. Richmond, UK: Setanta, 2020. Edition of 1000 copies.
- All That Life Can Afford. Second edition, re-designed and with a new sequence of images. London: Plague, 2020. With an essay by Dyer. Edition of 1000 copies.
- Think Like a Street Photographer. London: Laurence King, 2021. ISBN 978-1786277282. With text by Gemma Padley and a foreword by Derren Brown.

=== Publications co-edited by Stuart ===
- Reclaim the Street: Street Photography's Moment. London: Thames & Hudson, 2023. With Stephen McLaren. ISBN 9780500545379.

=== Publications with contributions by Stuart ===
- Publication #1. London: Nick Turpin Publishing, 2009. Essays by Hin Chua, David Gibson, Michael David Murphy and Nick Turpin. Photographs by Stuart, Narelle Autio, Martin Kollar, Joel Meyerowitz, Tod Papageorge, Trent Parke and Garry Winogrand. Edition of 2000 copies.
- Photography in 100 Words: Exploring the Art of Photography with Fifty of its Greatest Masters. By David Clark. London: Argentum, 2009. ISBN 978-1902538570.
- 10 – 10 Years of In-Public. London: Nick Turpin, 2010. ISBN 978-0-9563322-1-9. Includes an essay by Jonathan Glancey, "Outlandish Harmony"; a foreword by Turpin; and a chapter each by Stuart and other In-Public photographers.
- Street Photography Now. London: Thames & Hudson, 2010. ISBN 978-0-500-54393-1 (hardback). London: Thames & Hudson, 2011. ISBN 978-0-500-28907-5 (paperback). Edited by Sophie Howarth and Stephen McLaren.
- London Street Photography: 1860–2010. London: Museum of London; Stockport: Dewi Lewis, 2011. ISBN 978-1907893032. Selected from the Museum of London collection by Mike Seaborne and Anna Sparham. Published to accompany an exhibition at the Museum of London.
- The World Atlas of Street Photography. New Haven and London: Yale University Press: 2014, ISBN 978-0-300-20716-3. Edited by Jackie Higgins. With a foreword by Max Kozloff.
- The Street Photographer's Manual. London: Thames & Hudson, 2014. ISBN 978-0-500-29130-6. By David Gibson. Includes a profile of Stuart.
- Failed it!: How to turn mistakes into ideas and other advice for successfully screwing up. London: Phaidon, 2016. By Erik Kessels. ISBN 978-0714871196.
- Unseen London. London: Hoxton Mini Press, 2017. ISBN 978-1-910566-24-4. With photographs by and interviews with various photographers, and text by Rachel Segal Hamilton.

== Exhibitions ==
=== Solo exhibitions ===
- On The Way, main post office, Helsinki, Finland, October–November 2004.
- KK Outlet, London, February 2010.
- Look Both Ways, Leica Gallery San Francisco, February–April 2015; Leica Store Washington DC, May–? 2015;

=== Exhibitions with others or during festivals ===
- Onto the Streets, Photofusion, London, 2006, then toured with the British Council. Curated by Stephen McLaren and Sophie Howarth.
- in-public @ 10, Photofusion, Brixton, London, 2010. (Note: The Photofusion website claims it showed the exhibition in 2012 but it actually did so in 2010.) Travelled to Les Ballades Photographiques de Seyssel, Seyssel, France, 2011; Included photographs by In-Public members.
- Street Photography Now, Third Floor Gallery, Cardiff, 2010. Photographs from the book Street Photography Now (2011).
- Street Photography Now, shop windows throughout the Canal Saint-Martin area, part of Mois de la Photo-OFF, Paris, 2010. Gallery Lichtblick, Cologne, 2010; Uno Art Space, Stuttgart, 2011.
- Derby Museum and Art Gallery, Format International Photography Festival, Derby, UK, 2011. Exhibition of photographs by In-Public members and the film In-Sight (2011).
- London Street Photography: 1860-2010, Museum of London, London, 2011. Travelled to the Museum of the City of New York, 2012.
- iN-PUBLiC: An Exhibition of Street Photography, Thailand Creative and Design Centre, Bangkok, Thailand, 2013. In conjunction with the British Council. Photographs by In-Public members.
- In Public, Snickerbacken 7, Stockholm, Sweden, 2013. Photographs by In-Public members.
- Pedestrians, Photomonth festival, Leica Mayfair, London, 2015.
- The Magic Lantern Show, Deadhouse, Somerset House, London, during Photo London, 2016. Exhibition of prints by Stuart accompanied by projections of work by Marina Sersale, Bredun Edwards and The Lurkers.

== Awards ==
- 2005: One of Photo District News's "PDN 30 2005: New and Emerging Photographers to Watch"

== Collections ==
Stuart's work is held in the following public collection:

- Museum of London, London.
