= Paul Russell (photographer) =

British street photographer

Paul Russell (born 1966) is a British street photographer, based in Weymouth, Dorset. He was a member of the In-Public international street photography collective. Russell's work has been published in his own publications, the book Eastleigh By-election 2013 and the zines On Weymouth Beach and Country Show, and in a few survey publications on street photography. His work is held in the collection of the Museum of London and he has had solo exhibitions in venues around the UK, and in group exhibitions in various locations worldwide.

== Life and work ==
Russell was born in London in 1966. He is based in Weymouth, Dorset. He became a member of the In-Public international street photography collective in 2010.

Phil Coomes, writing for BBC News in 2011, described him as "street photographer Paul Russell whose eye for a humorous moment is as keen as any you will find."

== Publications ==
=== Publications by Russell ===
- Eastleigh By-election 2013: My Week in Politics. Weymouth: Self-published, 2013.
- On Weymouth Beach. London: Bump, 2020. Edited by David Solomons. Edition of 200 copies. A zine.
- Country Show. London: Bump, 2020. Edited by Solomons. Edition of 200 copies. A zine.
- Aquae Sulis. London: Bump, 2021. Edited by Solomons. Edition of 200 copies. A zine.
- Bournemouth. London: Bump, 2021. Edited by Solomons. Edition of 200 copies. A zine.

=== Publications with contributions by Russell ===
- 10 – 10 Years of In-Public. London: Nick Turpin Publishing, 2010. ISBN 978-0-9563322-1-9. Includes an essay by Jonathan Glancey, "Outlandish Harmony"; a foreword by Nick Turpin; and a chapter each by Russell and various other In-Public members.
- Street Photography Now. London: Thames & Hudson, 2010. ISBN 978-0-500-54393-1 (hardback). London: Thames & Hudson, 2011. ISBN 978-0-500-28907-5 (paperback). Edited by Sophie Howarth and Stephen McLaren.
- London Street Photography: 1860–2010. London: Museum of London; Stockport: Dewi Lewis, 2011. ISBN 978-1907893032. Selected from the Museum of London collection by Mike Seaborne and Anna Sparham. Published to accompany an exhibition at the Museum.
- The Street Photographer's Manual. London: Thames & Hudson, 2014. By David Gibson. ISBN 978-0-500-29130-6.
- 100 Great Street Photographs. Munich, London, New York: Prestel, 2017. By David Gibson. ISBN 978-3791383132. Contains a commentary on and a photograph by Russell.

== Exhibitions ==
=== Solo exhibitions ===
- Beside the Sea, Gallery 435, Slough, England, September–October 2006; then toured to South Hill Park Arts Centre, Bracknell, England, February–March 2007; and Clotworthy Arts Centre, Antrim, Northern Ireland, September 2007.
- London Tourist's Guide and Beside the Sea, Housmans Bookshop, King's Cross, London, July–September 2010.
- Stand Up!, Bank Street Arts, Sheffield, England, October 2010. One of a series of Stand Up! exhibitions running alongside Grin Up North – The Sheffield Comedy Festival.

=== Group exhibitions ===
- in-public @ 10, Photofusion, Brixton, London, May–July 2010. (Note: The Photofusion website claims it showed the exhibition in 2012 but it actually did so in 2010.) Travelled to Les Ballades Photographiques de Seyssel, Seyssel, France, July 2011; Photographs by various In-Public members.
- Street Photography Now, Third Floor Gallery, Cardiff, October–November 2010, and toured to Contributed Studio for the Arts, Berlin, December 2010 – January 2011; Museum of Printing, Historical Museum of Warsaw, Warsaw, November 2011 – January 2012; Poortersloge, part of Brugge Foto 13 festival, Bruge, Belgium, December 2013 – January 2014. Photographs from the book Street Photography Now (2011).
- Right Here, Right Now – Exposures From The Public Realm, Derby Museum and Art Gallery, Format International Photography Festival, Derby, UK, March–April 2011. Exhibition of photographs by various In-Public members and the film In-Sight (2011).
- London Street Photography: 1860-2010, Museum of London, London, 18 February – 4 September 2011. Included work by various In-Public members and others. Travelled to the Museum of the City of New York, 27 July – 2 December 2012.
- Landscape and Industry, Lighthouse Arts Centre, Poole, UK, April–September 2011. Russel with Joe Stevens and local photography club the Happy Snappers.
- International Photography Festival No.2, Tel Aviv, Israel, October 2012. In-Public group exhibition.
- iN-PUBLiC: An Exhibition of Street Photography, Thailand Creative and Design Centre, Bangkok, Thailand, February–March 2013. In conjunction with the British Council. Photographs by various In-Public members.
- In Public, Snickarbacken 7, Stockholm, Sweden, May–June 2013. Photographs by various In-Public members.
- Miami Street Photography Festival, Miami, FL, December 2013. In-Public group exhibition along with other collectives STRATA and CALLE 35.
- 2015: The Sharp Eye. In-Public in Mexico, Foto Mexico, Cine Tonalá, Mexico City, Mexico, October–November 2015. Slideshow of photographs by various In-Public members. Curated by Mark Powell, Carlos Álvarez Montero and Alfredo Esparza.

== Collections ==
Russell's work is held in the following permanent collection:

- Museum of London, London.
