= Richard Bram =

American street photographer

Richard Bram (born 1952) is an American street photographer. He is based in London and was a member of the In-Public street photography collective.

Bram has published two books of candid public photographs: Street Photography (2006), a compact collection of black and white photographs taken around the world from 1988 to 2005; and New York (2016), "like a greatest-hits album" of work made between 2005 and 2015 whilst living in New York City.

His work has been shown in group exhibitions at the Museum of London, Museum of the City of New York, and Derby Museum and Art Gallery as part of Format International Photography Festival. It is held in the permanent collections of the Bibliothèque nationale de France in Paris, George Eastman Museum in Rochester, New York, and the Museum of London.

== Life and work ==
Bram was born in Philadelphia, Pennsylvania, USA in 1952. He attended Arizona State University in Tempe, Arizona, where he received a B.Sc. in political science. He worked in business and then later became a professional photographer.

Bram lived in Louisville, Kentucky, moving to London in 1997, then New York City in 2008, and back to London around 2016–2017.

He became a member of the In-Public street photography collective in 2001.

== Publications ==
=== Books of work by Bram ===
- Street Photography. Mannheim, Germany: Galerie Kasten, 2006. Edited and with a foreword by Friedrich W. Kasten.
- New York. New York City: Peanut, 2016. ISBN 978-0-9977219-8-0. Edited by David Carol and with a foreword by Stephen McLaren. Edition of 1000 copies.

=== Zines of work by Bram ===
- The Red Cube. London: Bump, 2021. Edited by David Solomons. Edition of 200 copies.

=== Books with contributions by Bram ===
- Publication #1. London: Nick Turpin, 2009. With essays by Hin Chua, David Gibson, Michael David Murphy and Turpin. Edition of 2000 copies.
- 10 – 10 Years of In-Public. London: Nick Turpin, 2010. ISBN 978-0-9563322-1-9. With an essay by Jonathan Glancey, "Outlandish Harmony"; a foreword by Turpin; and a chapter each by Bram and others.
- London Street Photography: 1860–2010. London: Museum of London; Stockport: Dewi Lewis, 2011. ISBN 978-1907893032. Selected from the Museum of London collection by Mike Seaborne and Anna Sparham. With a foreword by Jack Lohman and an introduction by Seaborne. Published to accompany an exhibition at the Museum.

== Exhibitions ==
=== Group exhibitions ===
- in-public @ 10, Photofusion, Brixton, London, May–July 2010; Les Ballades Photographiques de Seyssel, Seyssel, France, July 2011, where it also included the film In-Sight (2011). Photographs by various In-Public members.
- London Street Photography: 1860–2010, Museum of London, London, February–September 2011; Museum of the City of New York, New York City, July–December 2012.
- Derby Museum and Art Gallery, Format International Photography Festival, Derby, UK, March–April 2011. Photographs by various In-Public members, and the film In-Sight (2011), commissioned for the festival.
- iN-PUBLiC: An Exhibition of Street Photography, Thailand Creative and Design Centre, Bangkok, Thailand, February–March 2013. In conjunction with the British Council. Photographs by various In-Public members.

=== Exhibitions curated by Bram ===
- From Distant Streets: Contemporary International Street Photography, Galerie Hertz, Louisville, KY, October–November 2011. Part of Louisville Photo Biennial. Included work by 29 photographers, including 14 In-Public members.

== Film ==
- In-Sight (2011). 38 minute documentary directed and edited by Nick Turpin, commissioned by Format for the Format International Photography Festival, Derby, 2011. Includes an interview with Bram and shows him at work. (Note: The film is available to watch here within Turpin's site.)

== Collections ==
Bram's work is held in the following permanent collections:

- Bibliothèque nationale de France (National Library of France), Paris
- George Eastman Museum, Rochester, New York: 3 prints
- Museum of London, London: 1 print
