= Alexander Chekmenev =

Ukrainian photographer

Alexander Chekmenev (Oleksandr Chekmenov)
- Олександр Володимирович Чекменьов
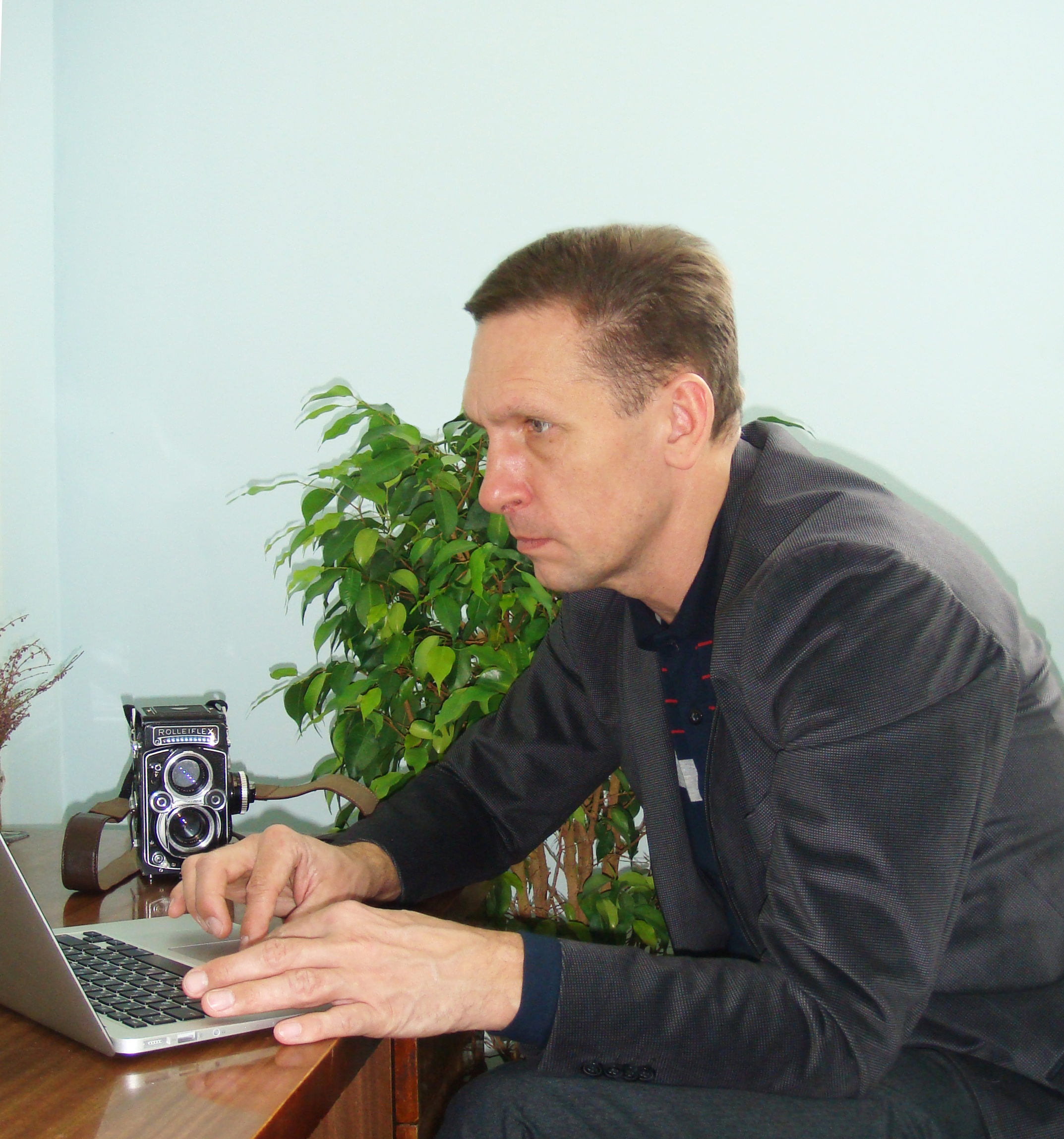
- Born: April 1, 1969 (age 57); Luhansk, Ukraine
- Occupations: Documentary photographer and photojournalist
- Years active: 1988–present
- Website: www.alexanderchekmenev.com

Alexander Chekmenev (Oleksandr Chekmenov) (Ukrainian: Олександр Володимирович Чекменьов, Russian: Александр Владимирович Чекменёв, born April 1, 1969) is a Ukrainian documentary photographer and photojournalist based in Kyiv.

== Career ==
Chekmenev made his first photo while in school, attended a photoclub and later got a professional certificate from a licensed photo studio in Luhansk in 1988.

He worked for a studio in Luhansk and did small time jobs taking pictures of weddings, birthdays and other occasions. He also occasionally volunteered as a forensic photographer for an ambulance brigade in the city.

In 1997 he was invited to a Kiyv-based daily newspaper as a photojournalist and moved to Kyiv. In 1998 the newspaper ceased operation, Chekmenev became a freelancer and has been working as an independent photojournalist ever since. Today he works as a photojournalist

His first book was called simply Black and White Photographs and was published in 2008 in Kyiv, as a part of series on Ukrainian photography. In 2011 Alexander made a private print of his book Donbass in Germany. Chekmenev created a series of portraits of protestors, called Warriors, as they emerged from the street battles of Euromaidan. His next book Passport was based on his work of 1994/95 and was published in the UK in 2017.

== Publications ==
=== Publications by Chekmenev ===
- Black and White Photographs. Kyiv: Artbook, 2008. ISBN 978-966-96916-4-4. Ukrainian/English. Edition of 1000 copies.
- Donbass. Heidelberg: Kehrer, 2011. Edited by Andrej Krementschouk. ISBN 978-3-86828-185-9. German/English/Russian.
- Passport. Stockport: Dewi Lewis, 2017. ISBN 978-1-911306-06-1. Edition of 1000 copies.
- Lilies. Museum of Kharkiv School of Photography, 2020. Photography and text by Chekmenev. Edited by Sergiy Lebedynskyy. ISBN 978-3-947922-04-8. Ukrainian/English. Edition of 550 copies.
- Pharmakon: Ambulance in Luhansk 1994–1995. Palermo: 89books, 2021. ISBN 978-88-944092-8-4. With an essay by Donald Weber.

=== Publications with others ===
- Insight. Ukrainian black and white photography in the XXI century. 2008.

== Collections ==
- Museum of Kharkiv School of Photography, Kharkiv, Ukraine (245 prints from various series)
- Museum Ludwig, Cologne, Germany (15 prints from the Passport series)
- Mystetskyi Arsenal National Art and Culture Museum Complex, Kyiv, Ukraine (prints from the Passport series)
- Märkisches Museum, Witten, Germany (2 prints from the Donbass series)

== Solo exhibitions ==
- Ukrainian Passport, Lilac series, City art gallery in Poprad, Slovakia, 2000
- Ukrainian Passport, Lilac, The Blind, Easter, Portraits, The Miners, City art gallery in Olsztyn, Poland, 2001
- Donbass, Perm Museum of Contemporary Art, Perm, Russia, 2010
- Donbass, Märkisches Museum (Witten), Witten, Germany, 2013
- Donbass, Pálffy Palace, Bratislava, Slovakia, 2015
- Donbass, Passport, Blue Sky Gallery, Portland, OR, 2016
- Donbass, Märkisches Museum, Witten, Germany, 2018

== See also ==
- Serhii Korovayny
