= Shin Noguchi =

Japanese photographer (born 1976)

Shin Noguchi (born 1976) is a Japanese street photographer, based in Kamakura and Tokyo. His work has been included in two books on street photography and he was 1st Prize Winner at Festival de Photo MAP Toulouse 2014.

== Life and work ==
Noguchi was born in 1976 in Shinjuku, Tokyo, Japan, and he has lived in Kamakura for 20 years.

He has been featured on The Leica Camera Blog, in Courrier International, Internazionale, Libération, Tages-Anzeiger, The Independent, and The Guardian. Some assignment work has also been published in Die Zeit, Die Zeit Wissen, and Libération.

== Awards ==
- 2012: Finalist, Invisible Photographer Asia Awards 2012
- 2013: Finalist, Invisible Photographer Asia Awards 2013
- 2014: 1st Prize Winner, Prix Talents Festival de Photo MAP Toulouse 2014
- 2016: 4th Prize, "National Awards, Japan" category, 2016 Sony World Photography Awards, World Photography Organisation
- 2018: Finalist, Invisible Photographer Asia Awards 2018

== Exhibitions ==
=== Solo exhibitions ===
- 2014: Something Here, MAP Toulouse 2014, France
- 2016: Something Here, Space Place Gallery, Nizhny Tagil, Russia

=== Group exhibitions ===
- 2016: Simply, Center for Fine Art Photography, Fort Collins, CO, USA
- 2016: Sony World Photography Awards 2016 Exhibition, World Photography Organisation, Ginza Place, Ginza, Tokyo
- 2017: Photography on a Postcard, ThePrintSpace, Shoreditch, London
- 2019: Leica Street Photography Festival Exhibition, produced by Leica Camera China, Shanghai, China
- 2019: 12th International Architecture Biennale of São Paulo, São Paulo, Brazil

== Publications ==
=== Publications by Noguchi ===
- Hawaii. Self-published, Blurb, 2017.
- In Color In Japan. Eyeshot, 2020.

=== Publications with contributions by Noguchi ===
- The Street Photographer's Manual. By David Gibson. Thames & Hudson, 2014. ISBN 978-0-500-29130-6.
- 100 Great Street Photographs. By David Gibson. Prestel, 2017. ISBN 978-3791383132.
