= Erin Trieb =

American photographer

Erin Grace Trieb is an American photojournalist. Trieb focuses on international social issues and is currently based in Istanbul, Turkey.

== Early life and career ==
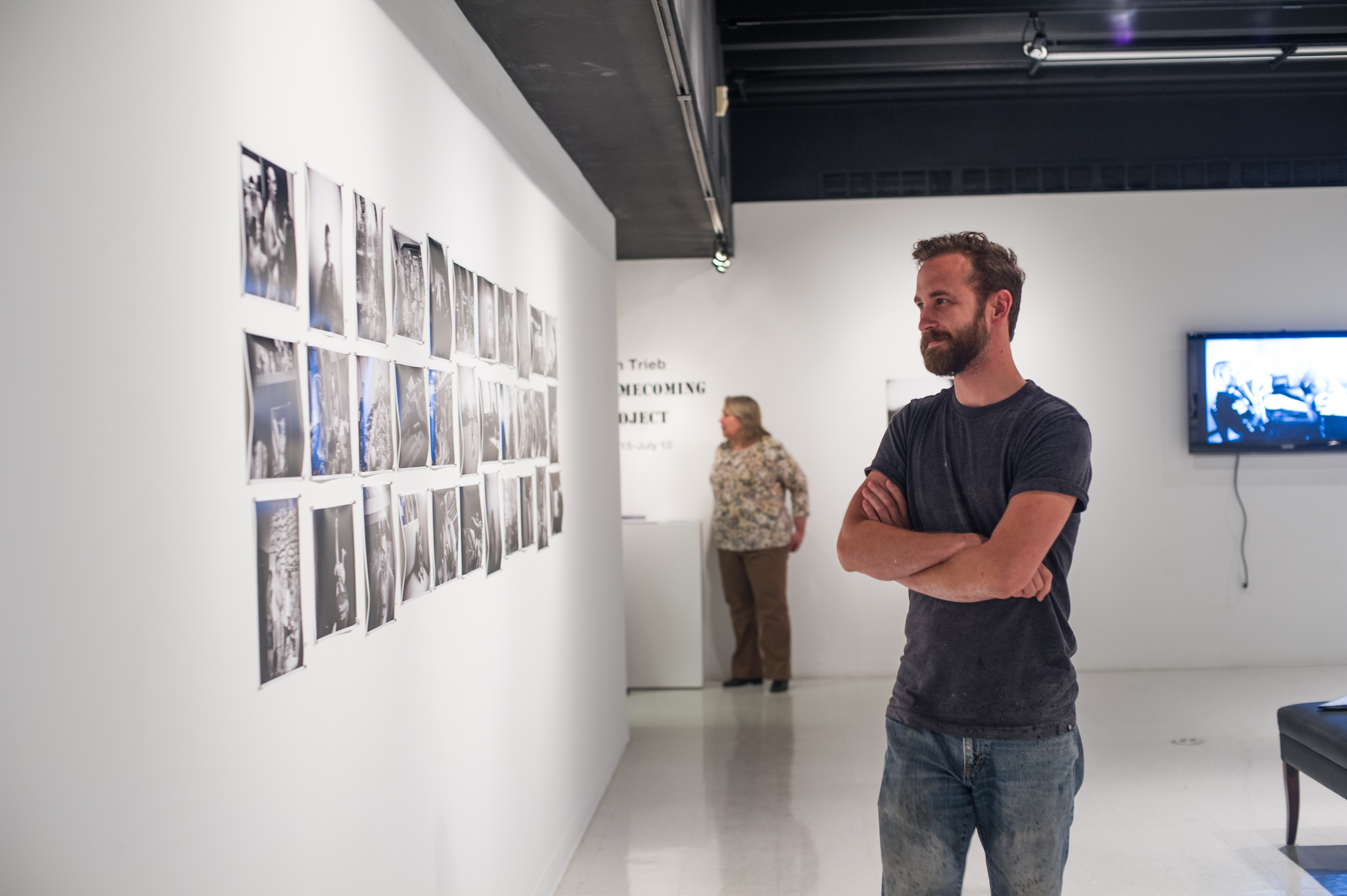
Battle Company and The War At Home exhibition at Texas A&M University–Commerce, Commerce, Texas, 2015

Trieb was born on July 1, 1982, in Dallas, Texas. Her parents are Michele Pegues and Mark Alan Trieb. She received a bachelor of arts degree from Texas A&M University-Commerce.

Trieb started her career in photography in Israel and Palestine in 2004. In 2005 she worked as a part time newspaper correspondent for the Houston Chronicle and The Dallas Morning News.

== Professional photojournalism ==
Trieb began her career as a professional photojournalist in 2007. She has worked for numerous magazines and newspapers. She has worked all over the world but is focused on the Middle East and the United States. Some countries Trieb has visited for her photojournalism include Israel, Syria, Palestine, Iraq, Bosnia, and Turkey. Director of Photography at NBC News James Collins described Trieb as "a visually creative person but also as a solid journalist." The work of photographs and visual news like Trieb's is starting to change the way certain cultures look at their identity.

== Projects and notable photographs ==
=== Women's Protection Units (YPJ) ===
Trieb spent six days photographing an all female branch of the Kurdish military, the Women's Protection Units (YPJ). She photographed their daily lives as well as combat situations, and the refugees they protect.

=== The Homecoming Project ===
One of Trieb's biggest projects is The Homecoming Project. It was designed to draw attention Post Traumatic Stress Disorder and begin a dialogue about how to help soldiers who struggle with it. Trieb followed members of the United States Army's tenth mountain division in Afghanistan. She notes that the hardest part of this project was not the shootouts, the landmines, or the fact that she was the only woman in sight (a commonality that is starting to be brought to the surface), it was seeing the effect war has on these people. Trieb recounts that most of the soldiers had some psychological problems. The Homecoming Project started a conversation about how to deal with the mental health problems soldiers face. This work has been shown all around the world. Trieb's website describes the Homecoming project displaying "the trauma, loss, courage, and struggle so many service members experience after exiting the battlefield."

=== Girls basketball in Iraq ===
Trieb photographed a women's basketball team in Iraqi Kurdistan shortly after the 2014 ISIS conflict between the two. During this time, women's sports were not widely accepted in the area. Trieb photographed the story of women trying to change the way their country sees them.

== Women's issues ==
Roughly 10% of those involved in photojournalism are women. Trieb is part of Women Photograph, an organization that highlights women photographers and photojournalists worldwide and works to reduce the large gender gap in the industry. She was a featured "icon" in Outside magazine's special adventurous women issue. Trieb is an avid advocate for gender and ethnicity diversification in photojournalism, saying "Minorities, especially women and people of color, have a unique perspective and voice that needs to be seen and heard. And it is partly up to our industry’s willingness and invested effort in order for serious changes to be made in that regard."

== Awards and Grants ==
- 2005: Women in Photojournalism, Scholarship Recipient
- 2007: AI-AP Award, selected work for annual awards book
- 2007: Pictures of the Year International (POYi) Award, Magazine News Picture Story, Kinky Friedman for Governor, 2nd Place
- 2007: World Press Photo Award Portrait story, Kinky Friedman for Governor, 3rd Place
- 2009: Rory Peck Trust Scholarship Recipient
- 2010: AI-AP Award, selected work for annual awards book
- 2010: Pictures of the Year International Award, General New Reporting, Afghanistan: Behind the Frontline, Award of Excellence
- 2011: Selected, Art Director's Club Young Guns 9 Competition For Creatives 30 and Under
- 2012: FotoVisura Grant Recipient
- 2014: Alumni Ambassador Award, Texas A&M University-Commerce
- 2015: International Photography Of The Year, Documentary, 3rd Place, We Are The YPJ
- 2015: Photoville's The Fence, Selected work and exhibition, We Are The YPJ
- 2015: Magenta Foundation Flash Forward Emerging Photographer Award
- 2015: AI-AP Award, selected work for annual awards book
- 2016: AI-AP Award, selected work for annual awards book
- 2016: Head On Photo Festival Portrait Prize

== Exhibitions ==
- 2007: In Focus: Texas Documentary Photographers, The Majestic Ranch Arts Foundation, Boerne, Texas
- 2007: Kinky Friedman For Texas Governor, Projection, at Visa Pour L’Image Festival, Perpignan, France
- 2007: 64th Pictures of the Year International Traveling Exhibition, Exhibited worldwide
- 2007: World Press Photo Awards Traveling Exhibition, Exhibited worldwide
- 2008: Kinky Friedman For Texas Governor, Projection, Slideluck Potshow, Shangrila, Austin, Texas
- 2009: Afghanistan: Behind The Frontlines, Exhibition, Forward Operating Base Shank, Logar Province, Afghanistan
- 2009: Afghanistan: Behind The Frontlines, Projection, Slideluck Potshow, Shangrila, Austin, Texas
- 2010: Afghanistan: Behind The Frontlines, Projection at Pecha Kucha, Austin, Texas
- 2011: Portraits of Soldiers in Kandahar, Projection Installation, Operation Warrior Wellness Conference hosted by Donna Karen and The David Lynch Foundation, Urban Zen Center, New York City
- 2011: Art Director's Club Young Guns 9 Winners Exhibition, sponsored by Corbis, ADC Gallery, New York City
- 2011: The Homecoming, Projection at LOOK3 Photography Festival, curated by Scott Thode, Charlottesville, Virginia
- 2011: 29th Annual Juried Membership Exhibition, Houston Center For Photography, Houston, Texas
- 2011: The Homecoming, Projection at Bursa International Photofest, Bursa, Turkey
- 2012: iSee Exhibition, VII Group Show, Griffin Museum of Photography by Digital Silver Imaging, Belmont, Massachusetts
- 2012: Battle Company, Our Voices Exhibition, hosted by Rose Charities, Milk Gallery, New York City
- 2012: The Homecoming Project, Projection in partnership with The Austin Symphony Orchestra at The Long Center For The Performing Arts, curated by Scott Thode, The Long Center Campus, Austin, Texas
- 2012: FotoVisura Exhibition, Curated by FotoVisura, United Photo Industries Gallery, Dumbo, New York
- 2012: Women in Photography, Projection of work from The Homecoming Project, curated by FotoVisura & Photoville, Photoville Festival, Brooklyn, New York
- 2012: Winter in America, curated by FotoVisura, Third Floor Gallery, Cardiff, UK
- 2012: The Homecoming Project, The End Of War Exhibition, Tilt Gallery, Phoenix, Arizona
- 2012: The Homecoming Project, The End Of War Exhibition, Northlight Gallery, Phoenix, Arizona
- 2012: Soldier, At Ease, Houston Center of Photography, Houston, Texas
- 2012: War/Photography: Images of Armed Conflict and Its Aftermath, Museum of Fine Arts Houston; work included in the permanent collection, Houston, Texas
- 2013: In War's Wake: The Aftermath of Iraq and Afghanistan, hosted by The Homecoming Project, The Dougherty Arts Center, Austin, Texas
- 2013: The Gun Show, Fovea Exhibitions, Beacon, New York
- 2013: Battle Company at The Somerville Toy Camera Fest, Nave Gallery Annex, Somerville, Massachusetts
- 2013: War/Photography: Images of Armed Conflict and Its Aftermath, The Annenberg Space for Photography, Los Angeles, and The Corcoran Gallery of Art, Washington D.C.
- 2014: 2014 Print Auction Exhibition, Houston Center For Photography, Houston, Texas
- 2014: Bosnia: 20 Years After The War, Projection, Slideluck Potshow, Austin
- 2014: War & Memory, co-curator and presenting artist, Fovea Exhibitions, Beacon, New York
- 2014: Soldier-Citizen-Artist, co-curator and presenting artist, The Mid-America Art Alliance Culture Lab Gallery, Kansas City, Missouri
- 2014: War & Memory, presented by The Homecoming Project in partnership with Fovea, Co-curator and artist, Photoville Festival, Brooklyn, New York
- 2014: The Homecoming, Projection, Besiktas International Festival of Photography, FotoIstanbul, Istanbul, Turkey
- 2015: 1 in 20 exhibition, featuring work from The Homecoming Project, Head On Photo Festival, Sydney, Australia
- 2015: We Are The YPJ, presented by United Photo Industries in The Fence exhibition, Boston; Atlanta; Houston; New York
- 2015: Battle Company and The War At Home, solo exhibition at Texas A&M University Gallery, Commerce, Texas
- 2015: War & Memory, presented by The Homecoming Project with Fovea and Photoville, Co-curator and artist, Photoville Festival, Hamburg, Germany
- 2015: The Homecoming Project, The University of Texas - San Antonio Gallery, San Antonio, Texas
- 2016: The Homecoming Project Screening, The PhotoJourn Festival in Bangkok, Thailand
