= Mark Powell (photographer) =

American photographer (born 1968)

Mark Alor Powell
- Born: 1968 (age 57–58); Decatur, Illinois
- Known for: Artist
- Notable work: Photos of street scenes and unusual people in Detroit and Mexico City
- Website: markalor.com

Mark Alor Powell (born 1968) is an American photographer. He is best known for his photos of street scenes and unusual people in Detroit and Mexico City.

== Life and work ==
Powell was born in 1968 in Decatur, Illinois.

He was a member of the In-Public street photography collective.

== Publications ==
=== Publications by Powell ===
- V.I.P. (Very Important Person). Mexico City: Diamantina, 2006. ISBN 968-5467-12-9.
- Open at Noon. Mexico City: Editorial RM, 2014. ISBN 978-8415118886.

=== Publications with contributions by Powell ===
- Fotolog Book: A Global Snapshot for the Digital Age. London: Thames and Hudson, 2006. ISBN 9780500512517. Over 1,000 images selected from the online photo journals found on the Fotolog photoblog website.
- La Ciudad de Mexico (translation: Mexico City). Mexico City: Fundación Televisa, 2008. Spanish.
- Los que se Quedan (translation: Those Who Remain). Mexico City: Diamantina, 2009. ISBN 978-6-079534-50-9. Spanish. "Book inspired by the documentary film that speaks with families in Mexico of people who have gone to work in the United States. Touches on the economic and social impact on the divided families from the point of view of those who remain in Mexico, rather than those who emigrate."
- Street Photography Now. London: Thames & Hudson, 2010. ISBN 978-0-500-54393-1 (hardback). London: Thames & Hudson, 2011. ISBN 978-0-500-28907-5 (paperback). Edited by Sophie Howarth and Stephen McLaren.
- 100 Great Street Photographs. Munich, London, New York: Prestel, 2017. By David Gibson. ISBN 978-3791383132. Contains a commentary on and a photograph by Powell.
