= Jesse Marlow =

Australian street photographer

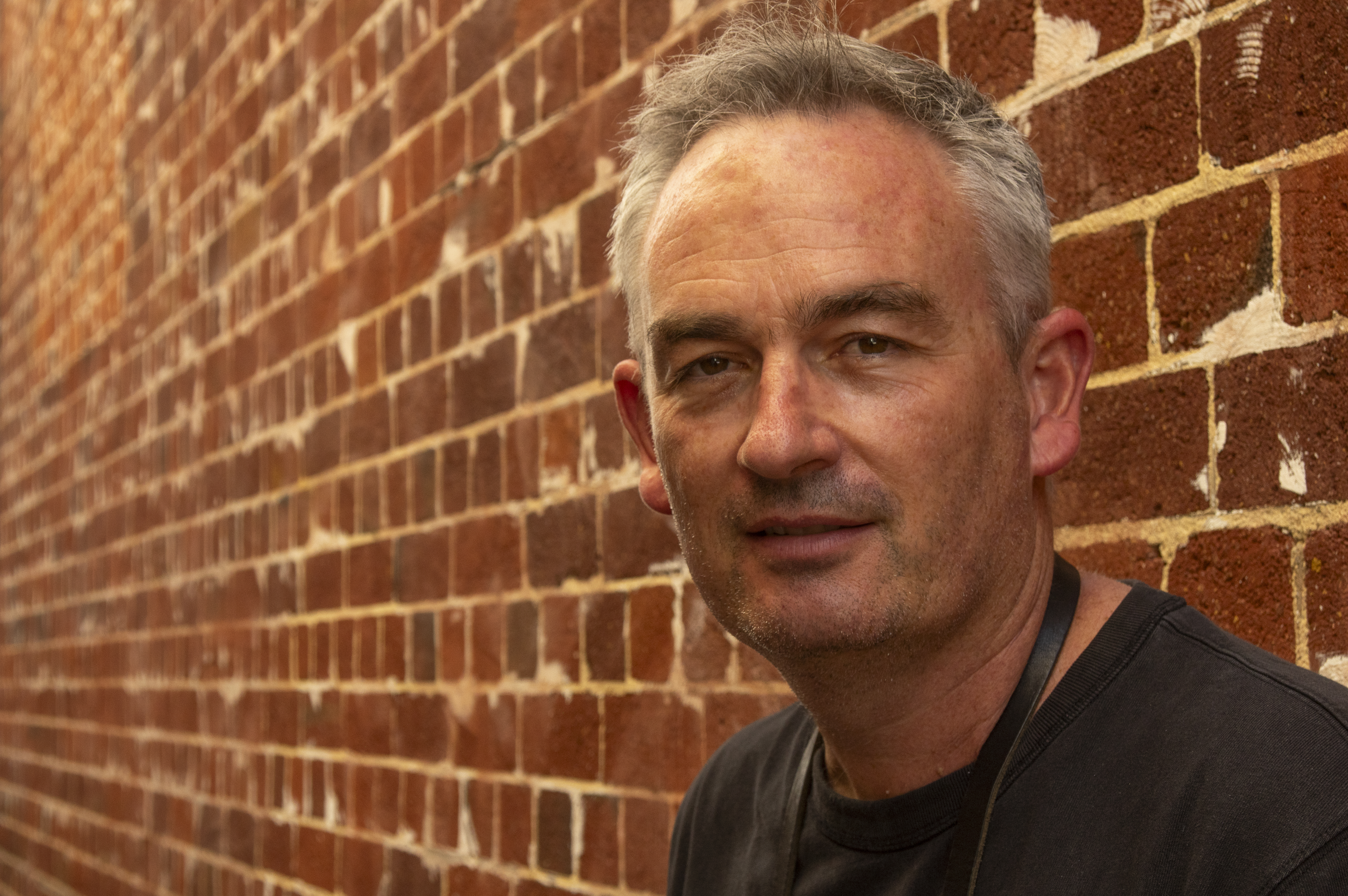
Jesse Marlow in Perth

Jesse Marlow (born 1978) is an Australian street photographer, editorial and commercial photographer who lives and works in Melbourne.

Marlow's personal work has been published in three books of his own, and in various books with others; it has been exhibited in a number of solo exhibitions in Australia, and group exhibitions internationally; and is held in the public collections of the City of Melbourne, and the State Library of Victoria, both in Melbourne, Australia. He won first prize in the 2011 London Street Photography Festival's International Street Photography Award, and in the 2012 Bowness Photography Prize.

He was a member of the Australian documentary photography collective Oculi, from 2003 to 2012, and was a member of the In-Public street photography collective from 2001.

== Life and work ==
Marlow was born in 1978 in Melbourne, Australia.

Marlow says he was first inspired to make street photography at age eight by the book Subway Art (1984), which documents the early history of New York City's graffiti movement. He subsequently borrowed his mother's SLR camera and documented graffiti in Melbourne during school holidays, with his mother driving him around. He continued to photograph graffiti for ten years. His photography education was a "basic one-year course in photography at a commercial college". Marlow says he was next significantly inspired at college by the work of photographers Robert Frank, Henri Cartier-Bresson and Alex Webb, and more recently by architecture, design and the Australian painters Jeffrey Smart and Howard Arkley.

For his first book, Centre Bounce: Football from Australia's Heart (2003), Marlow documented a series of Australian rules football carnivals (a national championship series) in Aboriginal Australian communities in the Northern Territory. He made trips to the outback (the vast, remote, arid interior of Australia) over four years to photograph the game that has a rich tradition and is played with a "commitment and passion not seen anywhere else around the country". Marlow's second book, Wounded (2005), shows people going about their routines, yet with visible injury. He was inspired after breaking his arm and unable to operate a camera, he became tuned to noticing others in a similar position and they were subsequently all he photographed for the next two years. He has said that his "aim with the project was to show that despite people suffering obvious superficial injuries, human beings dust themselves off and get on with life." These first two books were made in black and white. For his next book, Don’t Just Tell Them, Show Them (2014) he changed to colour photography. All his personal work to date has been made on 35 mm film, using rangefinder cameras.

Marlow became a member of the In-Public street photography collective in 2001. He was a member of Oculi, an Australian documentary photography collective, from 2003 to 2012. He then joined M.33, both a collective of Australian photographers and gallery representation.

== Publications ==
=== Publications by Marlow ===
- Centre Bounce: Football from Australia's Heart. Melbourne: Self-published / Hardie Grant Books, 2003. ISBN 9781740660501. With an introduction by Michael Long, foreword by Martin Flanagan, and an essay by Neil Murray ("Desert Footy").
- Wounded. Melbourne: Self-published / Sling Shot, 2005. ISBN 9780646450445. Edition of 1000 copies. Black and white photographs.
- Don't Just Tell Them, Show Them. Melbourne: M.33, 2014. ISBN 9780987167064. Edition of 1000 copies. Colour photographs.
- Second City. Melbourne: Self-published / Sling Shot, 2021. ISBN 9780646450445. With a foreword by Tony Birch. Edition of 1000 copies. Black and white photographs.

=== Publications with contributions by Marlow ===
- The Hour of the Wolf. Melbourne: PenFolk, 2007. ISBN 9781875894635. Poems by Joachim Matschoss and photographs by Marlow. Work resulting from Matschoss and Marlow having explored Melbourne in the period between night and dawn, the hour of the wolf.
- The Day the World Stopped to Run: The Human Race 10K. New York: Melcher Media, 2008. ISBN 978-1595910516.
- G.D Technology and Art: a story of innovation narrated by eighteen contemporary artists. Milan: Electa, 2008. Edited by Ludovico Pratesi.
- Reportage: a Retrospective 1999–2009. Bondi Junction, Sydney: Reportage, 2010. Edited by Jacqui Vicario and Stephen Dupont. OCLC 747408672. With a foreword by Robert McFarlane. Edition of 200 copies. Catalogue of an exhibition of photographs from The Reportage Festival of Photojournalism, 1999 to 2009, shown at the National Art School in Sydney.
- Street Photography Now. London: Thames & Hudson, 2010. ISBN 978-0-500-54393-1 (hardback). London: Thames & Hudson, 2011. ISBN 978-0-500-28907-5 (paperback). Edited by Sophie Howarth and Stephen McLaren.
- Oculi. Melbourne: Hardie Grant, 2010. ISBN 978-1740669498. Edited by the Oculi Photography Group. With an introduction by David Marr ("Eye of the Beholder"), and essays by Kyla McFarlane and Dean Sewell. A survey of the work of the then current members of Oculi, published to mark its tenth anniversary.
- 10 – 10 Years of In-Public. London: Nick Turpin Publishing, 2010. ISBN 978-0-9563322-1-9. Includes an essay by Jonathan Glancey, "Outlandish Harmony"; a foreword by Nick Turpin; and a chapter each by Marlow and others.
- Hijacked III: Australia / United Kingdom. Heidelberg, Germany: Kehrer, 2012. ISBN 978-3868282856. Edited by Mark McPherson, Louise Clements, and Leigh Robb. Published in conjunction with an exhibition at Derby QUAD, Derby, UK, and Perth Cultural Centre, Perth, Australia.
- Characters: Cultural Stories Revealed Through Typography. By Stephen Banham. London: Thames & Hudson; Melbourne: State Library of Victoria, 2012. ISBN 9780500500262. With a foreword by Rick Poynor. Marlow contributed photographs to accompany text along with four other photographers.
- Laying Foundations for Change: capital investments of the Atlantic Philanthropies. By Atlantic Philanthropies. Magnum Foundation, 2014. ISBN 9780692279236. Two volumes. (Note: A PDF of the book can be downloaded here from the Atlantic Philanthropies and Magnum Foundation site for the book. Marlow's work appears on pages 290–295)
- The World Atlas of Street Photography. New Haven and London: Yale University Press, 2014. ISBN 978-0-300-20716-3. Edited by Jackie Higgins. With a foreword by Max Kozloff.
- The Street Photographer's Manual. London: Thames & Hudson, 2014. ISBN 978-0-500-29130-6. By David Gibson. Includes profiles on In-Public photographers.

== Exhibitions ==
=== Solo exhibitions ===
- Centre Bounce: Football from Australia's Heart, Alcaston Gallery, Fitzroy, Melbourne, 2003; then toured regional galleries nationally including Araluen Cultural Precinct, Alice Springs, Northern Territory, 2004; Lake Macquarie City Art Gallery, Booragul, New South Wales, 2005 ("Supplemented in an adjoining gallery with On Side, an exhibition of photographs taken by the local community in collaboration with Marlow and well-known indigenous photographer Merv Bishop"); and elsewhere.
- Don’t Just Tell Them, Show Them, Crossley & Scott, Melbourne, 2007.
- Don’t Just Tell Them, Show Them... Continued, Melbourne, 2010.
- OAO (One And Only), Anna Pappas Gallery, Prahran, Melbourne, Australia, 2011. Photographs of "graffiti in the Central Australian Desert as a vehicle of expression for indigenous youths".
- OAO (One And Only) #6 2007-9 and #9 2007-9, Billboard Installation 2, City of Yarra, Victoria, Australia, 2011. Two photographs from Marlow's One And Only series on two billboards, part of Yarra City Council's Out There public artwork program.
- Don’t Just Tell Them, Show Them (Part 3), Anna Pappas Gallery, Melbourne, Australia, 2012.
- Snapshots, Whitehorse Artspace, Box Hill Town Hall, City of Whitehorse, 2014. City of Whitehorse 20 year anniversary commission. (Note: The photographs can be seen here in the Sarah Ewing Agency site.)

=== Exhibitions with others or during festivals ===
- Life: Flinders St. Station, Platform2 (exhibition space), Campbell Arcade / Degraves Street Subway, Flinders Street railway station, Melbourne, 2000. Part of Platform, a Making Space project artist-run initiative (ARI), by the Victorian Initiatives of Artists Network.
- Heavenly Creatures. Mythology & Reality, Heide Museum of Modern Art, Bulleen, Melbourne, Australia, 2004/2005. Thirty-five works exploring the iconography of the angel in modern and contemporary Australian art. Paintings, earthenware, photographs, works on paper and kinetic sculpture. Included Marlow's Ngukurr Bulldogs coach and players, 2003. Curated by Melissa Keys.
- Risk, exhibition of World Press Photo's 2006 Joop Swart Masterclass, Foam Fotografiemuseum Amsterdam, Amsterdam, 2006/2007. Marlow's series about Indigenous Australians in Alice Springs, made specifically for the master class, was shown. (Note: The photographs from this series, along with a description, can be viewed here within the Agence Vu site.)
- Leica/Centre for Contemporary Photography Documentary Photography Award, Centre for Contemporary Photography (CCP), Melbourne, Australia, 2007, and toured nationally. A survey of contemporary Australian documentary photography in series format. Photographs by the winner and finalists of the Award.
- Australian Rules: Around the Grounds, Monash Gallery of Art, City of Monash, Melbourne, 2007; then toured to Central Goldfields Art Gallery, Maryborough, Queensland, Australia, 2009.
- Reportage a Retrospective Exhibition 1999–2009, National Art School, Sydney, November 2010. Curated by Jacqui Vicario, Stephen Dupont, Michael Amendolia, Jack Picone, and David Dare Parker. Photographs from The Reportage Festival of Photojournalism, 1999 to 2009.
- Terra Australias Incognita: A Photographic Survey = unknown land of the south, Manly Art Gallery and Museum, 2010; then toured to Monash Gallery of Art, City of Monash, Melbourne, 2012. Photographs by Oculi members. Curated by Sandy Edwards.
- in-public @ 10, Photofusion, Brixton, London, 2010. (Note: The Photofusion website claims it showed the exhibition in 2012 but it actually did so in 2010.) Travelled to Les Ballades Photographiques de Seyssel, Seyssel, France, 2011; Photographs by In-Public members.
- Street Photography Now, Third Floor Gallery, Cardiff, 2010, and toured to Contributed Studio for the Arts, Berlin, 2010/2011; Museum of Printing, Historical Museum of Warsaw, Warsaw, 2011/2012. Photographs from the book Street Photography Now (2011).
- Street Photography Now, shop windows throughout the Canal Saint-Martin area, part of Mois de la Photo-OFF, Paris, 2010; Gallery Lichtblick, Cologne, 2010; Uno Art Space, Stuttgart, 2011.
- Derby Museum and Art Gallery, Format International Photography Festival (Right Here, Right Now – Exposures From The Public Realm), Derby, UK, 2011. Exhibition of photographs by In-Public members and the film In-Sight (2011).
- Excerpts from Don't Just Tell Them, Show Them, German Gymnasium, London Street Photography Festival, London, 2011.
- From Distant Streets: Contemporary International Street Photography, Galerie Hertz, Louisville, KY, 2011. Part of Louisville Photo Biennial. Curated by Richard Bram. Included 14 In-Public members, of the 29 photographers included.
- 2012 Bowness Photography Prize, Monash Gallery of Art, City of Monash, Melbourne, 2012. Exhibition of various winners.
- Geomorphometries – Contemporary Terrains, Queensland Centre for Photography, October–November 2012.
- iN-PUBLiC: An Exhibition of Street Photography, Thailand Creative and Design Centre, Bangkok, Thailand, 2013. In conjunction with the British Council. Photographs by In-Public members.
- In Public, Snickarbacken 7, Stockholm, Sweden, 2013. Photographs by In-Public members.
- Miami Street Photography Festival, Miami, FL, 2013. In-Public group exhibition along with other collectives STRATA and CALLE 35.
- Don't Just Tell Them, Show Them book, Australian Photo Book Of The Year Award exhibition, Asia Pacific Photobook Archive, Melbourne, Australia, 2015. Exhibition of finalists in the book competition.
- Public Hoarding Project, outside in Chapter House Lane, Melbourne, 2015.
- Island - Australia, The Copper House Gallery, Dublin, 2015. Part of PhotoIreland 2015 festival.
- The Sharp Eye. In-Public in Mexico, Foto Mexico, Cine Tonalá, Mexico City, Mexico, 2015. Slideshow of photographs. Curated by Mark Powell, Carlos Álvarez Montero and Alfredo Esparza.

== Awards ==
- 2006: Selected to take part in World Press Photo's Joop Swart Masterclass, where photojournalists who are considered notable are selected to mentor a group of young photographers.
- 2007: One of 15 finalists, Leica/Centre for Contemporary Photography (CCP) Documentary Photography Award, Melbourne for excerpts from Don't Just Tell Them, Show Them.
- 2011: First prize, London Street Photography Festival - International Street Photography Award, London, for excerpts from Don't Just Tell Them, Show Them.
- 2012: $25000 first prize, 2012 Bowness Photography Prize, Monash Gallery of Art, Melbourne, Australia, for "Laser vision" from Don't Just Tell Them, Show Them.
- 2014: One of 15 finalists, Australian Photo Book Of The Year Award, for Don't Just Tell Them, Show Them (2014).

== Films with contributions by Marlow ==
- In-Sight (2011). 38 minute documentary directed and edited by Nick Turpin, commissioned by Format for Format International Photography Festival, Derby, 2011. Includes interviews with In-Public photographers Marlow, Turpin, Gibson, Solomons, Bram, Einzig, Gus Powell, Agou, and Snoek, and shows them at work. (Note: The film is available to watch here within Turpin's site.)

== Collections ==
Marlow's work is held in the following public collections:

- City of Melbourne, Melbourne
- Monash Gallery of Art, City of Monash, Melbourne
- State Library of Victoria, Melbourne
