= Dave Jordano =

American photographer

- Website: www.davejordanophotography.com

Dave Jordano (born 9 May 1948) is an American documentary, commercial and fine art photographer who lives and works in Chicago, IL.

== Life and work ==
Jordano was born in 1948 in Detroit, Michigan. He attended the College for Creative Studies and received a BFA in photography in 1974. Shortly after Jordano moved to Chicago, and in 1977 he started a commercial photography business in Chicago. As a commercial photographer Jordano worked with Crate & Barrel, Starbucks, Nestle, Sears, McDonald's, General Mills, Kraft, Kitchen Aid, Oscar Mayer, and Kellogg's.

Jordano has been producing fine art photography since 2001, when he began work on Chicago Bridge Project, photographs of bridges and other industrial structures in and around Chicago.

From 2002 to 2003 Jordano turned his focus to the landscape and inhabitants of Marktown neighborhood in East Chicago, Indiana.

Between 2003 and 2007 Jordano completed his Articles of Faith project, photographs of small African-American storefront churches on the south and west sides of Chicago.

Jordano's next project was Prairieland, in which he explored the rural landscape of Illinois and its inhabitants.

== Publications ==
- Assembled works. Paper Mirror, 2003. ISBN 978-0970727831.
- Articles of Faith: African-American Community Churches in Chicago (Center Books on Chicago and Environs). Chicago: University of Chicago Press, 2009. ISBN 978-1930066977.
- Detroit: Unbroken Down. Brooklyn, NY: PowerHouse, 2015. ISBN 978-1576877791. Text by Nancy Watson Barr, Dawoud Bey and Sharon Zukin.
- A Detroit Nocturne. Brooklyn, NY: PowerHouse. 2018. ISBN 978-1576878705.

== Exhibitions ==
- 2008: Marktown, city gallery of Chicago in the Chicago Water Tower, Chicago, IL.
- 2009: Articles of Faith, Chicago Cultural Center, Chicago, IL, 4 April - 28 June 2009.
- 2015: Detroit-Unbroken Down, Third Floor Gallery, Cardiff, Wales, 1–31 October 2015. Part of Diffusion: Cardiff International Festival of Photography.

== Collections ==
Jordano's work is held in the following permanent collections:

- Museum of Contemporary Photography in Chicago, IL.
- Museum of Fine Arts, Boston, Boston, MA.
- Museum of Fine Arts, Houston, Houston, Houston, TX.
- Federal Reserve Bank, Chicago, IL.
- Mary and Leigh Block Museum of Art at Northwestern University in Evanston, IL.
