= W. W. Winter =

Coordinates: 52°54′54″N 1°27′59″W

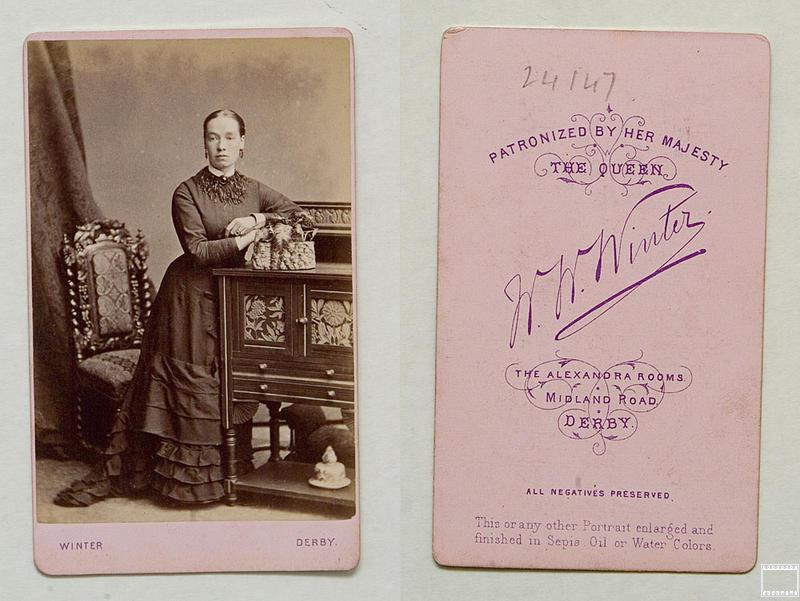
W. W. Winter, Derby cabinet card

W. W. Winter is a photography studio in Derby, the "longest running photography business in Britain". The origins of the business have been traced back to 1852. The studio in Midland Road was built in 1867 by Walter William Winter.

In 2014, the studio had a Heritage Lottery Fund (HLF) grant of £51,800 to begin preserving and cataloguing its glass negative photographs. In 2017, to celebrate 150 years in the same premises, an exhibition was held at Derby Museum and Art Gallery.

The W. W. Winter Heritage Trust is a UK registered charity dedicated to its preservation.
