= Michelle Groskopf =

Canadian photographer

Michelle Groskopf is a Canadian photographer.

== Life ==
Groskopf grew up in the 1980s in a suburb of Toronto. As an adult, she moved to Europe and then New York City, where she worked as a television producer and as a professor at the School of Visual Arts. In 2012, she moved from New York City to Los Angeles, and was inspired by its similarities to her childhood home.

Groskopf's partner is Sasha Tivetsky, who is also a photographer.

== Work ==
Groskopf got started as a photographer by using her free time to experiment with street photography. After she began sharing her photos, she began receiving offers for work and exhibitions. Her first commercial photo shoot was for Apple Inc.

In July and August 2018, Groskopf took the photographs for a feature in the 25th anniversary issue of Wired. Anna Goldwater Alexander, the magazine's photography director, wrote that "Groskopf's technique is like nothing I've ever seen" and that she was particularly attracted to "[bright] colors and interesting textures". She used a Sony α7R III to take the photos, and the average shoot took 7 minutes.

In 2020, Groskopf worked with other photographers and Diversify Photo to create a list of Black photographers for brands and publications to hire.

== Reception ==
In 2018, The New Yorker described Groskopf as having "brought the tradition of New York street photographers" with her when she moved from New York to Los Angeles, and characterized her photography as "vivacious".

In 2019, Groskopf was included in the Photo District News list of 30 new and emerging photographers to watch. Creative Review described her photography as "big without trying".
