= Jens Olof Lasthein =

Swedish freelance photographer (born 1964)

Jens Olof Lasthein (born 1964) is a Swedish freelance photographer. His widely exhibited work principally covers scenes before and after the wars in former Yugoslavia and other borderlands across Europe, for instance the area around the old Iron Curtain.

== Early life ==
Born in Sweden in 1964, Lasthein grew up in Denmark. After school, he travelled widely in Asia and eastern Europe. He worked in a shipyard and as a bus driver before studying photography at Nordens Fotoskola (the Nordic Photo School) in Stockholm (1989–1992).

== Photography ==
Since 1992, Lasthein has lived in Stockholm and worked as a freelance photographer for magazines and newspapers as well as on his own projects. Two of his major projects, which have formed the bases of his exhibitions and have also been published in book form, are described below.

=== Moments in Between ===
Moments in Between (1994–1999) presents photographs taken before, during and after the wars in the former Yugoslavia. According to Lasthein, it is an "attempt to understand life in the shadow of war".

=== White Sea, Black Sea ===
White Sea, Black Sea (2001–2007) documents a journey along the eastern border of the European Union from Arkhangelsk in the north to Odessa in the south. It explores the transition of the borderland between eastern and western Europe. Lasthein explains that his interest in eastern Europe began when he spent a week in Moscow in 1982 followed by two months hitchhiking in Romania, Hungary, Czechoslovakia and Poland in 1984. The first photographs to become part of the project were actually taken in St Petersburg in 1993 while he was doing a photographic report on the Russian mafia. Lasthein's project was reinforced by his irritation at a tendency in western Europe for people to forget about the areas of Europe to the east of the EU borders. He also sought to visit places which would help to provide answers to existential questions about who we are and why we are here.

In Lasthein's own words:

Basically the idea is to take the viewer on a visual journey through the borderland between European East and West. Not claiming any kind of truth, the conditions are decided by myself alone, in relation to my own internal boundaries: What can it be like being European? An attempt to open up some borders – my own, and maybe even others.

== Panoramic views ==
Lasthein's photographs are taken with a panoramic camera which gives them a Cinemascope appearance. He became acquainted with the technique in 1991 when he followed the work of film directors Sergio Leone and Akira Kurosawa. Using an extremely wide angle of 140°, he decided to apply it to still photography. It provided possibilities of complexity, allowing more than one story to be included in the picture. It also gave him scope for theatrical scenes where everything is happening at once. Finally, he believes the technique creates conditions for the viewer to believe in the picture.

== Assessment ==
Commenting on White Sea, Black Sea, Swedish photographer Marie Lundquist sees a special kind of Slavic melancholy in Lasthein's pictures. Some of the photographs convey such a homely feeling that they look as if they have been taken from a family album. But they are not just about people (or animals); they also show the surrounding environment with empty waiting rooms, overgrown road signs or geese marching towards a cathedral. The use of panorama allows the photographer to depict everyday scenes, often with a humorous touch, in which different people react to each other. Lasthein also has an ability to make use of the warm afternoon light to create an overwhelming sense of space, extending far beyond the narrow pages of the book.

== Books ==
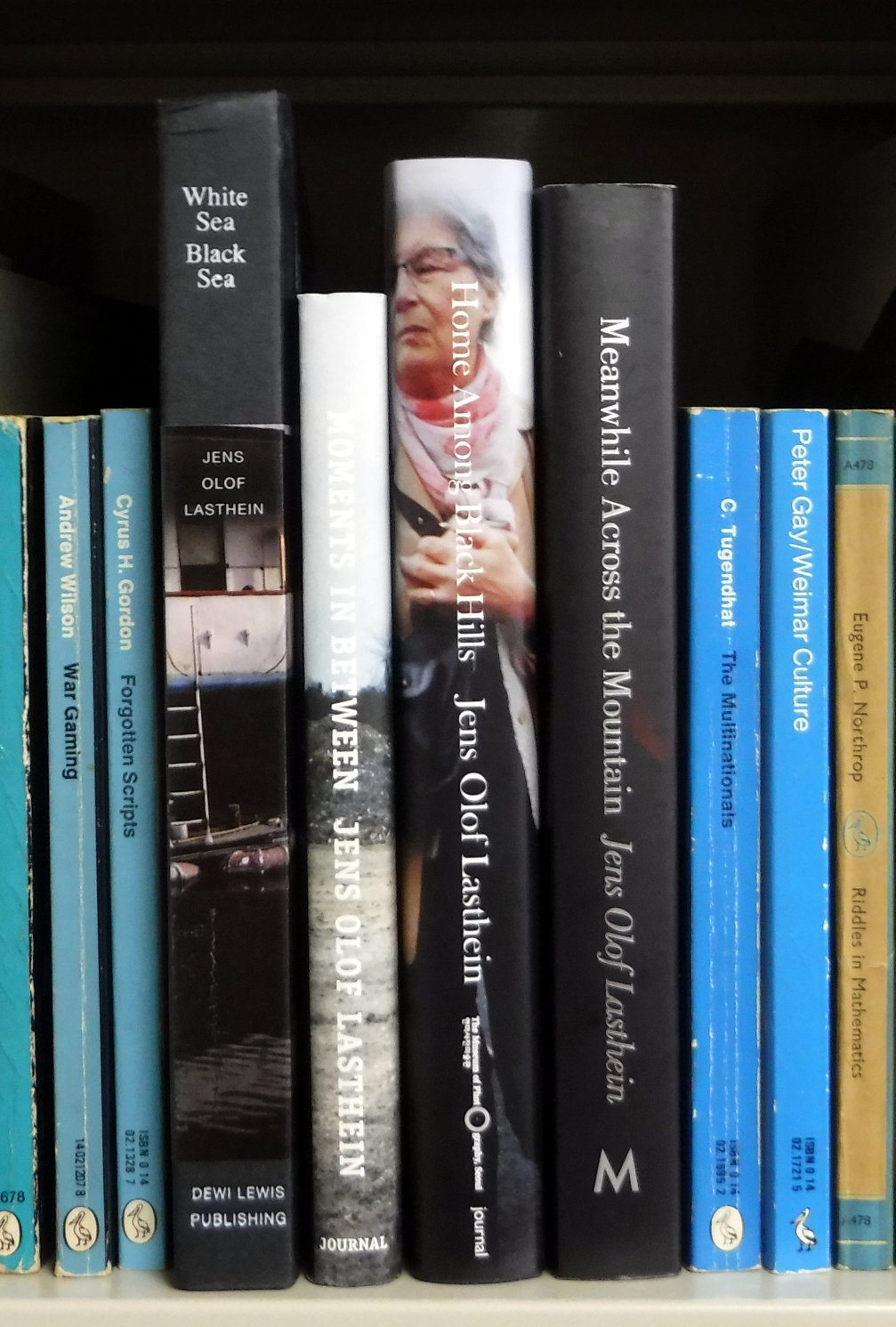
Four photobooks by Jens Olof Lasthein (flanked by irrelevant Pelicans)

- Christer Berglund (text); Jens Olof Lasthein (photographs). Het sommar. Stockholm: LL-förl., 1996. ISBN 91-88180-78-6. In Swedish.
- Jens Olof Lasthein (photographs); Jesper Lindau (text). Moments in between: pictures from former Yugoslavia / bilder från forna Jugoslavien. Stockholm: Journal, 2000, 130 pp. ISBN 91-973629-6-4. In Swedish and English.
- Jens Olof Lasthein. White Sea, Black Sea: bilder från gränslandet mellan Europas öst och väst. Stockholm: Max Ström, 2008, 170 pp. ISBN 978-91-7126-124-3. Text in Swedish.
  - Jens Olof Lasthein; Kevin Billinghurst (translation). White Sea, Black Sea: A visual journey along the eastern border of the European Union. Stockport: Dewi Lewis, 2008. ISBN 1-904587-60-7. Text in English.
- Jens Olof Lasthein. Home among black hills. Stockholm: Journal, 2014. ISBN 9789198125368. Text in English, French, Swedish and Korean.
- Jens Olof Lasthein. Meanwhile across the mountain: Pictures from the Caucasus. Max Strom, 2017. ISBN 978-9171263674. Text in English.
- Jens Olof Lasthein. Far near. Sweden: Diep Publishing, 2022. ISBN 978-91-527-3667-8. (Note: Far Near, described by its publisher.)

== Exhibitions ==
- Moments in between, Preus fotomuseum, Horten, Norway, 2003
- The Border, Fotoforum West, Innsbruck, Austria, 2006
- White Sea and Black Sea, Hanmi Foundation of Arts and Culture, Seoul, South Korea, 2008
- The Museum of Work, Norrköping, Sweden, 2008
- White Sea, Black Sea, Gallery of Photography, Dublin, Ireland, 2009
- Black Sea, White Sea, Photo Festival Images Singulières, Sète, France, 2009
- White Sea Black Sea, Month of Photography, Dom umenia, Bratislava, Slovakia, 2009
- De la mer Noire à la mer Blanche. Musée de la Photographie, Charleroi, Belgium, 2010

== Awards ==
- ETC photo award (2001)
- Shortlisted for the European Central Bank annual photography award (2008)
- The Museum of Work, Norrköping, Sweden: Prize for documentary photography (2008)
- Leica Oskar Barnack Award (2010)
