= Blue Sky Gallery =

Photography gallery in Portland, Oregon, U.S.

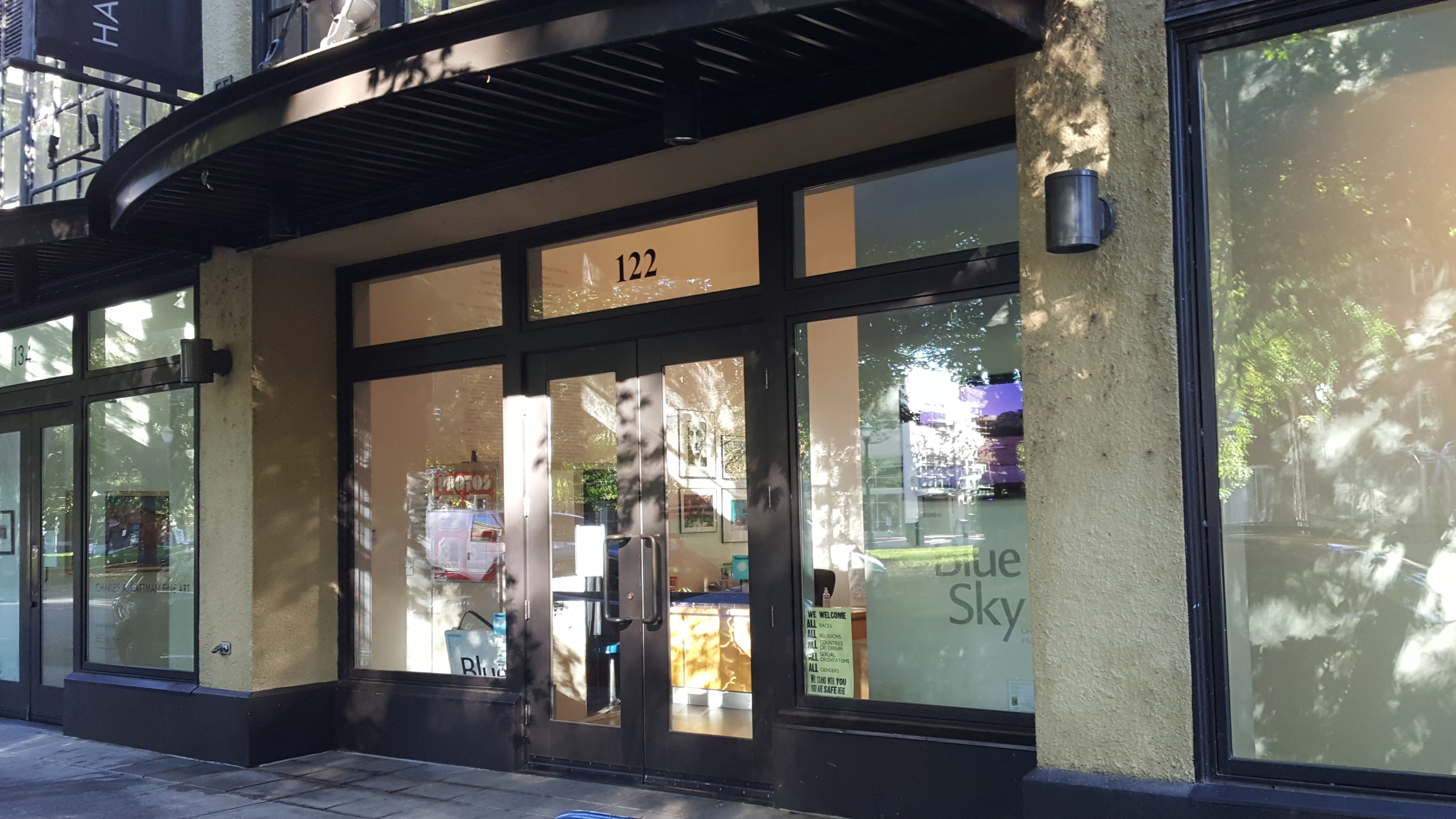
- Entrance to the gallery, 2020
- Established: 1975
- Location: Portland, Oregon, U.S
- Coordinates: 45.5242°N 122.6783°W
- Type: Exhibition space and archive for photography
- Website: www.blueskygallery.org

Blue Sky Gallery, also known as The Oregon Center for the Photographic Arts, is a non-profit exhibition space for contemporary photography in Portland, Oregon, United States.

== History ==
In 1975 a group of five young photographers—Robert Di Franco, Craig Hickman, Ann Hughes, Terry Toedtemeier, and Christopher Rauschenberg (son of Robert Rauschenberg)—pooled their resources to start a small gallery on NW Lovejoy Street in Portland Oregon. The gallery relocated several times over the years, to NW Fifth Avenue in 1978, then to NW Hoyt Street in 1987, where it remained for just under twenty years. In 2007 Blue Sky raised $2.7 million and moved into the former North Park Blocks store and warehouse of Daisy Kingdom, (Note: Daisy Kingdom had been acquired by Springs Industries in October 1996, according to the Portland Business Journal.)

The gallery "has introduced more than 700 emerging and established photographers to the region" according to the Portland Art Museum.

== See also ==
- Culture of Portland, Oregon
