= David Gibson (photographer) =

British street photographer and writer

David Gibson (1957) is a British street photographer and writer on photography. He was a member of the In-Public street photography collective. Gibson's books include The Street Photographer's Manual (2014) and 100 Great Street Photographs (2017) (also published as Street Photography: a History in 100 Iconic Images). His photography has also been published in a number of survey publications on street photography, and exhibited in group exhibitions in Britain (including at the Museum of London, which acquired his work for its permanent collection), at the Museum of the City of New York, and in France, Bangkok and Stockholm.

== Life and work ==
Gibson was born in 1957 in Ilford, Essex, UK. He worked for several years as a care worker. His early published photographs were of the elderly, children and the disabled, in Community Care magazine.

Gibson completed an MA in Photography: History and Culture at University of the Arts London in 2002. He is a street photographer, a writer on photography, and leads street photography workshops. He was one of the earliest photographers to join the In-Public street photography collective, founded by Nick Turpin in 2000.

== Publications ==
=== Books by Gibson ===
- The Street Photographer's Manual. London: Thames & Hudson, 2014. ISBN 978-0-500-29130-6. Includes profiles on David Solomons, Matt Stuart, Nils Jorgensen, Trent Parke, Jesse Marlow, David Solomons and Narelle Autio; also includes contributions from Paul Russell, Nick Turpin, Richard Bram, Andy Morley-Hall, Gus Powell, and others.
  - Street Photography: Manual de Fotografía de Calle. Blume, 2014. ISBN 978-8416138272. Spanish-language version.
  - Street Photography: le Savoir Faire du Photographe de Rue. Dunod, 2014. ISBN 978-2100711352. French-language version.
  - Manual do Fotógrafo de Rua. GG, 2015. ISBN 9788584520404. Portuguese-language version.
  - Street Photography: Manuale del Fotografo di Strada. Castello, 2016. ISBN 978-8865207383. Italian-language version.
- 100 Great Street Photographs. Munich, London, New York: Prestel, 2017. Text by Gibson, photographs by various photographers. ISBN 978-3791383132.
  - Street Photography: a History in 100 Iconic Images. Munich, London, New York: Prestel, 2019. ISBN 978-3791384887.
  - Street Photography: die 100 besten Bilder. Munich, London, New York: Prestel, 2017. ISBN 978-3-7913-8335-4. German-language version.

=== Zines by Gibson ===
- Subtitles for Life. London: Bump, 2020. Edited by David Solomons. Edition of 200 copies.

=== Publications with contributions by Gibson ===
- Publication #1. London: Nick Turpin, 2009. Includes an essay by Gibson. Edition of 2000 copies.
- 10 – 10 Years of In-Public. London: Nick Turpin, 2010. ISBN 978-0-9563322-1-9. Includes an essay by Jonathan Glancey, a foreword by Turpin, and a chapter each by Gibson and others.
- Street Photography Now. London: Thames & Hudson, 2010. ISBN 978-0-500-54393-1 (hardback). London: Thames & Hudson, 2011. ISBN 978-0-500-28907-5 (paperback). Edited by Sophie Howarth and Stephen McLaren.
- London Street Photography: 1860–2010. London: Museum of London; Stockport: Dewi Lewis, 2011. ISBN 978-1907893032. Selected from the Museum of London collection by Mike Seaborne and Anna Sparham. Published to accompany an exhibition at the Museum of London.

== Films ==
- In-Sight (2011). 38 minute documentary directed and edited by Nick Turpin, commissioned by Format for Format International Photography Festival, Derby, 2011. Includes interviews with Gibson, Turpin, Solomons, Bram, Einzig, Gus Powell, Agou, Marlow and Snoek, and shows them at work. (Note: The film is available to watch here within Turpin's site.)

== Exhibitions with others or during festivals ==
- Onto the Streets, Photofusion, London, 21 July – 16 September 2006, then toured with the British Council. Curated by Stephen McLaren and Sophie Howarth.
- in-public @ 10, Photofusion, Brixton, London, 28 May – 9 July 2010. (Note: The Photofusion website claims it showed the exhibition in 2012 but it actually did so in 2010.) Travelled to Les Ballades Photographiques de Seyssel, Seyssel, France, 12–23 July 2011. Included photographs by various In-Public members.
- Street Photography Now, Third Floor Gallery, Cardiff, 10 October – 14 November 2010. Photographs featured in the book Street Photography Now (2011).
- Derby Museum and Art Gallery, Format International Photography Festival, Derby, UK, 4 March – 3 April 2011. Exhibition of photographs by various In-Public members, and the film In-Sight (2011).
- London Street Photography: 1860-2010, Museum of London, London, 18 February – 4 September 2011. Included work by Gibson and others. Travelled to the Museum of the City of New York, 27 July – 2 December 2012.
- Contemporary London Street Photography, London Festival of Photography, London, June–August 2012.
- iN-PUBLiC: An Exhibition of Street Photography, Thailand Creative and Design Centre, Bangkok, Thailand, February–March 2013. In conjunction with the British Council. Photographs by various In-Public members.
- In Public, Snickerbacken 7, Stockholm, Sweden, May–June 2013. Photographs by various In-Public members.
- The Sharp Eye. In-Public in Mexico, Foto Mexico, Cine Tonalá, Mexico City, Mexico, October–November 2015. Slideshow of photographs by various In-Public members. Curated by Mark Powell, Carlos Álvarez Montero and Alfredo Esparza.

== Collections ==
Gibson's work is held in the following permanent collection:

- Museum of London, London.
