= David Solomons (photographer) =

British street photographer (born 1965)

David Solomons (born 31 December 1965) is a British street photographer. He is known for his photographs in London, where he has made a trilogy of self-published books: Underground (2009), Up West (2015) and Kippers and Curtains (2018). He was a member of the In-Public street photography collective.

Up West was shown in a solo exhibition at Third Floor Gallery, Cardiff, in 2010 and his work is held in the collection of the Museum of London.

== Life and work ==
Solomons studied documentary photography at the University of South Wales in Newport between 1993 and 1996. During this period he changed from primarily photographing in black and white to the colour work he is mostly known for. His first major piece of work, Underground, depicting people using the London Underground, was completed during his studies in Newport but not published for fifteen years.

He was a member of the In-Public street photography collective, having joined in 2008.

== Books ==
=== Books and zines by Solomons ===
- Underground. London: Bump, 2009. ISBN 978-0-9560320-0-3. Edition of 100 copies.
  - Underground Vol.1 & 2. London: Bump, 2021. Two volumes. With a text by Joni Karanka. Edition of 200 copies.
- Happenstance: Black and White Photographs: 1990–2007. London: Bump, 2009. ISBN 978-0-9560320-1-0. Edition of 200 copies.
- Up West. London: Bump, 2015. ISBN 978-0-9560320-2-7. With an introduction by David Gibson. Edition of 1000 copies.
- M11 Link Road Protest. Southport, Merseyside: Café Royal Books, 2016. Edition of 200 copies. (Note: The publisher's page about this is here.)
- Kippers and Curtains: London Bits and Bobs 1995 – 2018. London: Bump, 2018. ISBN 978-0-9560320-4-1.
- No Smoking. London: Bump, 2018. ISBN 978-0-9560320-3-4.
- The League of Bald Headed Men. London: Bump, 2019. Edition of 100 copies.
  - Updated and expanded second edition. London: Bump, 2020. Edition of 100 copies.
- Forty Winks. London: Bump, 2020. Edition of 100 copies.
  - Updated Second edition. London: Bump, 2020. Edition of 100 copies.
- London 1989-1995. London: Bump, 2020. Edition of 150 copies.
- London 1996-2001. London: Bump, 2020. Edition of 150 copies.
- Wales 1993-1995. London: Bump, 2020. Edition of 150 copies.
- Athens 1995. London: Bump, 2020. Edition of 150 copies.
- Brazil. London: Bump, 2020. Edition of 150 copies.
- The English Seaside 1995. London: Bump, 2020. Edition of 150 copies.
- Phone Booth. London: Bump, 2020. Edition of 100 copies.

=== Books with contributions by Solomons ===
- 10 – 10 Years of In-Public. London: Nick Turpin, 2010. ISBN 978-0-9563322-1-9. (Note: The publisher's page about this is here.)
- London Street Photography 1860–2010. London: Museum of London, 2011. ISBN 978-1-907893-03-2.
- The Street Photographer's Manual. London: Thames & Hudson, 2014. ISBN 978-0-500-29130-6. By David Gibson. Includes a chapter on Solomons.
- 100 Great Street Photographs. Munich, London, New York: Prestel, 2017. By David Gibson. ISBN 978-3791383132. Contains a commentary on and a photograph by Solomons.

== Exhibitions ==
=== Solo exhibitions ===
- Happenstance, Oxford House, London, November 2009.
- Up West, Third Floor Gallery, Cardiff, Wales, March 2010.
- No Smoking, Underground Gallery, London, May–June 2012.

=== Selected group exhibitions ===
- David Hodge Award, The Photographers' Gallery, London.
- A Looking Glass Eye: 21st Century London, Exit Gallery, London.
- 10 - 10 years of In-Public, Photofusion Gallery, London.
- Antennas, Voies Off, Arles, France.
- Right Here, Right Now – Exposures From The Public Realm, Derby Museum and Art Gallery, Format International Photography Festival, Derby, UK, March–April 2011. Exhibition of photographs by In-Public members and the film In-Sight (2011).
- London Street Photography: 1860-2010, Museum of London, London, February–September 2011. Travelled to Museum of the City of New York, July–December 2012.
- International Street Photography, German Gymnasium, London Street Photography Festival, London.
- From Distant Streets: Contemporary International Street Photography, Galerie Hertz, Louisville Photo Biennial, Louisville, KY, October–November 2011. Part of Louisville Photo Biennial. Curated by Richard Bram.
- Underground, The Print Space, London, with Dylan Thomas and Gesche Wuerfel.
- Contemporary London Street Photography, King's Cross Station, London Festival of Photography, London.
- iN-PUBLiC: An Exhibition of Street Photography, Thailand Creative and Design Centre, Bangkok, Thailand, February–March 2013. In conjunction with the British Council. Photographs by In-Public members.
- In Public, Snickerbacken 7, Stockholm, Sweden, May–June 2013. Photographs by In-Public members.
- The Sharp Eye. In-Public in Mexico, Foto Mexico, Cine Tonalá, Mexico City, Mexico, October–November 2015. Slideshow of photographs.

== Films ==
- In-Sight (2011). 38 minute documentary directed and edited by Nick Turpin, commissioned by Format for Format International Photography Festival, Derby, 2011. Includes interviews with Solomons and others, and shows him at work. (Note: The film is available to watch here within Turpin's site.)

== Collections ==
Solomons' work is held in the following public collection:

- Museum of London, London.
