= Trent Parke =

Australian photographer

Trent Parke is an Australian photographer. He is the husband of Narelle Autio, with whom he often collaborates. He has created a number of photography books; won numerous national and international awards including four World Press Photo awards; and his photographs are held in numerous public and private collections. He is a member of Magnum Photos.

== Early life ==
Parke was born in 1971 and brought up in Newcastle, New South Wales. He started photography when he was twelve. At age 13 he watched his mother die from an asthma attack. Parke studied photography at high school when it was introduced as an elective in 1987. His first part time job was at a Kodak store, giving him access to affordable film and processing material.

== Career ==
Parke has worked as a photojournalist for The Australian newspaper.

In 2003 he and his wife, the photographer Narelle Autio, made a 90,000 km trip around Australia, resulting in Parke's books Minutes to Midnight and The Black Rose.

Parke became a member of the In-Public street photography collective in 2001. He became a Magnum Photos nominee in 2002 and a member in 2007; the first Australian invited to join.

== Selected publications ==
=== As author ===
- Dream/Life. Kirribilli, N.S.W, Australia: Hot Chilli Press, 1999. ISBN 0-646-37991-7.
- The Seventh Wave: Photographs of Australian Beaches. Kirribilli, N.S.W, Australia: Hot Chilli Press, 2000. Hardback ISBN 0-646-39747-8. Paperback ISBN 0-646-39746-X. With Narelle Autio. Includes an essay on the beach in Australian culture by Robert Drewe.
- Minutes to Midnight. Paris: Filigranes Éditions, 2005. 32 pages, 20 plates, paperback. ISBN 978-2-35046-041-3.
- Bedknobs & Broomsticks. St. Paul, Minnesota: Little Brown Mushroom, 2010. ISBN 978-0-615-37550-2.
- The Christmas Tree Bucket – Trent Parke's Family Album. Göttingen: Steidl, 2013. ISBN 978-3869302065.
- Minutes to Midnight. Göttingen: Steidl, 2013. 96 pages, hardback. ISBN 978-3869302058.
  - Göttingen: Steidl, 2014. 96 pages, hardback. ISBN 978-3869302058.
- The Black Rose. Adelaide, Australia: Art Gallery of South Australia, 2015. Published to accompany an exhibition at the Art Gallery of South Australia, 14 March – 10 May 2015.
- Crimson Line. London: Stanley/Barker, 2020. ISBN 978-1-913288-13-6.
  - Second edition with subtle changes. London: Stanley/Barker, 2021. ISBN 978-1-913288-13-6.
- Cue The Sun. London: Stanley/Barker, 2021. ISBN 978-1-913288-37-2.
- Monument. London: Stanley/Barker, 2023. ISBN 978-1-913288-57-0.

=== As contributor ===
- So now then. Cardiff: Ffotogallery, 2006. ISBN 9781872771656. Edited by Paul Seawright and Christopher Coppock. Photographs by Parke, Shelby Lee Adams, Adam Broomberg & Oliver Chanarin, Chien-Chi Chang, Weng Fen, Julio Grinblatt, An-My Lê Susan Meiselas, Boris Mikhailov, Simon Norfolk, Paul Shambroom, Massimo Vitali and Michael Wesely. Essays by David Campany, "Straight pictures of a crooked world"; Martha Langford, "What use is photography"; and Jan-Erik Lundström, "Look and tell: some further thoughts on the documentary genre". An anthology of international documentary photography commissioned by Hereford Photo Festival. Edition of 1000.
- A Year in Photography: Magnum Archive. Munich: Prestel; New York, Paris, London, Tokyo: Magnum Photos, 2010. ISBN 978-3-7913-4435-5.
- 10 – 10 Years of In-Public. London: Nick Turpin, 2010. ISBN 978-0-9563322-1-9.
- Magnum Contact Sheets. Edited by Kristen Lubben.
  - Magnum Contact Sheets. London: Thames & Hudson, 2011. ISBN 9780500544129.
  - Magnum Contact Sheets. London: Thames & Hudson, 2014. ISBN 978-0500544310. Compact edition.
  - Magnum Contact Sheets: Trent Parke, The Seventh Wave, 2000 (Collector's Edition). London: Thames & Hudson, 2011. ISBN 978-0500544143.
- The Street Photographer's Manual. London: Thames & Hudson, 2014. ISBN 978-0-500-29130-6. By David Gibson. Includes a chapter on Parke.
- The World Atlas of Street Photography. New Haven and London: Yale University Press, 2014. ISBN 978-0-300-20716-3. Edited by Jackie Higgins. With a foreword by Max Kozloff.
- Photographers' Sketchbooks. London: Thames & Hudson, 2014. ISBN 9780500544341. Edited by Stephen McLaren and Bryan Formhals.
- 100 Great Street Photographs. Munich, London, New York: Prestel, 2017. By David Gibson. ISBN 978-3791383132. Contains a commentary on and a photograph by Parke.
- Home. Tokyo: Magnum Photos Tokyo, 2018. ISBN 978-4-9909806-0-3.

== Films ==
=== Films by Parke ===
- The Summation of Force – eight channel film directed by Parke, Autio, and Matthew Bate

=== Documentaries about Parke ===
- Dreamlives (2002). Directed and produced by Jennifer Crone. Includes Trent and Autio. OCLC 701130326
- Trent Parke: The Black Rose (2015). Directed by Catherine Hunter. Includes Parke, Autio and Geoff Dyer. Broadcast on ABC, 21 April 2015.

== Recognition and awards ==
Martin Parr and Gerry Badger say that Parke's first book Dream/Life is "as dynamic a set of street pictures as has been seen outside the United States or Japan".

Awards include:

- 1996–1998: 5 Gold Lenses, International Olympic Committee.
- 1999: Second prize, Daily Life category, World Press Photo Award (for "Bathurst Car Races").
- 2000: Second prize, Daily Life stories category, World Press Photo Award 1999 (for "The Seventh Wave").
- 2000: Canon photo essay prize, Sasakawa World Sports Awards.
- 2001: First prize, Nature stories category, World Press Photo Award 2000, with Narelle Autio (for "Australian Roadkill" series).
- 2003: W. Eugene Smith Grant from the W. Eugene Smith Memorial Fund.
- 2005: Third prize, Daily Life category, World Press Photo Award 2004 (for "Wiluna").
- 2007: Exhibiting Finalist – Australian National Photographic Portrait Prize.
- 2014: Winner of Photography category, Prudential Eye Awards by Global Eye Program.
- 2014: Deutscher Fotobuchpreis 2015, Gold medal, Konzeptionell-künstlerische Fotobildbänd (Conceptually-artistic photobook) category, went to Steidl for Minutes to Midnight, along with three other winners.

== Exhibitions ==
- 2000: The Seventh Wave (with Narelle Autio) – Stills Gallery, Sydney.
- 2002: Dream/Life and The Seventh Wave (with Narelle Autio) – Canvas International Art Gallery, Amsterdam.
- 2002: Dva Pivo Prosim (Two Beers Please) (with Narelle Autio) – Stills Gallery, Sydney.
- 2002: Sydney Treasures, Art & About, Sydney.
- 2002: Dream/Life & Beyond – Stills Gallery, Sydney.
- 2004: Dream/Life and The Seventh Wave (with Narelle Autio) – FotoFreo Photographic Festival, Western Australian Maritime Museum, Fremantle.
- 2004: Dream/Life and The Seventh Wave (with Narelle Autio) – Ariel Meyerowitz Gallery, New York.
- 2004: Suspended States, Sydney Arts Festival.
- 2004: Minutes to Midnight – Part One, Leica Gallery, Germany.
- 2005: Minutes to Midnight, Australian Centre for Photography, Sydney.
- 2005: Colour Work, Stills Gallery, Sydney.
- 2006: Minutes to Midnight, Wollongong City Gallery
- 2007: Welcome to Nowhere, Stills Gallery, Sydney. Part of New Blood, Magnum Photos 60th anniversary exhibition. With Antoine D'Agata, Jonas Bendiksen, Mark Power and Alec Soth.
- 2008: Christmas Tree Bucket, Stills Gallery, Sydney.
- 2009: Minutes to Midnight, Children's Art Gallery, National Gallery of Australia.
- 2009: Please step quietly everyone can hear you, Sydney Opera House.
- 2010: Survey Show, Hugo Michell Gallery, Adelaide.
- 2013: To the Sea with Narelle Autio, Hugo Michell Gallery, Adelaide.
- 2013: The Christmas Tree Bucket, National Gallery of Australia, 20 December 2013 – 23 February 2014.
- 2014: The Camera is God, The 2014 Adelaide Biennial of Australian Art: Dark Heart, Art Gallery of South Australia, Adelaide.
- 2014: The Camera is God, Hugo Michell Gallery, Adelaide.
- 2015: The Black Rose, Art Gallery of South Australia, Adelaide, 14 March – 10 May 2015. Part of the 2015 Adelaide Festival.
- The Crimson Line, Hugo Michell Gallery, 31 October – 23 November 2019

== Collections ==
Parke's work is held in the following public collections:

- National Gallery of Australia, Canberra
- National Gallery of Victoria, Melbourne: 7 prints (as of November 2018)
- National Library of Australia
- Australian National Maritime Museum, Sydney
- Museum of Contemporary Art, Sydney: 1 print (as of November 2018)
- University of Sydney Union, University of Sydney, Sydney
