= Format International Photography Festival =

Format International Photography Festival (stylised as FORMAT) is a biennial photography festival held in Derby, UK that. It was established in 2004 and takes place in March in various venues in Derby including Quad, University of Derby, Derby Museum and Art Gallery, Derwent Valley Mills, Market Place and in nearby cities.

Format comprises "a year-round programme of international commissions, open calls, residencies, conferences and collaborations". Though it exhibits some work by established photographers, it is predominantly a platform for emerging photography. In 2010 The Guardian called it "the UK's leading photography festival".

Format24 will take place 16 March – 30 July 2024.

== Organisation ==
Format was established in 2004 by Louise Clements and Mike Brown, and built on the legacy of the past Derby Photography Festivals. It is organised by QUAD in partnership with the University of Derby. It was Directed by Co-Founder Louise Clements also known as Louise Fedotov-Clements from 2004–2022; in 2017 it was directed by Monica Allende.

== Episodes ==
=== 2006 – Format06 ===
The theme was "Transform" and it took place in September/October.

Included work by Adam Broomberg and Oliver Chanarin.

=== 2009 – Format09 ===
The theme was "Photocinema".

Included work by Aaron Schuman and Wim Wenders.

=== 2011 – Format11 ===
The theme was "Right Here, Right Now: Exposures from the Public Realm"—street photography.

Included work by Giacomo Brunelli, Raymond Depardon, Bruce Gilden, Joel Meyerowitz, Chris Steele-Perkins, Raghu Rai, Alex Webb, Zhang Xiao, and 60 works by street photography collective In-Public including Nick Turpin.

Speakers at the opening weekend included Bruce Gilden, Nate Larson, John Maloof on Vivian Maier, Chris Steele-Perkins, Mark Sealy, Amy Stein, Nick Turpin, Michael Wolf and Joel Meyerowitz.

=== 2013 – Format13 ===
The theme and subtitle was "Factory: Mass Production". The festival had two categories: "Focus", which was curated, and "Exposure", "comprising work selected from an open submission programme."

Included work by Ken Grant, Erik Kessels, and Archive of Modern Conflict.

=== 2014 – Format14 ===
Included work by Zhang Xiao.

=== 2015 – Format15 ===
The theme was "evidence" and it was directed by Louise Clements.

Included work by Larry Sultan and Mike Mandel (Evidence).

=== 2016 – Format16 ===
An off-year episode. The theme was called "reGeneration3" and it was curated by the Musée de l'Élysée (Lausanne, Switzerland).

Included "work by some 50 students of 25 different nationalities and 40 art institutions".

=== 2017 – Format17 ===
The theme was "Habitat"—"landscape, environment, migration, digital worlds, ideas of home and displacement, conflict and regeneration". The headline exhibition explored the Anthropocene.

Included work by David Moore (his play The Lisa and John Slideshow), Lisa Barnard, Sohrab Hura, Ursula Biemann, John Maclean, Tom Hunter and from the W. W. Winter studio in Derby.

The Format Conference included a talk by Martin Parr.

=== 2018 – Format18 ===
Included work by Mark Neville (Displaced Ukrainians and Battle Against Stigma).

== See also ==
- Brighton Photo Biennial
- Look Photo Biennial
