= Jonathan Glancey =

British architectural critic and writer

- Education: Magdalen College
- Occupation: Journalist

Jonathan Glancey, FRIBA is an architectural critic and writer who was the architecture and design editor at The Guardian, a position he held from 1997 to February 2012. He previously held the same post at The Independent. He also has been involved with the architecture magazines Building Design, Architectural Review, The Architect and Blueprint. He is an honorary fellow of the Royal Institute of British Architects, RIBA.

Following in the footsteps of Ian Nairn he made a series of four films, Outrage Revisited (2010) on the banality of Britain's postwar buildings.

Currently he reports on architecture and design for the website BBC Culture, and he has written articles about Andrea Palladio, the noted Renaissance architect active chiefly in Venice, whose classically influenced style became known as 'Palladianism'.

== Education ==
Glancey attended St Benedict's School in Ealing, West London and read Philosophy, Politics and Economics at Magdalen College, Oxford.

== Books by Glancey ==
- New British architecture (London: Thames and Hudson, 1989) ISBN 0-500-34107-9
- Pillar Boxes (London: Chatto & Windus, 1989) ISBN 0-7011-3447-X
- 20th Century Architecture: The Structures That Shaped the Century (London: Carlton, 1998) ISBN 1-85868-519-2
- The Story of Architecture (London; New York: Dorling Kindersley, 2000) ISBN 0-7513-4881-3
- London: Bread and Circuses (London: Verso Books, 2001) ISBN 1-85984-645-9
- The Train: A Photographic History (London: Carlton, 2004) ISBN 978-1-84732-465-8
- John Betjeman on Trains (London: Methuen, 2006) ISBN 978-0-413-77612-9
- Spitfire: The Biography, 2006
- John Betjeman on Churches (London: Methuen, 2007) ISBN 978-0-413-77651-8
- Tornado: 21st Century Steam (London: Books on Track, 2010) ISBN 978-0-9566770-0-6
- Nagaland: A journey to India's forgotten frontier, April 2011
- Giants of Steam (London: Atlantic Books, 2012) ISBN 978-184354-769-3
- Harrier: The Biography (London: Atlantic Books, 2013) ISBN 978-1-84354-891-1
- Concorde: The Rise and Fall of the Supersonic Airliner (London: Atlantic Books, October 2015) ISBN 978-1-78239-107-4
- What's So Great About the Eiffel Tower? (London: Laurence King Publishing, February 2017) ISBN 978-1-78067-919-8
- Wings Over Water: The Story of the World's Greatest Air Race and the Birth of the Spitfire (London: Atlantic Books, 2020) ISBN 978-1-78649-419-1
- The Journey Matters (London: Atlantic Books, 2019) ISBN 978-1-78649-416-0
- Logomotive: Railroad Graphics and The American Dream (London: Sheldrake Press, 2020) ISBN 978-1-873329-50-4
