= Dewi Lewis =

Welsh book publisher

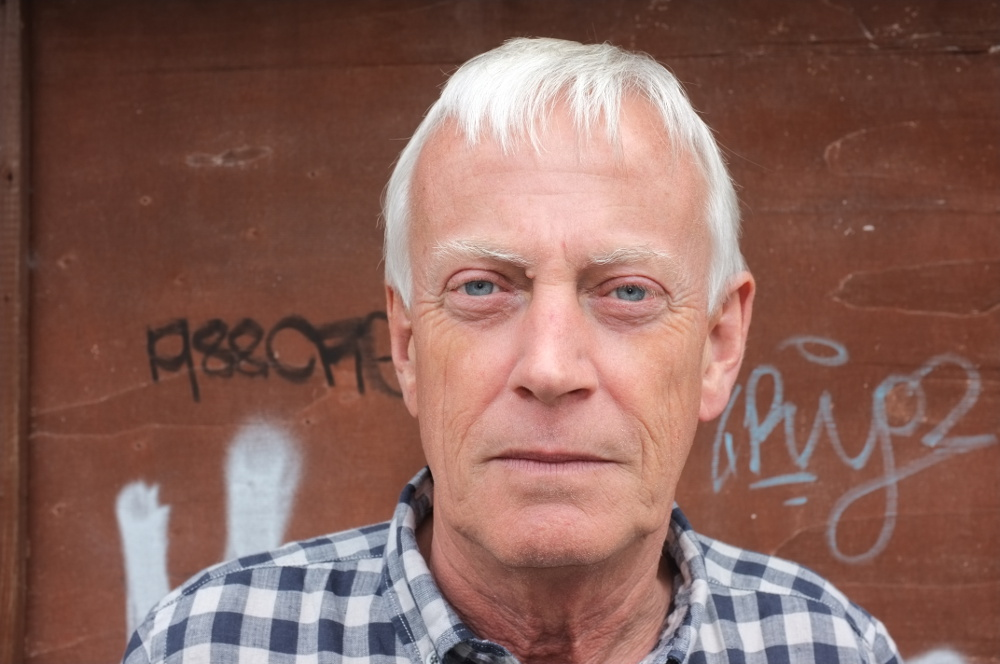
- Dewi Lewis, 2014
- Born: Denbigh, Wales
- Occupations: Publisher and curator of photography

Dewi Lewis is a British publisher and curator of photography.

== Career ==
In 1975, Lewis was the founding director of the Bury Metropolitan Arts Association which operates the Met.

Lewis also founded and was the first director of Cornerhouse, an arts centre in Manchester, England. He ran the organisation until 1994 when he left to establish Dewi Lewis Publishing. In 2015 Cornerhouse merged with the Library Theatre Company to create a new venue 'Home'. .[

Lewis was made an Honorary Fellow of the Royal Photographic Society in 2004 and was awarded the Society’s inaugural RPS Award for Outstanding Service to Photography in 2009. In 2012, the Kraszna-Krausz Foundation presented him with an award for Outstanding Contribution to Photography Publishing.

Lewis has acted as a jury member for several major competitions and as a portfolio reviewer at international photography events including Fotofest and Review Santa Fe (both USA), Lodz Festival (Poland) and PHotoEspaña (Spain). He was a ‘Master’ for the 2009, 2010 and 2011 World Press Photo Joop Swart Masterclasses. Along with his own book, Publishing Photography (1992), he writes occasional texts on photography and has curated exhibitions including a survey show of the British magazine Picture Post for the 2010 Atri Festival.

== Dewi Lewis Publishing ==
In 1994 Lewis established Dewi Lewis Publishing, a publisher of photobooks run by Lewis and his wife Caroline Warhurst from their home in Manchester.

Photographers whose books have been published by Dewi Lewis Publishing include Bruce Gilden William Klein, Sirkka-Liisa Konttinen, Sergio Larrain, Simon Norfolk, Martin Parr, and Simon Roberts. Lewis has worked in close collaboration with a number of European publishers and was a founding member of the European Publishers Award for Photography, which was established in 1994 and ran until 2015.

In 2014 Dewi Lewis Publishing won PhotoEspaña's Outstanding Publishing House of the Year award.

== Personal life ==
Lewis was born in Denbigh, North Wales and brought up in Rhyl.

== Book by Lewis ==
- Publishing Photography. Manchester: Cornerhouse, 1992. ISBN 9780948797811.
