= List of people who achieved posthumous recognition =

People that became famous after their death

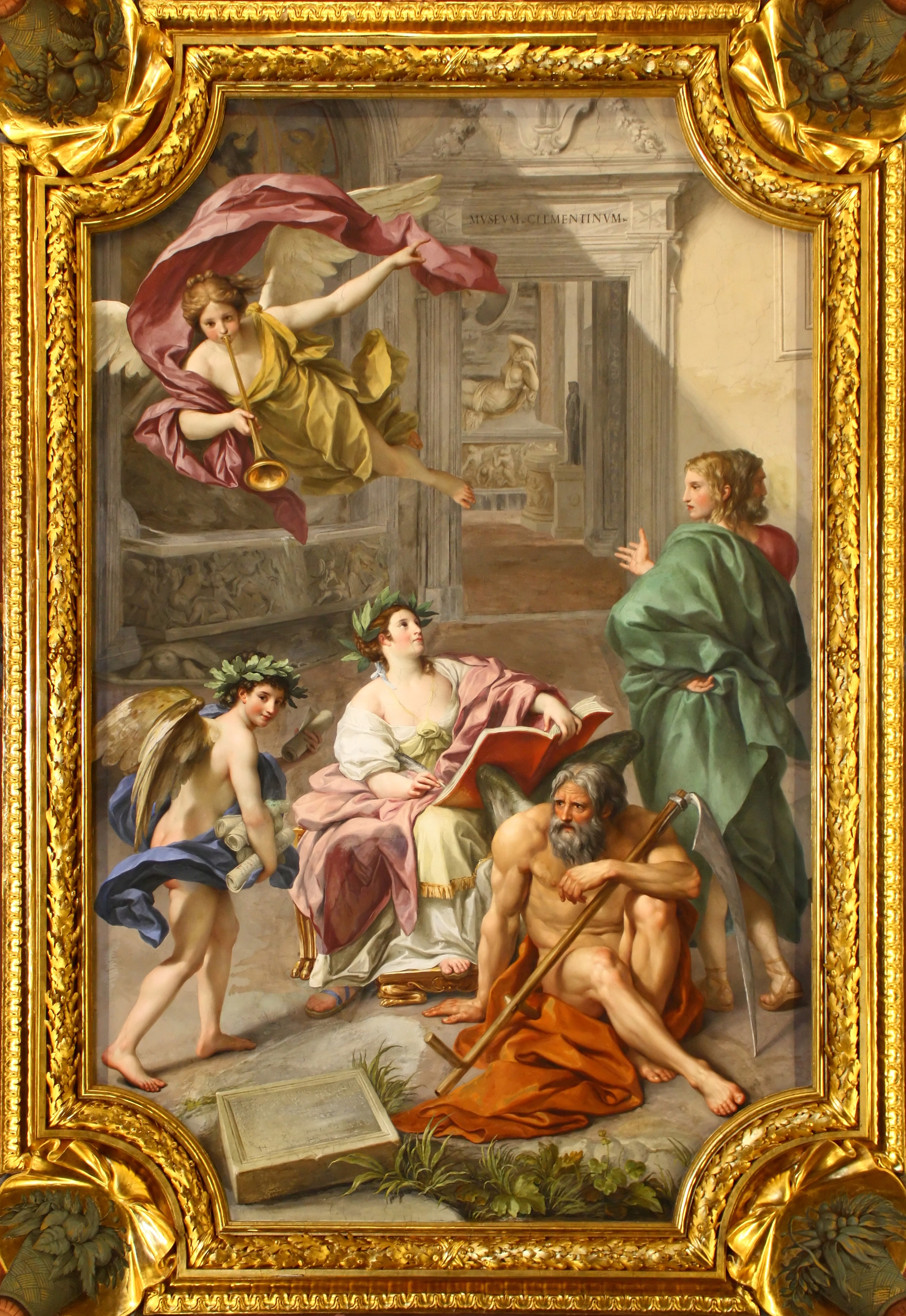
The Triumph of History over Time (1772), by Anton Raphael Mengs; an allegory often interpreted as history ultimately judging and honouring individuals well past their own lifetimes

This article is a chronological list of people who achieved posthumous recognition, which is the fame, honor, or critical breakthrough bestowed upon them only after their death. The phenomenon appears in many fields, including arts, literature and science, and has been described in cultural and historical studies.

The list is organized chronologically by year of birth. Please add to this list people who meet all of the following criteria:

- People who had limited or small recognition in their lifetime, After their death, their work or actions received a clear growth in recognition through various honors such as prizes, memorials, or institutions named after them.
- Reliable secondary sources, stating that the person became famous only after their death or that their work, even if initially famous, was forgotten but later rediscovered.

== Science ==
Name	Life	Field	Nature of work	Main recognition period - posthumous recognition	Sources on posthumous recognition
John Harrison	1693 - 1776	Science	English self-taught clockmaker and carpenter who invented the marine chronometer and was rewarded for it under the Longitude Act. During his lifetime, he was mostly looked down upon by the scientific community and the Board of Longitude, and was regarded as absurd.	He died after decades of bureaucratic struggles with academic astronomers. It was only 250 years later, after his marine chronometers became the global standard for navigation and saved countless lives and vessels at sea, that he was recognized as a genius who enabled safe world exploration. His original clocks are now presented as treasures in the Royal Observatory at Greenwich	
Gregor Mendel	1822 - 1884	Science	An Austrian abbot who discovered the basic principles of genetic heredity through persistent and methodic experiments in his monastery's garden on garden pea. Mendel published his work in 1866 and it was misunderstood by the scientific community that was exposed to his work in his lifetime, nevertheless before he died Mendel expressed his belief that my time will come.	Mendel's work was rediscovered in 1900 by three independent scientists: Hugo De Vries, Carl Correns and Erich Von Tschermak that came to realise that Mendel had already discovered the foundation of modern genetics before them. Mendel is now known as the "father of genetics".	
Nikola Tesla	1856 - 1943	Science, Technology	Electrical engineer and the inventor of the Radio, widely known for developing alternating current power (AC) systems	Tesla's reputation waned in his later years, and he died a poor man. Only decades after his death was his work rediscovered, causing him to be recognised as a key figure in the history of electricity. In 1943, after his death, a court ruling in the United States cancelled Guglielmo Marconi's patent on the radio, thereby recognising Tesla as its inventor. In 1960, in his honor, the magnetic flux density was named after him.	
Alfred Wegener	1880 - 1930	natural sciences	A German meteorological pioneer and polar explorer, who came up with the theory of continental drift in 1912. According to Wegener, all the continents were once joined in a single giant landmass, which he referred to as Pangaea, until the ocean floor started to drift apart over millions of years.	Wegener lacked the data to form the part in his theory that could identify the force that has such power over the earth's movement. Most geologists at the time fiercely objected to the idea that contradicted everything they knew, so they ridiculed him. Wegener died in 1930 during a storm while on an expedition to Greenland to study the great ice cap and collect evidence to support his theory, and he never lived to see his theory accepted. Only in the 1950s and 1960s did scientists, after they discovered tectonic plates movement, finally realize that he was right. Today he is considered a key figure in modern geology.	
Srinivasa Ramanujan	1887 - 1920	Mathematics	A self-taught Indian mathematician who lived in poverty. With almost no formal training, he formulated about 3,900 mathematical results and equations on his own, many of which were so advanced that English mathematicians at first thought they were fraudulent.	Ramanujan died at age 32, ignored by many in the scientific world. It took decades for mathematicians to fully grasp the complexity of his work. Ramanujan claimed that many of the same formulas that are now being used in modern physics to study Black holes and quantum theory were delivered to him in his dreams from Namagiri Mahalakshmi, a Hindu goddess. Today he is celebrated as one of the greatest mathematical geniuses in history, and his birthday in India is celebrated as National Mathematics Day.	
Alice Ball	1892 - 1916	Science, Chemistry	African American chemist who developed what is now known as the Ball Method. At the age of 23, she isolated the ester compounds, by freezing the oil's fatty acids, which solidified the chaulmoogra oil, turning the molecules of oil into a successful injectable treatment for Hansen's disease (leprosy). Ball died at the age of 24 after an accident in the lab, without ever seeing the tremendous impact of her discovery, which saved thousands of people from isolation.	After her death, the president of her college, Arthur Dean, published her research under his own name, naming it the "Dean Method", without giving Ball any credit. For over 50 years the world believed he was the inventor, while Ball's name was erased from history. Only in the 1970s did professors at the University of Hawaiʻi at Mānoa search through old records and archives and discover the truth about who invented the treatment. Today Ball is recognized for her great contribution. In 2000 Hawaii declared February 29 to be "Alice Ball Day".	

== Literature & Poetry ==
Name	Life	Field	Nature of work	Main recognition period - posthumous recognition	Sources on posthumous recognition
Herman Melville	1819 - 1891	Literature	American writer of novels, short stories, and poetry	Melville's first two novels, Typee and Omoo, both based on his experiences as a sailor, were commercial successes, but his subsequent more profound works, such as Moby-Dick, were not. He was forgotten and took a job as a customs inspector, writing poetry on the side. The centennial of Melville's birth in 1919 coincided with a renewed interest in his writings known as the Melville revival, during which his work experienced a significant critical reassessment. The revival included the discovery and 1924 publication of the manuscript of his novella, Billy Budd, Sailor.	
Emily Dickinson	1830 - 1886	Poetry	American poet who wrote nearly 1,800 poems, most of them unpublished and unknown during her lifetime	Dickinson came to be recognised as one of the major poets in American literature after her death, in 1890 when her manuscripts were discovered and published by her sister Lavinia Dickinson.	
Franz Kafka	1883 - 1924	Literature	German language Bohemian writer, published only a small amount of his work and during his life remained unknown, outside of small circles.	In 1922 Kafka left written instructions to his friend Max Brod to burn his manuscripts, which included three unfinished novels. After Kafka's death in 1924, Brod, who was his literary executor, ignored Kafka's instructions and instead edited and published Kafka's novels as The Castle, The Trial and America, which led to Kafka's posthumous recognition as one of the most important writers of the 20th century.	

== Art ==
Name	Life	Field	Nature of work	Main recognition period - posthumous recognition	Sources on posthumous recognition
Paul Gauguin	1848 - 1903	Painting	French Post-Impressionist and modernist who abandoned his wife, four children, and a career as a stockbroker to paint, eventually dying in poverty and sickness in the Marquesas Islands.	In 1906, three years after his death, when a massive retrospective exhibition of 200 of his works was held at the Salon d'Automne in Paris. The exhibition surprised and shocked the art world and had a deep impact on Pablo Picasso and Henri Matisse, who were inspired by Gauguin's primitive style and bold vibrant colorful art. This exhibition turned him from a relatively unknown artist into a main figure of modern art history.	
Vincent Van Gogh	1853 - 1890	Painting	Dutch Post-Impressionist painter who sold very few works and received little recognition during his lifetime.	Only after Van Gogh's death, when his brother's wife Johanna van Gogh Bonger worked tirelessly to promote his art, did his paintings gain wide critical acceptance and popularity, causing him to be considered one of the greatest artists in the history of Western art.	
Vivian Maier	1926 - 2009	Photography	American street photographer who worked as a nanny in Chicago and New York. During her lifetime, she spent her days off with her Rolleiflex camera, taking pictures, mainly of people and the city, but never showed them to anyone.	Maier died in 2009 in poverty and without knowing that her work had been discovered, leaving behind more than 100,000 negatives. In 2007, at a storage locker auction, a local historian named John Maloof bought a box of her negatives for $400, because the rent on her storage space hadn't been paid. By 2009, when Maloof started to explore the mysterious photographer and discover the artistic value of the negatives, Vivian had passed away. Maloof started collecting the rest of the sold negatives. Today Maier is widely recognized as one of the greatest street photographers of the 20th century, and her work is exhibited around the globe.	

== Music ==
Name	Life	Field	Nature of work	Main recognition period - posthumous recognition	Sources on posthumous recognition
Johann Sebastian Bach	1685 - 1750	Musical composition	German composer and musician of the Baroque period, during his lifetime he was regarded more as a skilled organist than a major composer.	After Bach's death, his music was viewed as old-fashioned and infrequently performed. Only with the Bach revival in the 19th century, which began with Felix Mendelssohn's 1829 performance of the St Matthew Passion, did he become renowned as one of the greatest composers of all time.	
Franz Schubert	1797-1828	Musical composition	Austrian composer of the late Classical and early Romantic eras. Schubert composed more than 600 Lieder, seven complete symphonies, sacred music, operas, incidental music, and a large body of piano and chamber music.	During his lifetime, Schubert was best known for small scale works such as Lieder, but "he increasingly composed ambitious dramatic, religious, keyboard, chamber, and orchestral works.... His contemporaries knew only a few of these 'higher' compositions; hence the discrepancy between Schubert's lived and posthumous fame."	
Nick Drake	1948 - 1974	Music	British musician, singer, and songwriter who was a sensitive spirit and suffered from depression. He recorded three albums — Five Leaves Left, Bryter Layter, and Pink Moon — but because he lacked the ability to perform in public or give interviews, his music didn't sell, and he was almost unknown to the general public.	Drake died in 1974 from an overdose of antidepressants, feeling that he was a failure, and his music was forgotten. His fame started to grow years after his death, in 1999 when his song "Pink Moon" was used in a Volkswagen TV commercial. This ad introduced his music to millions of people and turned him into a cult icon. Today he is considered one of the most influential folk artists of his time.	

== See also ==
- Posthumous fame of Vincent van Gogh
- Posthumous fame of El Greco
- Reception of Johann Sebastian Bach's music – History of musical appreciation
- Posthumous award – Award granted after death
- Posthumous publication – Publishing a work after the creator's death
