= Correns (surname) =

Correns is a surname. Notable people with the surname include:

- Carl Correns (1864–1933), German botanist and geneticist
- Carl Wilhelm Correns (1893–1980), German mineralogist
- Erich Correns (artist) (1821–1877), German portrait painter and lithographer
- Erich Correns (chemist) (1896–1981), German chemist and politician

== See also ==
- Corren, another surname
