= Känslor säljer / Miljonär =

Studio album by Solen
- Released: 24 March 2017
- Genre: Pop rock
- Length: 34:31
- Label: Playground Music
- Producer: Ulf Ivarsson

Solen chronology
Till dom som bryr sig (2014)	Känslor säljer / Miljonär (2017)	Totalmusik (2021)

Singles from Känslor säljer / Miljonär
- 1. "Miljonär"; 2. "Olof, kära Olof"

Professional ratings
Review scores
Source	Rating
Corren	4/5 stars
Gaffa	5/6 stars

Känslor säljer / Miljonär is the third studio album by Swedish indie pop band Solen. It was released on 24 March 2017. The album was nominated for the 2018 Grammis Award for "Best Rock" album.

== Track listing ==
All lyrics are written by Solen; all music is composed by Solen

Känslor säljer / Miljonär track listing
No.	Title	Length
1.	"Stäng igen stan" (Shut Down Town)	4:18
2.	"Miljonär" (Millionaire)	3:24
3.	"Sämst i världen" (Worst in the World)	4:39
4.	"Olof, kära Olof" (Olof, Dear Olof)	3:13
5.	"Acne"	3:48
6.	"Leonore"	2:25
7.	"Känslor säljer" (Feelings Sell)	3:24
8.	"Det bästa jag gjort" (The Best I've Done)	2:22
9.	"Alicia"	1:55
10.	"Harpun" (Harpoon)	4:58

== Personnel ==
=== Solen ===
- Erik Hillborg – lead vocals, guitars
- Nils Dahlqvist – bass, keyboards
- Gustav Karlsson – guitars
- Johan Kilström – keyboards, guitars, backing vocals
- Olle Darmell – drums

=== Additional musicians ===
- Pontus Wiklund – piano on track 3, 7

=== Technical ===
- Ulf Ivarsson – producer

== Charts ==
Chart performance for Känslor säljer / Miljonär
Chart (2007)	Peak position
Swedish Albums (Sverigetopplistan)	11
