= Angelo Rizzuto =

American photographer

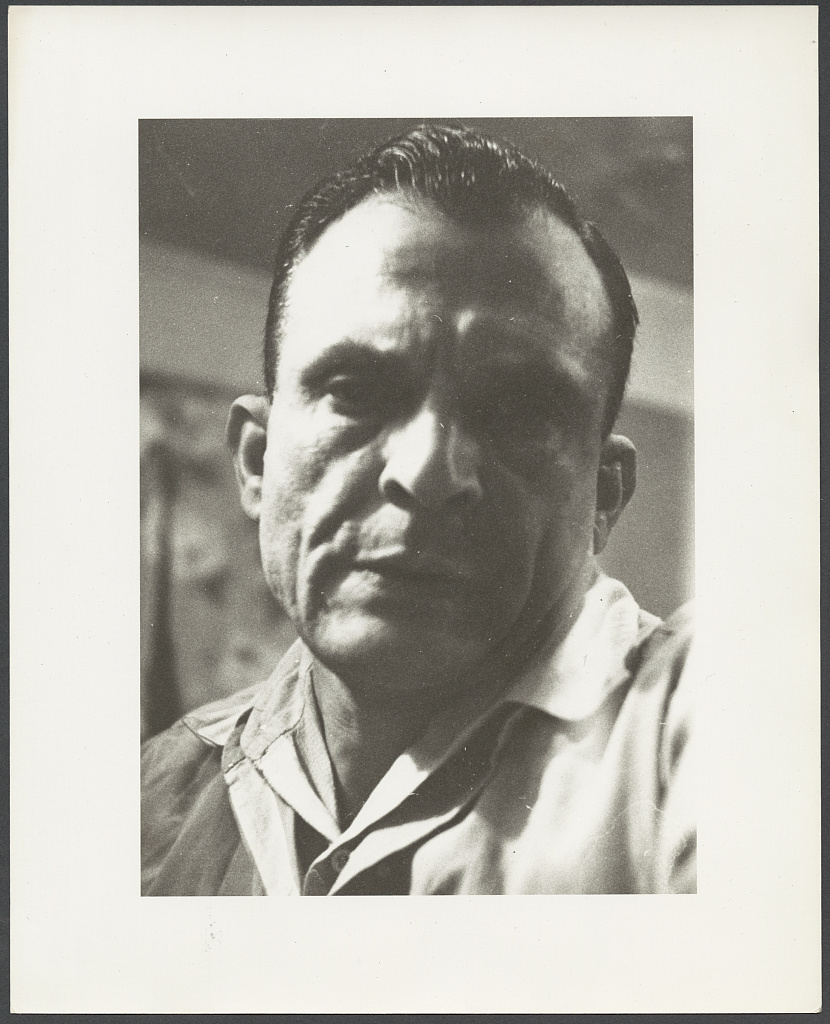
- Born: Angelo Antonio Rizzuto; December 19, 1906; Deadwood, South Dakota, U.S.
- Died: 1967 (aged 60–61); New York City, U.S.
- Education: Wittenberg College; Harvard Law School (attended)
- Occupation: Street photographer

Angelo Antonio Rizzuto (December 19, 1906 – 1967) was an American photographer who worked in Manhattan from 1952 until his death. His street photography opus of 60,000 images lay in file cabinets unviewed until 2001.

== Early life ==
Rizzuto grew up in Omaha, Nebraska. His parents were Sicilian immigrants Francesca (née Scarpino) and Antonio Rizzuto; Francesca had two sons from a previous relationship, Sam and Frank. He graduated from Wittenberg College in Ohio in 1931. He attended Harvard Law School in the mid-1930s. His father had a successful construction business, but when he died Rizzuto and his brothers fought over the estate, which drove Rizzuto to a suicide attempt in 1941, after which he was temporarily committed to a sanatorium.

After drifting around the country, working odd jobs, and enlisting and being medically discharged from the military, he settled in Manhattan where he called himself Anthony Angel. For many years he was paranoid and delusional, tormented by the belief that he was the victim of a global conspiracy of communists, perverts and Jews. He lived in Manhattan, in a brownstone which he owned on 51st Street between 1st and 2nd Avenues which he is believed to have purchased with an inheritance after his brother died. He developed his photographs on the second floor of his home.

Rizzuto was somewhat friendly with a next-door neighbor, Peter Sutherland, whom Rizzuto picked to be the executor of his will. Sutherland refused, and when Rizzuto died, his will was executed by James Montgomery, a lawyer. The will was contested by his brother Sam, who claimed that Angelo lacked "testamentary capacity". Sam died before the case could be settled. His estate received one quarter of Angelo's estate and the Library of Congress received the rest.

== Career ==
Every day at 2 p.m. between May 1952 and June 1964 (excepting January through July 1960), Rizzuto would venture out with a camera to record images for what was to be a vast encyclopedic kaleidoscope of Manhattan, a book to be called Little Old New York. He was otherwise not seen outside of his apartment.

Rizzuto photographed New York's inhabitants. Every roll of film after 1953 ended with a portrait of himself, often reflecting the angles and points of view of the cityscapes which precede them on the camera roll. His images include images of the city, compassionate-seeming photographs of children and animals, confrontational pictures of angry women, as well as anguished self-portraits. He used bulk roll film and might have used multiple cameras during a specific day's shooting. The contact sheets he printed were often in thematic, rather than chronological, order. He would sometimes use a copy stand and photograph other printed material.

== Library of Congress ==
Before he died, knowing that he would not live to see his intention realized, Rizzuto bequeathed 60,000 photographs and the proceeds from the sale of his house, about $50,000, to the Library of Congress, on the condition that the library publish a book of his work. The library published a book described by photographic historian Michael Lesy as "bound with staples, illustrated with perhaps 60 indifferently printed reproductions of the dead man’s pictures." The bulk of the money he bequeathed went to acquire works by Diane Arbus and other notable photographers. Lesy first encountered these images in 1973 while looking for photographs of the 1950s in the Library of Congress's Prints and Photographs division. He later compiled them into a longer book entitled Angel’s World: The New York Photographs of Angelo Rizzuto. Rizzuto's collection of images in the Library of Congress is still largely undigitized; as of late 2021, 1400 images are available online.

The collection is described in a Library of Congress blog post as "carefully organized... by year, month, and date. The collection contains four kinds of material: (1) Contact sheets, 1952-1964, 10×10 inches... they represent all of the images in the negatives (2) Prints for an unpublished book called “Little Old New York,” 8×10 inches—all digitized and available online (3) Booklets and typescripts, filed in a supplemental archive (4) Film negatives, 1949–1967, 35mm and 120-size in 2.25 x 3.25 inches—preserved in cold storage"

The Library has encountered issues processing the collection because much of the material went undescribed by Rizzuto during his lifetime.

== See also ==
- Vivian Maier
