= Solen =

Solen may refer to:

- Solen, Ancient Greek name for the Thamirabarani River
- Solen, North Dakota
- Solen (bivalve), a genus of molluscs in family Solenidae
- Solen (ship), a Swedish galleon
- Solen Désert-Mariller (born 1982), French sprinter
- Solen (band), Swedish indie pop band
- Solen ("The Sun"), 1911 painting by Edvard Munch

== See also ==
- Sølen, mountain in Norway
