= Posthumous fame of El Greco =

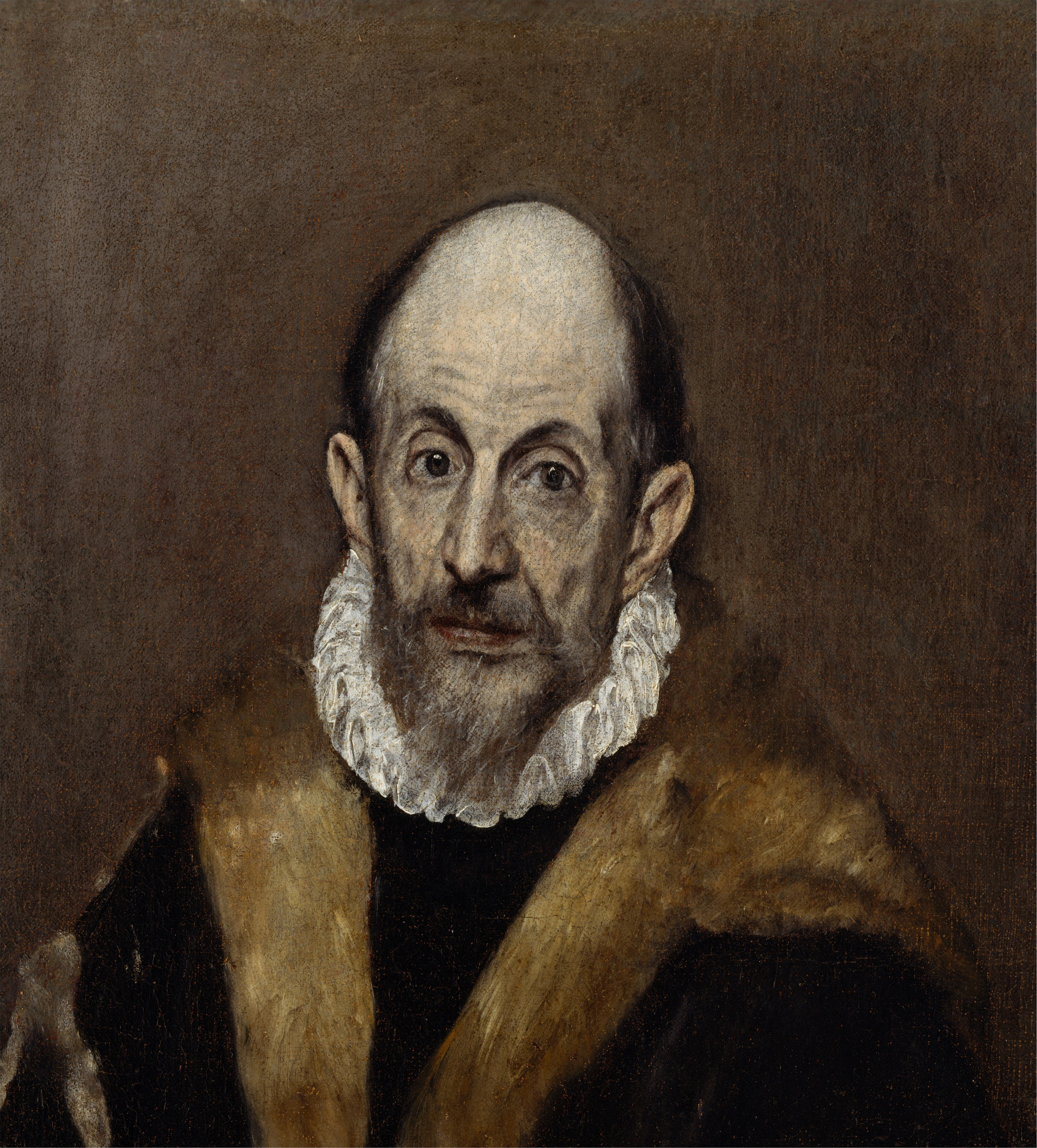
Portrait of An Old Man (so called self-portrait of El Greco, circa 1595–1600, oil on canvas, 52.7 x 46.7 cm, The Metropolitan Museum of Art, New York City, United States)

Doménikos Theotokópoulos, known as El Greco (Castilian for "The Greek") (1541 – April 7, 1614), was a prominent painter, sculptor and architect of the Spanish Renaissance, whose dramatic and expressionistic style was met with puzzlement by his contemporaries but found appreciation in the 20th century.

== Years of obscurity ==
El Greco was disdained by the immediate generations after his death because his work was opposed in many respects to the principles of the early baroque style, which came to the fore near the beginning of the 17th century and soon supplanted the last surviving traits of 16th-century Mannerism. El Greco was deemed incomprehensible and had no important followers. Only his son and a few unknown painters produced weak copies of his works. Late 17th- and early 18th-century Spanish commentators praised his skill but criticized his antinaturalistic style and his complex iconography. Some of these commentators, such as Acislo Antonio Palomino de Castro y Velasco and Ceán Bermúdez described his mature work as "contemptible", "ridiculous" and "worthy of scorn".

The views of Palomino and Bermúdez were frequently repeated in Spanish historiography, adorned with terms such as "strange", "queer", "original", "eccentric" and "odd". The phrase "sunk in eccentricity", often encountered in such texts, in time developed into "madness".

== Re-invention of El Greco (19th century) ==
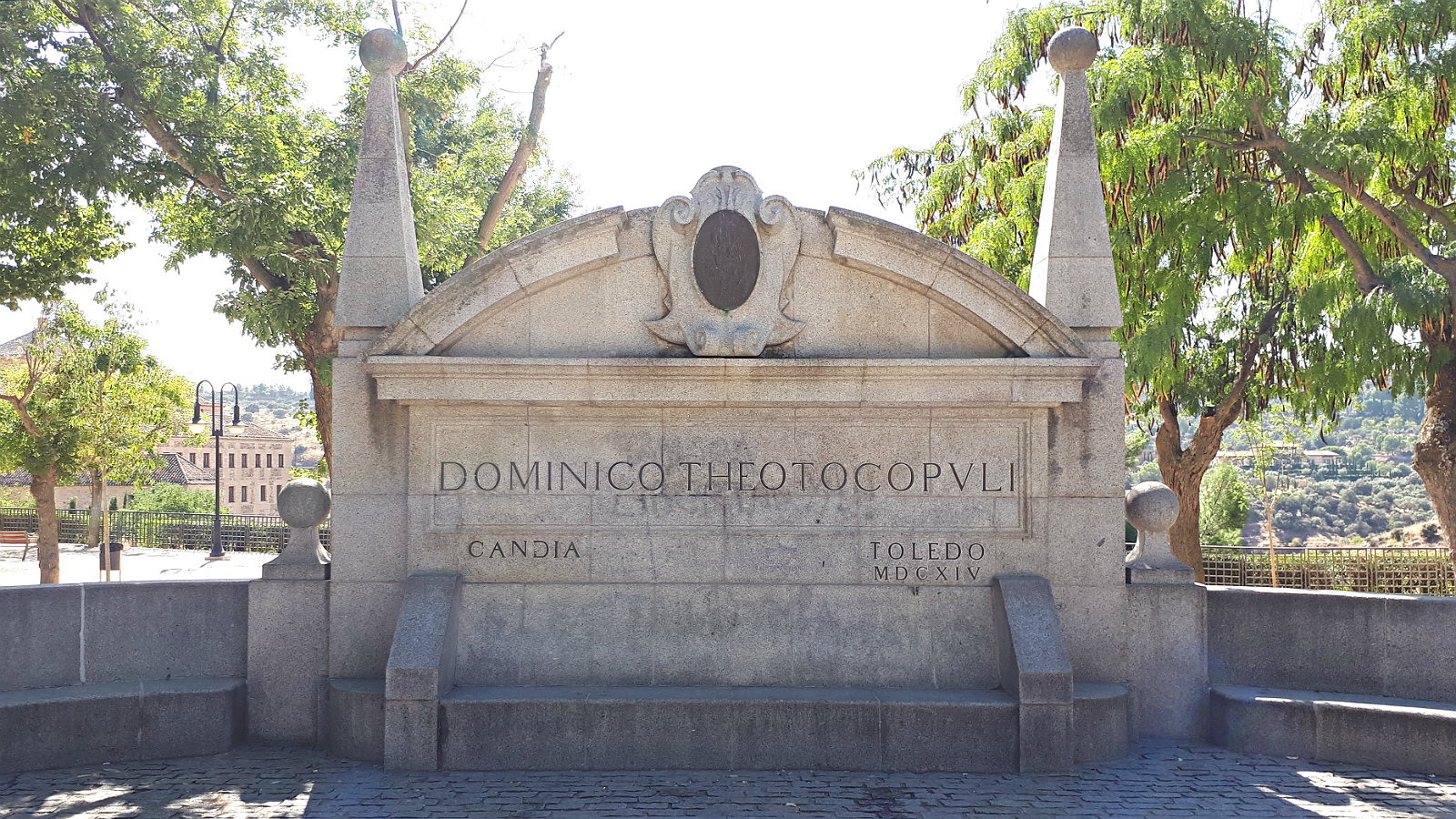
Monument commemorating El Greco opposite the Museo del Greco in Toledo.

In 1838 the Spanish Museum of King Louis-Philippe was inaugurated at the Louvre. In 1835 Louis-Philippe had sent Baron Isidore Justin Séverin Taylor to Spain to purchase, on his account, a representative group of works from the Spanish School. Taylor enriched the king's collection with nine paintings by El Greco: four with religious motifs, four portraits, and an Evangelist. Among 450 paintings by 85 Spanish painters, the French public was able to see works of El Greco for the first time. During this period the idea that El Greco represented the beginning of the Spanish School was first formulated. In 1838 the A of Spanish painting was already El Greco while the Z was Goya. Nevertheless, Murillo, Velázquez, Ribera, Cano and Zurbarán were the painters to whom critics, artists and public referred reacted favorably to the Spanish Museum. Only a small élite preferred El Greco and Goya.

With the arrival of romanticism, El Greco's works were examined anew. To Théophile Gautier, a French poet, dramatist, novelist, journalist, and literary critic, El Greco was the precursor of the European Romantic movement in all its craving for the strange and the extreme. Gautier would esteem and admire the later technique of El Greco, connecting him to art contemporary with himself: "The best works of his second period resemble the romantic paintings of a great deal". The critic Zacharie Astruc and the scholar Paul Lefort helped to promote a widespread revival of interest in his painting.

It was precisely then that the myth of El Greco's madness came into being. The second Romantic generation, the adherents of the theory of art for art's sake, were in search of the fantastic and the rare, whatever eluded norms and limitations, what resisted interpretation and was unique. Consequently, madness was re-evaluated. The myth of El Greco's madness came in two versions. On the one hand, Théophile Gautier believed that El Greco went mad from excessive artistic sensitivity. On the other hand, the public and the critics would not possess the ideological criteria of Gautier and would retain the image of El Greco as a "mad painter" and, therefore, his "maddest" paintings were not admired but considered to be historical documents proving his "madness". During the operation of the Spanish Museum, El Greco became the ideal romantic hero, the gifted, the misunderstood, the marginal, the one who lost his reason because of the scorn of his contemporaries. The critics of Courrier Français and La Presse would retain the image of El Greco as a "mad painter".

In 1867, Paul Lefort, an expert on Spanish painting, dedicated an eight-page article to El Greco with engravings of four works. In this article, Lefort extols El Greco, refuting the all-powerful commonplace of his "madness" and proclaiming him the founder of the Spanish School. Between 1860–1880 the archival research reveals some new important documents, such as a letter written by the Croatian miniaturist, Giulio Clovio, who characterized El Greco as "a rare talent in painting". In the 1890s, Spanish painters living in Paris adopted him as their guide and mentor. During this period, however, El Greco continued to still be a matter for the "happy few". Lefort was opposed to distinguished critics such as Charles Blanc and Louis Viardot, whose hostile comments on El Greco were a powerful commonplace. Therefore, Lefort wrote an article recommending the repossession of El Greco by the historians.

== Re-evaluation of El Greco (20th century) ==
It was a great moment. A pure righteous conscience stood on one tray of the balance, an empire on the other, and it was you, man's conscience, that tipped the scales. This conscience will be able to stand before the Lord as the Last Judgement and not be judged. It will judge, because human dignity, purity and valor fill even God with terror ... Art is not submission and rules, but a demon which smashes the moulds ... Greco's inner-archangel's breast had thrust him on savage freedom's single hope, this world's most excellent garret.

— Nikos Kazantzakis, Report to Greco

In 1908, art historian Manuel Bartolomé Cossío published the first comprehensive catalogue of El Greco's works. According to Foundoulaki, "in this book El Greco is not established as the founder of the Spanish School, but as the conveyor of Spanish soul par excellence". The same year Julius Meier-Graefe, a scholar of French Impressionism, travelled in Spain and recorded his experiences in The Spanische Reise, the first book which established El Greco as a great painter of the past. In El Greco's work, Meier-Graefe, who regarded El Greco as an utterly contemporary painter, found foreshadowings of modernity. These are the words Meier-Graefe used to describe El Greco's impact on the artistic movements of his time:

"As I was climbing the narrow, rain-slicked lane

-nearly three hundred years have gone by-
I felt myself seized by the hand of a Powerful Friend
and indeed I came to see myself lifted on the two
enormous wings of Doménicos up to his skies

which this time were full of
orange trees and water speaking of the homeland."

–Odysseas Elytis, Diary of an Unseen April

"He [El Greco] has discovered a realm of new possibilities. Not even he, himself, was able to exhaust them. All the generations that follow after him live in his realm. There is a greater difference between him and Titian, his master, than between him and Renoir or Cézanne. Nevertheless, Renoir and Cézanne are masters of impeccable originality because it is not possible to avail yourself of El Greco's language, if in using it, it is not invented again and again, by the user."

To the Blaue Reiter group in Munich in 1912, El Greco typified that mystical inner construction that it was the task of their generation to rediscover. Two years after the publication of Cossío's catalog, in 1910, another art historian, Borja de San Román, published his own research about El Greco, which included 88 new documents, among which the proxy where El Greco directed that his son, Jorge Manuel, should have the power to make his last will and testament, and the inventory of El Greco's house which mentioned 143 paintings and many books.

In 1902 the first exhibition of his works took place in Prado, Madrid. In 1908 another exhibition with El Greco's works was organized in Paris, and in 1910 the El Greco Museum was founded in Toledo. In 1911, the exhibition of the Hungarian collector, Marczell von Nemes at the Alte Pinakothek in Munich presented eight paintings by El Greco for the first time in Germany, Hugo von Tschudi, a close friend of Meier Craefe, wrote the introduction to the catalogue, and made the comparisons between El Greco and the French Impressionists. Franz Marc wrote a tribute to Meier-Graefe and Tschudi, because they had offered to Germany "the world of transcendent ideas of a great painter, it were completely ignorant of: El Greco".

To the English artist and critic Roger Fry in 1920, El Greco was the archetypal genius who did as he thought best "with complete indifference to what effect the right expression might have on the public". Fry described El Greco as "an old master who is not merely modern, but actually appears a good many steps ahead of us, turning back to show us the way". During the same period, other researchers developed alternate, more radical theories. Doctors August Goldschmidt and Germán Beritens argued that El Greco painted such elongated human figures because he had vision problems (possibly progressive astigmatism or strabismus) that made him see bodies longer than they were, and at an angle to the perpendicular. This theory enjoyed surprising popularity during the early years of the twentieth century. The El Greco fallacy, which postulated that perceptual abnormalities influence interactions with the world at large, comes from this hypothesis. However, these theories were opposed by the German psychologist David Kuntz. Whether or not El Greco had progressive astigmatism is still open to debate. Stuart Anstis, Professor at the University of California (Department of Psychology) concludes that "even if El Greco were astigmatic, he would have adapted to it, and his figures, whether drawn from memory or life, would have had normal proportions. His elongations were an artistic expression, not a visual symptom." According to Professor of Spanish John Armstrong Crow, "astigmatism could never give quality to a canvas, nor talent to a dunce". English writer W. Somerset Maugham attributed El Greco's personal style to the artist's "latent homosexuality", and doctor Arturo Perera to the use of marijuana.

After 1930, the scholarly interested is primarily concentrated on the Italian period of the painter. At the same time prominent scholars debated whether El Greco's style had Byzantine origins. Certain art historians had asserted that El Greco's roots were firmly in the Byzantine tradition, and that his most individual characteristics derive directly from the art of his ancestors, while, others had argued that Byzantine art could not be related to El Greco's later work. The discovery of the Dormition of the Virgin on Syros, an authentic and signed work from the painter's Cretan period, and the extensive archival research in the early 1960s, contributed to the rekindling and reassessment of these theories. Significant scholarly works of the second half of the 20th century devoted to El Greco reappraise many of the interpretations of his work, including his supposed Byzantinism. Since the early 1960s, prominent scholars, primarily Greek ones, such as Nikolaos Panayotakis, Pandelis Prevelakis, Maria Constantoudaki and K.D. Mertzios, conducted an extensive archival research, which illuminates certain aspects of El Greco's life in Crete and Italy.

Michael Kimmelman, a reviewer for The New York Times, stated that "to Greeks [El Greco] became the quintessential Greek painter; to the Spanish, the quintessential Spaniard". As was proved by the campaign of the National Art Gallery in Athens to raise the funds for the purchase of Saint Peter in 1995, El Greco is not loved just by experts and art lovers but also by ordinary people; thanks to the donations mainly of individuals and public benefit foundations the National Art Gallery raised 1.2 million dollars and purchased the painting. Epitomizing the general consensus of El Greco's impact, Jimmy Carter, the 39th President of the United States, said in April 1980 that El Greco was "the most extraordinary painter that ever came along back then" and that he was "maybe three or four centuries ahead of his time". Wethey asserts that El Greco "developed into an artist so individual that he belongs to no conventional school but is a lonely genius of unprecedented emotional power and imagination".

== Influence on other artists ==
The Opening of the Fifth Seal (1608-1614, oil, 225 x 193 cm., New York, Metropolitan Museum) has been suggested to be the prime source of inspiration for Picasso's Les Demoiselles d' Avignon.	Picasso's Les Demoiselles d' Avignon (1907, oil on canvas, 243.9 x 233.7 cm., New York, Museum of Modern Art) appears to have certain morphological and stylistic similarities with The Opening of the Fifth Seal.

El Greco's re-evaluation was not limited to scholars. According to Foundoulaki, "painters and theoreticians from the beginning of the 20th century 'discovered' a new El Greco but in process they also discovered and revealed their own selves". His expressiveness and colors influenced Eugène Delacroix and Édouard Manet. The first painter who appears to have noticed the structural code in the morphology of the mature El Greco was Paul Cézanne, one of the forerunners of cubism. Maurice Denis, a deep admirer of Cézanne, was the first one to connect El Greco with Cézanne; he had the idea of connecting the early period of Cézanne to El Greco. In an article of his in 1907 Denis, when he is referring to El Greco, he does not omit any of the commonplaces which have been formulated about him, but, on the other hand, he establishes a new, dynamic relationship between El Greco and modern art.

Comparative morphological analyses of the two painters revealed their common elements, such as the distortion of the human body, the reddish and (in appearance only) unworked backgrounds and the similarities in the rendering of space. It would also be interesting to study the "unfinished" works of both painters and their similarities. According to Brown, "Cézanne and El Greco are spiritual brothers despite the centuries which separate them". Fry observed that Cézanne drew from "his great discovery of the permeation of every part of the design with a uniform and continuous plastic theme".

The Symbolists, and Pablo Picasso during his blue period, drew on the cold tonality of El Greco, utilizing the anatomy of his ascetic figures. While Picasso was working on Les Demoiselles d'Avignon, he visited his friend Ignacio Zuloaga in his studio in Paris and studied El Greco's Opening of the Fifth Seal (owned by Zuloaga since 1897). The relation between Les Demoiselles d'Avignon and the Opening of the Fifth Seal was pinpointed in the early 1980s, when the stylistic similarities and the relationship between the motifs of both works were analysed by Ron Johnson, John Richardson and Rolf Laesse. A part of this inquiry was also a polemic: was there more El Greco or Cézanne in Les Demoiselles d'Avignon. Alfred H. Barr Jr. spots the presence of El Greco and Cézanne in both The Villagers and Les Demoiselles d'Avignon.

"In any case, only the execution counts. From this point of view, it is correct to say that Cubism has a Spanish origin and that I invented Cubism. We must look for the Spanish influence in Cézanne. Things themselves necessitate it, the influence of El Greco, a Venetian painter, on him. But his structure is Cubist."
Picasso speaking of Les Demoiselles d'Avignon to Dor de la Souchère in Antibes.

The early cubist explorations of Picasso were to uncover other aspects in the work of El Greco: structural analysis of his compositions, multi-faced refraction of form, interweaving of form and space, and special effects of highlights. Several traits of cubism, such as distortions and the materialistic rendering of time, have their analogies in El Greco's work. According to Picasso, El Greco's structure is cubist. On February 22, 1950, Picasso began his series of "paraphrases" of other painters' works with The Portrait of a Painter after El Greco. In 1957 Picasso wrote a surrealist farce entitled The Burial of the Count of Orgaz where he has the "Meninas" burying the count. Foundoulaki asserts that Picasso "completed ... the process for the activation of the painterly values of El Greco which had been started by Manet and carried on by Cézanne". David Douglas Duncan relates that once, while he and Picasso were talking about influences from El Greco and Cézanne that appeared in his early paintings, Picasso grumbled in his voice that sounded like a cello: "Naturally, a painter always has a father and a mother".

The expressionists focused on the expressive distortions of El Greco. According to Franz Marc, one of the principal painters of the German expressionist movement, "we refer with pleasure and with steadfastness to the case of El Greco, because the glory of this painter is closely tied to the evolution of our new perceptions on art". Jackson Pollock, a major force in the abstract expressionist movement, was also influenced by El Greco. By 1943, Pollock had completed sixty drawing compositions after El Greco and owned three books on the Cretan master.

Portrait of Jorge Manuel Theotocopoulos (1600-1605, oil on canvas, 81 x 56 cm, Museo Provincial de Bellas Artes, Seville)

Contemporary painters are also inspired by El Greco's art. Kysa Johnson used El Greco's paintings of the Immaculate Conception as the compositional framework for some of her works, and the master's anatomical distortions are somewhat reflected in Fritz Chesnut's portraits.

El Greco's personality and work were a source of inspiration for poet Rainer Maria Rilke. One set of Rilke's poems (Himmelfahrt Mariae I.II., 1913) was based directly on El Greco's Immaculate Conception. Greek writer Nikos Kazantzakis, who felt a great spiritual affinity for El Greco, called his autobiography Report to Greco and wrote a tribute to the Cretan-born artist.

In the 1947 Spanish film Lady in Ermine, El Greco is played by José Prada.

In 1998, the Greek electronic composer and artist Vangelis published El Greco, a symphonic album inspired by the artist. This album is an expansion of an earlier album by Vangelis, Foros Timis Ston Greco (A Tribute to El Greco, Greek: Φόρος Τιμής Στον Γκρέκο).

The life of the Cretan-born artist is the subject of El Greco, a 2007 Greek-Spanish film directed by Yannis Smaragdis and starring British actor Nick Ashdon as El Greco.

== See also ==
- List of works by El Greco
