= Till dom som bryr sig =

Studio album by Solen
- Released: 29 October 2014
- Recorded: 2014
- Studio: Dustward Studios (Stockholm, Sweden)
- Genre: Pop rock
- Length: 39:26
- Label: Playground Music
- Producer: Stefan Brändström, Solen

Solen chronology
Solen (2012)	Till dom som bryr sig (2014)	Känslor säljer / Miljonär (2017)

Singles from Till dom som bryr sig
- 1. "Förlorare"; 2. "Solguden"; 3. "Kom Kom Kom"

Professional ratings
Review scores
Source	Rating
Arbetarbladet	4/5 stars
Corren	4/5 stars
Nöjesguiden	3/6 stars

Till dom som bryr sig is the second studio album by Swedish indie pop band Solen. It was released on 29 October 2014. The album was nominated for the 2015 Grammis Award for "Best Rock" album.

== Track listing ==
All lyrics are written by Solen; all music is composed by Solen

Till dom som bryr sig track listing
No.	Title	Length
1.	"Kom Kom Kom" (Come Come Come)	3:01
2.	"Estelle"	4:42
3.	"Glöm bort mig nu" (Forget Me Now)	4:53
4.	"Till dom som bryr sig" (To Those Who Care)	3:08
5.	"Kedjan" (The Chain)	3:50
6.	"Låt mig gå" (Let Me Go)	4:45
7.	"Förlorare" (Loser)	3:40
8.	"Snälla svara" (Please Answer)	3:57
9.	"Solguden" (The Sun God)	3:28
10.	"Genomskinlig" (Transparent)	4:01

== Personnel ==
=== Solen ===
- Erik Hillborg – lead vocals, guitars
- Nils Dahlqvist – bass
- Gustav Karlsson – guitars
- Olle Darmell – drums

=== Additional musicians ===
- Caroline Arvidsson – vocals on track 5, 8, 10
- Bård Ericsson – cello on track 10

=== Technical ===
- Solen – producer
- Stefan Brändström – producer, recording
