= Vivian Maier =

American photographer (1926–2009)

- Self-portrait, New York City, c. 1950s
- Born: Vivian Dorothy Maier; February 1, 1926; New York City, U.S.
- Died: April 21, 2009 (aged 83); Oak Park, Illinois, U.S.
- Known for: Street photography

Vivian Dorothy Maier (February 1, 1926 – April 21, 2009) was an American street photographer whose work was discovered and recognized after her death. She took more than 150,000 photographs during her lifetime, primarily of the people and architecture of Chicago, New York City, and Los Angeles, although she also traveled and photographed around the world.

During her lifetime, Maier's photographs were unknown and unpublished; many of her negatives were never printed or scanned. A Chicago collector, John Maloof, acquired some of Maier's photos in 2007, while two other Chicago-based collectors, Ron Slattery and Randy Prow, also found some of Maier's prints and negatives in her boxes and suitcases around the same time. Maier's photographs were first published on the Internet in July 2008, by Slattery, but the work received little response. In October 2009, Maloof linked his blog to a selection of Maier's photographs on the image-sharing website Flickr, and the results went viral, with thousands of people expressing interest. Maier's work subsequently attracted critical acclaim, and since then, Maier's photographs have been exhibited around the world.

Her life and work have been the subject of books, music and documentary films, including the film Finding Vivian Maier (2013), which premiered at the Toronto International Film Festival, and was nominated for the Academy Award for Best Documentary Feature at the 87th Academy Awards.

== Early life ==
Many details of Maier's life remain unknown. She was born in New York City in 1926, the daughter of a French mother, Maria Jaussaud Justin, and an Austrian father, Charles Maier (also known as Wilhelm). Several times during her childhood she moved between the U.S. and France, living with her mother in the alpine village of Saint-Bonnet-en-Champsaur near her mother's relatives. Her father seems to have left the family temporarily for unknown reasons by 1930. In the 1930 census, the head of the household was listed as Jeanne Bertrand, a successful photographer who knew Gertrude Vanderbilt Whitney, founder of the Whitney Museum of American Art. When Maier was 4, she and her mother moved to the Bronx with Bertrand.

In 1935, Vivian and her mother were living in Saint-Julien-en-Champsaur; three years later, they returned to New York. In the 1940 census, Charles, Maria, Vivian and Charles Jr were listed as living in New York, where the father worked as a steam engineer.

== Career ==
In 1951, aged 25, Maier moved from France to New York, where she worked in a sweatshop. She moved to Chicago's North Shore area in 1956, where she worked primarily as a nanny and carer for the next 40 years. In her first 17 years in Chicago, Maier worked as a nanny for two families: the Gensburgs from 1956 to 1972, and the Raymonds from 1967 to 1973. Lane Gensburg later said of Maier, "She was like a real, live Mary Poppins," and said she never talked down to kids and was determined to show them the world outside their affluent suburb.

The families who employed her described her as very private and reported that she spent her days off walking the streets of Chicago and taking photographs, usually with a Rolleiflex camera. She would frequently take the young children in her care with her into the center of Chicago when she took her photographs. Occasionally they accompanied her to the rougher, run-down areas of Chicago, and, on one occasion, the stock yards, where there were bodies of dead sheep.

In the documentary films Finding Vivian Maier (2013) and Vivian Maier: Who Took Nanny's Pictures / The Vivian Maier Mystery (2013), interviews with Maier's employers and their children suggest that Maier presented herself to others in multiple ways, with various accents, names, life details, and that with some children, she had been inspiring and positive, while with others she could be frightening and abusive.

John Maloof, curator of some of Maier's photographs, summarized the way the children she nannied would later describe her:

She was a Socialist, a Feminist, a movie critic, and a tell-it-like-it-is type of person. She learned English by going to theaters, which she loved ... She was constantly taking pictures, which she didn't show anyone.

In 1959 and 1960, Maier embarked on a solo trip around the world, taking pictures in Los Angeles, Philippines, Thailand, Hong Kong, Vietnam, Malaysia, Singapore, India, Yemen, Egypt, Greece, Lebanon, Syria, Turkey, Italy, France, and Switzerland. The trip was probably financed by the sale of a family farm in Saint-Julien-en-Champsaur. For a brief period in the 1970s, Maier worked as a housekeeper for talk-show host Phil Donahue. She kept her belongings at her employers'; at one residence, she had 200 boxes of materials. Most contained photographs or negatives, but Maier also collected newspapers; in at least one instance, it involved "shoulder-high piles." She also recorded audiotapes of conversations she had with people she photographed.

== Later years ==
The Gensburg brothers, whom Maier had looked after as children, tried to help her as she became destitute in old age. When she was about to be evicted from a downmarket apartment in the suburb of Cicero, the Gensburg brothers arranged for her to live in a better apartment on Sheridan Road in the Rogers Park area of Chicago. In November 2008, Maier fell on the ice and hit her head. She was taken to a hospital but failed to recover. In January 2009, she was transported to a nursing home in the Chicago suburbs, where she died in April 2009. She was buried in a patch of wild strawberries in a ravine near the house of a family whose children she had cared for in the early 1960s. As one of those children said in Finding Vivian Maier, "I think she liked it so much, that's why they buried her there".

== Discovery and recognition ==
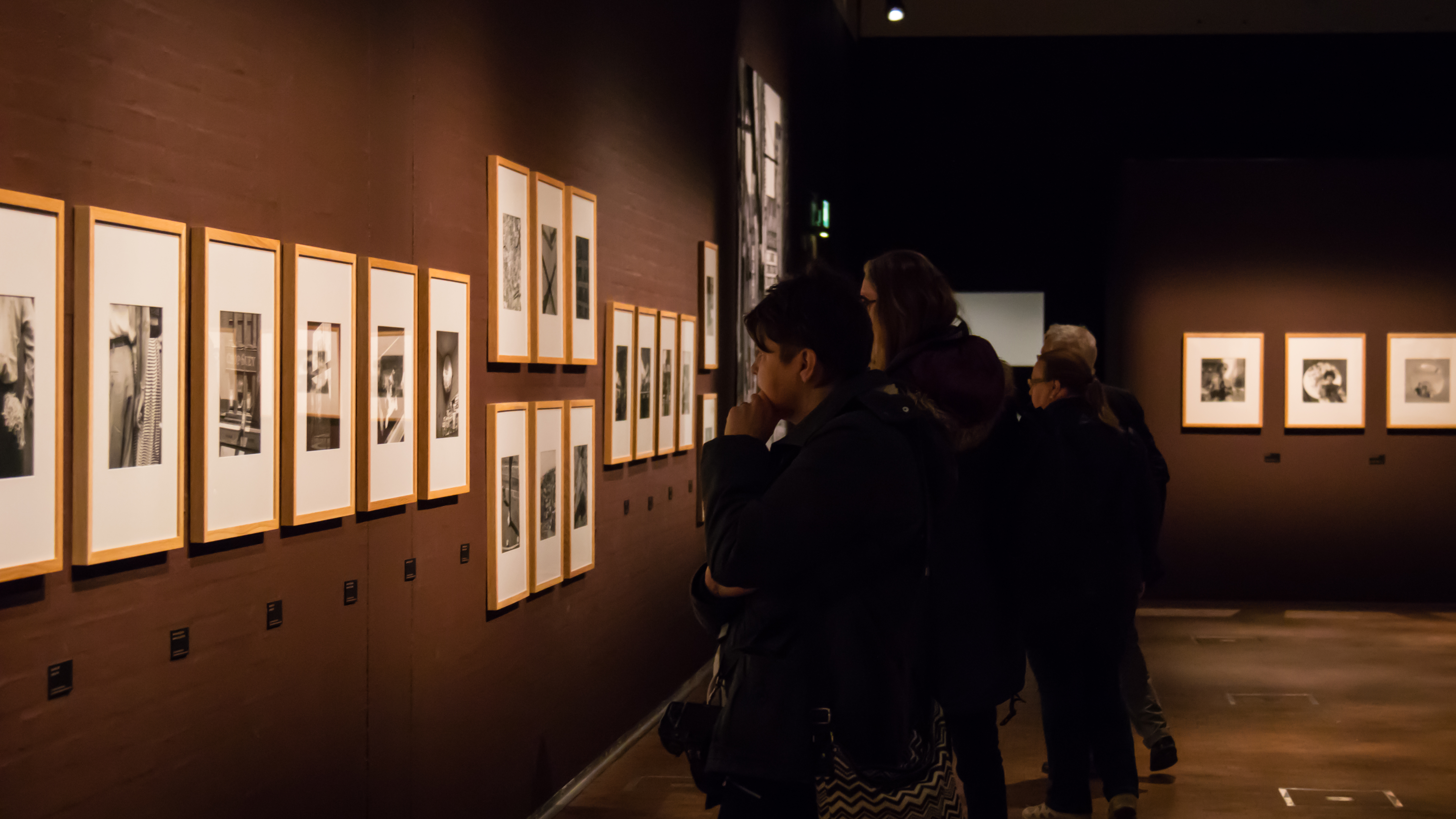
Vivian Maier show in Dunker Culture House in Helsingborg 2016.

In 2007, two years before she died, Maier failed to keep up payments on storage space she had rented on Chicago's North Side. As a result, her negatives, prints, audio recordings, and 8 mm film were auctioned. Three photo collectors bought parts of her work: John Maloof, Ron Slattery and Randy Prow. Maier's photographs were first published on the internet in July 2008 by Slattery, but the work received little response.

Maloof had bought the largest part of Maier's work, about 30,000 negatives, because he was working on a book about the history of the Chicago neighborhood of Portage Park. Maloof later bought more of Maier's photographs from another buyer at the same auction. Maloof discovered Maier's name in his boxes but was unable to discover anything about her until a Google search led him to Maier's death notice in the Chicago Tribune in April 2009. In October 2009, Maloof linked his blog to a selection of Maier's photographs on Flickr; they became a viral phenomenon, with thousands of people expressing interest.

In early 2010, Chicago art collector Jeffrey Goldstein acquired a portion of the Maier collection from Prow, one of the original buyers. Since Goldstein's original purchase, his collection has grown to include 17,500 negatives, 2,000 prints, 30 home movies, and numerous slides. In December 2014, Goldstein sold his collection of black and white negatives to Stephen Bulger Gallery, Toronto. Maloof, who runs the Maloof Collection, now owns around 90% of Maier's total output, including 100,000 to 150,000 negatives, more than 3,000 vintage prints, hundreds of rolls of film, home movies, audio tape interviews, and ephemera including cameras and paperwork, which he claims represents roughly 90 percent of her known work.

Since her posthumous discovery, Maier's photographs, and their discovery, have received international attention in mainstream media, and her work has appeared in gallery exhibitions, several books, and documentary films.

=== Legal challenge ===
In June 2014, lawyer and former photographer David C. Deal filed a legal case challenging the rights of current owners of Maier's negatives to commercialize them. The case sought to establish whether there is a legal heir to Maier's estate — a cousin in France — who should be recognized under American law. Under copyright law in the US, owning a photograph is distinct from owning copyright, and the case may take several years to resolve, particularly since the potential heirs to the estate live outside the US. Maloof, who owns the majority of Maier's known photographs, had previously tracked down a first cousin once removed in France, Sylvain Jaussaud, and paid him $5,000 for the rights; however, Deal believes he has found a closer relative in France, Francis Baille, who may be the estate's beneficiary.

Because of the dispute, Cook County, Illinois, created an estate for Maier in 2014, administered by the Cook County Public Administrator. In May 2016, the county-administered estate reached a confidential settlement with Maloof which allowed him to continue commercializing Maier's work in exchange for sharing revenue with the estate. Goldstein refused to settle and was sued by the estate for copyright and trademark infringement in 2017. That case was resolved in 2019 through a confidential settlement that required Goldstein to make a payment to the estate. As of 2024, the probate court had still not determined Maier's rightful heirs, and her estate continues to be administered by the Cook County Public Administrator.

== Photography ==
Artist and photography critic Allan Sekula has suggested that the fact that Maier spent much of her early life in France sharpened her visual appreciation of American cities and society. Sekula compared her work with the photography of Swiss-born Robert Frank.

Maloof has said of her work: "Elderly folk congregating in Chicago's Old Polish Downtown, garishly dressed dowagers, and the urban African-American experience were all fair game for Maier's lens." Photographer Mary Ellen Mark has compared her work to that of Helen Levitt, Robert Frank, Lisette Model, and Diane Arbus. Joel Meyerowitz, also a street photographer, has said that Maier's work was "suffused with the kind of human understanding, warmth and playfulness that proves she was 'a real shooter'."

Maier's best-known photographs depict street scenes in Chicago and New York during the 1950s and 1960s. A critic in The Independent wrote that "the well-to-do shoppers of Chicago stroll and gossip in all their department-store finery before Maier, but the most arresting subjects are those people on the margins of successful, rich America in the 1950s and 1960s: the kids, the black maids, the bums flaked out on shop stoops." Most of Maier's photographs are black and white, and many are casual shots of passers-by caught in transient moments "that nonetheless possess an underlying gravity and emotion".

In 1952, she purchased her first Rolleiflex camera. Over the course of her career she used Rolleiflex 3.5T, Rolleiflex 3.5F, Rolleiflex 2.8C, Rolleiflex Automat and others. She later also used a Leica IIIc rangefinder camera, an Ihagee Exakta, a Zeiss Contarex and other SLR cameras.

Writing in The Wall Street Journal, William Meyers notes that because Maier used a medium-format Rolleiflex, rather than a 35mm camera, her pictures have more detail than those of most street photographers. He writes that her work brings to mind the photographs of Harry Callahan, Garry Winogrand, and Weegee, as well as Robert Frank. He also notes that there are a high number of self-portraits in her work, "in many ingenious permutations, as if she were checking on her own identity or interpolating herself into the environment. A shadowy character, she often photographed her own shadow, possibly as a way of being there and simultaneously not quite there."

Roberta Smith, writing in The New York Times, has drawn attention to how Maier's photographs are reminiscent of many famous 20th-century photographers, and yet have an aesthetic of their own. She writes that Maier's work "may add to the history of 20th-century street photography by summing it up with an almost encyclopedic thoroughness, veering close to just about every well-known photographer you can think of, including Weegee, Robert Frank and Richard Avedon, and then sliding off in another direction. Yet they maintain a distinctive element of calm, a clarity of composition and a gentleness characterized by a lack of sudden movement or extreme emotion."

In the late 1970s, Maier stopped using her Rolleiflex. Most of her photographs taken in the 1980s and 1990s were color transparencies, taken on Ektachrome film.

== Legacy ==
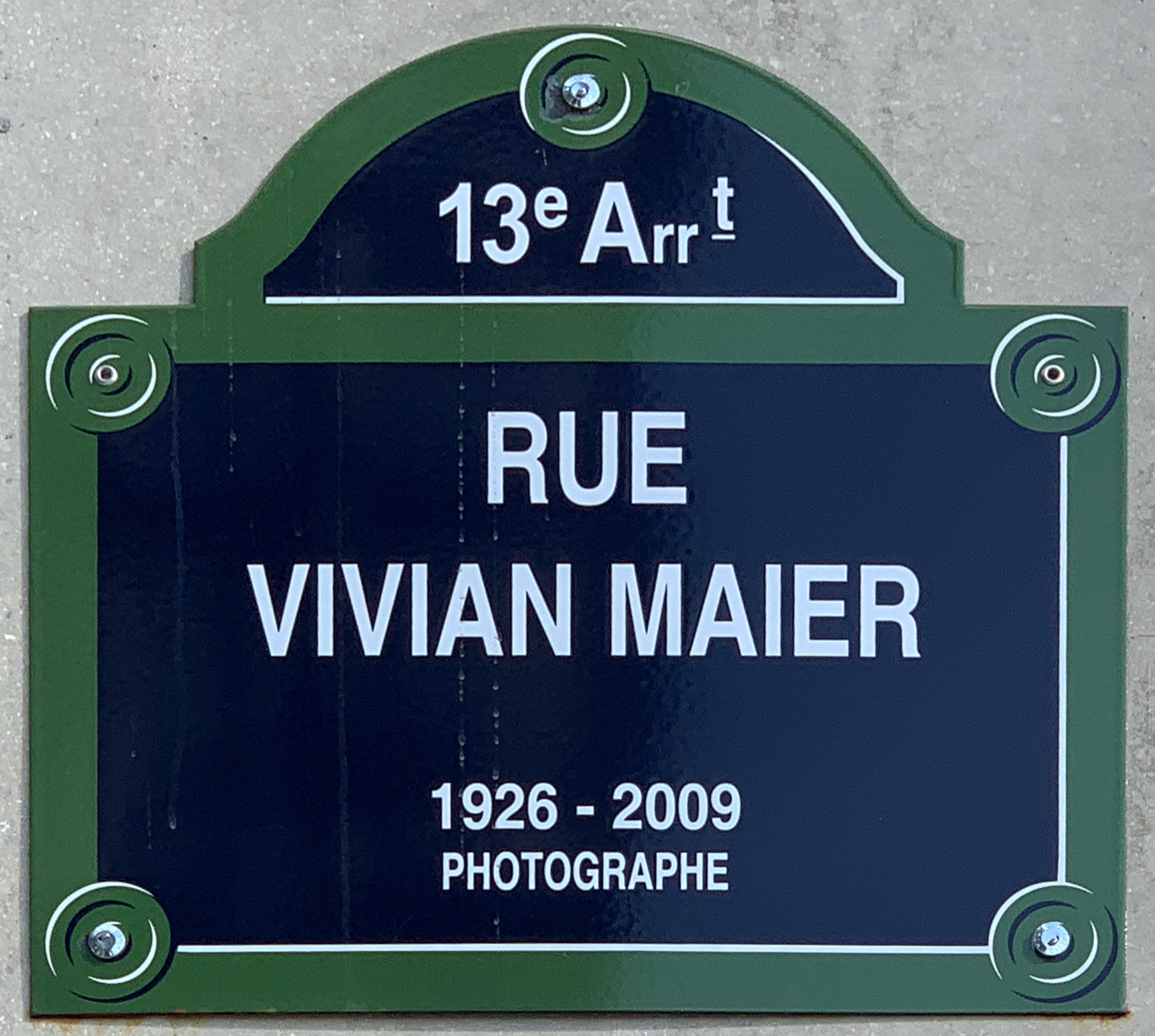
Rue Vivian Maier in Paris

A documentary on Maier, Finding Vivian Maier, was released in 2013. It featured some of the now grown children whom Maier had cared for in the 1950s, '60s, and '70s, who recalled how she combined her work as a photographer with her day job as a nanny.

In the 2014 to 2015 school year at the School of the Art Institute of Chicago, the Vivian Maier Scholarship Fund was established to provide opportunity to female students with need for additional financial resources. The scholarship was endowed through donations by Maloof, Siskel and Howard Greenberg, the owner of Howard Greenberg Gallery which exhibits and deals her work. Maloof used the funds received from print sales and his film Finding Vivian Maier to help create the scholarship with the intention for it to be permanent and offered on a yearly basis. With no application process, the money will be awarded to students not based on degree, enrollment year, or medium they are working within, allowing artistic freedom to the recipients. The names of recipients have not been publicly released.

=== Documentary films about Maier ===
- Vivian Maier: Who Took Nanny's Pictures (2013) – directed by Jill Nicholls, produced by the BBC
  - The Vivian Maier Mystery (2013) – re-cut and released in the U.S.
- Finding Vivian Maier (2013) – directed by Maloof and Charlie Siskel
- The Woman in the Mirror (2017) – directed by Ryan Alexander Huang, biographical short film

=== Music ===
In 2018, Welsh rock band Manic Street Preachers recorded the song "Vivian" for the Resistance Is Futile album; lyricist Nicky Wire is a fan of her work. Fellow band members stated that "She was probably one of the best casual journalistic photographers who ever lived, but never been recognised. Nick became obsessed with Vivian Maier as a photographer, I think he sees it as a true representation of an artist working and having no feedback from the outside world."

Canadian singer-songwriter Patrick Watson wrote a song in 2022 called ''Ode to Vivian'', inspired by the late photographer.

== Archives ==
In 2017, the University of Chicago Library announced that a research collection of Maier images was donated by Maloof.

== Publications ==
=== Books of Maier's photographs ===
- Vivian Maier: Street Photographer. Brooklyn, NY: powerHouse, 2011. ISBN 978-1-57687-577-3. Edited by John Maloof. With an introduction by Maloof and a foreword by Geoff Dyer.
- Vivian Maier: Out of the Shadows. Chicago, IL: CityFiles, 2012. ISBN 978-0978545093. Edited by Richard Cahan and Michael Williams.
- Vivian Maier: Self-Portraits. Brooklyn, NY: powerHouse, 2013. ISBN 978-1-57687-662-6. Edited by Maloof.
- Eye to Eye: Photographs by Vivian Maier. Chicago, IL: CityFiles, 2014. ISBN 9780991541805. Edited and with text by Richard Cahan and Michael Williams.
- Vivian Maier: A Photographer Found. London: Harper Design, 2014. ISBN 9780062305534. Edited by Maloof with text by Marvin Heiferman and Howard Greenberg.
- The Color Work. New York City: Harper Design, 2014. ISBN 978-0062795571. With a foreword by Joel Meyerowitz and text by Colin Westerbeck.

=== Books about Maier ===
- Vivian Maier: a Photographer's Life and Afterlife. Chicago: University of Chicago, 2017. By Pamela Bannos. ISBN 978-0226470757.
- Vivian Maier Developed: The Real Story of the Photographer Nanny. Brooklyn, NY: powerHouse, 2018. By Ann Marks. ISBN 978-1576879030.
- Vivian Maier und der gespiegelte Blick: Fotografische Positionen zu Frauenbildern im Selbstporträt. Bielefeld, transcript, 2019. By Nadja Köffler. ISBN 978-3-8376-4700-6.

== Exhibitions ==
- March/April 2010, Bruun's Galleri, Århus, Denmark.
- Finding Vivian Maier, November/December 2010, The Apartment Gallery (Apartment 02), Oslo, Norway.
- Finding Vivian Maier: Chicago Street Photographer, 2011, Chicago Cultural Center.
- Twinkle, twinkle, little star ... , 2011, Galerie Hilaneh von Kories, Hamburg, Germany.
- Vivian Maier, Photographer, 2011, Russell Bowman Art Advisory, Chicago, Illinois.
- Vivian Maier – A Life Uncovered, 2011, German Gymnasium, London Street Photography Festival, London.
- Vivian Maier, Photographer, 2011/12, Hearst Gallery, New York.
- Vivian Maier – A Life Uncovered, 2011, Photofusion Gallery, London.
- Vivian Maier, Photographer, 2011, Stephen Cohen Gallery, Los Angeles.
- Vivian Maier – Hosted by Tim Roth, 2011/12, Merry Karnowsky Gallery, Los Angeles.
- Vivian Maier – Photographs 2012, Jackson Fine Art, Atlanta.
- Vivian Maier's Chicago, 2012–2014, Chicago History Museum, Chicago, Illinois.
- A la recherche de Vivian Maier (In search of Vivian Maier), 2011, Saint-Julien-en-Champsaur
- A la recherche de Vivian Maier (In search of Vivian Maier), 2011, Gap Library, Gap, Hautes-Alpes, France.
- Lo sguardo nascosto (The Hidden Glance), 2012, Brescia, Italy.
- Vivian Maier, 2013, Antwerp, Belgium, Gallery51.
- Vivian Maier: Out of the Shadows, 2013, Tampa, FL; Florida Museum of Photographic Arts.
- Summer in the City, 2013, Chicago, IL; Russell Bowman Art Advisory.
- Vivian Maier, 2013, Shanghai, China; Kunst.Licht Photo Art Gallery.
- Загадка Вивьен Майер (The Riddle of Vivian Maier), 2013, Moscow, Russia; Lumiere Brothers Center for Photography.
- Vivian Maier: Picturing Chicago, October 2013, Chicago, IL; Union League Club.
- Vivian Maier: A Woman's Lens, October 2013, Waltham, MA; Women's Studies Research Center, Brandeis University.
- Vivian Maier, 2013/14, Tours, France; Jeu de paume, Paris.
- Certificates of Presence: Vivian Maier, Livija Patikne, J. Lindemann, 2014, Milwaukee, WI; Portrait Society Gallery.
- Vivian Maier: Out of the Shadows, 2014, Minneapolis, MN; MPLS Photo Center.
- See All About It: Vivian Maier's Newspaper Portraits, 2014, Berkeley, CA; The Reva and David Logan Gallery at UC Berkeley's Graduate School of Journalism.
- Vivian Maier, Photographer, 2014, Fribourg, Switzerland; Cantonal and University Library.
- Vivian Maier: Out of The Shadows, 2014, Chicago, IL; Harold Washington Library.
- "Vivian Maier – Street Photographer", 2014/2015, FOAM Amsterdam, Netherlands
- O Mundo Revelado de Vivian Maier, São Paulo Museum of Image and Sound, São Paulo, Brazil, 2015.
- Vivian Maier – Street Photographer, 2015, Nuoro, Sardinia, Italy.
- Vivian Maier – In Her Own Hands, 2016, Fundació Foto Colectania, Barcelona, Spain.
- Vivian Maier – Street Photographer, 2018, WestLicht, Vienna, Austria.
- Vivian Maier – Works in Color, 2020, FOAM Amsterdam, Netherlands.
- Vivian Maier exhibition in the Musée du Luxembourg in Paris, 2021/2022.
- Vivian Maier: In Color, May 8, 2021 – December 31, 2022, Chicago History Museum
- Vivian Maier – Exhibition Inedita, 2022, Musei Reali Torino, Italy.
- Vivian Maier – The Self-Portrait and its Double, 2022, Centre for Fine Arts, Brussels, Belgium.
- Vivian Maier: Anthology, 2022, MK Gallery, Milton Keynes, UK.
- Vivian Maier: Unseen Work, 2024, Fotografiska New York
- Vivian Maier – Anthology, 2024, Haus der Fotografie Olten
- Vivian Maier – Unscripted, March/April 2025 KP Projects, Los Angeles.
- Vivian Maier: Unseen Work, 2026, Fotografiska Tallinn

== See also ==
- Angelo Rizzuto
- Charles Jones
- Paraska Plytka-Horytsvit
