= El Greco fallacy =

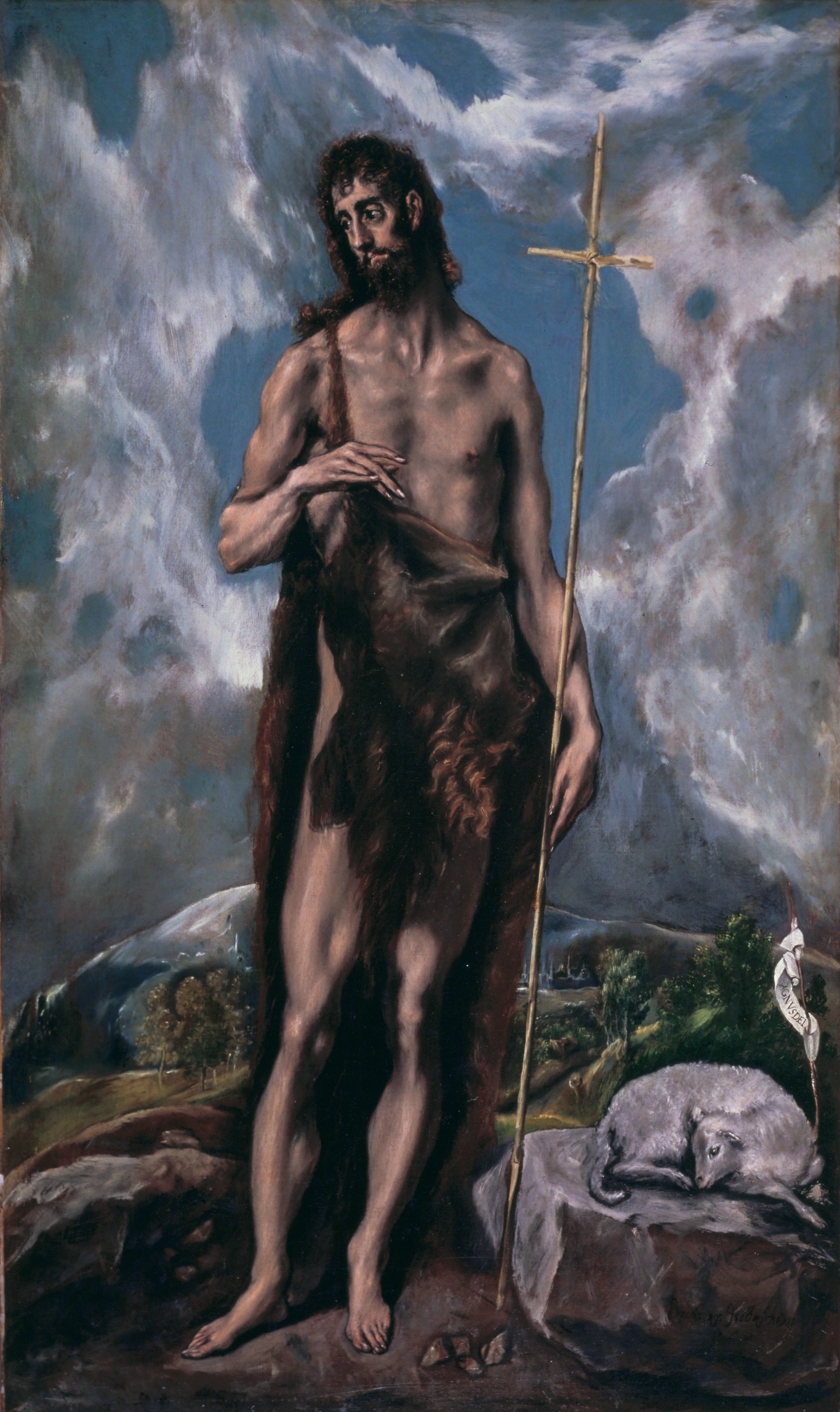
Saint John the Baptist, ca. 1600–1605, an example of El Greco's elongated style.

The El Greco fallacy is typically a perceptive fallacy, where it is assumed that particular perceptual abnormalities will influence interactions with the world of a similar nature. It is named after an erroneous explanation for the vertically distorted painting style of El Greco, which held that the artist must have seen the world as distorted by a peculiar astigmatism, and thus painted this distorted world. This theoretical astigmatism cannot explain El Greco's style though, as he would have seen his canvases distorted in the same way, and painting onto them would have cancelled out any distortion.

It is believed the term originated with Irvin Rock, in his 1966 book, The Nature of Perceptual Adaptation.

When explored in experiment — by having subjects wear distorting lenses — it seems likely that El Greco would have completely adapted to seeing a distorted world, and this could not have been an explanation.

== In perception research ==
Chaz Firestone and Brian Scholl have alleged that this fallacy has been the cause for mistaken thinking in perception research, including in studies that presumed to show that wearing a heavy backpack makes hills literally appear steeper, or holding rods outstretched horizontally would make doorways look narrower.

In the example of holding rods outstretched, the original experiment had subjects evaluate the width of apertures (intended to simulate doorways), then show this width on a ruler held by experimenters. The width was evaluated as narrower by those holding rods than those who were not. When Firestone and Scholl repeated this experiment, substituting rulers for a separate aperture that was adjusted by experimenters to the subjects instruction, the aperture was still evaluated as narrower. This narrowing effect was later implied to be a demand characteristic after another group was told that their holding a rod was an evaluation of balance abilities.
