= Finding Vivian Maier =

2013 American documentary film

- Promotional poster
- Directed by: John Maloof; Charlie Siskel
- Screenplay by: John Maloof; Charlie Siskel
- Produced by: John Maloof; Charlie Siskel
- Starring: John Maloof; Phil Donahue; Mary Ellen Mark; Joel Meyerowitz; Tim Roth
- Narrated by: John Maloof
- Cinematography: John Maloof
- Edited by: Aaron Wickenden
- Music by: J. Ralph
- Production company: Ravine Pictures
- Distributed by: IFC Films
- Release dates: September 9, 2013 (TIFF); March 28, 2014 (United States)
- Running time: 84 minutes
- Country: United States
- Languages: English; French
- Box office: $2.2 million

Finding Vivian Maier is a 2013 American documentary film about the photographer Vivian Maier, written, directed, and produced by John Maloof and Charlie Siskel, and executive produced by Jeff Garlin.

== Synopsis ==
Maier was a French-American woman who worked most of her life as a nanny and housekeeper to a multitude of Chicago families. She carried a camera everywhere she went, but Maier's photographic legacy was largely unknown during her lifetime. She died in 2009.

The film documents how Maloof discovered her work and, after her death, uncovered her life through interviews with people who knew her. Maloof had purchased a box of photo negatives at a 2007 Chicago auction, then scanned the images and put them on the Internet. News articles began to come out about Maier and a Kickstarter campaign for the documentary was soon underway (one also using her home movies, audio recordings and other archival materials).

== Interviews ==
- John Maloof
- Phil Donahue
- Mary Ellen Mark
- Joel Meyerowitz
- Tim Roth

== Reception ==
=== Critical response ===
Finding Vivian Maier has an approval rating of 95% on review aggregator website Rotten Tomatoes, based on 100 reviews, and an average rating of 7.50/10. The website's critical consensus states, "Narratively gripping, visually striking, and ultimately thought-provoking, Finding Vivian Maier shines an overdue spotlight on its subject's long-hidden brilliance". It also has a score of 75 out of 100 on Metacritic, based on 27 critics, indicating "generally favorable" reviews.

The film had its world premiere at the 2013 Toronto International Film Festival on 9 September 2013. It was shown in cinemas, and was released on DVD in November 2014. Upon release, the film received critical acclaim, and won various awards, and was nominated for the Academy Award for Best Documentary Feature at the 87th Academy Awards.

=== Accolades ===
- 2014: Best Documentary Feature, Alaska Airlines Audience Award, Portland International Film Festival.
- 2014: Best New Director Award, Alaska Airlines Audience Award, Portland International Film Festival.
- 2014: Founders Prize for Best Documentary, Traverse City Film Festival.
- 2014: Won (tied with The Overnighters by Jesse Moss) Grand Jury Prize, Knight Documentary Competition, Miami International Film Festival.
- 2014: John Schlesinger Award for Outstanding First Feature, Palm Springs International Film Festival.
- 2014: Nominated for an Academy Award for Best Documentary Feature at the 87th Academy Awards.
- 2014: Nominated for Best Documentary Screenplay from the Writers Guild of America.
