= Zacharie Astruc =

French sculptor (1833–1907)

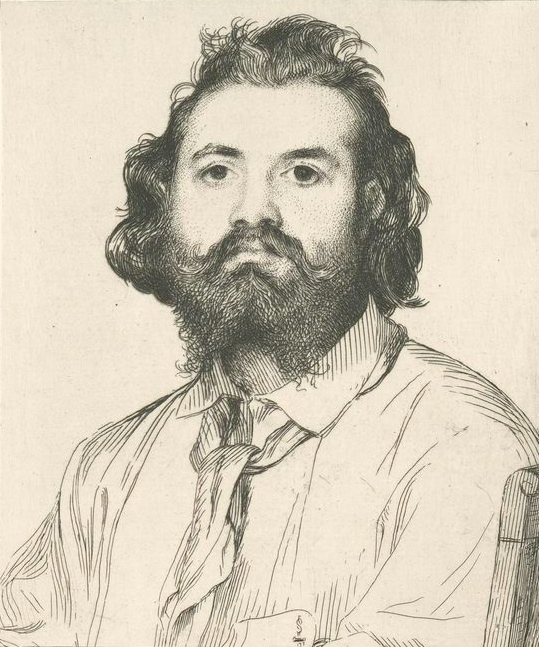
- Etching by Félix Bracquemond, c. 1865
- Born: February 23, 1833; Angers, France
- Died: May 24, 1907 (aged 74); Paris, France
- Movement: Impressionism
- Spouse: Ida Astruc

Zacharie Astruc (23 February 1833 in Angers – 24 May 1907 in Paris) was a French sculptor, painter, poet, and art critic.

== Biography ==
Astruc was an important figure in the cultural life of France in the second half of the 19th century, and participated in the First Impressionist Exhibition of 1874 and also in the Exposition Universelle of 1900. As an art critic, writing primarily between 1859 and 1872, he was a strong defender of Courbet, and was one of the first to recognize the talent of Manet, who he had befriended as early as 1854, or 1857 at the latest. He also defended Monet, Whistler, Carolus-Duran, Fantin-Latour, and Alphonse Legros. Art historian Michael Fried has written that Astruc "more than any other writer spoke for Manet's generation" and that "between 1859 and 1863 the young Astruc may have been the best critic of new art in France."

Astruc had a very wide range of artistic interests, both in subject and in form. Before becoming most well-known as a sculptor, he was a writer, critic, painter, playwright, and composer.

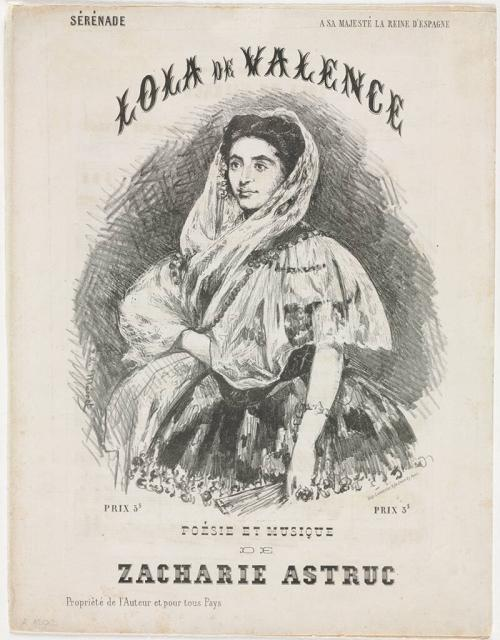
Sheet music for "Lola de Valence", 1863

Astruc was a hispanophile, well versed in the art and literature of Spain. After his own trip to Spain in 1864, he helped prepare the itinerary for Manet's only trip to Spain in 1865 by sending him a "long and effusive" itinerary, and later praised Manet's Spanish-inspired paintings as the work of "the artist who revealed Spain to the French." Astruc helped to promote a widespread revival of interest in El Greco's paintings. He wrote a song dedicated to the Spanish dancer Lola de Valence in 1863, which was printed with a reproduction of a painting by Manet of de Valence as cover art.

Astruc was also a leading figure in the Japonism movement in France in the 1860s and '70s, publishing, among other writings, three pivotal articles on Japonism in the Parisian newspaper, L'Etendard, in 1867–68. He wrote a Japanese-influenced play, L'ile de la demoiselle, in 1865.

He was married to Ida Astruc, whose bust Manet sculpted in Spanish costume in 1877.

Astruc was an important connecting figure in the French art world of the time, if not a hugely important artist in his own right, and can be seen in several notable artworks of the 1860s to 1880s. He appears in Henri Fantin-Latour's painting A Studio at Les Batignolles, where he is seated next to Manet, who is shown painting his portrait. Astruc is generally credited with titling Manet's painting Olympia since an excerpt from an Astruc poem was included in the catalogue entry with the piece when it was exhibited at the 1865 Salon. Manet painted Astruc at least twice: Once in a portrait in 1866, and again in 1870's Music Lesson, in which Astruc plays the role of a music master teaching a young girl; Astruc's guitar can be seen in both works.

Along with many figures in the French art world of the late 1800s, Astruc inspired a character in French writer Marius Roux's novel The Substance and the Shadow, a roman à clef whose main character was a thinly disguised Paul Cézanne. "Lespignac", Astruc's character, is a con artist who becomes an art dealer.

== Works by Astruc ==
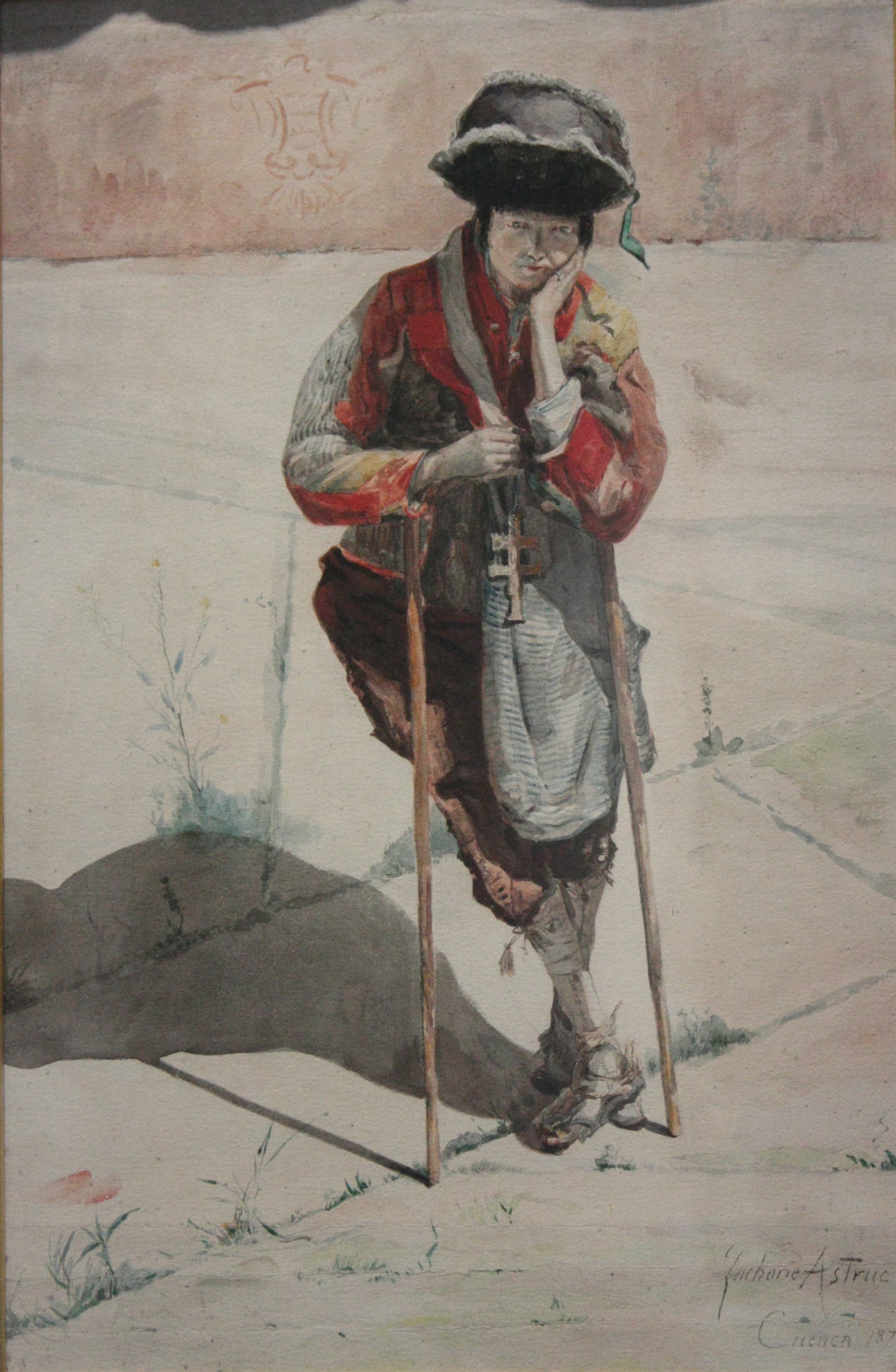
Scène de rue à Cuenca, 1873

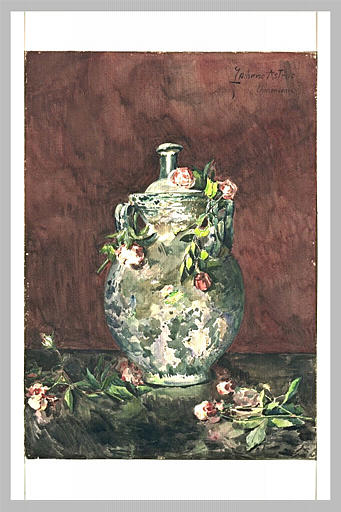
Roses Carelessly
Thrown on a Vase

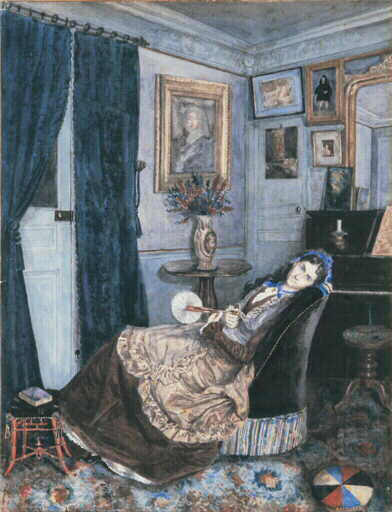
Parisian Interior

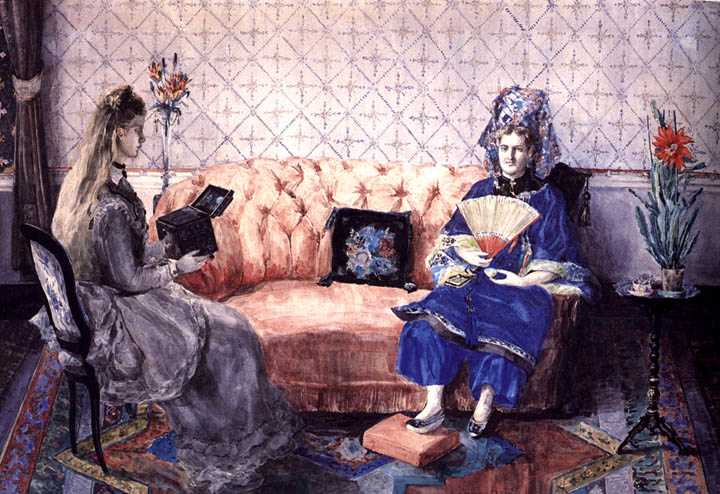
Chinese Gifts

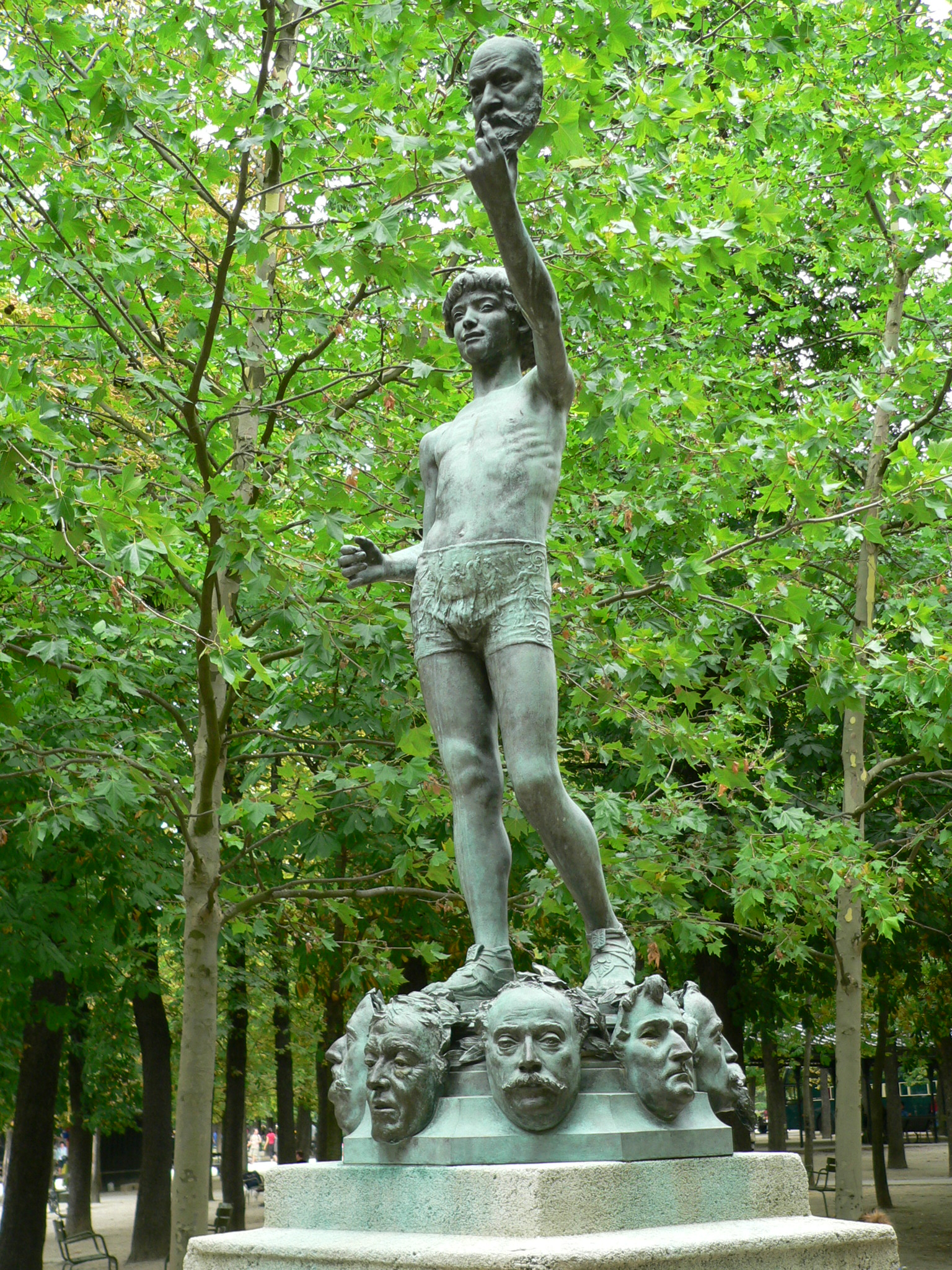
The Mask Seller
Jardin du Luxembourg

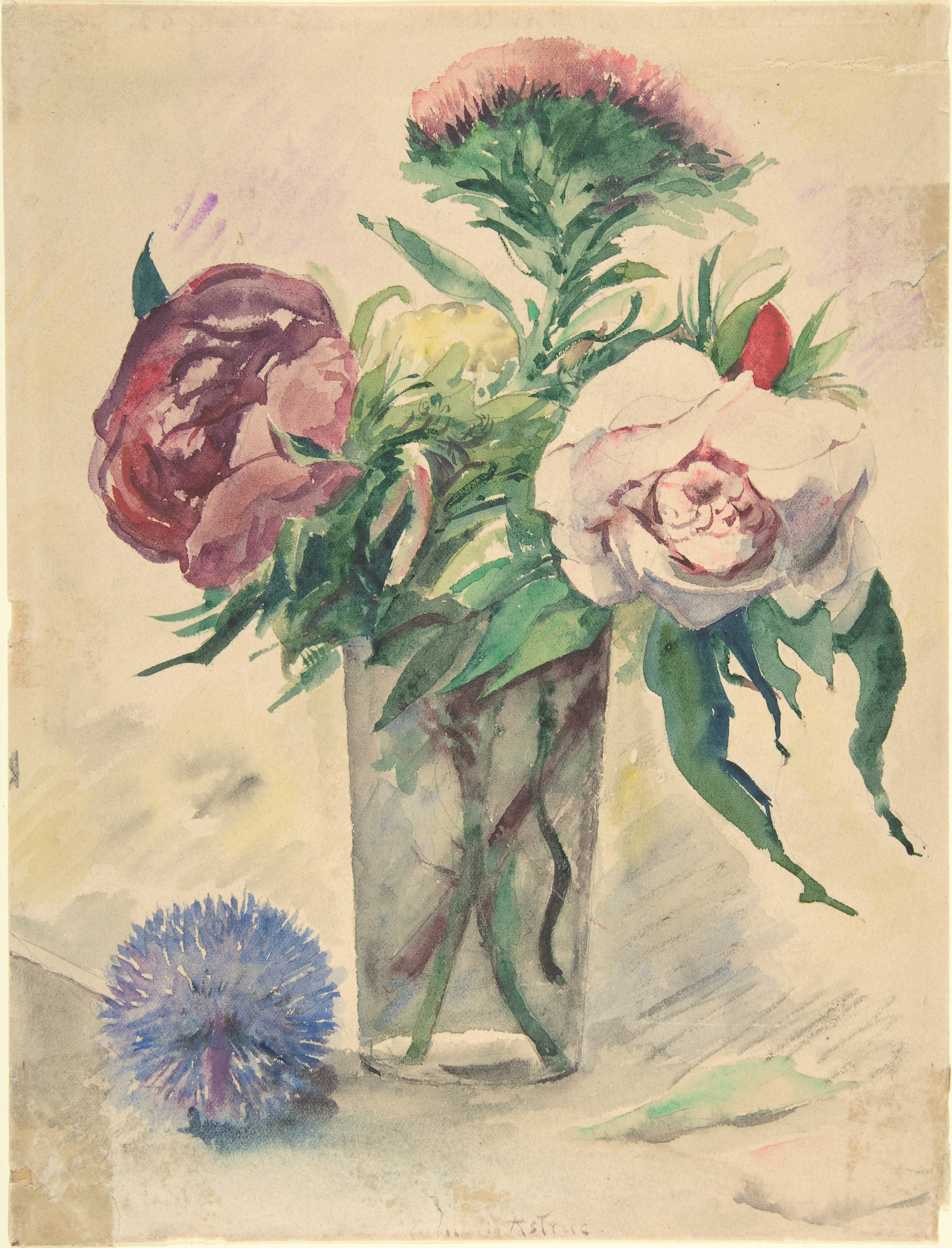
Flowers in a Vase, c. 1884–1904

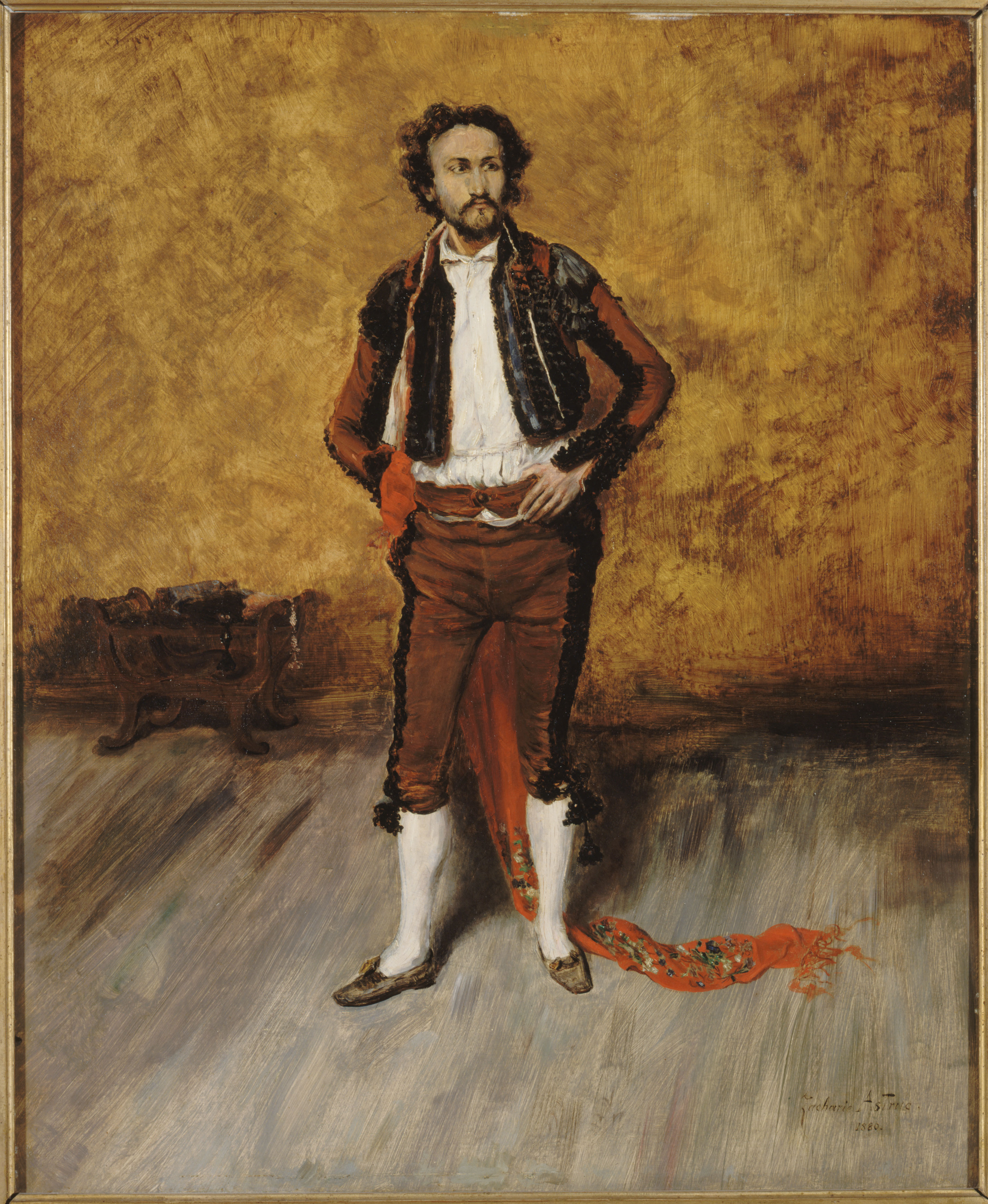
La toilette du toréro, 1880

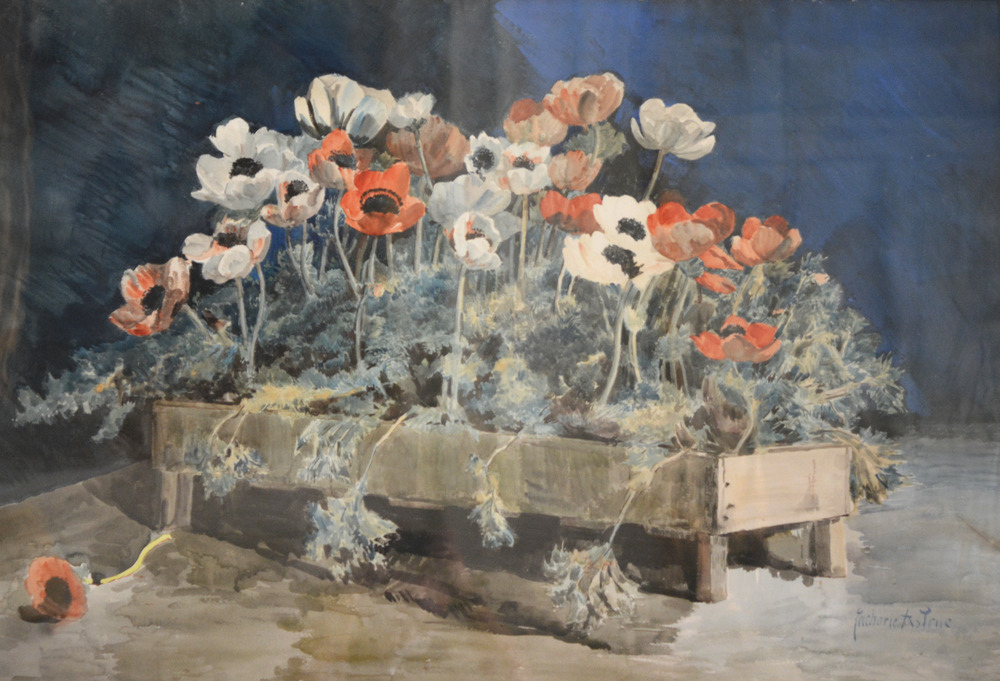
Anémones en caisse, c. 1889

== Works featuring Astruc ==
A friend of many French artists of his era, Astruc was often included in their works.

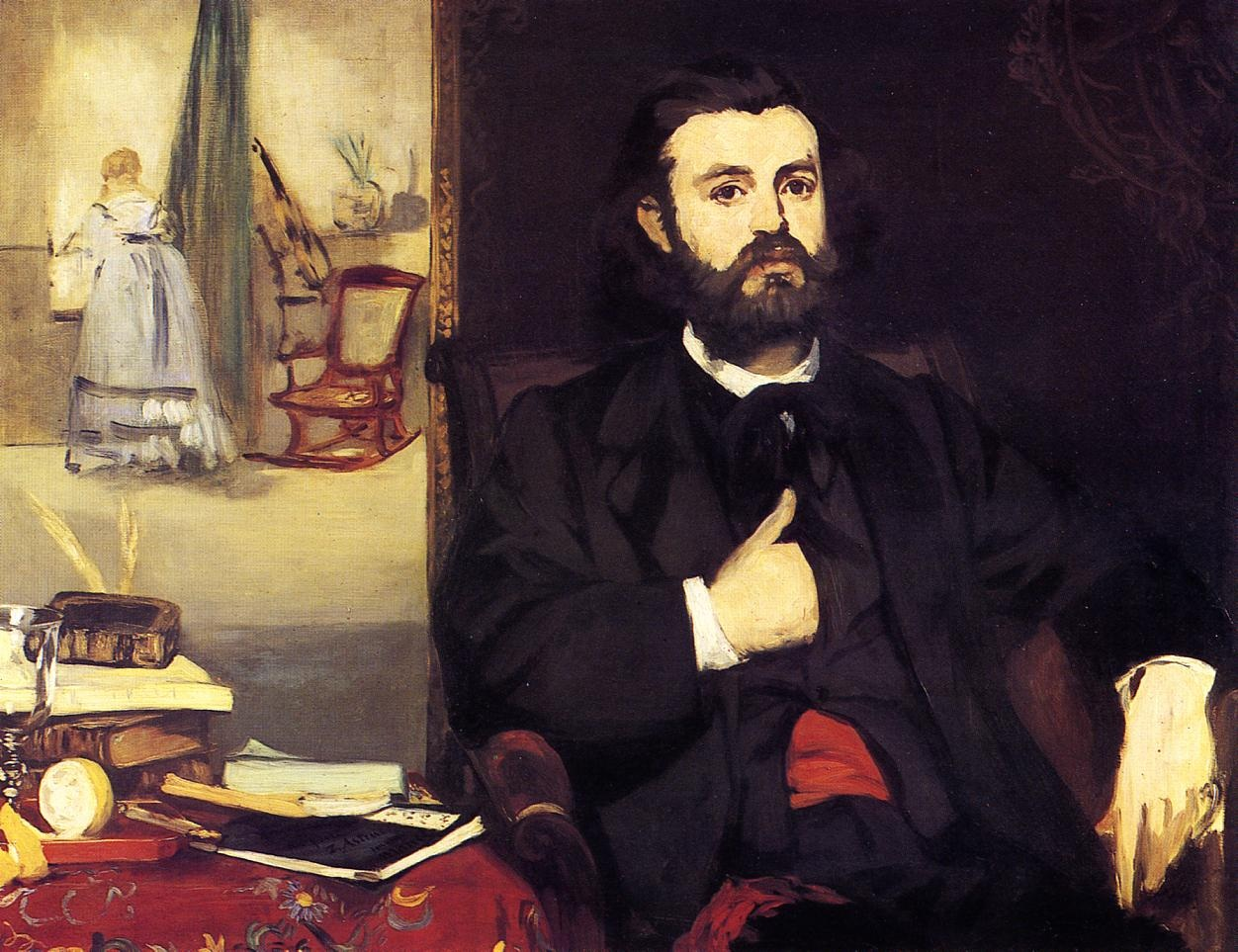
Portrait of Zacharie Astruc by Édouard Manet, 1866, Kunsthalle Bremen

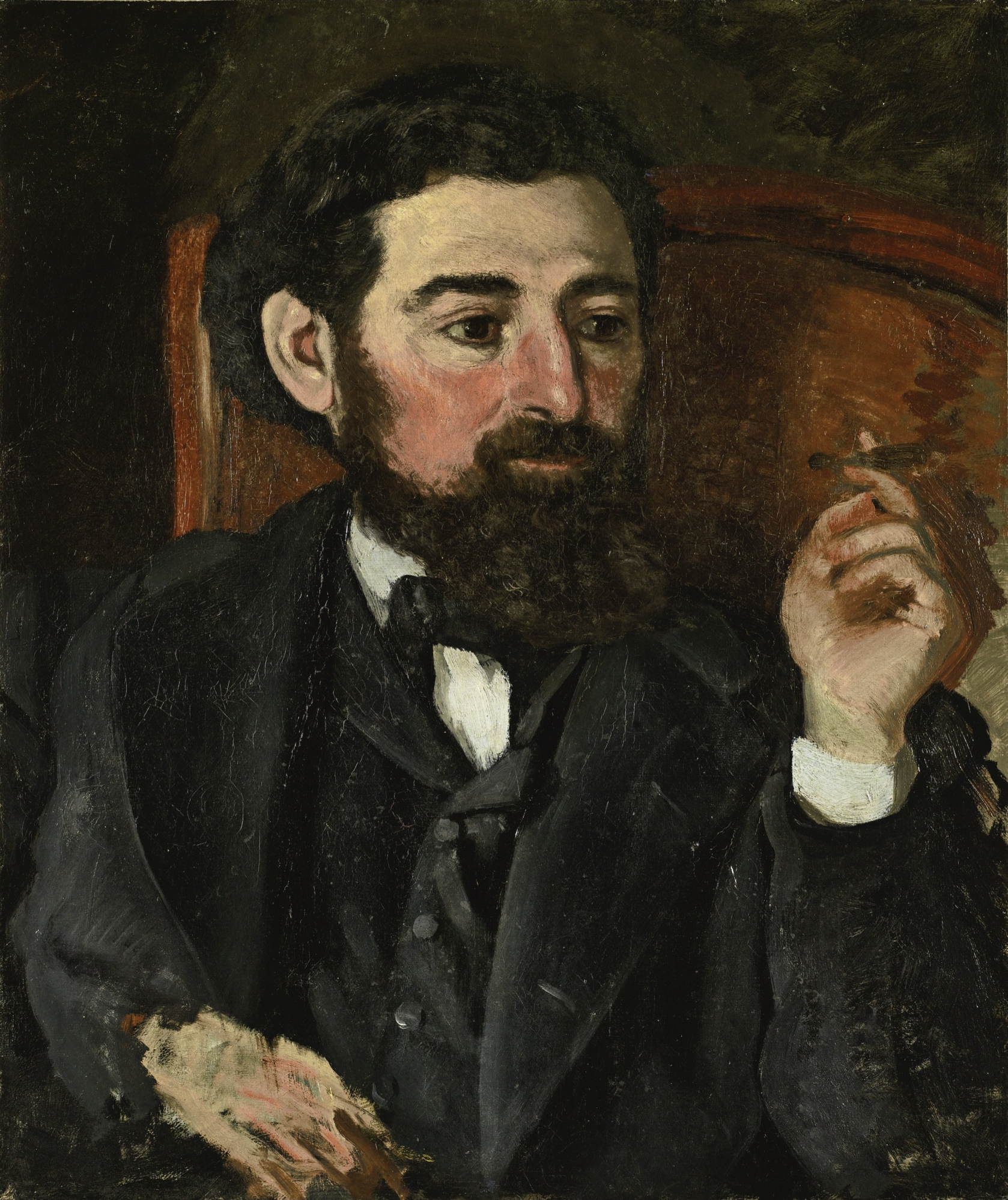
Portrait de Zacharie Astruc by Frédéric Bazille, 1869

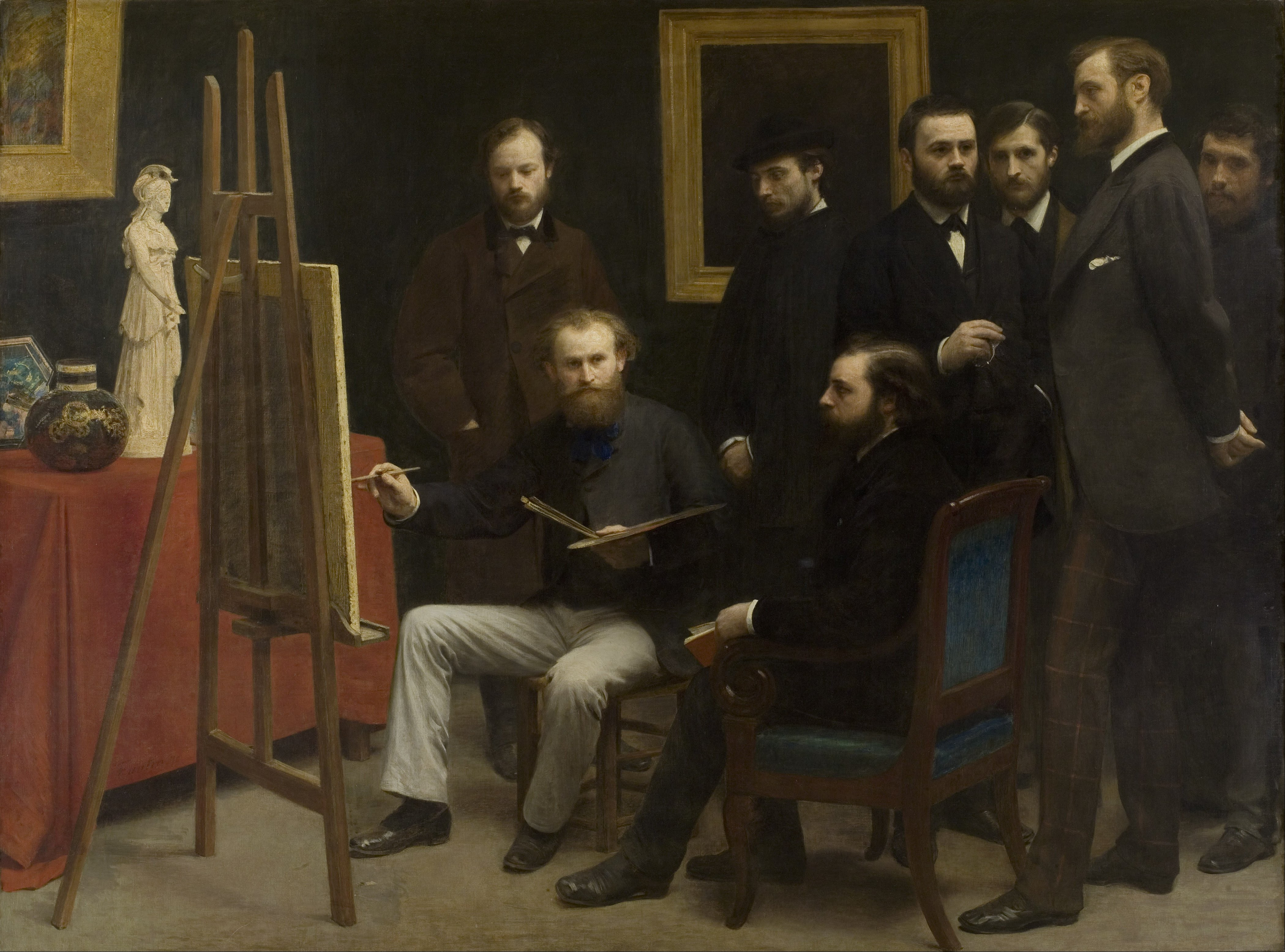
A Studio at Les Batignolles, Henri Fantin-Latour, 1870

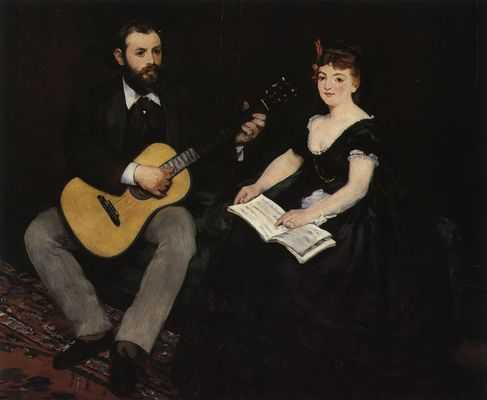
Music Lesson by Édouard Manet, 1870

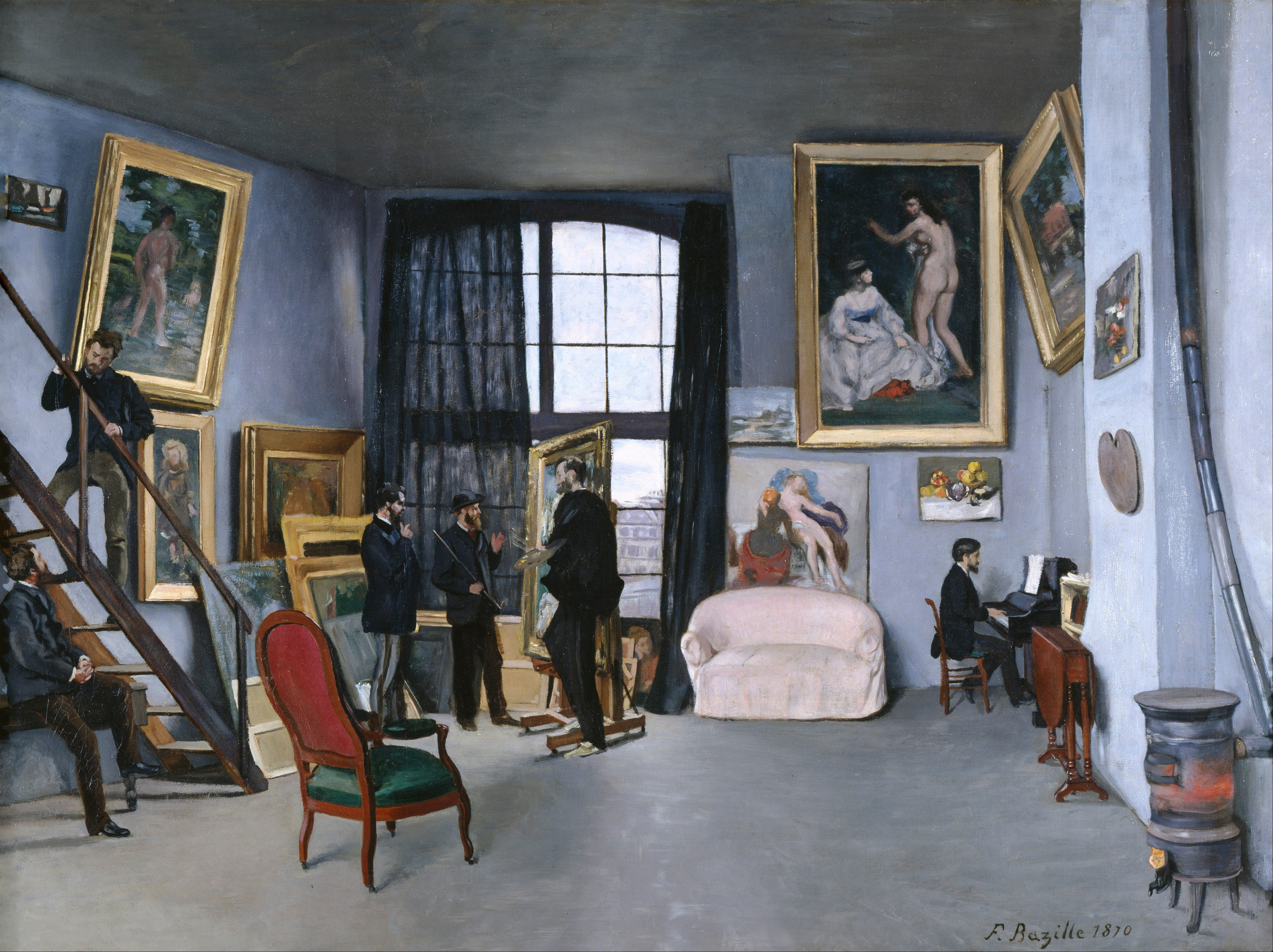
Bazille's Studio by Frédéric Bazille, 1870

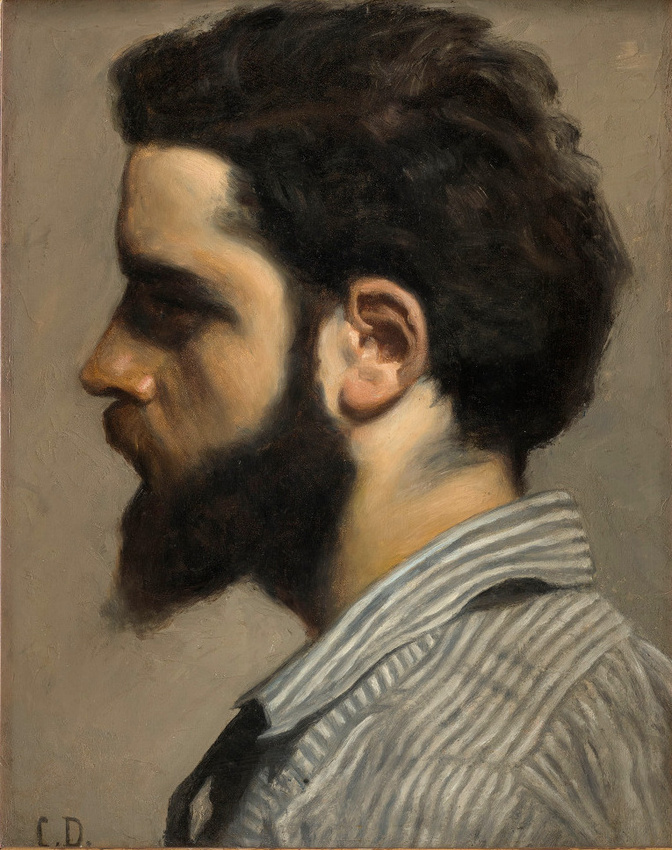
Zacharie Astruc, Carolus-Duran, 1861
