= Saint John the Baptist (El Greco) =

Painting by El Greco

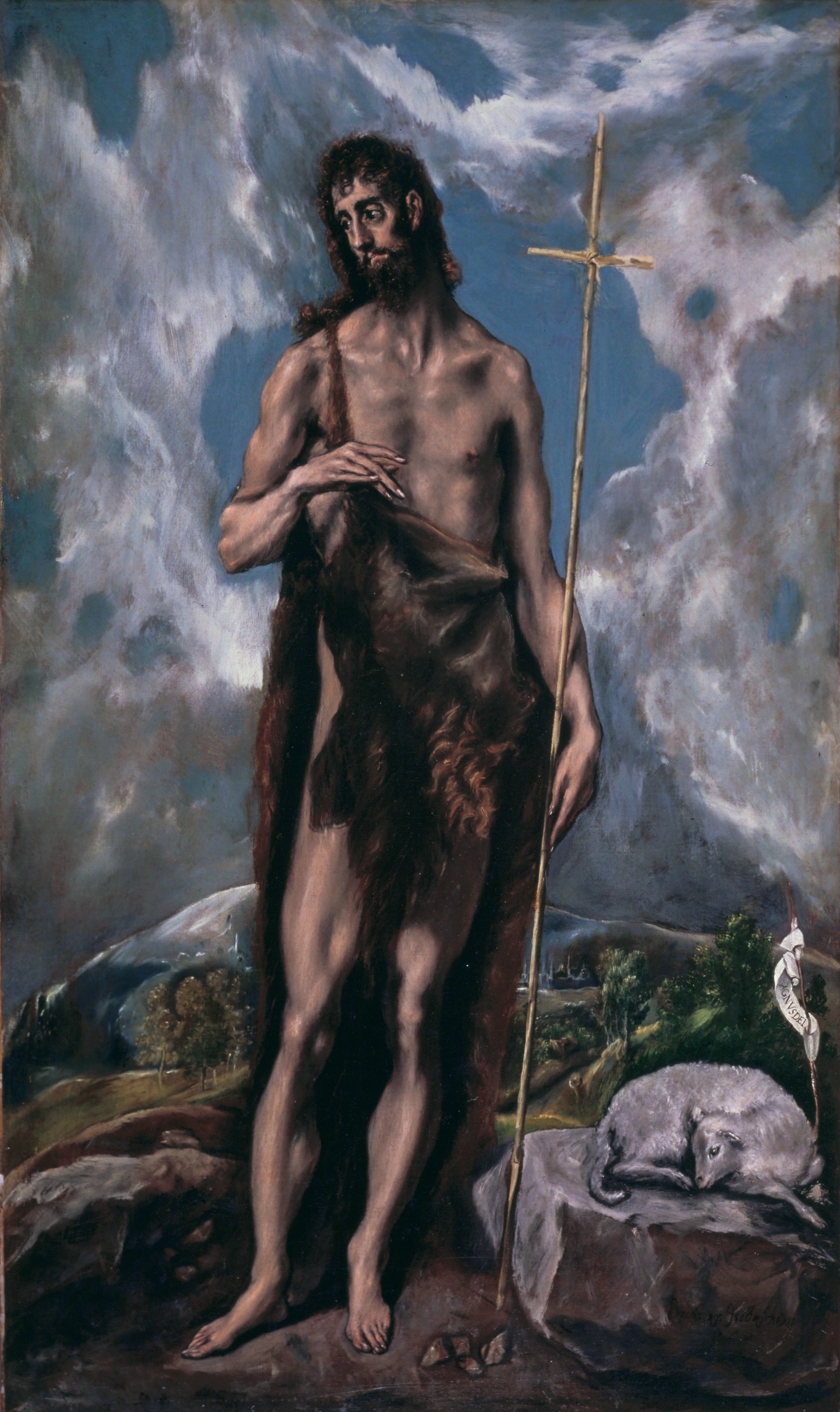
- Artist: El Greco
- Year: 1597–1607
- Medium: oil on canvas
- Dimensions: 111 cm × 66 cm (44 in × 26 in)
- Location: Legion of Honor Museum, San Francisco

Saint John the Baptist is an oil on canvas painting executed between 1597 and 1607 by the Greek artist El Greco whilst living in Spain. It is in the collection of the Legion of Honor museum, a component part of the Fine Arts Museums of San Francisco.

The painting depicts a young Saint John, dressed in animal skins, holding a long staff with a cross-shaped top. Beside him sleeps a lamb on a rock, representing the "Agnus Dei" (Lamb of God i.e. Jesus Christ), whose coming he prophesied. The work is autographed in cursive Greek script on a rock to his left. The clouds about his head resemble a halo. In the distance can be made out the monastery of El Escorial.

The work was once held by the Convento de San José in Malagón, Ciudad Real before passing via several private collections to the M. H. de Young Memorial Museum, part of the San Francisco Museum of Fine Arts, in 1946. The Young collection was transferred in 1972 to the Legion of Honor.

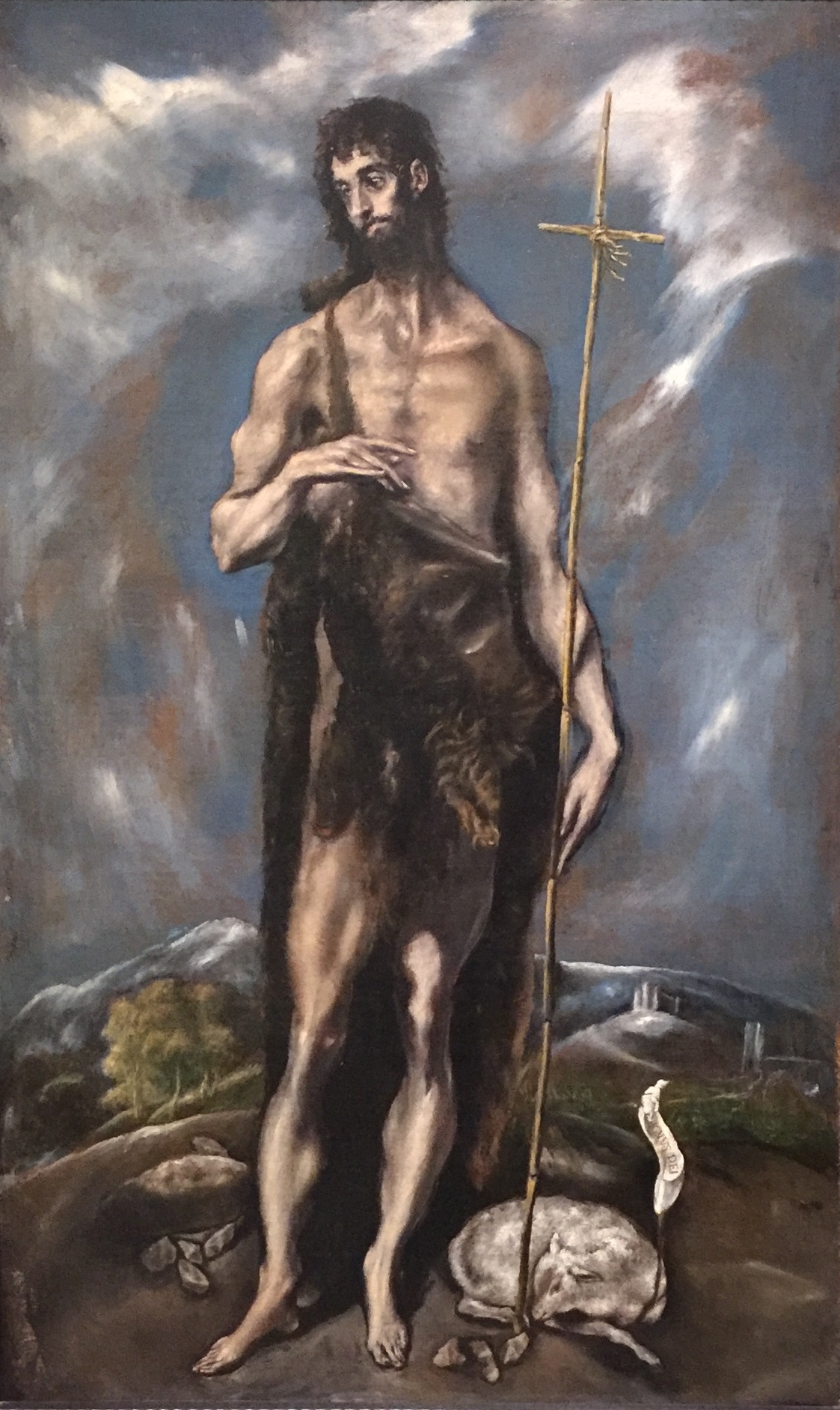
Saint John the Baptist, 1600–1605, Valencia

Another version of the painting (see left), differing in that some of the nearby rocks and distant background are absent, exists in the collection of the Museu de Belles Arts de València, Valencia, Spain.

== See also ==
- List of works by El Greco
