= John Maloof =

American film maker, cinematographer and screenwriter

John Maloof is an American filmmaker, photographer and author, who was nominated for best documentary feature film at the 2015 Oscars together with Charlie Siskel for their movie Finding Vivian Maier. He and Siskel were also nominated at the British Academy Film Awards in the category of Best Documentary. Maloof worked as a real estate agent in Chicago from 2005. He began to develop an interest in the city's history and became the president of the local historical society.

In 2007, while researching for his book Portage Park (co-authored with Daniel Pogorzelski), he accidentally discovered a box full of the work of the photographer Vivian Maier, who shot a vast amount of street photography throughout the 1950s and 1960s. Ever since, he has been the main curator of Maier's work and has released several books on her.

== Bibliography ==
- Portage Park (Images of America) (with Daniel Pogorzelski), Arcadia Publishing, 2008, ISBN 978-0738552293.
- Vivian Maier: Street Photographer powerHouse, Brooklyn, NY 2011, ISBN 978-1-57687-577-3. (Including a preface by Geoff Dyer)
- Vivian Maier: Self-Portraits powerHouse, Brooklyn, NY 2013, ISBN 978-1-57687-662-6.
- Vivian Maier: A Photographer Found (with Marvin Heiferman and Howard Greenberg) Harper Design, London 2014, ISBN 978-0-06230553-4. (Including a foreword by Laura Lippman)
