= Solen (band) =

Swedish indie pop band

- Origin: Gävle, Sweden
- Genres: Alternative rock, indie pop
- Years active: 2011–present
- Labels: Playground Music
- Members: Erik Hillborg; Nils Dahlqvist; Gustav Karlsson; Johan Kilström
- Past members: Olle Darmell
- Website: Official Facebook page

Solen (lit. "The Sun") is a Swedish indie pop band, formed in Gävle in 2011.

== History ==
Their debut album Solen came out in 2012. The second album Till dom som bryr sig came out in 2014 and put the band on the map in Sweden. The album was nominated for the 2015 Grammis Award for "Best Rock" album.

Solen was nominated again for a Grammis Award in the category "Best Rock" for their 2017 album Känslor säljer / Miljonär.

In 2021 Solen returned after three years of silence with the single "Mitt nya liv" and announced that Olle Darmell left the band in April 2019. In October 2023, their fifth album came out with the title Idol. Gaffa magazine gave the album a 5 out of 6 rating.

== Band members ==
Members

- Erik Hillborg – lead vocals, guitars (2011–present)
- Nils Dahlqvist – bass, keyboards (2011–present)
- Gustav Karlsson – guitars (2011–present)
- Johan Kilström – keyboards, guitars (2017–present)

Former members

- Olle Darmell – drums (2011–2019)

== Discography ==
=== Albums ===
- Solen (2012)
- Till dom som bryr sig (2014)
- Känslor säljer / Miljonär (2017)
- Totalmusik (2021)
- Idol (2023)
