= Copy stand =

Device for copying photos to a new negative

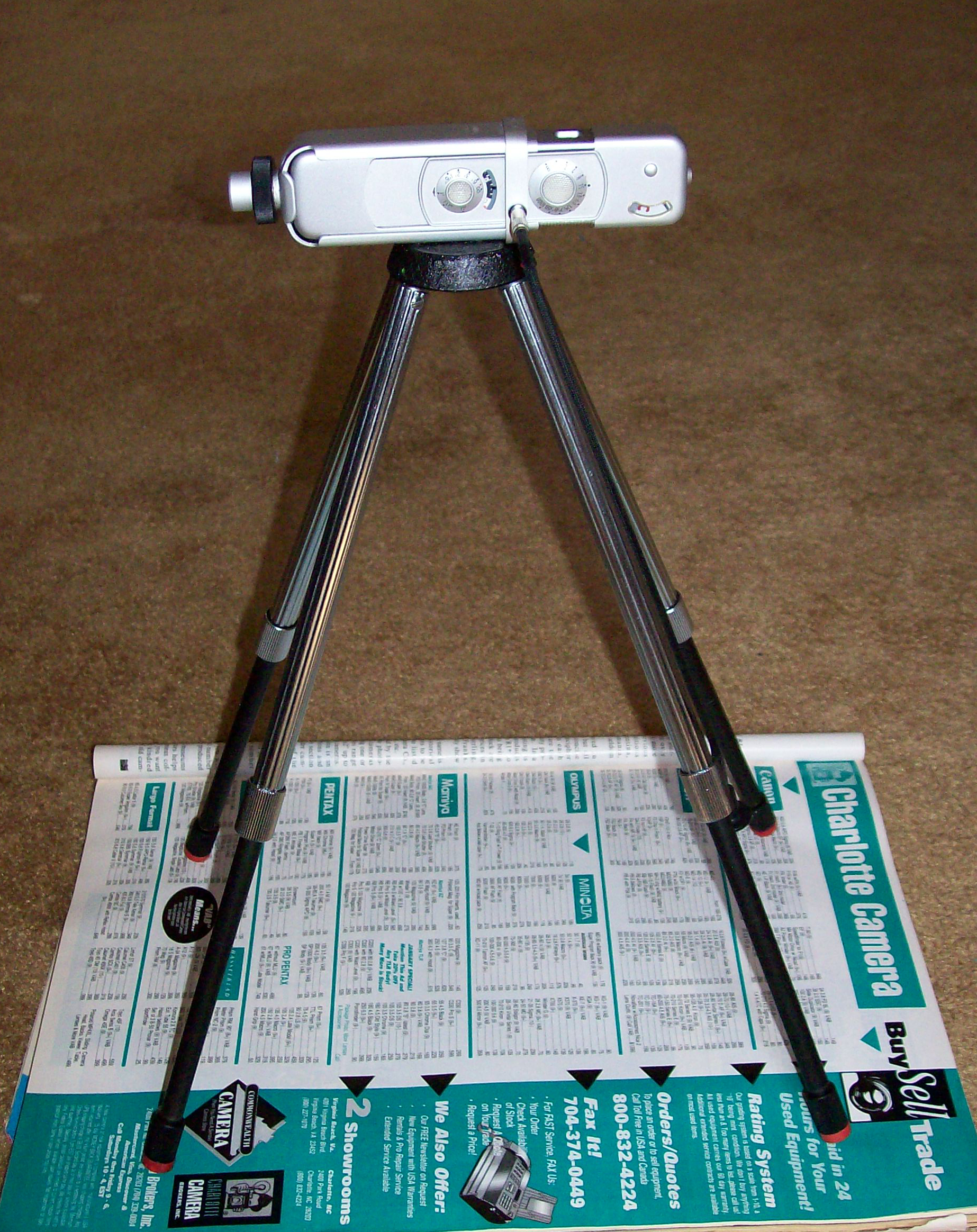
Minox copystand 12in

In photography, a copy stand is a device used to copy images and/or text with a camera. The stand consists of a board onto which the media is placed and an apparatus allowing the camera to be mounted parallel to it, usually with an adjustable height. Light is provided by bright lamps mounted on either side of the media at 45° angles. This provides uniform lighting and reduces specular reflection, keeping glare low.

In film cameras, copy stands are traditionally used with slide film. The fine resolution of slide film allows the images to be reproduced with high fidelity when they are projected.

== Reprography ==
Copy stands can be used for reprography (that is, to copy documents). To do so, the camera is mounted, usually with a standard 1/4" tripod-mount screw, onto the stand, pointing the lens down at the base, where the document to be copied would be placed.

== Forensics ==
Copy stands can be used in forensics to photograph evidence, in much the same way documents are reproduced. Evidence is brought to the lab, placed on the copy stand and recorded. Some copy stands designed for forensic use have ultraviolet light sources on them, to illuminate latent fingerprints.

== Animation ==
Copy stands are sometimes recommended as a low-cost alternative to a full-featured animation stand for traditional cel animation, especially when using small film formats such as Super 8.
