= Carl Wilhelm Correns =

German mineralogist and geochemist

- Born: May 19, 1893; Tübingen
- Died: August 29, 1980 (aged 87)
- Education: University of Tübingen; University of Münster
- Known for: pioneered the field of sedimentary petrology
- Awards: Roebling Medal of the Geological Society of America, 1976
- Scientific career
- Thesis: petrography and paleontology of Devonian limestone
- Doctoral advisor: J.F. Pompecki

Carl Wilhelm Correns (19 May 1893 – 29 August 1980) was a German mineralogist who pioneered the field of sedimentary petrology. He was noted as an influential teacher and for his textbook Einführung in die Mineralogie (1949). Correns received the Roebling Medal of the Geological Society of America in 1976.

Correns was born in Tübingen to botanists Carl Erich Correns and Elisabeth Widmer, a niece of ((Carl Naegeli)).((Erich Correns)) was his younger brother. He went to the University of Tübingen and the University of Münster with an interruption during World War I. After serving as a reserve officer, he returned to complete his PhD at the Friedrich Wilhelm University of Berlin in 1920. His thesis supervised by J.F. Pompecki was on petrography and paleontology of Devonian limestone. He was inspired by the book Lehrbuch der Mineralogie by Paul Niggli that he came across in Christmas of 1920 and attended seminars by Arrien Johnsen at the Friedrich Wilhelm University of Berlin. He was married in 1922 to Agnes Ballowitz, granddaughter of ((Hugo Pernice)). They had two children, Dieter(b. 1924) and Elisabeth(b. 1929). He joined the Prussian Geological Survey from 1922 to 1926 after serving as an assistant to Erich Kaiser at the Ludwig-Maximilians-Universität München. He then worked on colloidal chemistry under Herbert Freundlich at the Kaiser Wilhelm Institut and joined as Privatdozent at the Friedrich Wilhelm University of Berlin. In 1926, he joined the Meteor Expedition into the South Atlantic on the recommendation of Fritz Haber. He then joined the University of Rostock at the newly created department of geology and made use of X-ray diffraction to study minerals. He took a special interest in clay minerals, studying Mecklenburg soils and the ocean-bed core samples from the Meteor Expedition. He became a full professor in 1929. He was made head of the Institute for Sedimentary Petrology in 1939 and worked at the University of Göttingen until his death. He was noted for his teaching, mentoring nearly 61 doctoral students and his textbook Einführung in die Mineralogie (1949) was considered a landmark in geology. He also published Die Entstehung der Gesteine (1939) in which he examined the formation of sedimentary rocks.
