= Corren =

Corren is a surname. Notable people with the surname include:

- Carmela Corren (1938–2022), Israeli singer and actress
- Dean Corren (1955–2023), American politician
- Donald Corren (born 1952), American actor and screenwriter
- Mike Corren (born 1974), Australian squash player
- Peter and Murray Corren, Canadian couple

== See also ==
- Correns (surname)
- Corrin (surname)
- Östgöta Correspondenten
