= Carl Correns =

German botanist and geneticist (1864–1933)

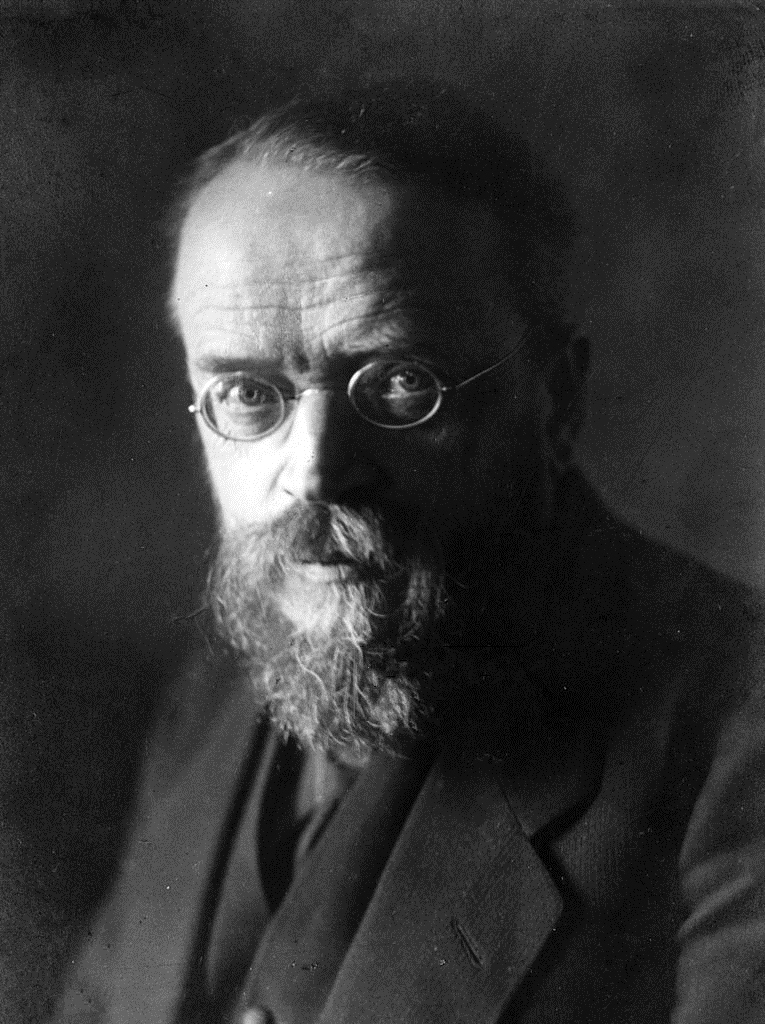
- Carl Correns in the 1910s
- Born: 19 September 1864; Munich, Kingdom of Bavaria
- Died: 14 February 1933 (aged 68); Berlin, Germany
- Education: Ludwig-Maximilians-Universität München
- Known for: Discovery of cytoplasmic inheritance
- Spouse: Elisabeth Widmer (niece of Karl Nägeli)
- Children: Carl Wilhelm, Erich, Anna-Eva
- Scientific career
- Fields: Botany, genetics
- Workplaces: University of Tübingen, Kaiser Wilhelm Institute for Biology
- Academic advisors: Karl Nägeli
- Author abbrev. (botany): Correns

Carl Erich Correns (19 September 1864 – 14 February 1933) was a German botanist and geneticist notable primarily for his independent discovery of the principles of heredity, which he achieved simultaneously but independently of the botanist Hugo de Vries, and for his acknowledgment of Gregor Mendel's earlier paper on that subject.

Correns was a student of Karl Nägeli, a renowned botanist with whom Mendel corresponded about his work with peas, and who subsequently engaged in a brief exchange of letters concerning reproducibility of the results in another species (Hieracium). Because of the special properties of Hieracium, those experiments failed and Mendel dropped his studies on the subject.

== Early life and education ==
Carl Correns was born on 19 September 1864 in Munich. Orphaned at an early age, he was raised by an aunt in Switzerland. He entered the Ludwig-Maximilians-Universität München in 1885. While there, he was encouraged to study botany by Carl Nägeli. After completing his thesis, Correns became a tutor at the University of Tübingen and in 1913, he became the first director of the newly founded Kaiser Wilhelm Institute for Biology in Berlin-Dahlem. He married a niece of Karl Nägeli, Elisabeth Widmer.

== Key experiments and findings ==
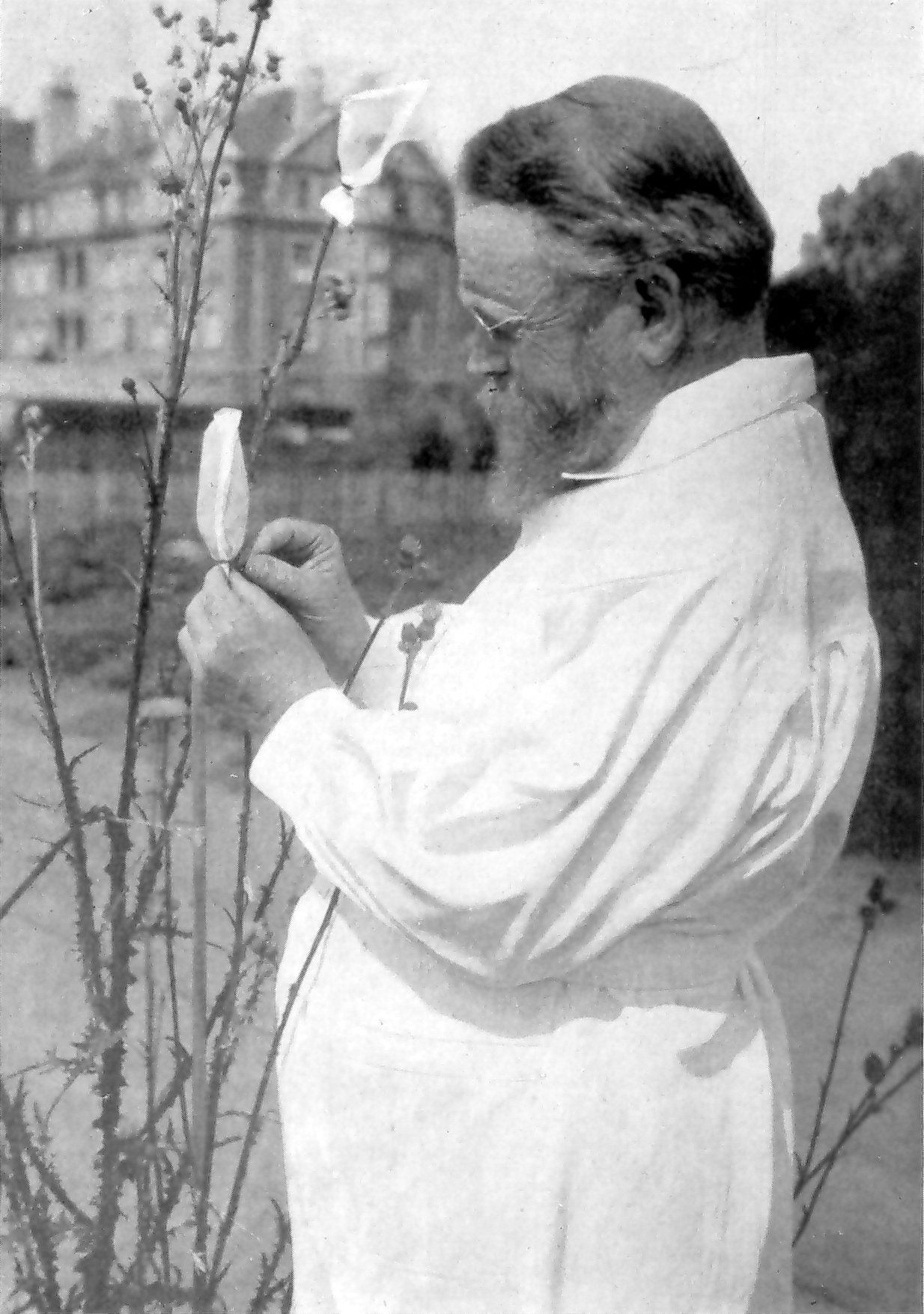
Carl Correns

Carl Correns conducted much of the foundational work for the field of genetics at the turn of the 20th century. He rediscovered and independently verified the work of Mendel in a separate model organism. He also discovered cytoplasmic inheritance, an important extension of Mendel's theories, which demonstrated the existence of extrachromosomal factors on phenotype. Some of his unpublished work and most of his lab books were destroyed in the Berlin bombings of 1945.

=== Rediscovery of Mendel ===
In 1892, while at the University of Tübingen, Correns began to experiment with trait inheritance in plants. Correns published his first paper on 25 January 1900, which cited both Charles Darwin and Mendel, recognising the relevance of genetics to Darwin's ideas. In Correns' paper, "G. Mendel's Law Concerning the Behavior of the Progeny of Racial Hybrids", he restated Mendel's results as the' law of segregation' and introduced a new 'law of independent assortment'.

=== Cytoplasmic inheritance ===
After rediscovering Mendel's laws of heredity, which can be explained with chromosomal inheritance, he undertook experiments with the four o'clock plant Mirabilis jalapa to investigate apparent counterexamples to Mendel's laws in the heredity of variegated (green and white mottled) leaf color. Correns found that, while Mendelian traits behave independently of the sex of the source parent, leaf color depended greatly on which parent had which trait. For instance, pollinating an ovule from a white branch with pollen from another white area resulted in white progeny, the predicted result for a recessive gene. Green pollen used on a green stigma resulted in all green progeny, the expected result for a dominant gene. However, if green pollen fertilized a white stigma, the progeny were white, but if the sexes of the donors were reversed (white pollen on a green stigma), the progeny were green.

This non-Mendelian inheritance pattern was later traced to a gene named iojap which codes for a small protein required for proper assembly of the chloroplast ribosome. Even though iojap assorts according to Mendel's rules, if the mother is homozygous recessive, then the protein is not produced, the chloroplast ribosomes fail to form, and the plasmid becomes non-functional because the ribosomes cannot be imported into the organelle. The progeny could have functional copies of iojap, but since the chloroplasts come exclusively from the mother in most angiosperms, they would have been inactivated in the previous generation, and so will give white plants. Conversely, if a white father is paired with a green mother with functional chloroplasts, the progeny will only inherit functional chloroplasts, and will thus be green. In his 1909 paper, he established variegated leaf color as the first conclusive example of cytoplasmic inheritance.

His son Carl Wilhelm became a geologist, his second son Erich a chemist, his daughter, Anna-Eva, a medical doctor.
