= List of street photographers =

This is a list of notable street photographers. Street photography is photography conducted for art or enquiry that presents unmediated chance encounters and random incidents within public places. Street photography does not need the backdrop of a street or even an urban environment. Though people are usually present, street photography may lack people and can be of an object or environment where the image projects a decidedly human character in facsimile or aesthetic.

== Street photographers ==
- Jun Abe (1955–)
- Berenice Abbott (1898–1991)
- Christophe Agou (1969–2015) (Note: Work by this photographer is presented in Sophie Howarth and Stephen McLaren, eds, Street Photography Now (London: Thames & Hudson, 2010, ISBN 978-0-500-54393-1; London: Thames & Hudson, 2011, ISBN 978-0-500-28907-5). The complete list of photographers introduced: Christophe Agou, Gary Alexander, Arif Aşçı, Narelle Autio, Bang Byoung-Sang, Polly Braden, Maciej Dakowicz, Carolyn Drake, Melanie Einzig, Peter Funch, George Georgiou, David Gibson, Bruce Gilden, Thierry Girard, Andrew Glickman, Siegfried Hansen, Cristóbal Hara, Markus Hartel, Nils Jorgensen, Richard Kalvar, Osamu Kanemura, Martin Kollar, Jens Olof Lasthein, Frederic Lezmi, Stephen McLaren, Jesse Marlow, Mirko Martin, Jeff Mermelstein, Joel Meyerowitz, Mimi Mollica, Trent Parke, Martin Parr, Gus Powell, Mark Alor Powell, Bruno Quinquet, Raghu Rai, Paul Russell, Boris Savelev, Otto Snoek, Matt Stuart, Ying Tang, Alexey Titarenko, Nick Turpin, Lars Tunbjörk, Jeff Wall, Munem Wasif, Alex Webb, Richard Wentworth, Amani Willett, Michael Wolf, Artem Zhitenev, Wolfgang Zurborn. See "The book ", Street Photography Now Project.)
- Daniel Arnold
- John Benton-Harris (1939–)
- Richard Bram (1952–)
- Lola Álvarez Bravo (1903–1993)
- Manuel Álvarez Bravo (1902–2002)
- Blake Andrews (1968–)
- Emmy Andriesse (1914–1953)
- Nobuyoshi Araki (1940–) (Note: Work by this photographer is presented in Kerry Brougher and Russell Ferguson, eds, Open City: Street Photographs since 1950 (Ostfildern: Hatje Cantz, 2001, ISBN 9783775710664; Oxford: Museum of Modern Art, 2001, ISBN 9781901352122); a book accompanying exhibitions at the Museum of Modern Art, Oxford, May–July 2001; The Lowry, Manchester, October 2001 – January 2002; Hirshhorn Museum, Washington DC, June–September 2002. The photographers introduced: Nobuyoshi Araki, Philip-Lorca diCorcia, Terence Donovan, William Eggleston, Nigel Henderson, William Klein, Nikki Lee, Susan Meiselas, Daidō Moriyama, Catherine Opie, Tazio Secchiaroli, Allan Sekula, Raghubir Singh, Beat Streuli, Thomas Struth, Wolfgang Tillmans, Jeff Wall, Garry Winogrand.)
- Diane Arbus (1923–1971) (Note: Work by this photographer is presented in Deborah Klochko and Andy Grundberg, eds, Streetwise: Masters of 60s Photography (San Francisco: Modernbook, 2010, ISBN 978-1-878062-00-0). The complete list of photographers introduced: Diane Arbus, Ruth-Marion Baruch, Jerry Berndt, Bruce Davidson, Robert Frank, Lee Friedlander, Danny Lyon, Garry Winogrand, Ernest Withers. The book accompanied an exhibition at the Museum of Photographic Arts, San Diego, February–May 2011. See W. S. Di Piero, "The way we were ", San Diego Reader, 11 May 2011; Barbara Schreiber, "Depth of field: Streetwise: Masters of 60s Photography ", Creative Loafing Charlotte, 6 December 2011.)
- Eugène Atget (1857–1927)
- Alice Austen (1866–1952)
- Narelle Autio (1969–)
- Shirley Baker (1932–2014)
- James Barnor (1929–)
- Ruth-Marion Baruch (1922–1997)
- Gianni Berengo Gardin (1930–)
- Lou Bernstein (1911–2005)
- Dimpy Bhalotia (1987–)
- Valentine Blanchard (1831–1901)
- Dorothy Bohm (1924–2023)
- Boogie (1969–)
- David Bradford (1951–)
- Adrian Bradshaw (1964–)
- Bill Brandt (1904–1983)
- Brassaï (1899–1984)
- Giacomo Brunelli (1977–)
- Harry Callahan (1912–1999)
- Henri Cartier-Bresson (1908–2004)
- Vivian Cherry (1920–2019
- Mark Cohen (1943–)
- Joan Colom (1921–2017)
- Martha Cooper (1943–)
- Ted Croner (1922–2005)
- Bill Cunningham (1929–2016)
- Maciej Dakowicz (1976–)
- Bill Dane (1938–)
- Bruce Davidson (1933–)
- Peter Dench (1972–)
- Raymond Depardon (1942–)
- Philip-Lorca diCorcia (1951–)
- Robert Doisneau (1912–1994)
- Ken Domon (1909–1990)
- Don Donaghy (1936–2008)
- Terence Donovan (1936–1996)
- Eamonn Doyle (1969–)
- Carolyn Drake (1971–)
- Nikos Economopoulos (1953–)
- William Eggleston (1939–)
- Melanie Einzig (1967–)
- Alfred Eisenstaedt (1898–1995)
- Martin Elkort (1929–2016)
- Ed van der Elsken (1925–1990)
- Morris Engel (1918–2005)
- Elliott Erwitt (1928–2023)
- Walker Evans (1903–1975)
- Louis Faurer (1916–2001)
- Harold Feinstein (1931–2015)
- Jed Fielding (1953–)
- Armet Francis (1945–)
- Robert Frank (1924–2019)
- Jill Freedman (1939–2019)
- Lee Friedlander (1934–)
- Cristina García Rodero (1949–)
- William Gedney (1932–1989)
- George Georgiou (1961–)
- David Gibson (1957–)
- Bruce Gilden (1946–)
- Shigeo Gochō (1946–1983)
- Henry Grant (1907–2004)
- Ken Grant (1967–)
- Michelle Groskopf
- Sid Grossman (1913–1955)
- Ara Güler (1928–2018)
- John Gutmann (1905–1998)
- George Hallett (1942–2020)
- Hiroshi Hamaya (1915–1999)
- Siegfried Hansen (1961–)
- John Harding (1940–)
- Tadahiko Hayashi (1918–1990)
- Dave Heath (1931–2016)
- Nigel Henderson (1917–1985)
- Anthony Hernandez (1947–)
- Fred Herzog (1930–2019)
- Fan Ho (1931–2016)
- Thomas Hoepker (1936–2024)
- Yasuhiro Ishimoto (1921–2012)
- Walter Joseph (1922–2003)
- James Jowers (1939–2009)
- Richard Kalvar (1944–)
- Osamu Kanemura (1964–)
- Peter Kayafas (1971–)
- Neil Kenlock (1950–)
- André Kertész (1894–1985)
- Hiroh Kikai (1945–2020)
- Ihei Kimura (1901–1974)
- Keizō Kitajima (1954–)
- William Klein (1928–2022)
- Martin Kollar (1971–)
- Josef Koudelka (1938–)
- Seiji Kurata (1945–2020)
- Kineo Kuwabara (1913–2007)
- Dorothea Lange (1895–1965)
- Sergio Larrain (1931–2012)
- Jacques-Henri Lartigue (1894–1986)
- Jens Olof Lasthein (1964–)
- Nikki S. Lee (1970–)
- Arthur Leipzig (1918–2014)
- Saul Leiter (1923–2013)
- Rebecca Lepkoff (1916–2014)
- Leon Levinstein (1910–1988)
- Helen Levitt (1913–2009)
- Feng Li (1971–)
- Jerome Liebling (1924–2011)
- David Lurie (1951–)
- Markéta Luskačová (1944–)
- Jon Luvelli (1979–)
- Danny Lyon (1942–)
- Vivian Maier (1926–2009)
- Jesse Marlow (1978–)
- Mary Ellen Mark (1940–2015)
- Roger Mayne (1929–2014)
- Paul McDonough (1941–)
- Stephen McLaren
- Susan Meiselas (1948–)
- Jeff Mermelstein (1957–)
- Joel Meyerowitz (1938–)
- Xavier Miserachs (1937–1998)
- Lisette Model (1901–1983)
- Mimi Mollica (1975–)
- Daidō Moriyama (1938–)
- Shigeichi Nagano (1925–2019)
- Masatoshi Naitō (1938–)
- Charles Nègre (1820–1880)
- Horace Nicholls (1867–1941)
- Colin O'Brien (1940–2016)
- Hildegard Ochse (1935–1997)
- Takayuki Ogawa (1938–2008)
- Mitsugu Ōnishi (1952–)
- Catherine Opie (1961–)
- Ruth Orkin (1921–1985)
- Graham Ovenden (1943–)
- Homer Page (1918–1985)
- Trent Parke (1971–)
- Martin Parr (1952–2025)
- Phil Penman (1977–)
- Charlie Phillips (1944–)
- Gus Powell (1974–)
- Mark Powell (1968–)
- Raghu Rai (1942–)
- Tony Ray-Jones (1941–1972)
- Marc Riboud (1923–2016)
- Henri Rivière (1864–1951)
- Willy Ronis (1910–2009)
- Paul Russell (1966–)
- Edward Linley Sambourne (1844–1910)
- Richard Sandler (1946–)
- Boris Savelev (1948–)
- Tazio Secchiaroli (1925–1998)
- Allan Sekula (1951–2013)
- Craig Semetko (1961–)
- Jamel Shabazz (1960–)
- Raghubir Singh (1942–1999)
- Aaron Siskind (1903–1991)
- Gary Mark Smith (1956–)
- David Solomons (1965–)
- Terry Spencer (1918–2009)
- Chris Steele-Perkins (1947–)
- Fred Stein (1909–1967)
- Joel Sternfeld (1944–)
- Louis Stettner (1922–2016)
- Alfred Stieglitz (1864–1946)
- Gary Stochl (1947–)
- Paul Strand (1890–1976)
- Beat Streuli (1957–)
- Christer Strömholm (1918–2002)
- Matt Stuart (1974–)
- Thomas Struth (1954–)
- Issei Suda (1940–2019)
- Wolfgang Suschitzky (1912–2016)
- Michael Ernest Sweet (1979–)
- Homer Sykes (1949–)
- Yutaka Takanashi (1935–)
- Takeyoshi Tanuma (1929–2022)
- Sam Tata (1911–2005)
- Elsa Thiemann (1910–1981)
- John Thomson (1837–1921)
- Wolfgang Tillmans (1968–)
- Alexey Titarenko (1962–)
- Toyoko Tokiwa (1928–2019)
- Lars Tunbjörk (1956–2015)
- Peter Turnley (1955–)
- Nick Turpin (1969–)
- Stephan Vanfleteren (1969–)
- David Vestal (1924–2013)
- Roman Vishniac (1897–1990)
- Jeff Wall (1946–)
- Dougie Wallace (1953–)
- Munem Wasif (1983–)
- Alex Webb (1952–)
- Weegee (1899–1968)
- Henry Wessel (1942–2018)
- William Whiffin (1878–1957)
- Garry Winogrand (1928–1984)
- Ernest Withers (1922–2007)
- Michael Wolf (1954–2019)
- Bernard Pierre Wolff (1930–1985)
- Tom Wood (1951–)
- Michio Yamauchi (1950–)
- Nakaji Yasui (1903–1942)
- Yau Leung (1941–1997)
- Max Yavno (1911–1985)
- Heinrich Zille (1858–1929)

== See also ==
- List of photographers
- List of photojournalists
