= Bystander: A History of Street Photography =

Book by Joel Meyerowitz and Colin Westerbeck

- First edition cover
- Author: Colin Westerbeck; Joel Meyerowitz
- Language: English
- Publisher: Little, Brown
- Publication date: 1994

Bystander: A History of Street Photography is a book by Colin Westerbeck and Joel Meyerowitz, first published in 1994. The survey of street photography includes essays and texts accompanied by illustrative photographs. It was revised and expanded in 2001 and again in 2017.

== Book content ==
The core of Bystander is "a roughly chronological survey of European/American street photography featuring its key innovators, styles, and trends". Westerbeck was responsible for the text, which includes "subjects like the ethics of photographing human suffering or role of images in shaping collective perception of events". In Blake Andrews' opinion, "the subtext to Westerbeck's thesis is that many of the facets driving street photography's current popularity — its simplicity, accessibility, honesty, and open-ended motivations — run counter to prevailing art world trends." Meyerowitz curated the images, of which there are "regularly spaced sections of twenty-plus pages with only photographs".

The 1994 edition includes work by photographers of the late 19th century and 20th century, including Eugène Atget, Stieglitz, Brassaï, André Kertész, Lewis Hine, Paul Strand, Henri Cartier-Bresson, Diane Arbus, Garry Winogrand, Helen Levitt, Robert Frank, Walker Evans, Robert Capa, Ben Shahn, Lucien Aigner, William Klein, Dan Weiner, Saul Leiter, Jeff Mermelstein, Jeff Mermelstein, Alex Webb, Martin Parr, Harry Gruyaert, Peter Kayafas, and Meyerowitz.

Bystander was republished in revised and expanded editions in 2001 and again in 2017. The 2001 edition, with the addition of the subtitle "with a new afterword on street photography since the 1970s", introduced contemporary street photographers such as Melanie Einzig and Gus Powell. For the 2017 edition Westerbeck said he "rewrote the entire book". This edition includes a re-evaluation of historical material, adds work by more photographers (including Richard Bram, Maciej Dakowicz, Vivian Maier, Trent Parke, Matt Stuart, Nick Turpin and others) and a new chapter which examines developments in the genre since 1994 and a discussion of the rise of digital photography.

== Reviews ==
In reviewing the book, Blake Andrews wrote of the 1994 and 2001 editions that "there's been a rush of street photography surveys published this millennium [. . .] But these have been primarily concerned with the contemporary. None have given street photography the historical framework and academic study that Bystander did." In Andrews' opinion of the photographs curated by Meyerowitz, "his choices are smart and enlightening." Of the 2017 edition, Andrews wrote that, given "the movement has grown so quickly it threatens to outstrip its own foundation [. . .] a lot is left uncovered. Indeed, wide swaths are missing completely. [. . .] Bystander is essentially a Eurocentric, white male survey [. . .] If the book were subtitled A History of Street Photography in Europe and the U.S. it would be no problem. But the actual subtitle, A History of Street Photography, promises more — too much, as it turns out. [. . .] Faults aside, Bystander is required reading for all street photographers."

== Publication details ==
- Bystander: A History of Street Photography. Boston; London: Bulfinch, 1994; ISBN 0-82121-755-0. London: Thames & Hudson; ISBN 9780500541906. By Colin Westerbeck and Joel Meyerowitz. Hardback.
- Bystander: A History of Street Photography: with a new afterword on street photography since the 1970s. Boston; London: Bulfinch, 2001. By Westerbeck and Meyerowitz. ISBN 9780821217559. Revised and expanded edition. Paperback.
- Bystander: A History of Street Photography. London: Laurence King, 2017. By Westerbeck and Meyerowitz. ISBN 978-1-78627-066-5. Revised and expanded edition. Hardback.

== See also ==
- List of street photographers
- Street Photography Now
