= Peter Kayafas =

American photographer (born 1971)

Peter Kayafas (born 1971) is an American photographer, publisher, and educator based in New York City. He creates black and white photographs that are "simple and spare, yet quietly overpowering with their evocation of a history on a scale beyond that of individual human lives."

Kayafas is the Director of the Eakins Press Foundation and is a Guggenheim Fellow in photography. He is Co-Chair of the Board of Directors of the Corporation of Yaddo and was an adjunct associate professor of photography at Pratt Institute for 21 years.

Kayafas' photographs are in the collections of the Museum of Modern Art, the Art Institute of Chicago, the New York Public Library, New Orleans Museum of Art, the Brooklyn Museum of Art, the RISD Museum, and SFMOMA, and there are five monographs of his photographs in print.

== Life and work ==
=== Early work ===
Kayafas was born in Boston in 1971 and raised in Concord, Massachusetts. His father, Gus Kayafas, founded the undergraduate photography program at Massachusetts College of Art, and his mother Arlette Kayafas, is the founder and owner of Gallery Kayafas in Boston. He moved to New York City in 1989 to study photography at New York University's Tisch School of the Arts, from which he received a BFA in 1993. During his college years, he worked as a printer for Rosalind Fox Solomon and Sylvia Plachy, and studied with Nan Goldin, Anthony Barboza, and A. D. Coleman. Kayafas spent the summer and fall of 1991 in San Francisco where he did an independent study with Henry Wessel, Jr. at the San Francisco Art Institute, and worked for Andy Grundberg at the Friends of Photography. In 1990, he met and began working for Leslie George Katz, founder and publisher of the Eakins Press. In 1993, Katz appointed Kayafas the Director of the press, a position he has continued for three decades.

=== Professional life ===
Kayafas' photographs have been published in five monographs: Peter Kayafas: Coney Island Waterdance (2021), Peter Kayafas: The Way West (2020), Totems (2012), O Public Road! Photographs of America (2009), and The Merry Cemetery of Sapanta (2007). His photographs have also been published in various magazines and journals—including DoubleTake Magazine and The Southern Review—as well as in photography books, including Bystander: A History of Street Photography (2001 and 2017), and The Spirit of Family by Al Gore and Tipper Gore (2002). Kayafas has had numerous solo exhibitions in New York City and Boston. In 2018 he became Co-Chair of the Board of Directors of the Corporation of Yaddo. In 2019, Kayafas was awarded a Guggenheim Fellowship for photography.

As a publisher and editor running the Eakins Press Foundation for three decades, Kayafas has produced books by photographers. He has been teaching photography at Pratt Institute since 2000, and has been represented by Sasha Wolf Projects since 2003.

=== Coney Island Waterdance ===
Coney Island Waterdance is a collection of photographs by Kayafas taken between the years of 1991 and 2002, which depicts swimmers in the summertime as well as the Polar Bear Club in the winter. A book featuring this work was published in 2021 by Purple Martin.

=== Cuba ===
Kayafas travelled to Cuba in 2000 and 2001. The New Yorker called his Cuba photographs "crisp and direct, and the best of them vibrate with understated graphic tension." Kayafas' pictures from Cuba were exhibited in Two Views of Cuba with photographer Lou Jones, at the DeCordova Museum in Lincoln, Massachusetts in 2002.

=== Romania ===
Romania is a collection of photographs that was made during several trips to Romania by Kayafas from 2003 to 2005. The collection was created by driving more than 10,000 kilometers and photographing the Romanian countryside and many Romanian cities. These photographs were exhibited at the Romanian Cultural Institute in New York City (2005) and the Romanian Embassy in Washington, DC (2006).

=== The Merry Cemetery of Sapanta ===
Designed by the Dutch designer Tessa van der Waals and produced in Holland in 2007, The Merry Cemetery of Sapanta is a book about the carved graves in the remote Merry Cemetery. There are photographs of the colorful tombstones and their respective epitaphs, with translations by Adrian Sahlean. The book also includes an essay by the Romanian scholar Sanda Golopentia. These photographs were exhibited at the Romanian Cultural Institute in New York City (2005) and the Romanian Embassy in Washington, DC (2006).

=== People In New York ===
Published in coordination with the Sasha Wolf Gallery in 2004, People In New York is an exhibition catalogue that includes a selection of 13 photographs by Kayafas of people on the streets and in the parks of New York City. The book includes a short essay on that common occurrence in the city: the familiar glance from a stranger.

=== O Public Road! ===
O Public Road! Photographs of America is a 2009 book of photographs published by Purple Martin. It features 160 pages of black and white photographs of landscapes, road signs, and people made by Kayafas during two decades of road trips across America. The book includes an essay by Allan Gurganus and a song by Eef Barzelay.

=== Totems ===
Totems is an exhibition and publication project by Kayafas that consists of photographs of abandoned buildings in the west that The New Yorker said "have both sculptural presence and a symbolic weight." The book Totems is a 2012 monograph by Kayafas, with an essay by art critic, Jed Perl. Of the Totems photographs, Perl writes: "Kayafas's explorations of an endangered vernacular architecture are at once straightforward records and unabashedly poetic meditations, a matter of the photographer testing the quality of his attentiveness against the facts on the ground. The lyric impulse is sharpened by the documentary convention."

=== Mexico City ===
Mexico City is a collection of photographs that were made by Kayafas between 2012 and 2016. Since more than half of Mexico City's 21 million people are under twenty-five, Kayafas chose to focus on various rituals of the youth sub-culture that are prevalent in many parts of the city.

=== The Way West ===
The Way West is a photographic project by Kayafas that includes exhibitions and a monograph. The book, Peter Kayafas: The Way West, is the third monograph of Kayafas' work photographing along the roads of the United States, released in 2020. It includes an essay by writer Rick Bass, as well as images from ten years and thousands of miles of travel in the Plains States of Idaho, Montana, Wyoming, North Dakota, South Dakota, Nebraska, Oklahoma, and Colorado. According to a review of the book in Hyperallergic from April 14, 2020: "Kayafas has come back with what surely constitutes one of the most exhaustive, vivid photographic studies of a region to be produced anywhere in recent decades."

== Publications ==
=== Books ===
- Kayafas, Peter; Jones, Lou (2002). Two Views of Cuba Photographs by Lou Jones and Peter Kayafas. Lincoln, Massachusetts: DeCordova Museum. LCCN 2001096810.
- Kayafas, Peter (2004). People In New York. New York, NY: Sasha Wolf Gallery and Purple Martin.
- Kayafas, Peter; Sahlean, Adrian; Golopentia, Sanda (2007). The Merry Cemetery of Sapanta. New York, NY: Purple Martin Press. ISBN 978-0-9797768-0-9.
- Kayafas, Peter; Gurganus, Allan; Barzelay, Eef (song) (2009). O Public Road!. New York, NY: Purple Martin. ISBN 978-0-9797768-1-6.
- Kayafas, Peter; Perl, Jed (2012). Totems. New York, NY: Purple Martin. ISBN 978-0-9797768-2-3.
- Kayafas, Peter; Bass, Rick (2020). The Way West. New York, NY: Purple Martin. ISBN 978-0-97977-683-0.
- Kayafas, Peter; (2021) Coney Island Waterdance New York, NY: Purple Martin ISBN 978-0-97977-684-7

=== Other publications ===
- The Spirit of Family, Albert and Tipper Gore. Holt, 2002
- Lincoln Kirstein: A Bibliography of Published Writings, edited by Kayafas. Eakins Press Foundation, New York, 2007
- CIRCUS: The Photographs of Frederick W. Glasier, edited by Kayafas and Deborah W. Walk. Eakins, New York, 2009
- THE AMERICANS LIST: By the Glow of the Jukebox (contributor), Red Hook, Brooklyn, 2012
- LEE FRIEDLANDER: THE PRINTED PICTURE. Edited by Stephen Hilger and Kayafas, The Pratt Photography Department and Libraries and Eakins, Brooklyn and New York, 2014
- 'O, Write My Name': American Portraits, Harlem Heroes, Photographs by Carl Van Vecthen, Edited by Leslie George Katz and Kayafas, Eakins, New York, 2015.
- PETER KAYAFAS: ECOS (exhibition catalogue), Universidad del Claustro de Sor Juana, Mexico City, 2016.
- Pilgrimage: Photographs by Mary Frank. Edited and sequenced by Mary Frank and Peter Kayafas, Eakins, New York, 2017.
- Bystander: A History of Street Photography, Joel Meyerowitz and Colin Westerbeck. Laurence King. London, 2017.
- Stephen Shore: Elements, Edited and sequenced by Stephen Shore and Kayafas, Eakins, New York, 2019.
- PhotoWork: Forty Photographers on Process and Practice, Edited by Sasha Wolf. Aperture, New York, 2019.
- Object Lesson: On the Influence of Richard Benson. (Contributor) Aperture, New York, NY 2022

== Exhibitions ==
=== Solo exhibitions ===
- ‘O Public Road’: Photographs by Peter Kayafas, Public Policy Research Center, University of Missouri, Saint Louis, 2001
- Two Views of Cuba: Photographs by Lou Jones & Peter Kayafas, the Decordova Museum and Sculpture Park, Lincoln, MA, 2002
- The Merry Cemetery of Sapanta and Selected Photographs of Romania, the Romanian Cultural Institute, New York, 2005
- An American in Romania: Photographs by Peter Kayafas, the Romanian Embassy, Washington, Dc, May 4-June 4, 2006
- Peter Kayafas: Recent Photographs of America, Sasha Wolf Gallery, New York, January–March 2008
- Peter Kayafas: Totems, Sasha Wolf Gallery, New York, May–July 2011
- Peter Kayafas: Totems, Gallery Kayafas, Boston, January–February 2012
- The Way West: Photographs by Peter Kayafas, Sasha Wolf Gallery, New York, April–June 2014
- Peter Kayafas: Ecos, Universidad Del Claustro De Sor Juana, Mexico City, March–May 2016
- Coming of Age in the West, Photographs by Peter Kayafas, the Century Association, New York, March–April 2017

=== Group exhibitions ===
- Straight Arrows (Group Show), Ariel Meyerowitz Gallery, New York, 2001
- The Sidewalk Never Ends (Group Show), Art Institute of Chicago, 2002
- Alone: Images of Isolation from the Permanent Collection (Group Show), the DeCordova Museum and Sculpture Park, Lincoln, MA, 2002
- Gotham: Photographs of New York (Group Show), Fitchburg Art Museum, Fitchburg, MA, 2002
- Vernacular Territory: Photographs by George Tice, Kate Schermerhorn & Peter Kayafas, Ariel Meyerowitz Gallery, New York, 2005
- Moving Through New England (Group Show), the Decordova Museum, Lincoln, Massachusetts, October–September 2007
- Photographs of Children from the Permanent Collection (Group Show), the DeCordova Museum and Sculpture Park, Lincoln, Massachusetts February–April 2008
- In Our Dreams (Group Show), Sasha Wolf Gallery, New York, June–August 2008
- Signs: Wordplay in Photography (Group Show), De Young Museum, San Francisco, Ca., January–June, 2009
- Residents & Visitors: 20th Century Photographs of Louisiana (Group Show), New Orleans Museum of Art, November, 2011
- AIPAD Photography Show (Sasha Wolf Gallery) (Group Show), the Armory, New York, March–April 2012
- AIPAD Photography Show (Sasha Wolf Gallery) (Group Show), the Armory, New York, April 3-April 6, 2013
- Group Exhibition: The Drinking Show, Sasha Wolf Gallery, New York, July 10-August 16, 2013
- Romeo & Juliet in Pictures: A Group Show, Sasha Wolf Gallery, New York, June–August 2014
- The Collected Image: Photography Portfolios, Fitchburg Art Museum, Fitchburg, Massachusetts, October 2018 – August 2019
- Unlimited: Recent Gifts from the William Goodman and Victoria Belco Photography Collection (Group Show Curated by Sandra Phillips), UC Berkeley Art Museum and Pacific Rim Archive, Berkeley, California, March–September 2019

== Collections ==
Kayafas' work is held in the following public collections:

- Art Institute of Chicago, Chicago, IL
- Brooklyn Museum of Art, Brooklyn, NY
- DeCordova Museum, Lincoln, MA
- Fidelity, Boston, MA
- Joy of Giving Something (Dreyfus) Collection
- Museum of the City of New York, NY
- Museum of Modern Art, New York, NY
- Nevada Museum of Art, Reno, NV
- New Orleans Museum of Art, New Orleans, LA
- New York Public Library, New York, NY
- Rhode Island School of Design Museum, Providence, RI
- San Francisco Museum of Modern Art, San Francisco, CA
- UC Berkeley Art Museum, Berkeley, CA
