= Melanie Einzig =

American street photographer

Melanie Einzig (born 1967) is an American photographer known for her street photography in and around New York City, where she has lived since 1990. Einzig was a member of the first incarnation of the In-Public street photography collective, from 2002. Her work has been published in the survey publications on street photography, Bystander: A History of Street Photography and Street Photography Now. She has shown in group exhibitions at the Art Institute of Chicago; Somerset House in London; the Deichtorhallen in Hamburg, Germany; and KunstHausWien in Vienna, Austria. The Art Institute of Chicago and Brooklyn Historical Society hold examples of her work in their collections.

== Life and work ==
Einzig was born in Los Angeles, California and grew up in the suburbs of Minneapolis, Minnesota. Attended the University of Wisconsin-Madison in the 1980s and then moved to New York City in 1990 to become an artist and studied photography at New York University/International Center of Photography, focusing on computer-generated imagery and filmmaking. She worked for Associated Press in New York City from 1998 to 2002 then as a self-employed event photographer. She was a member of the first incarnation of the In-Public street photography collective, from 2002.

In the book Street Photography Now, Howarth and McLaren write that "Einzig wanders the city that has been her home since 1990, sniffing out eccentric characters and tuning into tiny little plays that spontaneously erupt on city corners. [. . .] Einzig is a whimsical anthropologist whose seemingly arbitrary samplings show up sharp revelations". Lucy Sante is quoted in the same publication as saying "Einzig represents the very ideal of the street photographer. She's alert, funny, sympathetic, quick-witted, drily romantic". Her photograph titled "September 11th, New York, 2011" was included in the Cartier-Bresson: A Question of Colour exhibition at Somerset House in London in 2012/2013. Harry Eyres' review in the Financial Times considered the photograph "[p]erhaps the most dramatic single image in the Somerset House exhibition [. . .] a brilliant, unforgettable photograph..." Nancy Durrant in The Times wrote that "[i]n some ways the most powerful shot is Melanie Einzig's study on 9/11 in New York" and Emily Luxton for HuffPost also considered it "[o]ne of the images which stands out the most" (despite being "one of the smallest").

== Publications with contributions by Einzig ==
- Bystander: A History of Street Photography: with a new afterword on street photography since the 1970s. By Colin Westerbeck and Joel Meyerowitz. Boston, MA: Bulfinch, 2001; ISBN 9780821217559. Bystander: a History of Street Photography. London: Laurence King, 2017; ISBN 978-1-78627-066-5.
- Cartier-Bresson: A Question of Colour. By William Ewing. London: Positive View Foundation, 2012. OCLC 913427536.
- 10 – 10 Years of In-Public. London: Nick Turpin, 2010. ISBN 978-0-9563322-1-9. Includes an essay by Jonathan Glancey, "Outlandish Harmony"; a foreword by Turpin; and chapters by Einzig and others.
- Street Photography Now. London: Thames & Hudson, 2010. ISBN 978-0-500-54393-1. Edited by Sophie Howarth and Stephen McLaren.
- New York in Color. New York City: Abrams, 2011. By Bob Shamis. ISBN 978-1419700613.
- Read This if You Want to Take Great Photographs. By Henry Carrol. London: Laurence King, 2014. ISBN 978-1780673356.
- Seeing Things: A Kid's Guide to Looking at Photographs. By Joel Meyerowitz. New York: Aperture, 2016. ISBN 978-1-59711-315-1.

== Exhibitions ==
=== Solo exhibitions ===
- New York City Street Photos Stadthaus ULM, Ulm, Germany, 2021/22

=== Group exhibitions ===
- The Sidewalk Never Ends: Street Photography Since the 1970's, Art Institute of Chicago, Chicago, IL, 2001/2002
- Common Ground: Photographers on the Street, McMullen Museum of Art, Boston College, Brighton, Massachusetts, 2003; Tufts University Art Gallery, Tufts University, Medford / Somerville, Massachusetts, 2003
- in-public @ 10, Photofusion, Brixton, London, 2010; Les Ballades Photographiques de Seyssel, Seyssel, France, July 2011. Photographs by In-Public members.
- Street Photography Now, Third Floor Gallery, Cardiff, 2010; Contributed Studio for the Arts, Berlin, 2010/2011; Museum of Printing, Historical Museum of Warsaw, Warsaw, 2011/2012. Photographs from the book Street Photography Now (2010).
- Derby Museum and Art Gallery, Format International Photography Festival (Right Here, Right Now – Exposures From The Public Realm), Derby, UK, 2011. Photographs by In-Public members and the film In-Sight (2011).
- Cartier-Bresson: A Question of Colour, Somerset House, London, 2012/2013. Curated by William Ewing.
- iN-PUBLiC: An Exhibition of Street Photography, Thailand Creative and Design Centre, Bangkok, Thailand, 2013. In conjunction with the British Council. Photographs by In-Public members.
- In Public, Snickarbacken 7, Stockholm, Sweden, 2013. Photographs by In-Public members.
- The Sharp Eye. In-Public in Mexico, Foto Mexico, Cine Tonalá, Mexico City, Mexico, 2015. Slideshow of photographs by In-Public members. Curated by Mark Powell, Carlos Álvarez Montero and Alfredo Esparza.
- ? The Image as Question, Michael Hoppen Gallery, London, 2016
- Street. Life. Photography: Seven Decades of Street Photography, Deichtorhallen, Hamburg, Germany, 2018, during Triennial of Photography; KunstHausWien, Vienna, Austria, 2019/2020

== Collections ==
Einzig's work is held in the following permanent collections:

- Art Institute of Chicago, Chicago, IL: 6 prints (as of July 2020)
- Brooklyn Historical Society, Brooklyn, NY

== Awards ==
- 1997: Aaron Siskind Foundation Individual Photographer's Fellowship

== Films ==
- In-Sight (2011) – 38 min documentary directed and edited by Nick Turpin, commissioned by Format for Format International Photography Festival, Derby, 2011. Includes an interview with Einzig, among others.
