= Gus Powell =

American street photographer

Gus Powell (1974) is an American street photographer. He was a member of the In-Public street photography collective.

Powell has published two of his own photography books: The Company of Strangers (2003) and The Lonely Ones (2015), the latter with work spanning a decade. He has had a solo exhibition at Museum of the City of New York and his work is held in the permanent collections of the Art Institute of Chicago, Museum of Fine Arts Houston, and Foam Fotografiemuseum Amsterdam. In 2003 Photo District News considered Powell one of their 30 emerging photographers to watch, and in 2013 he won an award in the National Magazine Awards.

== Life and work ==
Powell was born in New York City in 1974. He became a member of the In-Public street photography collective in 2003.

His photographs are regularly published in The New Yorker.

== Publications ==
=== Publications by Powell ===
- The Company of Strangers. Atlanta and New York: J&L, 2003.
- The Lonely Ones. Atlanta and New York: J&L, 2015.
- Family Car Trouble. TBW, 2019. ISBN 978-1-942953-39-5. Edition of 940 copies.

=== Publications with contributions by Powell ===
- Bystander: A History of Street Photography. Second edition. Boston: Bulfinch, 2001. By Joel Meyerowitz and Colin Westerbeck. ISBN 0-8212-2726-2. Paperback.
  - Revised and expanded edition. London: Laurence King, 2017. ISBN 978-1-78627-066-5. Hardback.
- Here is New York: A Democracy of Photographs. Scalo, 2002. ISBN 978-3908247661. Includes seven photographs by Powell.
- A Field Guide To The North American Family. New York City: Mark Batty, 2007. By Garth Risk Hallberg. ISBN 978-0977985098.
- 10 – 10 Years of In-Public. London: Nick Turpin, 2010. ISBN 978-0-9563322-1-9. Includes an essay by Jonathan Glancey, "Outlandish Harmony"; a foreword by Nick Turpin; and a chapter each by Powell and others.
- Street Photography Now. London: Thames & Hudson, 2010. ISBN 978-0-500-54393-1 (hardback). London: Thames & Hudson, 2011. ISBN 978-0-500-28907-5 (paperback). Edited by Sophie Howarth and Stephen McLaren.
- The Street Photographer's Manual. London: Thames & Hudson, 2014. ISBN 978-0-500-29130-6. By David Gibson.

== Awards ==
- 2003: One of Photo District News's "PDN 30 2003," one of 30 emerging photographers to watch
- 2013: Feature Photography category, National Magazine Awards, New York. One of a few winners, for photography in New York magazine

== Solo exhibitions ==
- Manhattan Noon, Museum of the City of New York, New York, December 2007 – April 2008.
- The Lonely Ones, Galerie Ghezelbash & Motte Masselink, Paris, France, November, 2015; Sasha Wolf Gallery, New York, January, 2016; Micamera, Milan, Italy, April, 2016.
- Bloomberg Philanthropies Public Art Project, Spartanburg Art Museum, Spartanburg, South Carolina, March 2018 - May 2018.

== Collections ==
Powell's work is held in the following permanent collections:

- Art Institute of Chicago: 1 print
- Museum of Fine Arts Houston: 1 print
- Foam Fotografiemuseum Amsterdam

== Film ==
- In-Sight (2011). 38 minute documentary directed and edited by Nick Turpin, commissioned by Format for the Format International Photography Festival, Derby, 2011. Includes interviews with Powell and others, and shows him at work. (Note: The film is available to watch here within Turpin's site.)
