= Jowers =

Jowers is a surname. Notable people with the surname include:

- Christine Jowers, American dancer, teacher, producer and dance critic
- James Jowers (1939–2009), American street photographer
- Loyd Jowers (1926–2000), American restaurateur
- Milton Jowers (1914–1972), American football and basketball coach and college athletics administrator
