= Jane Mayhall =

American poet

Jane Mayhall in an undated photograph provided by her family

Jane Mayhall Katz (May 10, 1918 – March 17, 2009) was an American poet whose writing first received attention later in life, and was influenced by her transition from her youth in Kentucky to the hustle and bustle of life in New York City and her grief over the death of her husband. Her poems and other works had been published over the years in many publications, including The New York Times and The New Yorker.

== Personal life and education ==
Mayhall grew up in Louisville, Kentucky, where she was born on May 10, 1918. She attended Black Mountain College in North Carolina, where she majored in music, having entered as a talented composer, pianist and singer. There she met fellow student Leslie George Katz. The two married in the 1940s and moved to New York City. With her husband, she was an active participant in New York's bohemian community starting in the 1950s, and became friendly with many of the prominent artists at the time. Her husband founded Eakins Press, which published art and literature, including some of Mayhall's works.

== Career ==
Her debut novel Cousin to Human was published by Harcourt, Brace in 1960, telling the story of a girl growing up in Louisville. Florence Crowther's review of the book in The New York Times describes how "less adept" authors would have been challenged to make the story believable, but that "Miss Mayhall is a wise author - she has Lacy keep her mouth shut and yet be understood." Her husband's Eakins Press published her 1966 book of plays, poems and stories Ready for the Ha Ha & Other Satires, and the two-volume collection of poetry Givers and Takers that was published in 1968 and 1973.

Her collection of poems Sleeping Late on Judgment Day was published by Alfred A. Knopf in 2004 when she was 85 years old. Many of the works included in the book reflected her grief after the death of her husband, described by Andy Bruner of The New York Times as including "pain so private in its specificity that it threatens to repel the reader's empathy", while other pieces she "turns away from her sorrow and offers poems with philosophical insights into love and its inevitable loss".

Mayhall died at age 90 on March 17, 2009, in her Manhattan home. She had no immediate survivors.
