= Jed Fielding =

American street photographer

Jed Robert Fielding (born 1953) is an American street photographer, based in Chicago. His work has concentrated on the Italian cities of Rome and Naples, as well as Mexico City. He has published the monographs City of Secrets: Photographs of Naples (1997), Look at me: Photographs from Mexico City (2009), and Encounter: Photographs by Jed Fielding (2022).

== Life and work ==
Fielding was born in Boston, Massachusetts. He attended the Rhode Island School of Design, where he studied with photographers Aaron Siskind and Harry Callahan; he received his BFA in 1975. He received his MFA in 1980 from the School of the Art Institute of Chicago, where he studied with photographer Kenneth Josephson.

He has photographed in such countries as Italy, Peru, Spain, Greece, Egypt, Mexico, Portugal and the United States. His work has particularly concentrated on the Italian cities of Rome and Naples, as well as Mexico City.

Of Fielding's City of Secrets, critic Vince Aletti wrote:

[Naples'] citizens, from wiseass kids in diapers to weathered old men, loom into the frame like characters out of Fellini, bursting with antic, earthy energy. Fielding confronts and embraces his subjects, building up a portrait of a place that's as visceral as it is cinematic--a true theatre of the streets.

Photography curator and collector W. M. Hunt wrote about the book:

Jed Fielding is from the old school: a photographer with vision and technique. I've been to Naples twice in my lifetime; once by ship, and, even more lastingly, through Jed Fielding's astonishing images.

At the time of a 2009 New York City exhibition of Fielding's photographs from Look at me, a New Yorker review said:

Fielding's photographs of the blind children he met at schools in Mexico City are not in the tradition of photojournalistic muckraking. Like his terrific earlier series from the streets of Naples, these images are vivacious, audacious, and in your face. His subjects are not pitiable victims; they're rambunctious, apparently happy kids at play, responding to Fielding's attention with curiosity and delight. They may be cut off from the visual world, but they relish physical contact, both with one another and with the patient photographer. The best of the work was made at close range, where that connection was most tangible, and young faces fill the frames with fragile, vivid life.

He has had solo exhibitions at venues including the Andrea Meislin Gallery, New York, NY (2009); Chicago Cultural Center (2009); and Verso Photo Gallery, Tokyo, Japan (1999).

His exhibition, "Encounter: Photographs by Jed Fielding," opened at San Diego's Museum of Photographic Arts (MOPA) on March 12, 2022, and ran until September 25, 2022. A monograph by Fielding—with the same title as the 2022 exhibition—was published by the Museum of Photographic Arts, in conjunction with the exhibition.

== Publications ==
- City of Secrets: Photographs of Naples. New York and Tokyo: Takarajima; Chicago: Museum of Contemporary Photography, 1997. Essays by Shirley Hazzard and Nan Richardson. ISBN 978-0965888707.
- Look at me: Photographs from Mexico City. Chicago: University of Chicago Press, 2009. Foreword by Alan Thomas; introduction by Britt Salvesen; essay by Vince Aletti. ISBN 978-0226248523.
- Encounter: Photographs by Jed Fielding. San Diego: Museum of Photographic Arts, 2022. Essay, "Intimacy of Strangers," by Deborah Klochko; and, "Dialogue: Conversation between Stephanie Lipscomb and Jed Fielding." ISBN 978-1-878062-12-3.

== Collections ==
- International Center of Photography (New York)
- Museum of Contemporary Photography (Chicago)
- Art Institute of Chicago
- Walker Art Center (Minneapolis)
- Center for Creative Photography (Tucson)
