= Elie Nadelman =

American sculptor

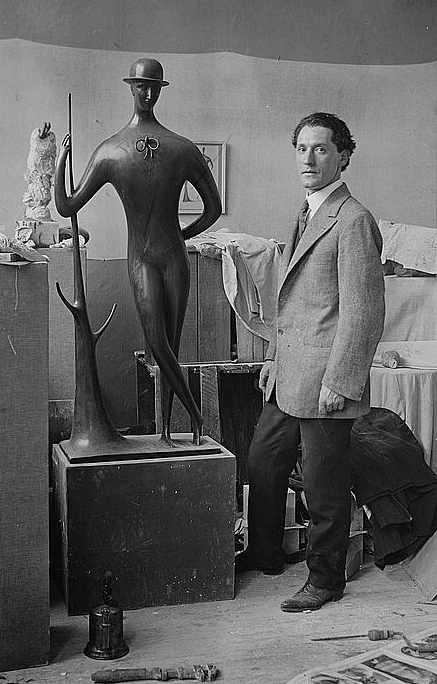
- Born: Eliasz Nadelman; 20 February 1882
- Died: 28 December 1946 (aged 64)
- Known for: Sculpture
- Movement: School of Paris (École de Paris)
- Patrons: Helena Rubinstein

Elie Nadelman (born Eliasz Nadelman; February 20, 1882 – December 28, 1946) was a Polish-American sculptor, draughtsman of the School of Paris and a collector of folk art.

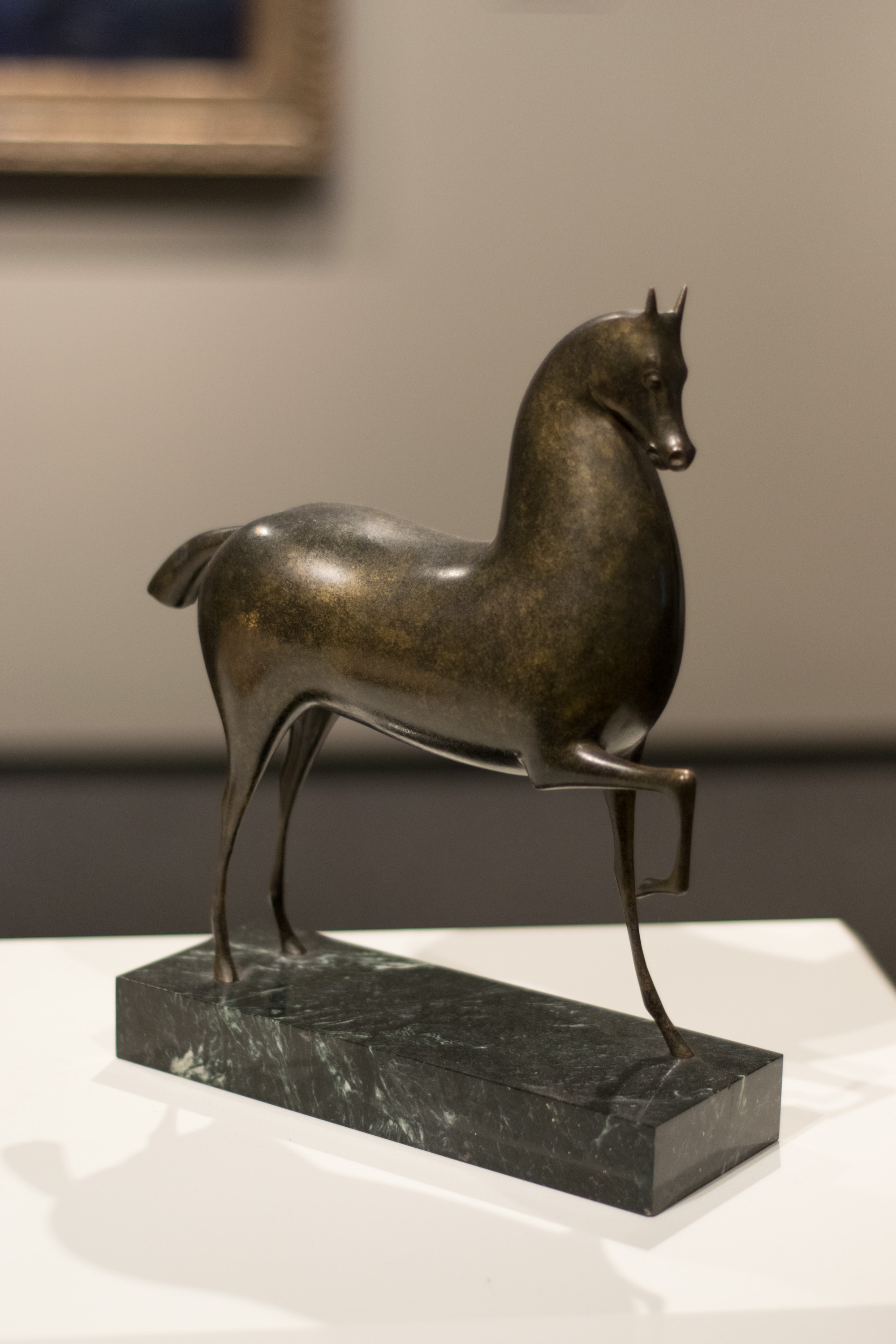
Horse, c. 1914, National Gallery of Art

== Early years ==
Elie Nadelman, Standing Nude, c. 1908, gilded bronze, Metropolitan Museum of Art

Nadelman was born into a Jewish family in Warsaw in 1882. He studied briefly in Warsaw and then visited Munich in 1902 where he became interested in Classical antiquities at the Glyptothek. He lived in Paris from 1904 to 1914, closely involved with the avant-garde, exhibiting at the Société des Artistes Indépendants and at the Salon d'Automne from 1905 to 1908. His first solo exhibition in 1909 at the Galerie Druet, Paris, revealed a large series of plaster and bronze classical female heads and full-length standing nudes and mannered Cubist drawings; the latter purchased by Leo Stein, who had brought Picasso to Nadelman's studio in 1908. Nadelman's work in this early period (1905–1912) was of crucial importance for early 20th-century modern sculpture.

He moved to the United States (becoming an American citizen in 1927) during the outbreak of World War I. He married Mrs. Viola Flannery, a wealthy heiress, in 1920. He and his wife assembled a large collection of folk art and erected a Museum of Folk Arts in Riverdale, N.Y. in 1925. At the same time, his own style was at times Classical, at times decorative, and at times a new kind of sophisticated urban folk art. He attempted to release large, inexpensive editions of his simple, classical, Tanagra-like small figures. All in all, Nadelman collected thousands upon thousands of folk art and added them to his vast collection.

== The Depression ==
From the 1920s, until his death, Nadelman lived and worked in the Riverdale neighborhood of the Bronx.

Eventually, as his wealth vanished in the Depression and his work failed to interest the art world, he became more peripheral to the collectors of Modernism. He did not take commissions other than portraits. In 1937 the collection of the Museum of Folk Arts was sold to the New York Historical Society. He held his last one-man exhibition in 1930 (Paris, Bernheim-Jeune). In 1935 many of his plaster figures and wood-carvings were destroyed by workmen sent to remodel his studio. Nadelman packed away all his pre-1935 work in the attic and cellar of his home in Riverdale and left it there to disintegrate. After his death, in Riverdale, on December 28, 1946, his sculpture "Man in the Open Air", was restored and reintroduced in a retrospective at MOMA, New York. His reputation has grown since his death, and his work is in many major museums and surveys of American art history.

== Works ==
- Circus Women David H. Koch Theater (reproduction)
- Dancer (1918) Wadsworth Atheneum, (Hartford)
- Dancer (c. 1920-1922) Jewish Museum (New York)
- Dancing Girl (1916–1918) Honolulu Museum of Art
- Ideal Head (c. 1910) Honolulu Museum of Art
- Man in the Open Air (c. 1915) Museum of Modern Art, New York City
- Standing Nude (c. 1908) Metropolitan Museum of Art
- Two Nudes David H. Koch Theater (reproduction)
- The Resting Stag (c. 1915) Honolulu Museum of Art
- The Wounded Stag (c. 1915) Honolulu Museum of Art
- Chanteuse (c. 1918) Pennsylvania Academy of the Fine Arts

== Bibliography ==
- Busch, Julia M., A Decade of Sculpture: the New Media in the 1960s (The Art Alliance Press: Philadelphia; Associated University Presses: London, 1974) ISBN 0-87982-007-1
- Haskell, Barbara, Elie Nadelman: Sculptor of Modern Life, Whitney Museum: New York, 2003. ISBN 0-87427-130-4
- Kirstein, Lincoln, Elie Nadelman, Eakins Press, 1973. ISBN 0-87130-035-4
- Spear, Athena Tacha, "Elie Nadelman's Early Heads (1905-1911)," Allen Memorial Art Museum Bulletin, XXVIII, 3, Spring 1971, pp. 201–222.
- Spear, Athena Tacha, "The Multiple Styles of Elie Nadelman: Drawings and Figure Sculptures ca. 1905-12," Allen Memorial Art Museum Bulletin, XXXI, 1, 1973–74, pp. 34–58.
