= Gary Stochl =

Street photographer

Gary Stochl (born 1947) is a street photographer who lives in Stickney, Illinois, just outside Chicago. His work is held in the collections of the Art Institute of Chicago and San Francisco Museum of Modern Art, and published in the book On City Streets: Chicago 1964-2004. Stochl made photographs for 40 years before showing them to anyone.

== Life and work ==
Stochl has been taking photographs since he was 17 years old. In the late 1960s he was inspired by the photographs of Henri Cartier-Bresson. He bought a Leica camera and started taking pictures, his only formal education in photography being a course in high school. Later he was inspired by the work of Robert Frank.

Stochl spent 40 years photographing people on the streets of Chicago without showing them to anyone. In October 2003 he had a solo exhibition at a small Chicago gallery "that went mostly unnoticed." In the Spring of 2004, he went to the Photography Department at Columbia College Chicago and met Bob Thall, the Chair of the Photography Department. Thall was told by his secretary that someone wanted to show him some pictures. He reluctantly agreed and tried to get the meeting over with as soon as possible, but after seeing some of Stochl's photographs he realized that this was a photographer of unusual merit. Thall later helped Stochl to publish his photographs in the book On City Streets: Chicago 1964-2004.

He has used the same camera, a Leica M3, since 1968.

== Publication by Stochl ==
- On City Streets: Chicago 1964-2004. Center Books on Chicago and Environs, vol. 6. Chicago: University of Chicago, 2005. ISBN 978-1930066373. With an introduction by Bob Thall.

== Collections ==
Stochl's work is held in the following permanent public collections:

- Art Institute of Chicago, Chicago, IL
- San Francisco Museum of Modern Art, San Francisco, CA
