= Boris Savelev =

Russian photographer

Boris Savelev (Russian: Борис Александрович Савельев, born 1948) is a Ukrainian-born Russian photographer.

== Career ==
His original career was as an aerospace engineer, however it is photography that made his name since 1976. His works have been shown in galleries in his home country as well as United States, Germany and the UK. In the 1980s, Savelev experimented on color photographies. His first published work was The Secret City (1988), color photographs taken using Orwachrome film. The photographs capture Russia during a period of great upheaval, from the Cold War, through the dissolution of the U.S.S.R., to modern-day Russia.

His style has been described as observational realism preoccupied with light and form. Savelev himself credits his 'methodical, scientific background' for the constructivist aesthetic in his photos.

== Exhibitions (recent) ==
- 2014 - Boris Savelav, Michael Hoppen Gallery, London

== Collections ==
- Museum of Contemporary Photography, Columbia College Chicago, Chicago, Illinois
- Art Institute of Chicago, Chicago, Illinois

== Publications ==
- Secret City, Photographs from the USSR, Boris Savelev. London: Thames & Hudson, 1988.
- Über die großen Städte (Catalog). Berlin: NGBK, 1993.
- Another Russia, Daniela Mrazkova and Vladimir Remes. New York: Facts on File, 1986.
- Changing Reality. Leah Bendavid-Val, Washington, D.C.: Starwood Publishing, 1991.
- Elena Darikovich and Boris Savelev: Photography. State Museum Art Gallery, Kaliningrad, 1994.
- Say Cheese. (Catalog), Le Comptoir de la Photographie," Paris, 1988.
