= Jed Perl =

American art critic

- Born: 1951 (age 74–75)
- Education: Columbia University
- Occupation: Art critic
- Employer: New School for Social Research
- Father: Martin Lewis Perl

Jed Perl (born 1951) is an American art critic and author in New York City. He was a longtime staff writer for The New Republic.

== Career ==
Jed Perl initially trained as a painter. He holds a Bachelor of Arts from Columbia College and also studied at the Skowhegan School of Painting and Sculpture. He decided to devote himself fully to criticism in the mid-1980s. "In my twenties I was very involved in making art as well as writing about art," he said an interview, "but in the early 80s I came to what I guess I would describe as a fork in the road, and around 1985 I just decided to stop painting. A lot of people were not that surprised, they felt that’s where I was going."

Perl became one of the art critics at The New Criterion soon after its founding in 1982. From there he went on to editorial appointments at Art and Antiques, Salamagundi, Vogue, and Modern Painters before joining The New Republic in 1994. His essays have appeared there regularly since then.

Perl is the former Chairman of the Board of the Heliker-LaHotan Foundation, which is dedicated to the preservation and study of the art of John Heliker and Robert LaHotan and the maintenance of their former home on Great Cranberry Island, Maine as an artist residency. He was a friend of Heliker's and wrote the foreword for the catalogue of the exhibition "John Heliker: Drawing on the New Deal, 1932-1948" which originated at Stephen F. Austin State University in 2011.

Perl teaches at the New School for Social Research. His two-volume biography of Alexander Calder was published in 2017 and 2020.

== "Laissez-faire aesthetics" ==
Perl is a longtime critic of what he sees as financially driven compromise of artistic standards among artists, collectors, galleries, and museums. He coined the phrase laissez-faire aesthetics to describe this phenomenon in a 2007 essay for The New Republic that became the introduction for his 2012 book Magicians and Charlatans.

Amid the gold-rush atmosphere of recent months, however, something very strange has emerged, something more pertinent to art than to money - a new attitude, now pervasive in the upper echelons of the art world, about the meaning and experience and value of art itself. A great shift has occurred. This has deep and complex origins; but when you come right down to it, the attitude is almost astonishingly easy to grasp. We have entered the age of laissez-faire aesthetics. The people who are buying and selling the most highly priced contemporary art right now - think of them as the laissez-faire aesthetes - believe that any experience that anyone can have with a work of art is equal to any other. They imagine that the most desirable work of art is the one that inspires a range of absolutely divergent meanings and impressions almost simultaneously. ... My problem, I now realize, is not only that I am looking for consistency, it is that I persist in imagining that there is such a thing as inconsistency. The paintings by Currin and Yuskavage that are now going for hundreds of thousands of dollars are engineered for an audience that believes that a work of art can satisfy radically disparate and even contradictory attitudes and appetites, and satisfy them consecutively or concurrently - it hardly matters. A painting is simply what everybody or anybody says it is, what everybody or anybody wishes it to be.

Edward M. Gomez, reviewing Magicians and Charlatans for Hyperallergic in 2014, wrote, "even if Perl had published only this new book’s introduction ('Laissez-faire Aesthetics') as a pamphlet, it still could have served as something of a manifesto calling for a drastic reconsideration of the art world’s current methods and mores. It’s something of a cri de coeur from a well-informed observer who is deeply disappointed that dollar-value concerns have trumped aesthetic considerations of so much of what comes up for consumption in galleries and venerable museums."

== Personal life ==
Perl is married to the painter Deborah Rosenthal. His father was Martin Lewis Perl, who won the Nobel Prize in Physics in 1995 for his discovery of the tau lepton.

== Bibliography ==
=== Books ===
- Perl, Jed (2026). We Never Called It Frisco. Minneapolis: Coffee House Press. ISBN 9781566897648.
- Perl, Jed (2022). Authority and Freedom. New York: Knopf Publishing Group. ISBN 9780593320051.
- Perl, Jed (2020). Calder: The Conquest of Space. New York: Penguin Random House. ISBN 9780451494115.
- — (2017). Calder: The Conquest of Time. New York: Penguin Random House. ISBN 9780307272720.
- — (2012). Magicians and Charlatans: Essays on Art and Culture. New York: Eakins Press Foundation. ISBN 978-0871300690.
- — (2008). Antoine's Alphabet: Watteau and His World. New York: Alfred A. Knopf. ISBN 978-0307385949.
- — (2005). New Art City: Manhattan at Mid-Century. New York: Alfred A. Knopf. ISBN 978-1400041312.
- — (2000). Eyewitness: Reports from an Art World in Crisis. New York: Basic Books. ISBN 978-0465055203.
- — (1991). Gallery Going: Four Seasons in the Art World. San Diego, CA: Harcourt, Brace, Jovanovich. ISBN 978-0151342600.
- — (1988). Paris Without End: On French Art Since World War I. New York: North Point Press. ISBN 978-0865473133.

=== Essays and reporting ===
- Perl, Jed (4 March 2014). "The Newest Protest Art is the Destruction of the Old Protest Art". The New Republic.
- — (29 November 2013). "Don't Bowdlerize Balthus's Paintings—Or His Mystical Ideas: An artist's restless mastery". The New Republic.
- — (8 August 2013). "Why the Impressionists Still Matter". The New Republic.
- — (3 October 2012). "Michelangelo's Most Haunting Drawing Comes to New York". The New Republic.
- — (4 May 2012). "The Middle Distance". The New Republic.
- — (15 February 2012). "The Pernicious Talk of Decline In the Arts". The New Republic.

=== Book reviews ===
Year	Review article	Work(s) reviewed
2019	Perl, Jed (March 7–20, 2019). "A master of mute forms". The New York Review of Books. 66 (4): 11–13.	Mair, Roswitha. Sophie Taeuber-Arp and the avant-garde : a biography. Translated from the German by Damion Searls. Chicago: U Chicago Press.

== Awards ==
- 2010: John Simon Guggenheim Memorial Foundation Fellowship
- 2010: Leon Levy Center for Biography Fellowship
- 2005: National Magazine Award Finalist in Reviews and Criticism
- 2005: Judith Rothschild Foundation Award
- 2003: Marian and Andrew Heiskell Visiting Critic Award, American Academy in Rome

Perl is also the recipient of a Renate, Hans and Maria Hofmann Trust Award from the New York Foundation for the Arts and awards from the Ingram Merrill Foundation.
