= Takayuki Ogawa =

Japanese photographer

Takayuki Ogawa (小川 隆之, Ogawa Takayuki; 1938 – October 8, 2008) was a Japanese photographer.

Ogawa visited New York City for about a year from 1967 to 1968, where he photographed on the streets. This work was posthumously collected in the book New York Is (2012).

== Publications ==
- New York Is. Tokyo: Akio Nagasawa, 2012. English and Japanese text. Edition of 1000 copies. With an essay by Ogawa (from 1968) and new essays by Nathan Lyons and Anne Wilkes Tucker. Includes a 17-minute DVD of vintage film shot by Ogawa in New York City as well as his still photographs.
