= Bob Thall =

American photographer

Bob Thall is a Chicago photographer specializing in street scenes. He is the former Chair of the Photography Department at Columbia College Chicago, stepping down in 2011. His photographs, of gritty urban street scenes, have been exhibited at the Art Institute of Chicago and the Museum of Modern Art in New York. He won the John Simon Guggenheim Memorial Foundation Fellowship for photography in 1998.

== Books ==
- The Perfect City (Creating the North American Landscape). The Johns Hopkins University Press, 1994. ISBN 0-8018-4726-5.
- The New American Village (Creating the North American Landscape). The Johns Hopkins University Press, 1999. ISBN 0-8018-6158-6.
- City Spaces: Photographs of Chicago Alleys. Center for American Places - Center Books on American Places. Center for American Places, 2002. ISBN 1-930066-07-4.
- On City Streets: Chicago, 1964-2004.Center for American Places - Center Books on American Places. Center for American Places, 2005. ISBN 1-930066-37-6.
- At City's Edge: Photographs of Chicago's Lakefront. Center for American Places - Center Books on American Places. Center for American Places, 2005. ISBN 1-930066-38-4.
