= Yau Leung =

Hong Kong photographer

邱良
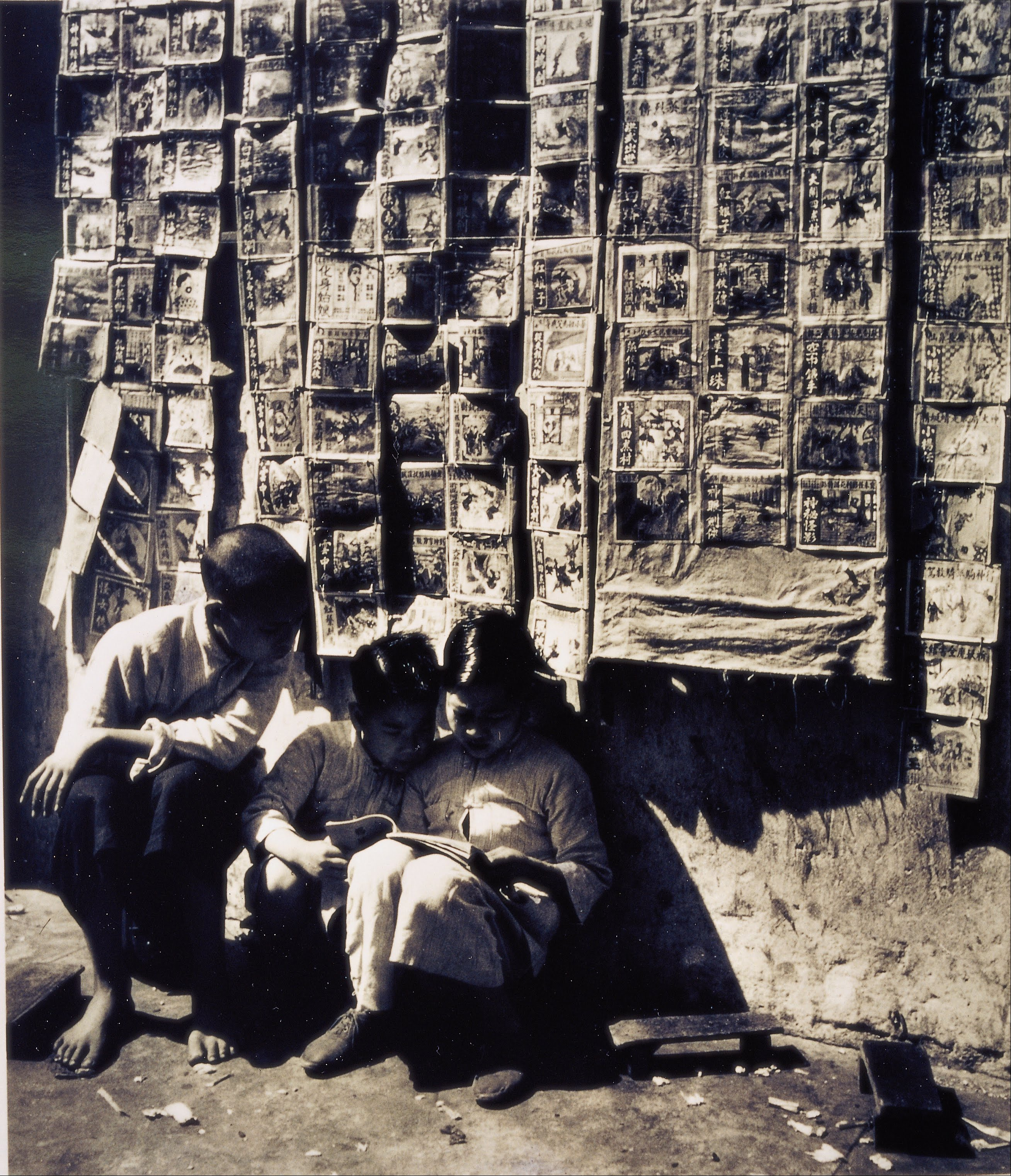
- Comic Stall on Reclamation Street, a photograph by Yau Leung
- Born: 1941
- Died: 1997 (aged 55–56)
- Known for: Photography

Yau Leung (邱良) (1941–1997) was a well regarded photographer in Hong Kong. Professionally a unit still photographer for Shaw Brothers Studio, he is also known for his photographs of Hong Kong street life. He has been called the "Bresson of Hong Kong", referencing the famous pioneer of street photography, Henri Cartier-Bresson (1908–2004).

He founded the monthly magazine Photography Life in 1973. In 1980, he became editor-in-chief of the magazine Photo Art.

Yau died in 1997 from injuries sustained in a fall. A selection of his photographs, edited by Sum Yi Ching, was published posthumously in 1999 under the title Images of Hong Kong 1960s–1970s.
