= Phil Penman =

British photographer

Phil Penman (born 1977) is a British born street photographer living in New York City.

== Early life and education ==
Penman was born in Briantspuddle, Dorset, England. He received his formal training in photography from the Berkshire College of Art and design before working for local newspaper the Wokingham Times.

== Career ==
In 2000 Penman moved to Los Angeles and then to New York City for celebrity news agency Splash News. He photographed celebrities, alongside covering news stories across the world for the Guardian, the Independent, and the Daily Telegraph as well as having features published in Paris Match. He covered the September 11 attacks on the World Trade Center, work from which is included in the National September 11 Memorial & Museum's permanent archive. A woman whom Penman photographed that day hired him to photograph her wedding 17 years later.

He was listed as one of ten "Best Street Photographers of 2019 According to the Phoblographer".

== Publications ==
- Street: Photographs. G, 2021.
- New York Street Diaries. Germany: teNeues, 2023. ISBN 978-3-96171-495-7. In English and German.
- Street Scenes, teNeues, 2025. ISBN 978-3961717248
