= William Whiffin =

William Thomas Whiffin (1878–1957) was a photographer who pioneered what would later be termed street photography in suburban East London in the first half of the twentieth century.

William was born in Poplar. His father, also called William, ran a photography business, which William later took over. However he has come to remembered for his more artistic work.

His daughter, Gladys, contributed an interview to Fly a flag for Poplar (1975) and his photographs were used in the film of the same name produced by Liberation Films in 1974.

There was an exhibition of his work at Tower Hamlets Local History Library and Archives in autumn 2015. His granddaughter, Hellen Martin, spoke about her grandfather's work.

William was living at 11 Woodstock Terrace, Poplar when he was taken ill, dying in Poplar Hospital on 13 November 1957.
