= Craig Semetko =

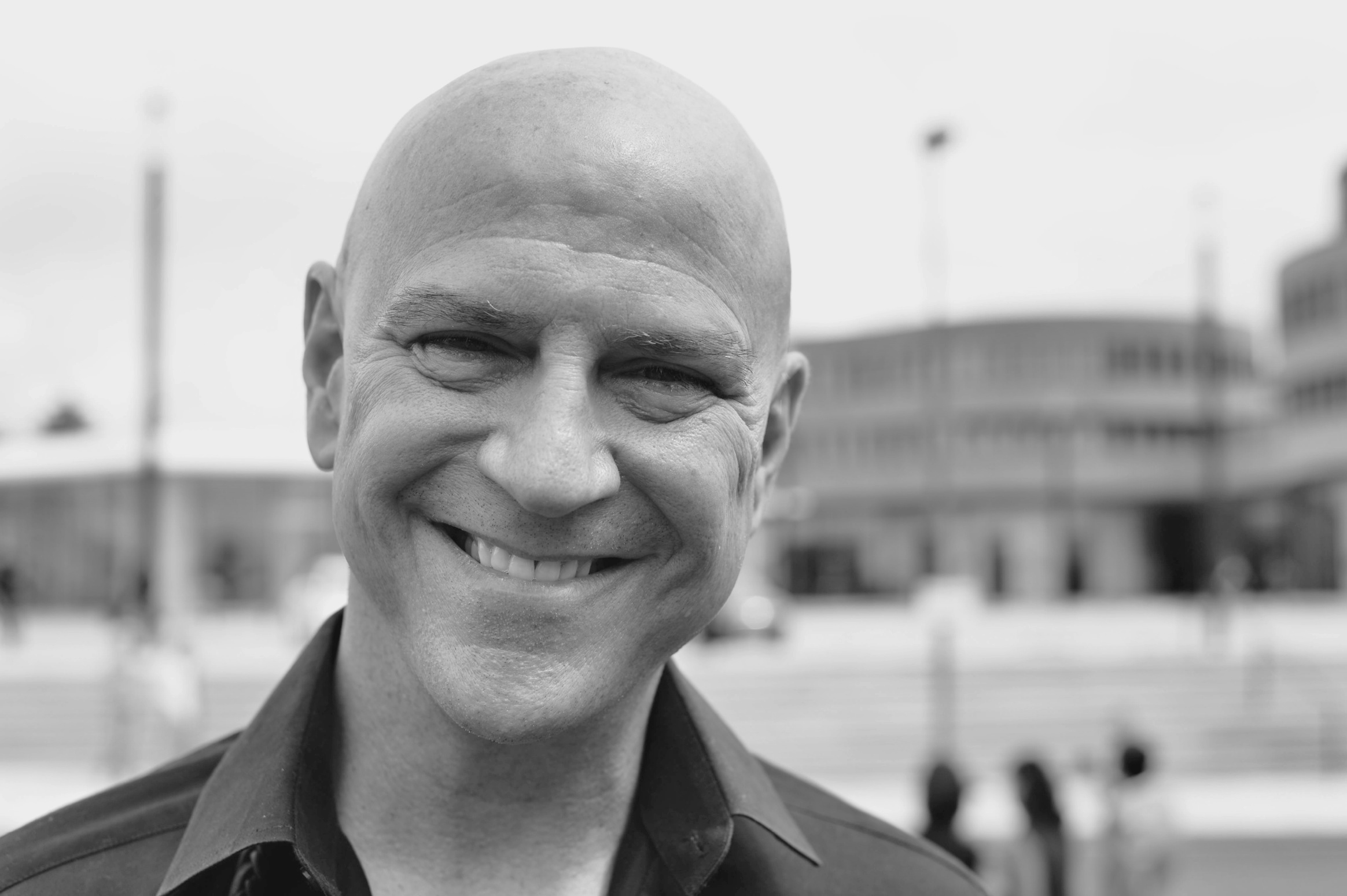
Semetko in 2015

Craig Semetko (born Craig Joseph William Semetko, July 9, 1961) is an American street photographer and speaker based in Los Angeles. He is known for the strong sense of humor and irony that appears in his candid and spontaneous photos of everyday life. He teaches workshops around the world and his photography has been exhibited in the United States, Europe, and Asia.

His series titled Unposed has been published in two books.

== Life and work ==
Semetko was born near Detroit, Michigan and graduated with a Bachelor of Science in Speech from Northwestern University in Evanston, IL. He holds a master's degree in consciousness studies from the University of Philosophical Research in Los Angeles. At 16 he was a page in the United States House of Representatives. For much of his adult life Semetko was a professional comedic actor and writer, and he still performs occasionally. In 2000, he had a corporate performing job that took him to England, Ireland, Japan and China. He purchased his first camera for the trip and after seeing a photo he took outside Shanghai of two women in a dugout canoe it occurred to him that he could use photography as a different medium to tell stories. He has stated he views his photography as an extension of his acting and writing.

Semetko was inspired by the work of Magnum Photos photographers Henri Cartier-Bresson and Elliott Erwitt, saying, "In a perfect world, I would try to get the emotion from an Erwitt image and the composition of a Cartier-Bresson photograph."

=== Unposed ===
Semetko's first book, Unposed, was published by teNeues in 2010 and contained photographs taken from 2000 to 2010. Elliott Erwitt wrote the foreword for the book, excerpted below:

Good photographs are tough enough to shoot. Really funny ones are even harder. Good and funny photographs observed in nature not arranged or manipulated but simply observed in real time with amazing consistency, constitute a minor miracle now presented in Mr. Semetko's book...In my book he is the essential photographer. That is, the one who sees what others could not have seen.

In 2014 Semetko was selected as one of ten photographers to be a part of Leica's 10×10 exhibition. This inaugural show celebrated Leica's 100 year anniversary at their new headquarters and museum in Wetzlar, Germany. Leica paired each photographer with their "artistic father," coupling Semetko with Erwitt. In an article that year celebrating the history of Leica cameras, Esquire magazine called Semetko "a noble torchbearer" to the long legacy of professional photographers using Leicas, beginning with Cartier-Bresson.

== Books ==
=== Books by Semetko ===
- Unposed (teNeues, 2009) ISBN 978-3-8327-9420-0. With a foreword by Elliott Erwitt.
- India Unposed (Street View, 2014) ISBN 978-0-9916065-0-4

=== Books with contributions by Semetko ===
- 10 x 10: Dominic Nahr, Julia Baier, Evgenia Arbugaeva, Craig Semetko, Kirill Golovchenko, Amedeo M. Turello, Alec Soth, Jing Huang, Thomas Ruff, Saga Sig. Volume 1 of Leica Fotografie International. LFI Photographie, 2014. OCLC 935624158.
- Both Sides of Sunset—Photographing Los Angeles (Metropolis, 2015) ISBN 9781938922732
- Inspiration Leica Akademie (English and German Edition), Rheinwerk Publishing; First edition (April 6, 2020). ISBN 3836269732

== Exhibitions ==
=== Solo exhibitions ===
- Street Photography: From Classic to Contemporary—Henri Cartier-Bresson and Craig Semetko (Open Shutter Gallery, Durango, Colorado, 2008)
- Craig Semetko: Street Photography (Leica Gallery, Frankfurt, 2009)
- Craig Semetko: Street Life (Leica Gallery, Salzburg, 2010)
- Craig Semetko: Unposed (Leica Gallery, New York City, 2011)
- Semetko: Unposed (Leica Store, Washington, D.C., 2012). A selection from Unposed as well as E Pluribus Unum.
- AMFM Festival (Cathedral City, CA, 2013)
- America: E Pluribus Unum (Out of Many, One) (Open Shutter Gallery, Durango, Colorado, 2013)
- Craig Semetko—Unposed and Unseen (Leica Gallery Los Angeles, 2014)
- India Unposed (with Torsten Andreas Hoffmann, India on the move; Leica Gallery, Frankfurt, 2014)
- Unposed: India and elsewhere (Leica Gallery Singapore, 2015)
- India Unposed (Vadehra Art Gallery, New Delhi, India, 2015)
- Funny Business (Leica GalleryNuremberg, 2017–2018)
- Craig Semetko: Funny Business (Street Photo Milano, 2018)
- Craig Semetko - For your Amusement (Leica Gallery Melbourne, 2019)
- Craig Semetko - For your Amusement (Leica Gallery Sydney, 2019)

=== Group exhibitions ===
- 10×10 (Leica Gallery Wetzlar, 2014; with Dominic Nahr, Julia Baier, Evgenia Arbugaeva, Kirill Golovchenko, Amadeo M. Turello, Alec Soth, Jing Huang, Thomas Ruff, and Saga Sig)

== Videos ==
- Craig Semetko: Portrait (uberartists, 2010)
- How to use a Leica M Rangefinder: Craig Semetko (Leica Camera, 2014)
- Craig Semetko: The Photographer’s Diet (Cooperative of Photography, 2017)
