= Elena Darikovich =

Russian photographer

Elena Darikovich (1951–2017) was a Russian photographer. She was born and lived in Moscow. After accepting a job in the photo lab of the Museum of the Revolution in Moscow, she began taking her own photographs around Moscow.[4] She met and moved in with fellow photographer Boris Savelev, who encouraged and influenced her work. Boris also became the subject of some of Elena's best work, portraits made dramatic through the use of dark shadows punctuated by shafts of natural light. Elena said of her work, "I make pure photography without symbols. I am interested in man, the environment, light and line."[5]

Her work is included in the collections of the Museum of Fine Arts Houston, the Art Institute of Chicago, and the Museum of Contemporary Photography. It is also represented in two books of Soviet photography from the period of the 1980s, referenced below.
