= Leslie George Katz =

American publisher

Leslie George Katz (c. 1918 – April 18, 1997) was an author and publisher who founded Eakins Press, a specialty publisher of books of art and literature.

== Biography ==
Born in Baltimore, Maryland, Katz attended Black Mountain College in North Carolina, where he met his future wife Jane Mayhall. The two married in the 1940s and moved to New York City. As husband and wife, they were active participants in New York's bohemian community starting in the 1950s, and became friendly with many of the prominent artists at the time.

Over the course of his career, Katz wrote for publications ranging from Classic Comics to The Nation. He wrote speeches for Adlai Stevenson and created plays for a Brooklyn community center. Katz was also a board member of Yaddo, the artists' community located on an estate in Saratoga Springs, New York.

He contributed garden statues to the Brooklyn Museum of Art that were retrieved from sites being demolished and helped arrange the Museum of Modern Art's acquisition of photographs taken by French photographer Eugène Atget.

=== Eakins Press ===
Katz established Eakins Press in 1966, naming it in honor of painter Thomas Eakins.

Katz had obtained the funds to operate the press and his other business ventures by selling a series of paintings by Eakins that his father had purchased secretly and placed in locations scattered around Baltimore. Katz discovered his father's secret in the 1950s, and sold the paintings to art collector Joseph Hirshhorn.

In the three decades before his death, Eakins Press published 56 books that were described by The New York Times as being "notable for their meticulous, elegant design", including works of photography, poetry, sculpture and the New York City Ballet.

The company's first book was a replica of the original 1855 edition of Leaves of Grass, the collection of twelve poems written by Walt Whitman that he had published himself. Another of the early books was Message From the Interior, a collection of photographs by Walker Evans, who was best known for his work for the Farm Security Administration that captured the effects of the Great Depression. Eakins Press also published works by his wife, including the 1966 volume of poems and plays Ready for the Ha Ha & Other Satires and the two-volume collection of poetry Givers and Takers printed in 1968 and 1973.

A January 1993 show at the Zabriskie Gallery in New York City featured selections of 14 works published by the Eakins Press, along with samples of the art produced by the artists highlighted in the books.

=== Death ===
Katz died at age 78 on April 18, 1997, in his home in Manhattan, due to cancer. He was survived by his wife and a brother, the jazz pianist Dick Katz.
