= Eakins Press =

American publishing house

The Eakins Press Foundation is an American publishing house based in New York established by Leslie George Katz in 1966 and named after the painter Thomas Eakins. Since its founding in 1966, the Eakins Press Foundation has published some of the classic volumes on American art and photography, including Lee Friedlander’s The American Monument, Walker Evans’s Message from the Interior, and Lincoln Kirstein’s definitive monograph on Elie Nadelman.

The Eakins Press Foundation was recognized as a 501(c)(3) charitable foundation in 1974.

== Details ==
Katz (1918–97), a former Black Mountain College student, established the press from the proceeds of a sale of his father's collection of Thomas Eakins paintings to Joseph Hirshhorn; to this day they comprise the nucleus of the Eakins Collection at the Hirshhorn Museum and Sculpture Garden in Washington, D.C.

The initial releases were a replica of the original 1855 edition of Leaves of Grass, the collection of twelve poems written by Walt Whitman that he had published himself; and Message From the Interior a collection of photographs by Walker Evans, who was best known for his work for the Farm Security Administration that captured the effects of the Great Depression. Both published in 1966, they represented the beginning of the Eakins Press imprint. For the next three decades, until his death in 1997, Katz published 56 books that were described by The New York Times as being "notable for their meticulous, elegant design", including works of photography, poetry, sculpture and the New York City Ballet. It published Lee Friedlander’s The American Monument, and Lincoln Kirstein’s definitive monograph on Elie Nadelman.

A January 1993 show at the Zabriskie Gallery in New York City featured selections of 14 works published by the Eakins Press Foundation, along with samples of the art produced by the artists highlighted in the books.

Since Katz's death in 1997, the Eakins Press Foundation continues to produce its "invaluable explorations of the American imagination" with publications including Circus: The Photographs of Frederick W. Glasier in 2009; Jed Perl's collection of essays on art and culture, Magicians & Charlatans in 2013; and 'O, Write My Name': American Portraits, Harlem Heroes (2015), a collection of fifty portraits taken by Carl Van Vechten of extraordinary individuals from the Harlem Renaissance. The current Director of the Eakins Press Foundation is Peter Kayafas.
