= W. M. Hunt =

Photography curator

W.M. Hunt
- Born: United States of America
- Occupations: Photography curator, professor, teacher

W.M. Hunt is an American photography collector, curator, and consultant who lives and works in New York City. He was a professor at The School of Visual Arts and has been profiled in The New York Times, Art on Paper, Modern Painters (magazine), The Art Newspaper, PBS’ EGG, the Arts Show, as well as the BBC’s The Genius of Photography.

== Exhibitions ==
- "Delirium" Ricco/Maresca, New York, 1995
- "Sans Regard or No Eyes: Photographs from W.M. Hunt / Collection Dancing Bear" Rencontres de la Photographie, Arles, France, 2005
- "San Regard: La Collection Dancing Bear de W.M. Hunt" Musée de l'Élysée, Lausanne, Switzerland, 2006
- "Eye: The Dancing Bear Collection of W.M. Hunt" Foam Fotografiemuseum Amsterdam, The Netherlands, 2007
- "VII @ Galapagos" New York Photo Festival, New York, 2008
- "RE: groups" Houston Center for Photography, Houston, 2010
- "The Unseen Eye" Appleton Museum of Art, Florida, 2010
- "I Get A Sickening Feeling Every Time I Think Of It - Ten from 2010" VII Gallery, DUMBO, Brooklyn, 2010
- "Photographs from the W.M. Hunt Collection exhibition George Eastman House"
