= Walker Evans =

American photographer and photojournalist (1903–1975)

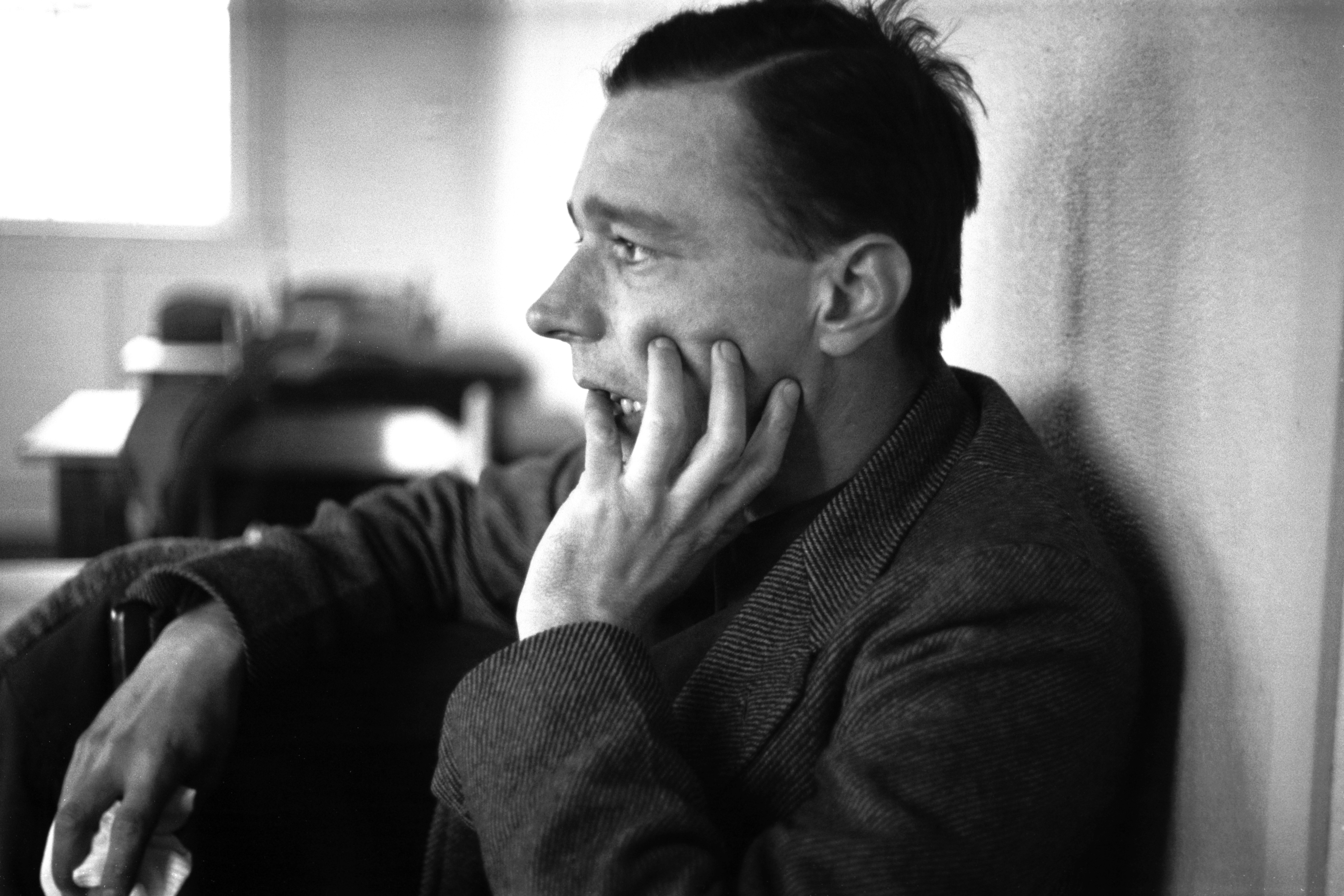
- Evans in 1937
- Born: November 3, 1903; St. Louis, Missouri, U.S.
- Died: April 10, 1975 (aged 71); New Haven, Connecticut, U.S.
- Notable work: American Photographs (1938); Let Us Now Praise Famous Men (1941); Many Are Called (1966)

Walker Evans (November 3, 1903 – April 10, 1975) was an American photographer and photojournalist best known for his work for the Resettlement Administration and the Farm Security Administration (FSA), for whom he documented the effects of the Great Depression. Evans published his first photos at the age of 27. The majority of Evans' New Deal photography made use of the large format, 8 × 10-inch (200×250 mm) view camera. Evans claimed that his goal as a photographer was to make pictures that are "literate, authoritative, transcendent".

Many of Evans' works are in the permanent collections of museums, and his photographs have been the subject of retrospectives at museums such as the Metropolitan Museum of Art and the George Eastman Museum.

== Biography ==
=== Early life ===
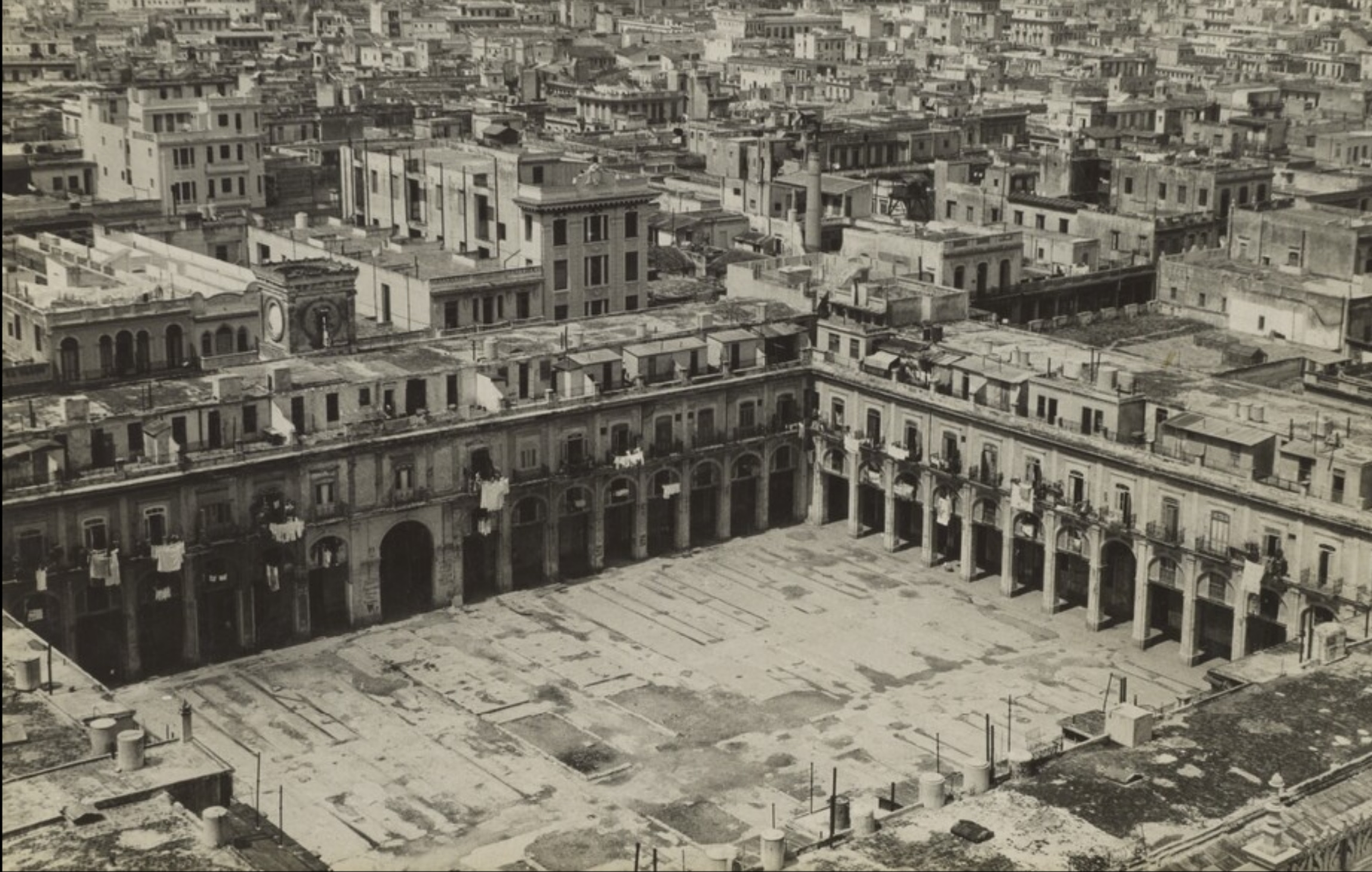
Plaza del Vapor, Havana, photographed by Evans in 1933

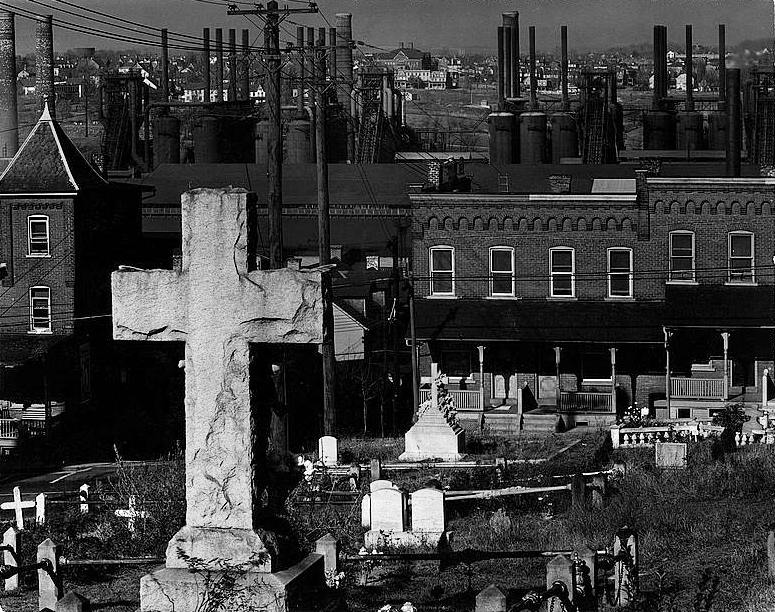
Evans' famous November 1935 photograph, Bethlehem Graveyard and Steel Mill, captures St. Michael's Cemetery in Bethlehem, Pennsylvania, in the foreground and the Bethlehem Steel plant in the background.

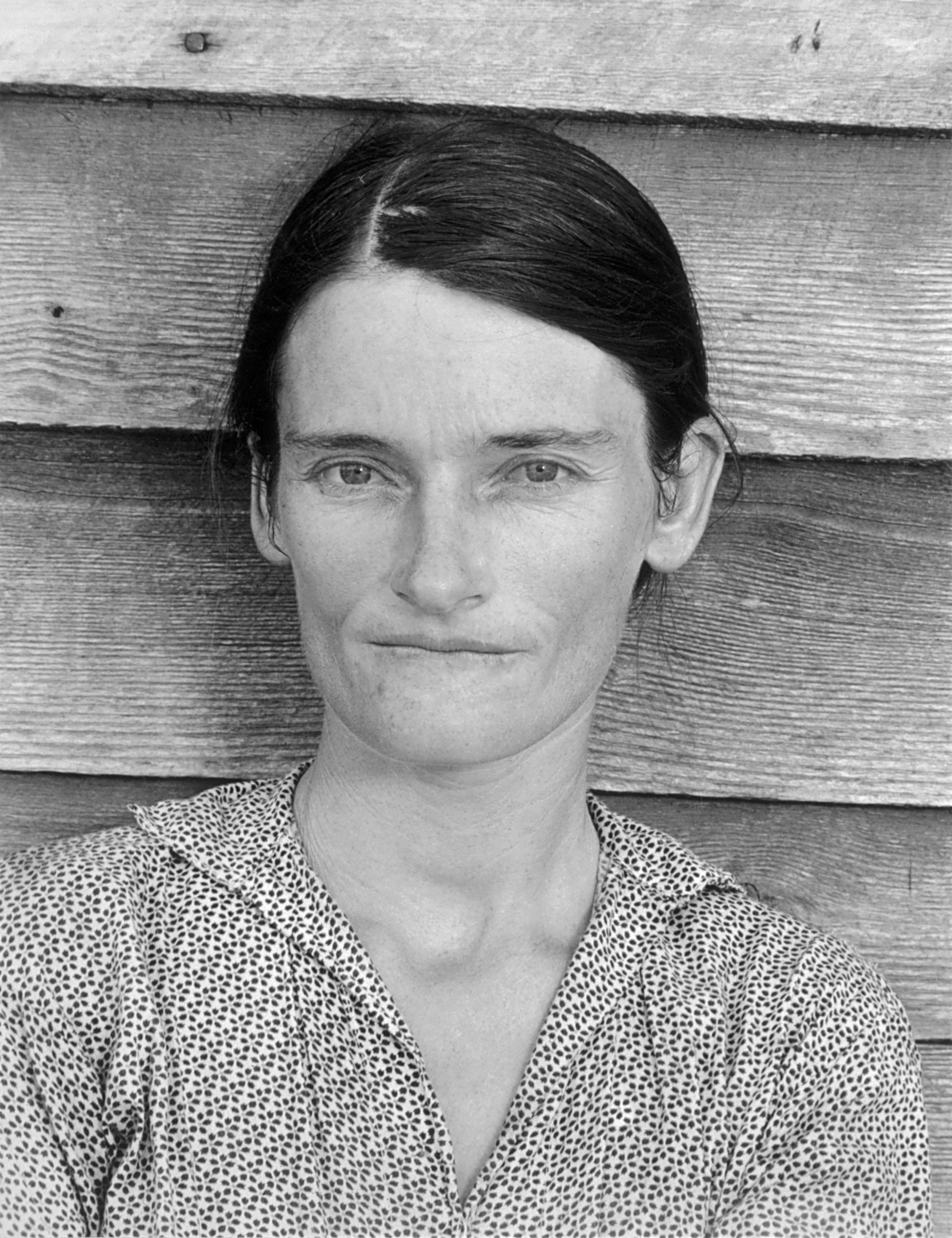
Evans' 1936 photo of then-27-year-old Allie Mae Burroughs, a symbol of the Great Depression

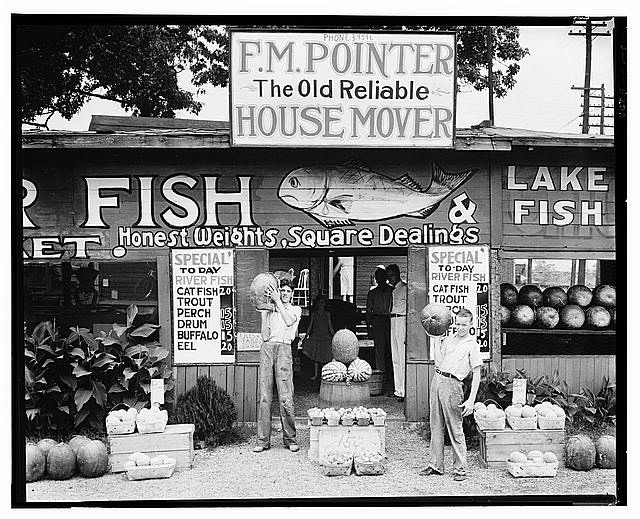
Roadside stand near Birmingham, Alabama, photographed by Evans

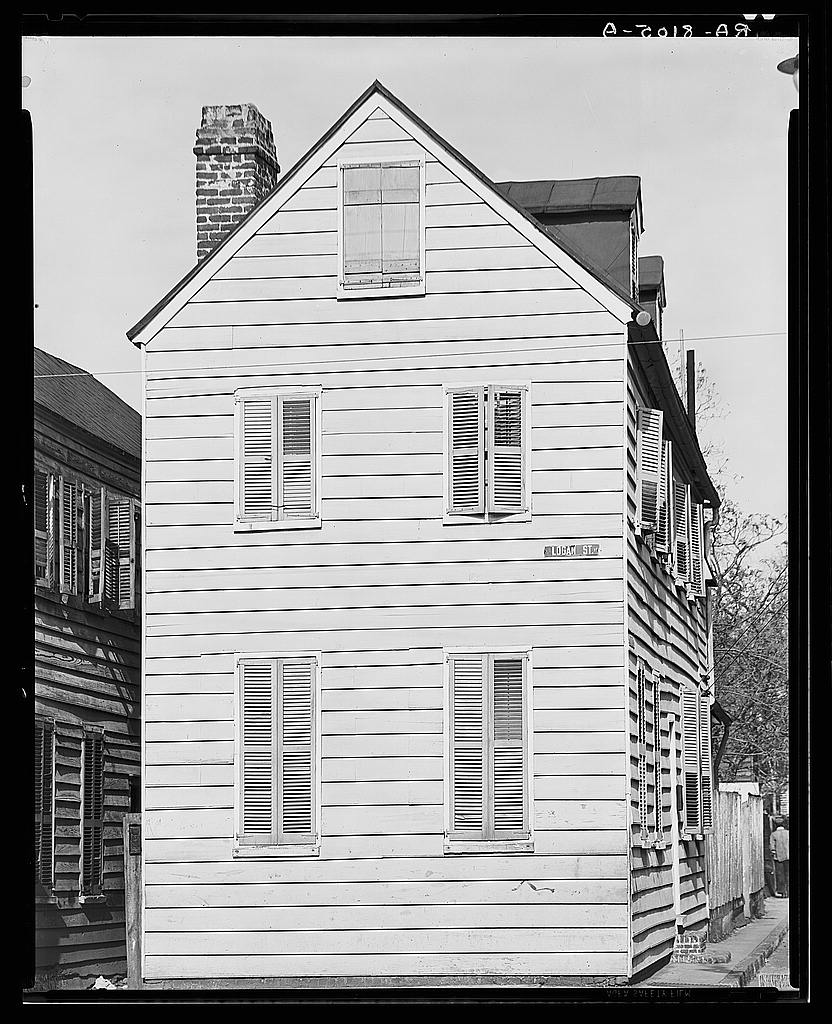
Evans' March 1936 photo, Frame house. Charleston, South Carolina

Walker Evans was born in St. Louis, Missouri, to Jessie (née Crane) and Walker Evans. His father was an advertising director. Walker was raised in an affluent environment; he spent his youth in Toledo, Ohio; Chicago; and New York City. He attended the Loomis Institute and Mercersburg Academy, then graduated from Phillips Academy in Andover, Massachusetts, in 1922. He studied French literature for a year at Williams College, spending much of his time in the school's library before dropping out. He returned to New York City and worked as a night attendant in the map room of the Public Library. After spending a year in Paris in 1926, he returned to the United States to join a literary and art crowd in New York City. John Cheever, Hart Crane, and Lincoln Kirstein were among his friends. He was a clerk for a stockbroker firm on Wall Street from 1927 to 1929.

Evans took up photography in 1928 around the time he was living in Ossining, New York. His influences included Eugène Atget and August Sander. In 1930, he published three photographs (Brooklyn Bridge) in the poetry book The Bridge by Hart Crane. In 1931, he made a photo series of Victorian houses in the Boston vicinity sponsored by Lincoln Kirstein.

In May and June 1933, Evans took photographs in Cuba on assignment for Lippincott, the publisher of Carleton Beals' The Crime of Cuba (1933), a "strident account" of the dictatorship of Gerardo Machado. There, Evans drank nightly with Ernest Hemingway, who lent him money to extend his two-week stay an additional week. His photographs documented street life, the presence of police, beggars and dockworkers in rags, and other waterfront scenes. He also helped Hemingway acquire photos from newspaper archives that documented some of the political violence Hemingway described in To Have and Have Not (1937). Fearing that his photographs might be deemed critical of the government and confiscated by Cuban authorities, he left 46 prints with Hemingway. He had no difficulties when returning to the United States, and 31 of his photos appeared in Beals' book. The cache of prints left with Hemingway was discovered in Havana in 2002 and exhibited at an exhibition in Key West.

=== Depression-era photography ===
The Great Depression years of 1935–36 were a period of remarkable productivity and accomplishment for Evans. In 1935, Evans spent two months on a fixed-term photographic campaign in West Virginia and Pennsylvania. In June 1935, he accepted a job from the U.S. Department of the Interior to photograph a government-built resettlement community of unemployed coal miners in West Virginia. He quickly parlayed this temporary employment into a full-time position as an "information specialist" in the Resettlement Administration (later called the Farm Security Administration), a New Deal agency in the Department of Agriculture. From October 1935 on, he continued to do photographic work for the RA and later the Farm Security Administration (FSA), primarily in the Southern United States. In November 1935, he visited the industrial hub of the Lehigh Valley in eastern Pennsylvania, capturing photos of Bethlehem Steel. His photograph, Bethlehem Graveyard and Steel Mill, which captured Bethlehem's St. Michael's Cemetery in the foreground and Bethlehem Steel's smokestacks in the background ranks among his best known.

In the summer of 1936, while on leave from the FSA, writer James Agee and he were sent by Fortune on assignment to Hale County, Alabama for a story the magazine subsequently opted not to run. In 1941, Evans' photographs and Agee's text detailing the duo's stay with three White tenant families in southern Alabama during the Great Depression were published as the groundbreaking book Let Us Now Praise Famous Men. Its detailed account of three farming families paints a deeply moving portrait of rural poverty. Critic Janet Malcolm notes that a contradiction existed between a kind of anguished dissonance in Agee's prose and the quiet, magisterial beauty of Evans' photographs of sharecroppers.

In 1936, Walker Evans, employed by the National Recovery Administration photographed three impoverished sharecropper families in Hale County, Alabama. The photographs became iconic and were praised for effectively capturing the negative effects of the Great Depression in the American South. The photographs are displayed at the Metropolitan Museum of Art, the Whitney Museum and the National Galleries of Scotland, among other places.

The three families headed by Bud Fields, Floyd Burroughs, and Frank Tingle, lived in the Hale County town of Akron, Alabama, and the owners of the land on which the families worked told them that Evans and Agee were "Soviet agents", although Allie Mae Burroughs, Floyd's wife, recalled during later interviews her discounting that information. Evans' photographs of the families made them icons of Depression-era misery and poverty. In September 2005, Fortune revisited Hale County and the descendants of the three families for its 75th-anniversary issue. Charles Burroughs, who was four years old when Evans and Agee visited the family, was "still angry" at them for not even sending the family a copy of the book; the son of the Burroughs was also reportedly angry because the family was "cast in a light that they couldn't do any better, that they were doomed, ignorant".

Evans continued to work for the FSA until 1938. That year, an exhibition, Walker Evans: American Photographs, was held at the Museum of Modern Art, New York. This was the first exhibition in the museum devoted to the work of a single photographer. The catalogue included an accompanying essay by Lincoln Kirstein, whom Evans befriended in his early days in New York.

In 1938, Evans also took his first photographs in the New York City Subway with a camera hidden in his coat. These were collected in book form in 1966 under the title Many Are Called. These photos figure in the novel "Rules of Civility" by Amor Towles. In 1938 and 1939, Evans worked with and mentored Helen Levitt.

Like such other photographers as Henri Cartier-Bresson, Evans rarely spent time in the darkroom making prints from his own negatives. He loosely supervised the making of prints of most of his photographs, sometimes only attaching handwritten notes to negatives with instructions on some aspect of the printing procedure.

=== Later work ===
Between 1940 and 1959, Walker Evans was awarded three Guggenheim Fellowships in Photography to continue his work of making record photographs of contemporary American subjects.

Evans was a passionate reader and writer, and in 1945 became a staff writer at Time. Shortly afterward, he became an editor at Fortune through 1965. That year, he became a professor of photography on the faculty for graphic design at the Yale University School of Art.

In one of his last photographic projects, Evans completed a black-and-white portfolio of Brown Brothers Harriman & Co.'s offices and partners for publication in "Partners in Banking", published in 1968 to celebrate the private bank's 150th anniversary. In 1973 and 1974, Evans used the new Polaroid SX-70 instant camera for his last work; the company provided him with an unlimited supply of film, and the camera's simplicity and speed were easier for the aged photographer.

The first definitive retrospective of his photographs, which "individually evoke an incontrovertible sense of specific places, and collectively a sense of America", according to a press release, was on view at New York's Museum of Modern Art (MOMA) in early 1971. Selected by John Szarkowski, the exhibit was titled simply Walker Evans.

=== Photographic style ===
Evans's style has been hard to describe. John Szarkowski regarded his work as different, and MOMA considers him "one of the most influential artists of the twentieth century." In a 1964 lecture at Yale University, Evans described his own style as "Lyric Documentary." Others, such as Jane Tormey, have described his later work as having a "vernacular" style, a common aesthetic made popular by Geoffrey Batchen in his seminal article "Vernacular Photographies."

=== Death and legacy ===
External videos
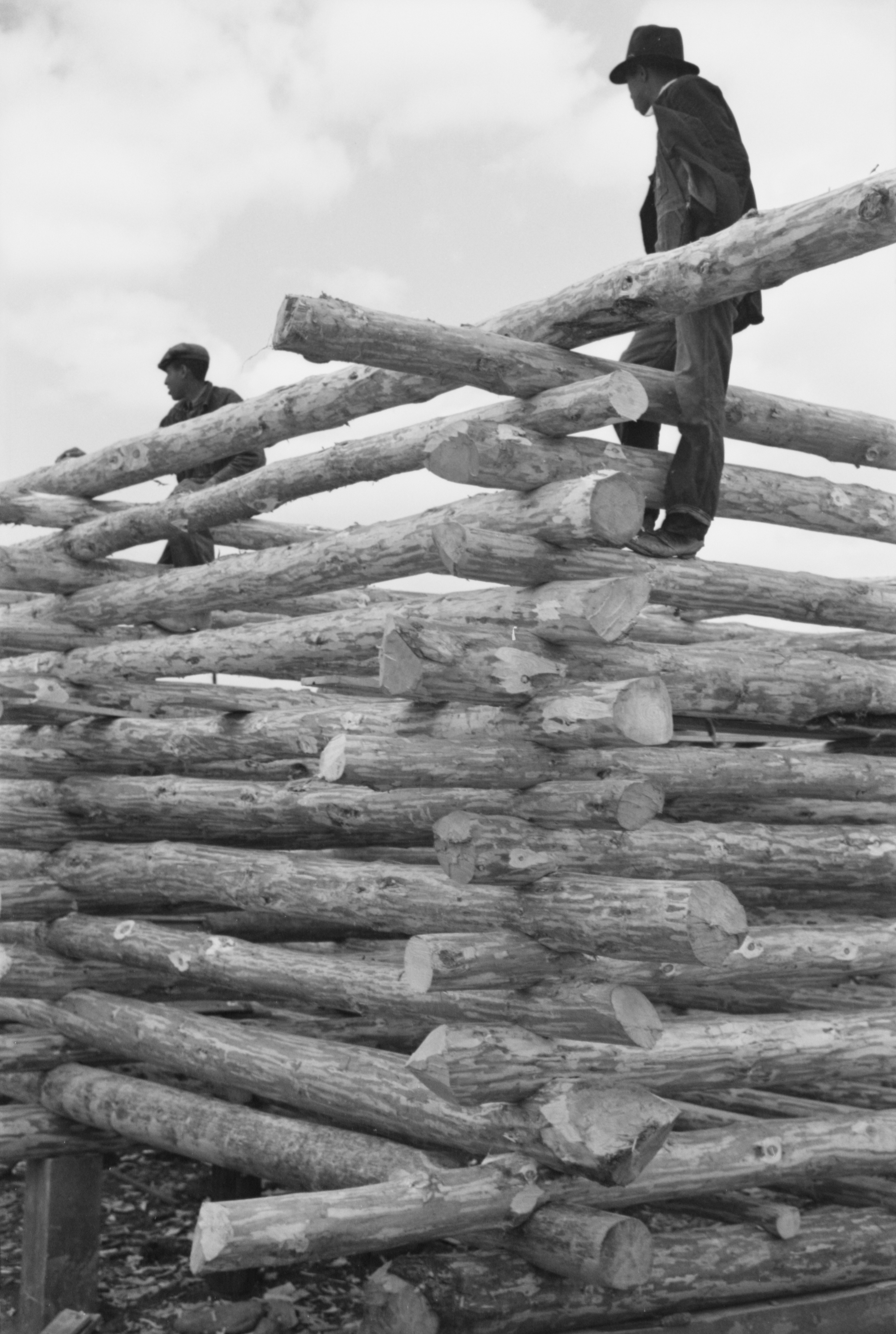
- Walker Evans in His Own Words on YouTube, (4:37), J. Paul Getty Museum

Evans died at his apartment in New Haven, Connecticut in 1975. The last person Evans talked to was Hank O'Neal. In reference to the newly created A Vision Shared project, O'Neal recounts, "The picture on the back of the book, of him taking a picture – he actually called me up and told me he had found it”. “And then the next morning I got up and I had a phone call from Leslie Katz, who ran the Eakins Press. And Leslie said: ‘Isn’t it terrible about Walker Evans?’ And I said: ‘What are you talking about?’ He said: ‘He died last night.’ I said: ‘Cut it out. I talked to him last night twice’ ... So an hour and a half after we had our conversation, he died. He had a stroke and died."

In 1994, the estate of Walker Evans handed over its holdings to New York City's Metropolitan Museum of Art. The Metropolitan Museum of Art is the sole copyright holder for all works of art in all media by Walker Evans. The only exception is a group of about 1,000 negatives in collection of the Library of Congress, which were produced for the Resettlement Administration and Farm Security Administration; these works are in the public domain.

In 2000, the Metropolitan Museum of Art mounted a retrospective of Walker's work. The exhibit included over 175 photographs spanning his career and material from the Walker archive.

In 2000, Evans was inducted into the St. Louis Walk of Fame.

== Collections ==
- Addison Gallery of American Art, Andover, Massachusetts: 142 works (as of June 2021)
- Art Institute of Chicago, Chicago, Illinois
- George Eastman Museum, Rochester, New York
- J. Paul Getty Museum, Los Angeles, California: 1338 works (as of January 2019
- Metropolitan Museum of Art, New York City
- Museum of Modern Art, New York City: 205 works (as of January 2019)
- Whitney Museum of American Art, New York City: 16 works (as of January 2019)
- National Gallery of Victoria, Melbourne, Australia: 36 works (as of April 2019)
- International Photography Hall of Fame, St. Louis, Missouri

== Sources ==
- "Furniture Store Sign, Birmingham, Alabama"
- Walker Evans exhibition in the argus fotokunst art gallery in Berlin.
