= James Jowers =

American photographer

James Jowers (1939–2009) was an American street photographer. Jowers began receiving training in photography and darkroom techniques while serving in the United States Army. While working the night shift as a porter at St. Luke's Hospital, he would spend his free time during the day roaming the streets of his Lower East Side neighborhood and the rest of Manhattan, capturing a gritty, funny, and idiosyncratic view of the city.

Jowers' photographs were included as illustrations for articles in The New York Times and Forbes in the 1970s. In 2007 and 2008, George Eastman Museum acquired the photographs and negatives he made between 1964 and 1980.

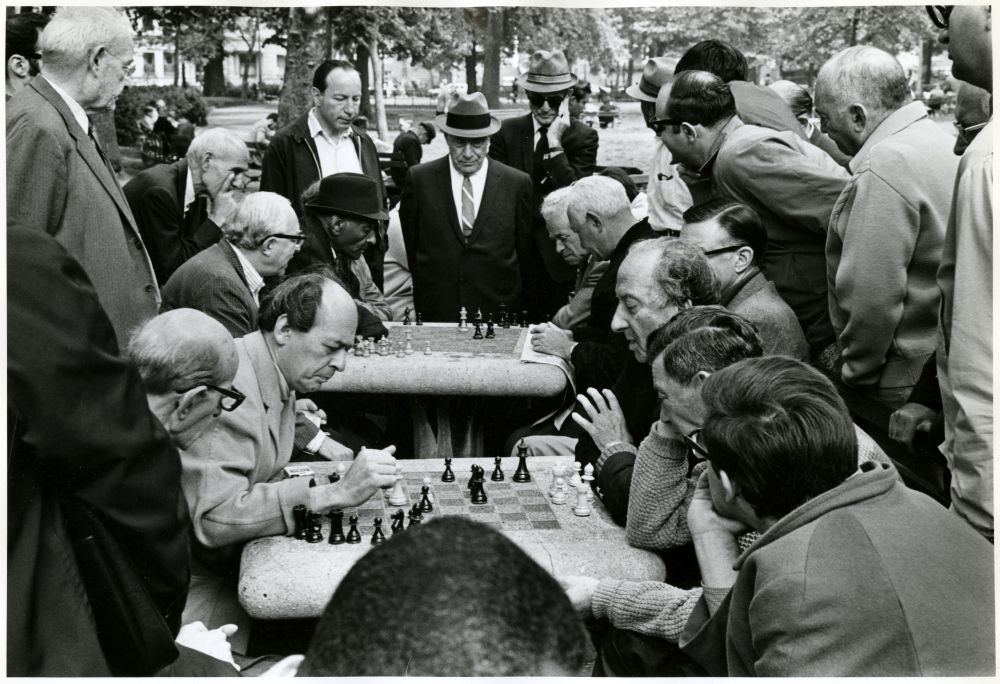
"Washington Sq. P.", 1969, by Jowers

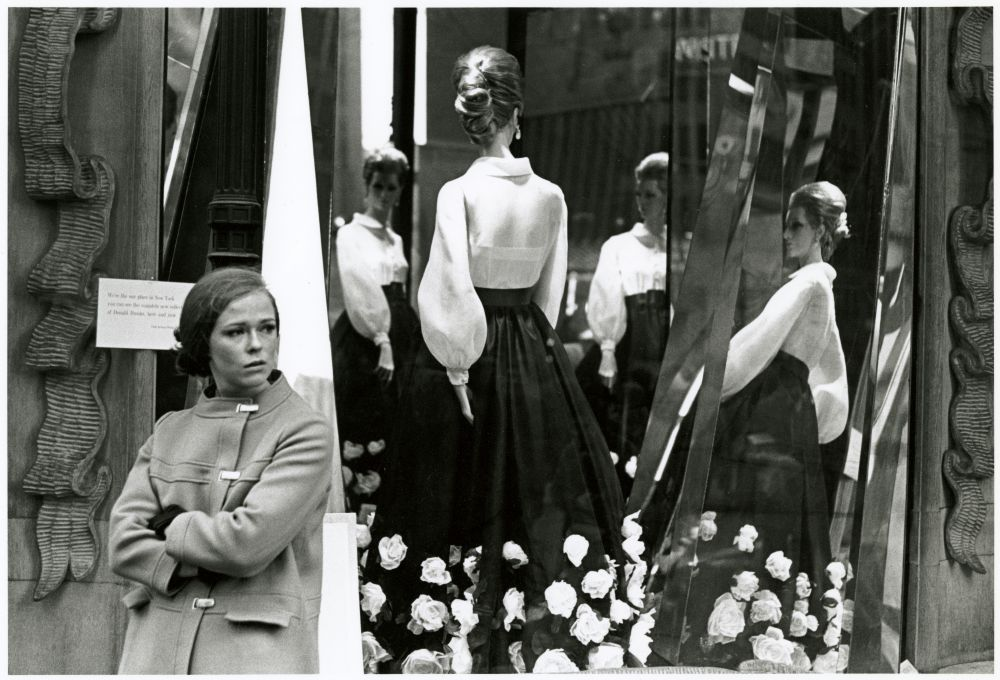
An untitled photograph from 1968 by Jowers

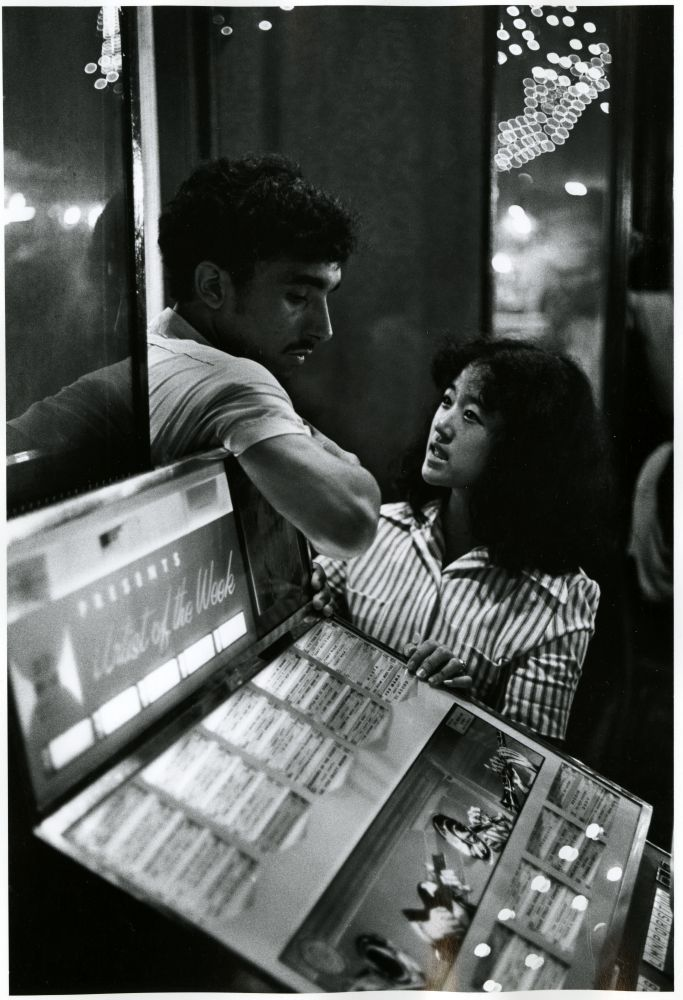
"Mulberry st", 1969, by Jowers

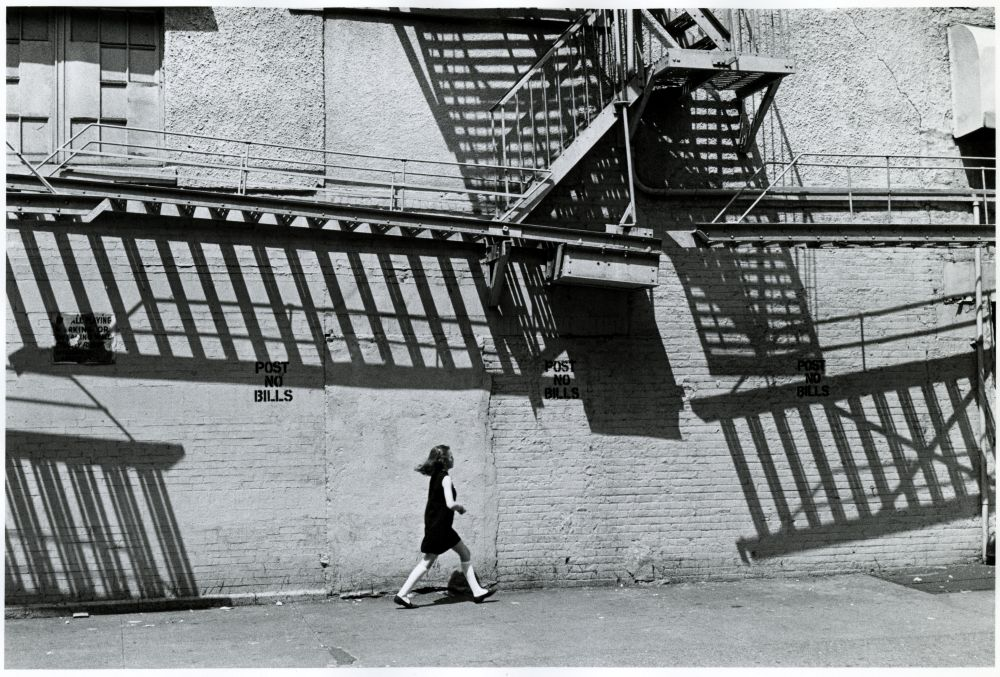
"st. Marks Pl.", 1968, by Jowers

== Publications with contributions by Jowers ==
- Whitten, Whitten and W. Lance Bennett. The Study of Society. Guilford, CT: Dushkin Publishing Group, 1973.
- Wilkins, Ronald J. Man and Woman. Dubuque, Iowa: William C. Brown, 1975.
- Stark, Rodney. Social Problems. New York: Random House, 1975.
- Photography Annual 1975. New York: Ziff Davis, 1974.
- Meyers, Richard and David Giannini, ed. Genesis: Grasp. Vol. 1, No. 1. New York, Genesis: Grasp Press, 1968.
- Lindgren, Henry Clay. An Introduction to Social Psychology. New York: Wiley, 1973.
- Goldenberg, Herbert. Abnormal Psychology: A Social/Community Approach. Monterey, CA: Brooks/Cole Publishing Co, 1977.

== Collection ==
Jowers' work is held in the following permanent public collection:

- George Eastman Museum, Rochester, New York

== Group exhibitions ==
- What We're Collecting Now: The Family Photographed, September 5, 2009 – July 18, 2010, George Eastman Museum, Rochester, New York
- The Gender Show, June 15, 2013 – January 10, 2016, George Eastman Museum, Rochester, New York; then toured. Photographs by Jowers, Robert Frank, Mary Ellen Mark, Julia Margaret Cameron, Edward Steichen, Lejaren à Hiller, Nickolas Muray, Mark Goodman, Vincent Cianni, and Elias Goldensky.
