= Joel Meyerowitz =

American photographer

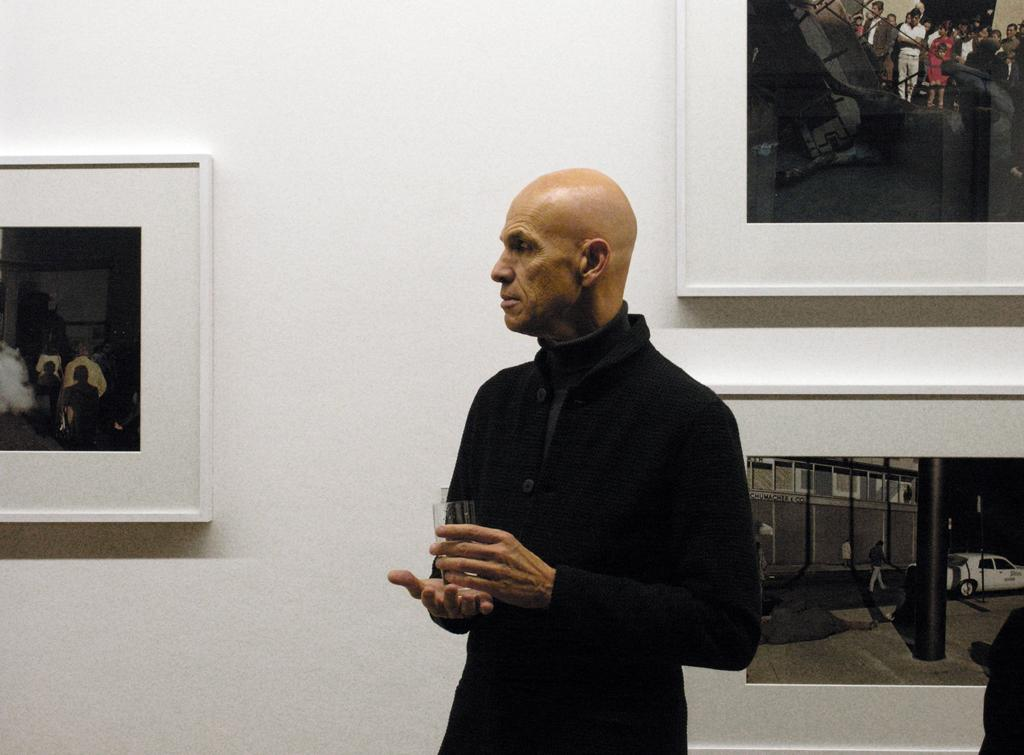
- Meyerowitz in 2004
- Born: March 6, 1938 (age 88); New York, New York, U.S.
- Education: Ohio State University
- Occupation: Photographer
- Style: Street Photography
- Website: www.joelmeyerowitz.com

Joel Meyerowitz (born March 6, 1938) is an American street, portrait and landscape photographer. He began photographing in color in 1962 and was an early advocate of the use of color during a time when there was significant resistance to the idea of color photography as serious art. In the early 1970s he taught photography at the Cooper Union in New York City.

His work is in the collections of the International Center of Photography, Museum of Modern Art, and New York Public Library, all in New York, and the Museum of Contemporary Photography in Chicago.

== Early life and education ==
Meyerowitz was born in the Bronx, to working class Jewish parents who had immigrated to the United States from Hungary and Russia. He and his brother Rick Meyerowitz grew up in Soundview, Bronx.

He studied art, art history, and medical illustration at Ohio State University, graduating in 1959.

== Career ==
In 1962, inspired by seeing Robert Frank at work, Meyerowitz quit his job as an art director at an advertising agency and took to the streets of New York City with a 35 mm camera and color film. As well as Frank, Meyerowitz was inspired by Henri Cartier-Bresson and Eugène Atget—he has said, "In the pantheon of greats there is Robert Frank and there is Atget."

After alternating between black and white and color, Meyerowitz "permanently adopted color" in 1972, well before John Szarkowski's promotion in 1976 of color photography in an exhibition of work by the then little-known William Eggleston. Meyerowitz also switched at this time to large format, often using an 8×10 camera to produce photographs of places and people.

Meyerowitz appears extensively in the 2006 BBC Four documentary series The Genius of Photography and in the 2013 documentary film Finding Vivian Maier. In 2014 the documentary Sense of Time by German filmmaker Ralph Goertz was published.

He is the author of many books including Cape Light, considered a classic work of color photography. Meyerowitz photographed the aftermath of the September 11, 2001, attack on the World Trade Center, and was the only photographer allowed unrestricted access to its Ground Zero immediately following the attack. This resulted in the book Aftermath: World Trade Center Archive (2006), which Parr and Badger include in the third volume of their photobook history.

On January 18, 2017, Meyerowitz was honored for his lifelong work with a place at the Leica Hall of Fame and was described as a "magician using colour" and being able to "both capture and framing the decisive moment".

== Personal life ==
Meyerowitz is married to English artist and novelist Maggie Barrett. In addition to their home in New York City, they maintain a residence outside of Siena, Tuscany, Italy.

== Publications ==
=== Photo books and monographs ===
- Cape Light: Color Photographs by Joel Meyerowitz. With a transcript of an interview between Meyerowitz and Bruce K. MacDonald. Boston: Museum of Fine Arts, Boston, 1979. ISBN 0-87846-132-9.
  - Remastered edition: New York: Aperture, 2015. ISBN 978-1-59711-339-7.
- St. Louis and the Arch. New York: New York Graphic Society, 1980. ISBN 0-82121-093-9.
- Wild Flowers. Boston: Bulfinch, 1983. ISBN 0-82121-528-0.
  - Revised edition. Damiani, 2021. ISBN 978-88-6208-730-8.
- A Summer's Day. New York: Crown, 1985. ISBN 0-81291-182-2.
- Creating a Sense of Place. Washington, DC: Smithsonian Institution Press, 1990. ISBN 1-56098-004-4.
- Redheads. New York, NY: Rizzoli, 1991. ISBN 0-84781-419-X.
- Bay/Sky. Boston: Bulfinch, 1993. ISBN 0-82122-037-3.
- At the Water's Edge. Boston: Bulfinch, 1996. ISBN 0-82122-310-0.
- Joel Meyerowitz. Text by Colin Westerbeck. 55. London: Phaidon, 2001. ISBN 0-7148-4021-1.
- Tuscany: Inside the Light. New York: Barnes & Noble, 2003. ISBN 1-40274-321-1.
- Aftermath. London: Phaidon, 2006. ISBN 0-71484-655-4.
  - Aftermath: World Trade Center Archive. London: Phaidon, 2011. ISBN 0-71486-212-6.
- Out of the Ordinary 1970-1980. Rotterdam: Episode, 2007. ISBN 90-5973-067-4.
- Legacy: The Preservation of Wilderness in New York City Parks. New York: Aperture, 2009. ISBN 1-59711-122-8.
- Between the Dog and the Wolf. Kamakura, Japan: Super Labo, 2013. ISBN 978-4-905052-61-6. Edition of 500 copies.
- Joel Meyerowitz - Retrospective. Cologne / New York: Koenig Books / D.A.P., 2014. ISBN 978-3-86335-588-3.
- Glimpse. Tokyo: Super Labo, 2014. ISBN 978-4-905052-73-9. Edition of 1000 copies.
- Out of the Darkness: Six Months in Andalusia 1966~1967. Madrid: La Fábrica, 2018. ISBN 978-84-17048-43-3.
- Where I Find Myself: A Lifetime Retrospective. London: Laurence King, 2018. ISBN 978-1-78627-186-0. With a text by Colin Westerbeck.
- Morandi's Objects. The Complete Archive of Casa Morandi 2016 ISBN 978-8862084536

=== Further publications ===
- Bystander: A History of Street Photography. With Colin Westerbeck. Boston: Bulfinch, 1994. ISBN 0-82121-755-0.
  - UK edition: London: Thames & Hudson 1994. ISBN 0-500-54190-6 (2nd ed.: Norton Co 1999).
  - Paperback edition with a new afterword on street photography since the 1970s: Boston: Bulfinch/Little Brown, 2001. ISBN 0-8212-2726-2.
  - New revised and expanded edition: London: Laurence King, 2017. ISBN 978-1-78627-066-5.
- Paul Strand: The Gardens of Orgeval. Selection and text by Meyerowitz. New York: Aperture 2012. ISBN 978-1-59711-124-9.
- Pictures from Moving Cars. Photographs by Meyerowitz, Daido Moriyama und John Divola, Abad, 2013.
- Colin Westerbeck: Vivian Maier: The Color Work. Foreword by Joel Meyerowitz. New York: Harper Collins 2014. ISBN 978-0-06-279557-1.
- Seeing Things. A Kid's Guide to Looking at Photographs. New York: Aperture 2016. ISBN 978-1-59711-315-1.
- Joel Meyerowitz: How I Make Photographs. Masters of Photography. London: Laurence King 2020. ISBN 978-1-78627-580-6.
- The Pleasure of Seeing. Conversations with Joel Meyerowitz on Sixty Years in the Life of Photography. Bologna: Damiani 2023. ISBN 978-88-6208-793-3.
- Joel Meyerowitz: A Question of Color. New York: Thames & Hudson, 2024. ISBN 978-0-50029-789-6.

== Literature ==
- Sally Eauclaire: American Independents: Eighteen Color Photographers. New York: Abbeville, 1987. ISBN 0-89659-666-4.
- Sophie Howarth and Stephen McLaren (eds.): Street Photography Now. London: Thames & Hudson, 2010. ISBN 978-0-500-54393-1.

== Awards ==
- Guggenheim Fellow (twice)
- National Endowment for the Arts award
- National Endowment for the Humanities award
- Deutscher Fotobuchpreis (the German photobook prize) for Aftermath
- The Royal Photographic Society's Centenary Medal and Honorary Fellowship (HonFRPS) in recognition of a sustained, significant contribution to the art of photography in 2012.

== Exhibitions ==
- 1968: My European Trip: Photographs from the Car by Joel Meyerowitz, MOMA, August 3–September 29, 1968
- 2006: Joel Meyerowitz: Modern Color, Vintage Prints, Edwynn Houk Gallery, April 27 — June 17, 2006
- 2012: Joel Meyerowitz - 50 Years of Photographs Part I: 1962 - 1977, November–December 2012; and Joel Meyerowitz - 50 Years of Photographs Part II: 1976 - 2012, December 2012 – January 2013, Howard Greenberg Gallery, New York.
- 2014: Joel Meyerowitz Retrospektive, NRW-Forum Düsseldorf, (curated by Ralph Goertz),
  - 2015: KunstHausWien (curated by Verena Kaspar-Eisert)
- 2017: Joel Meyerowitz - Transition, Howard Greenberg Gallery, September 7 - October 21, 2017

== Collections ==
- Art Institute of Chicago, Chicago, IL
- International Center of Photography, New York
- Museum of Contemporary Photography, Chicago
- Museum of Modern Art, New York – Photography Collection
- New York Public Library, New York – Photography Collection
- Amon Carter Museum, Fort Worth, Texas - Photography Collection
- Pérez Art Museum Miami, Florida
