= Laurence King Publishing =

British publishing company

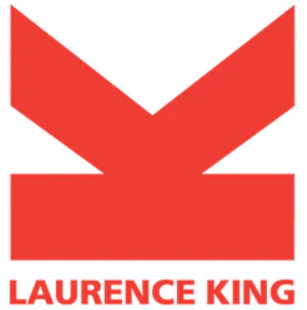
- Laurence King Publishing logo
- Parent company: Hachette UK
- Founded: 1991
- Founder: Laurence King
- Country of origin: United Kingdom
- Headquarters location: London
- Publication types: Books
- Official website: Laurence King Publishing

Laurence King Publishing or LKP is a publishing house based in London, with offices in Europe and the United States.

== History ==
Laurence King Publishing was founded by and named after Laurence King in 1991 in London. It teams up with illustrators, designers, artists and photographers to produce unique books and gifts.

In 2017 Laurence King Verlag was founded in Berlin to be the German-language subsidiary of Laurence King Publishing and acquired BIS Publishers based in Amsterdam. It publishes a select number of German-language books, children' s books, and gifts, and distributes LKP's English list in Germany, Austria, and Switzerland.

Laurence King Publishing is a longstanding participant in The Book Chain Project, an initiative set up to help publishers make informed buying decisions at every stage of their book supply chain.

In September 2020 Laurence King was acquired by Hachette UK for an undisclosed amount, and LKP's gift, trade and art publishing became an imprint of Orion Publishing Group. LKP's student and professional publishing became an imprint of Quercus and LKP's children's publishing became part of Hachette Children's Group.

== Publications ==
Laurence King Publishing has published a number of popular titles, including a monograph on the American designer Saul Bass; a book by illustrator Marion Deuchars, Let's Make Some Great Art; the art history text A World History of Art by Hugh Honour and John Fleming; and a series of adult coloring books by Scottish illustrator Johanna Basford.

LKP has also been publishing playing cards, games, and jigsaw puzzles themed after animals and myths. Among the publisher's bestselling products are 1,000-piece jigsaw puzzles inspired by the lives and works of famous people such as Maya Angelou, Jane Austen, the Brontë sisters, Agatha Christie, Charles Dickens, Arthur Conan Doyle, F. Scott Fitzgerald, Ian Fleming, the Brothers Grimm, Frida Kahlo, Julia Quinn, William Shakespeare, Taylor Swift, Oscar Wilde, and Virginia Woolf.
