= Colin Westerbeck =

American art historian

Colin Leslie Westerbeck Jr. is a curator, writer, and teacher of the history of photography.

Before moving to Los Angeles, where he has taught at UCLA and USC, he was curator of photography at the Art Institute of Chicago. He is a regular contributor to publications such as the Los Angeles Times and West Magazine. Before he began writing on photography, he was a film critic for Commonweal.

== Awards ==
- Reva and David Logan Prize for New Writing on Photography.
- Art Critic's Fellowship from the National Endowment for the Arts.
- Received a grant, along with Joel Meyerowitz, from the National Endowment for the Humanities for research on the history of street photography.
- 2000: J. Dudley Johnston Award from the Royal Photographic Society for the writing of photographic criticism and history.

== Publications ==
- Westerbeck, Colin (1992). What's New, Prague. Chicago: Art Institute of Chicago. pp. 33 pages. ISBN 0-86559-114-8.
- Art Institute of Chicago; Ishimoto, Yasuhiro; Isozaki, Arata; Westerbeck, Colin; Fuminori Yokoe (1999). Yasuhiro Ishimoto: A Tale of Two Cities. Chicago, Ill: Art Institute of Chicago. ISBN 0-86559-170-9.
- Rossen, Susan F.; Colin L. Westerbeck (Author), Art Institute Of Chicago (Author) (1999). African Americans in art: selections from the Art Institute of Chicago. Chicago, Ill: The Art Institute of Chicago in association with University of Washington Press. pp. 136 pages. ISBN 0-295-97833-3.
- Renaissance jewelry in the Alsdorf Collection. Chicago, Ill: Art Institute of Chicago. 2000. pp. 136 pages. ISBN 0-86559-153-9.
- Westerbeck, Colin; Meyerowitz, Joel (2001). Bystander: a history of street photography: with a new afterword on street photography since the 1970s. Boston: Bulfinch Press. pp. 440 pages. ISBN 0-8212-2726-2.
- Westerbeck, Colin; Bey, Dawoud; James Vanderzee (2004). Van Der Zee, James (ed.). The James Van Der Zee studio. Chicago, Ill: Art Institute of Chicago. pp. 36 pages. ISBN 0-86559-210-1.
- Westerbeck, Colin; Schaffner, Ingrid (2005). Accommodations of Desire. Los Angeles: Curatorial Assistance, Inc. pp. 128 pages. ISBN 0-9707913-2-1.
- Westerbeck, Colin (2005). Joel Meyerowitz. London: Phaidon Press. pp. 128 pages. ISBN 978-0-7148-4509-8.
- Wagner, Bruce; Breisch, Kenneth A.; Keller, Judith; Westerbeck, Colin (2006). Where We Live: Photographs of America from the Berman Collection. Los Angeles: J. Paul Getty Trust: J. Paul Getty Museum. pp. 192 pages. ISBN 0-89236-854-3.
- Westerbeck, Colin (2007). Irving Penn: A Career in Photography. Chicago, Ill: Art Institute of Chicago. pp. 192 pages. ISBN 978-0-300-12236-7.
