= Charlotte Cotton =

English curator of and writer

Charlotte Cotton is an English curator of and writer.

Cotton has held positions including Head of the Wallis Annenberg Photography Department at the Los Angeles County Museum of Art, Head of Programming at The Photographers' Gallery, London, Curator of Photography at the Victoria and Albert Museum, London, and Curator-in-Residence at the Katonah Museum of Art and California Museum of Photography.

Cotton has curated a number of exhibitions on contemporary photography, and her publications include The Photograph as Contemporary Art, Imperfect Beauty, Then Things Went Quiet, Guy Bourdin, and Photography is Magic. She is also the founder of wordswithoutpictures.org (2008–09) and EitherAnd.org (2012). Words Without Pictures was published by Aperture in 2010.

== Early life and education ==
Cotton was born in the Cotswolds in England. She studied Art History at the University of Sussex in Brighton.

== Career ==
=== Victoria and Albert Museum ===
Cotton was curator of photographs at the Victoria and Albert Museum from 1993 to 2004. She started working as an intern there in 1992. She curated many exhibitions of historical and contemporary photography at the museum including: Imperfect Beauty: the making of contemporary fashion photographs (2000), Out of Japan (2002), Stepping In and Out: contemporary documentary photography (2003) and Guy Bourdin (2003).

=== The Photographers' Gallery ===
Cotton was Head of Programming at The Photographers' Gallery, London from 2004 to 2005.

=== Los Angeles County Museum of Art ===
Cotton was Curator and Head of the Wallis Annenberg Department of Photography at Los Angeles County Museum of Art (LACMA) from 2007 to 2009.

"Charlotte's career bridges the traditional and the contemporary. That is her real strength," said LACMA Director Michael Govan. "At the Victoria & Albert, she dealt with a collection of some 300,000 photographs that has great 19th century and early 20th century material, so she had a real grounding in a big museum collection and historic work. Then she gave it up to experiment and learn more about photography in the contemporary world. She has had huge experience, and she has taken risks. That's a good combination."

=== Other positions ===
Cotton has also held positions of Creative Director at the National Media Museum, UK, and Curator in Residence for International Center of Photography's new museum and events space, 250 Bowery, and Curator in Residence at Metabolic Studio, LA where she participated in a program celebrating the legacy of the Woman's Building, founded by Judy Chicago, Sheila Levrant de Bretteville and Arlene Raven. She is currently Curator-in-Residence at the California Museum of Photography, in Riverside, CA.

Cotton has been a visiting critic and scholar at numerous universities and schools in the US and the UK including: NYU Tisch, New York; CCA, San Francisco; Parsons and SVA, New York; Yale University, New Haven; UPenn, Philadelphia; and UCLA, USC, UC Irvine, Los Angeles; Farnham College, Surrey Institute of Design, UK.

== Works ==
=== The Photograph as Contemporary Art ===
The book The Photograph as Contemporary Art provides an introduction to contemporary art-photography, identifying its most important features and themes and celebrating its pluralism through an overview of its most important and innovative practitioners. The work of nearly 250 photographers is reproduced, from established artists such as Isa Genzken, Jeff Wall, Sophie Calle, Thomas Demand, Nan Goldin, and Sherrie Levine to emerging talents such Walead Beshty, Jason Evans, Lucas Blalock, Sara VanDerBeek, and Viviane Sassen.

The first edition of The Photograph as Contemporary Art was published in 2004. The third was published in 2014 and has a new introduction and extended final chapter.

The Photograph as Contemporary Art is published in nine languages.

=== Photography is Magic ===
Photography is Magic is a critical book that surveys the work of over eighty artists, all of whom have experimental approaches to photographic ideas, set within the contemporary image environment, framed by Web 2.0. Photography is Magic surveys over eighty artists whose practices are shaping the possibilities of the contemporary photographic landscape. The contributors include Elad Lassry, Sara VanDerBeek and Kate Steciw.

== Curated projects ==
Exhibitions organized and co-organized by Cotton:

- Fashion on Paper & Contemporary Fashion Photography, Victoria and Albert Museum, London, 1997
- Information Units: A digital programme exploring the V&A's Photography Collection. Devised and launched between April and November 1998
- Silver & Syrup: a selected history of photography, Victoria and Albert Museum, London, 1998/99
- Triple Exposure: Three Photographers From the Sixties, Victoria and Albert Museum, London, 1999/2000
- Attitude: A History of Posing, Victoria and Albert Museum, London, 2000/01
- Imperfect Beauty: The Making of Contemporary Fashion Photographs, Victoria and Albert Museum, London, 2000/01
- Out of Japan: Felice Beato, Masahisa Fukase, Naoya Hatakeyama, Victoria and Albert Museum, London, 2001/02
- Stepping in and Out: Contemporary Documentary Photography: Roger Ballen, Tina Barney, Donovan Wylie, Clare Richardson, Albrecht Tubke, Victoria and Albert Museum, London, 2002/03
- Guy Bourdin, Victoria and Albert Museum, London (2003); National Gallery Victoria (2003); Centre Nationale de la Photographie Paris (2004); Foam Amsterdam (2004)
- History in the Making: Mitch Epstein, Adam Broomberg and Oliver Chanarin, Ori Gersht, Zineb Sedira, Zoran Nazkovski. Circulos des Bellas Artes, Madrid PhotoEspana, 2004
- Stories from Russia: Melanie Manchot & David King, The Photographers' Gallery, London, 2005
- Art + Commerce Festival of Emerging Photographers, The Tobacco Warehouse, Brooklyn, 2005; MOC Gallery, Tokyo (2006); Fendi Gallery, Milan (2006); Matadero Madrid (2006, PHotoEspaña); Center for Photography, Stockholm (2006, XpoSweden)
- Philip-Lorca diCorcia, LACMA, Los Angeles, 2008
- The Marjorie and Leonard Vernon Collection, LACMA, Los Angeles, 2008/09
- Vanity Fair Portraits: Photographs 1913 ~ 2008, LACMA, Los Angeles, 2008/09
- A Machine Project Field Guide to the LA County Museum of Art, LACMA, Los Angeles, 2008
- EATLACMA, LACMA, Los Angeles, 2010
- Brighton Photo Fringe, Phoenix Arts, Brighton, 2011
- Krakow Photomonth: Photography in Everyday Life, Bunkier Sztuki, Krakow, 2012
- Daegu Photo Biennale: Photography Is Magic!, Daegu Arts and Culture Centre, Daegu, 2012
- Photoespaña 2014: P2P, Teatro Fernan Gomez, Madrid, 2014
- This Place,DOX Centre for Contemporary Art, Prague, 2014/15; Tel Aviv Museum, 2015; Norton Museum, Palm Beach, 2015; Brooklyn Museum, Brooklyn, 2016
- SupraEnvironmental, Katonah Museum of Art, New York, 2015/16
- Photography is Magic: Aperture Summer Open, Aperture Foundation, New York, 2016
- Public, Private, Secret, International Center of Photography, New York, 2016/17
- Close Enough: New Perspectives from 12 Women Photographers of Magnum, International Center of Photography, New York, 29 September 2022 – 9 January 2023

== Publications ==
Books that Cotton has authored and edited:

- Cotton, Charlotte (2000). 'Imperfect Beauty: The Making of Contemporary Fashion Photographs. V&A. ISBN 1851773207.
- Cotton, Charlotte (2003). Guy Bourdin. V&A. ISBN 1851773991.
- Cotton, Charlotte (2003). Then Things Went Quiet. MW Projects. ISBN 0954631102.
- Cotton, Charlotte (2005). Peek: The Art+Commerce Festival of Emerging Photographers. Art+Commerce. ISBN 0977313905. (Editor, essay)
- Cotton, Charlotte (2009). Paul Graham: A Series of Conversations between the photographer Paul Graham and Charlotte Cotton. Fabrica Madrid. ISBN 9788496466760.
- Cotton, Charlotte (2009). The Marjorie and Leonard Vernon Collection. LACMA. (Essay, published for LACMA)
- Cotton, Charlotte (2009). Words Without Pictures. LACMA. ISBN 9780875872032. (Founder of wordswithoutpictures.org, co-editor, essay, published for LACMA)
- Cotton, Charlotte (2009). The Sun as Error: Shannon Ebner in Collaboration with Dexter Sinister. LACMA. ISBN 9780875872001. (Commissioned and published for LACMA)
- Cotton, Charlotte (2009). The Machine Project Field Guide to LACMA. Machine Project Press. ISBN 9780061714573. (Essay, co-published for LACMA)
- Cotton, Charlotte (2010). Four Over One: Phil Chang. LACMA. ISBN 9780875872049. (Commissioned and published for LACMA)
- Cotton, Charlotte (2010). Bananas for Moholy Nagy: Patterson Beckwith. LACMA. (Commissioned and published for LACMA)
- Cotton, Charlotte (2012). Photography is Magic!. Daegu Photo Biennale. (Exhibition catalogue, essay, artists' biographies)
- Cotton, Charlotte (2014). The Photograph as Contemporary Art (World of Art). Thames & Hudson. ISBN 978-0500204184. (Third edition with new introduction and extended final chapter)
- Cotton, Charlotte (2014). This Place. Mack. ISBN 978-1910164136. (Exhibition catalogue, editor, essay, interviews)
- Cotton, Charlotte (2015). Photography is Magic. Aperture. ISBN 978-1597113311.
- Cotton, Charlotte (2018). Public, Private, Secret: On Photography and the Configuration of Self. Aperture. ISBN 1597114383
- Cotton, Charlotte (2018). Fashion Image Revolution. Prestel. ISBN 9783791383781
