= CJ Clarke =

British filmmaker and photographer

- Education: University of York; London College of Communication
- Occupations: Photographer; Filmmaker
- Years active: 2005–present
- Known for: Just Another Photo Festival; The Rape in India Project
- Notable work: Magic Party Place; Maya: The Birth of a Superhero

CJ Clarke is a British filmmaker, photographer and photojournalist based in London. He is known for long-term documentary projects about contemporary Britain, including the photobook Magic Party Place, and for collaborative film, photography and virtual reality works made with the artist Poulomi Basu. Their VR experience Maya: The Birth of a Superhero was selected for the inaugural Immersive Competition at the 2024 Cannes Film Festival and has won several international awards.

== Early life and education ==
Clarke studied English Literature at the University of York and later completed a master's degree in photojournalism and documentary photography at the London College of Communication. He began his career documenting his home town of Basildon, Essex.

== Career ==
Clarke's early work focused on working-class communities in England, and he has worked as a documentary and editorial photographer alongside a parallel practice in film. He is the founder of the London-based Just Another Production Company (JAPC), through which he produces and directs film, documentary and immersive work. Since the 2010s he has collaborated regularly with the artist Poulomi Basu across photography, film and virtual reality.

In 2015 Clarke co-founded, with Basu, the Just Another Photo Festival in India, a travelling festival intended to widen public access to photography. He also co-founded the Rape in India Project, a crowdsourced initiative documenting sites of sexual assault.

While his early work was grounded in documentary photography, his later collaborations with Basu — the experimental short films Centralia: Ghost Dance (2021) and Fireflies (2022) and the virtual-reality work Maya (2023) — moved into more speculative and fictional territory, combining photography, film and immersive technology.

== Major works ==
=== Magic Party Place ===
Magic Party Place is a photobook and multi-screen project developed over roughly a decade, documenting Basildon and, through it, working-class England in the period surrounding the Brexit vote. Clarke, who grew up in the town, has said that he "returned and confronted it as a stranger", approaching Basildon as "a kind of 'everyplace' that says something about contemporary England". He took the project's title from a deserted, illuminated sign he came upon at night, which he described as "proclaiming life and activity when there was none".

Although rooted in documentary, the work has a cinematic and atmospheric sensibility. Clarke has cited "cinema, TV and theater" as his major influences, and has written of standing on the town's streets "engulfed by a silence – a silence so vast that time seems to have disappeared". The photobook was widely covered on publication in 2016, with features in Time, The Guardian, Dazed, Vice and the British Journal of Photography. It is held in the collection of the Museum of Modern Art in New York. It has also been shown as a multi-screen installation. The project further gave rise to an experimental short film about Basildon and the Brexit vote, made in collaboration with Channel 4 News.

=== Blood Speaks ===
Blood Speaks: A Ritual of Exile is a transmedia project examining menstrual-exile practices and violence against women. It premiered at the Margaret Mead Film Festival and was presented at South by Southwest (SXSW) in 2019.

=== Centralia: Ghost Dance ===
Centralia: Ghost Dance (2021) is a moving-image work made in collaboration with Poulomi Basu. The work entered the collection of the Victoria and Albert Museum in London.

=== Fireflies ===
Fireflies (2022) is a two-channel experimental short film made with Poulomi Basu, in which a female astronaut crash-lands on a seemingly sentient planet and confronts her past. It won the award for Best Experimental Short at the Aesthetica Short Film Festival in 2022, and was shown alongside the VR work Maya in the exhibition reviewed by The Guardian.

=== Maya: The Birth of a Superhero ===
Maya: The Birth of a Superhero is a virtual-reality work, co-directed by Clarke and Poulomi Basu and produced by Clarke through Just Another Production Company; the screenplay is credited to Clarke, Basu and Manjeet Mann. The roughly 33-minute 6DoF experience follows a British Asian girl who develops superpowers with the onset of menstruation, using magical realism and mythic imagery to address menstrual taboos.

Clarke has described the move into virtual reality as "a natural evolution", saying that artists "evolve ... to use whatever medium suits the message", and that the work was intended to "feel like a dream". He has argued that "the power of art, the power of cinema is at its best when it's associational and abstract and based in a sense of place and emotion", qualities he considers well suited to virtual reality. The piece premiered at the 2023 Tribeca Festival, where it received a New Voices Special Jury Mention, and was later selected for SXSW in 2024 and for the inaugural Immersive Competition at the 2024 Cannes Film Festival. It won the AniDox:VR Award at the Viborg Animation Festival and the European XR Award for Best Creative Experience, both in 2024. Reviewing the related exhibition in The Guardian, Charlotte Jansen described the piece as "genuinely empowering".

== Publications ==
- Magic Party Place (2016)
- "A Matter of Perspective", in Digital Investigative Journalism: Data, Visual Analytics and Innovative Methodologies in International Reporting (2018), ed. Oliver Hahn and Florian Stalph, Palgrave Macmillan, pp. 157–169.

== Films and immersive works ==
- Blood Speaks: A Ritual of Exile (2018)
- Centralia: Ghost Dance (2021), with Poulomi Basu
- Fireflies (2022), with Poulomi Basu
- Maya: The Birth of a Superhero (2023), VR, co-director and producer

== Awards and recognition ==
- Ian Parry Award (commended)
- Magenta Flash Forward Award (commended - three times)
- Observer Hodge Photographic Award (commended - twice)
- British Journal of Photography Open Shutter Award, 2011, for the short film Cody's Story
- Best Experimental Short, Aesthetica Short Film Festival, 2022, for Fireflies
- Tribeca Immersive New Voices Special Jury Mention, 2023, for Maya: The Birth of a Superhero
- AniDox:VR Award, Viborg Animation Festival, 2024, for Maya: The Birth of a Superhero
- European XR Award for Best Creative Experience, 2024, for Maya: The Birth of a Superhero
