= Arwed Messmer =

German photographer and artist

- Born: 1964 (age 61–62); Schopfheim, Baden-Württemberg, West Germany
- Website: arwedmessmer.de/en

Arwed Messmer (born 1964) is a German photographer and artist, based in Berlin. His work primarily uses recontextualised vernacular photographs of recent historical events, found in German state archives, in order to pose questions about photography. He mainly produces books of this work, often with Annett Gröschner on the time of a divided Germany, but also exhibits it.

Messmer won the Otto Steinert Prize from the German Society for Photography in 1996, was co-winner (with Gröschner) of a DAM Architectural Book Award in 2011 and 2012, and was shortlisted for the Deutsche Börse Photography Foundation Prize in 2018.

== Life and work ==
Messmer was born in 1964 in Schopfheim in the district of Lörrach, West Germany. He moved to Berlin in 1991.

His work over the course of 25 years has dealt with issues surrounding German post-war history. For the latter 10 years he has worked primarily with utilitarian images produced by the state, which he has found in a number of archives.

In 1994 and 1995 Messmer made a series called Potsdamer Platz, Anno Zero (transl. Potsdamer Platz, Year Zero). Potsdamer Platz was an important public square and traffic intersection in the centre of Berlin that was totally destroyed during World War II and then left desolate during the Cold War era when the Berlin Wall bisected its former location. Messmer's series is concerned with this period, before it became the site of major redevelopment projects.

Messmer's 2014 book Reenactments MfS uses photographs of re-enactments of escape attempts across the Berlin Wall, and crime-scene exhibits, sourced from the Stasi Records Agency. The images were made in the course of crime investigations by the Ministry for State Security (MfS), commonly known as the Stasi, the official state security service of the German Democratic Republic (East Germany). Re-enactments were "often restaged with participation by the actual escapee after they were caught". Messmer provides new contexts for the photographs and removes their captions. The book also includes Messmer's "Revisited Places" series of photographs that he made in 2014.

Messmer's 2016 book Zelle/Cell is about the West German far-left militant organisation the Red Army Faction (RAF), also known as the Baader-Meinhof Group. It contains lesser-known photographs of the group's history between 1968 (with the 2 June Movement) and 1977. The work was shown in an exhibition titled RAF: No Evidence / Kein Beweis in June 2018 at Museum Folkwang in Essen, Germany. The critic Gerry Badger has written that "He is not attempting to reconstruct the history but play creatively, as it were, with this fascinating, but enigmatic material. . . . Messmer is questioning photography's role, both as witness, and ultimately, as art." Messmer says "My work also has an ethical dimension: What images can be shown? How can they be shown? And why should we look at them?".

== Publications ==
=== Publications by Messmer ===
- Hier beginnt die Zukunft, hier steigen wir aus. Berlin: Berlin, 2002. Annett Gröschner. Photographs by Messmer. ISBN 978-3827004208. In German.
- Johannes Schütz: Bühnen / Stages 2000 – 2007. Nuremberg: Moderne Kunst, 2008. Photographs by Messmer. ISBN 978-3940748034. In German and English.
- Eine halbe Stunde vor Berlin: Trebbin – Momentaufnahme einer Kleinstadt in der Mark Brandenburg. Berlin: Hansgert Lambert, 1993. Photographs by Messmer. ISBN 978-3-925935-19-0.
- Kontrakt 903: Erinnerung an eine strahlende Zukunft. Berlin: Kontext, 2003. Images by Messmer, text by Gröschner. ISBN 978-3931337384. In German.
- So weit kein Auge reicht: Berliner Panoramafotografien aus den Jahren 1949-1952 = As far as no eye can see. Berlinische Galerie/Dumont Literatur; Cologne: Kunst, 2008. Recorded by Fritz Tiedemann, reconstructed and interpreted by Messmer. ISBN 978-3-940208-04-0, ISBN 9783832191870. With text by Florian Ebner, Janos Frecot, Benedikt Goebel, Gröschner, Wolfgang Kil and Ursula Müller. In German, with English insert.
- Verlorene Wege. Nuremberg: Moderne Kunst, 2009. Images by Messmer, text by Gröschner. ISBN 978-3940748676. In German.
- Anonyme Mitte – Berlin: Anonymous Heart – Berlin. Nuremberg: Moderne Kunst, 2009. By Messmer. ISBN 978-3941185661. With text by Florian Ebner and Gröschner. In German and English.
- Aus anderer Sicht. Die frühe Berliner Mauer = The other view: The early Berlin Wall. Ostfildern: Hatje Cantz, 2011. Edited by Gröschner and Messmer. ISBN 978-3-7757-3207-9. With essays by Greg Bond, Olaf Briese, Florian Ebner, Matthias Flügge, Gröschner, Messmer. In German and English.
- Berlin, Fruchtstraße: am 27. März 1952/on March 27, 1952. Ostfildern: Hatje Cantz, 2012. Historical photographs by Fritz Tiedemann reconstructed and interpreted by Messmer (images) and Annett Göschner (text). Edited by Gröschner and Messmer. ISBN 978-3-7757-3472-1. With texts by Florian Ebner, Uwe Tiedemann, and Gröschner. In German and English.
- Reenactment MfS. Ostfildern: Hatje Cantz, 2014. Edited/authored by Messmer. ISBN 978-3-7757-3911-5. In German and English.
- Zelle/Cell. Berlin: Hatje Cantz, 2016. Concept and photography by Messmer. ISBN 978-3-7757-4185-9. In German and English.

=== Publications with contributions by Messmer ===
- Berlin 89/09: Kunst zwischen Spurensuche und Utopie / Art Between Traces of the Past and Utopian Futures. Includes Messmer's 1996 series "Potsdamer Platz Anno Zero" (Potsdamer Platz, Year Zero). Berlinische Gallery/Dumont Literatur; Cologne: Kunst, 2009. Edited by Guido Faßbender. ISBN 978-3832192730. In German and English.

== Awards ==
- 1996: Otto Steinert Prize from the German Society for Photography (DGPh) for his series "Potsdamer Platz, Anno Zero" (Potsdamer Platz, Year Zero)
- 2011: Co-winner with Annett Gröschner, DAM Architectural Book Award, Architectural History / Historical Catalogue category, German Architecture Museum, for Aus anderer Sicht / The Other View
- 2012: Co-winner with Annett Gröschner, DAM Architectural Book Award, Photobook prize, Editor category, for Berlin, Fruchtstraße
- 2016: Special Jurors' Mention, PhotoBook of the Year, Paris Photo–Aperture Foundation PhotoBook Awards, Paris, was awarded to Taking Stock of Power: An Other View of the Berlin Wall by Annett Gröschner and Messmer
- 2018: Shortlisted, Deutsche Börse Photography Foundation Prize 2019 for the exhibition RAF – No Evidence / Kein Beweis at Zephyr|Raum für Fotografie, Mannheim, 2017. The other shortlistees were Laia Abril, Susan Meiselas, and Mark Ruwedel.
