= Deutsche Börse Photography Foundation Prize =

Award for success in photography (1996-present)

The Deutsche Börse Photography Foundation Prize is awarded annually by the Deutsche Börse Photography Foundation and the Photographers' Gallery to a photographer who has made the most significant contribution to the photographic medium in Europe during the past year.

The prize was set up in 1996 by the Photographers' Gallery, London. From 1997 to 2004 it was called the Citigroup Photography Prize or Citibank Private Bank Photography Prize. Deutsche Börse has sponsored the competition since 2005, with a £30,000 prize. At that point it became the Deutsche Börse Photography Prize. It was renamed the Deutsche Börse Photography Foundation Prize in 2016 to reflect its new position within the a specifically established non-profit organisation.

It has been described as "the biggest of its kind in photography in Europe" and "the most prestigious".

== History ==
The prize was set up in 1996 by the Photographers' Gallery, London, with the intention of promoting the finest contemporary photography. Between 1997 and 2004, the prize was known as the Citigroup Photography Prize.

Deutsche Börse has sponsored the competition since 2005, with a £30,000 prize. At that point it was renamed the Deutsche Börse Photography Prize. It was renamed again to the Deutsche Börse Photography Foundation Prize in 2016, "to reflect its new position within the Deutsche Börse Photography Foundation, a specifically established non-profit organisation focused on the collecting, exhibiting and promoting of contemporary photography."

== Winners and shortlisted artists ==
Winners of the Citigroup Photography Prize (1997–2004):

- 1997 winner Richard Billingham, shortlisted Uta Barth, Mat Collishaw, Philip-Lorca diCorcia, Catherine Yass
- 1998 winner Andreas Gursky, shortlisted Thomas Demand, Paul Graham, Katia Liebmann, Hiroshi Sugimoto
- 1999 winner Rineke Dijkstra, shortlisted Augusto Alves da Silva, Alex Hartley, Yinka Shonibare, Paul M. Smith
- 2000 winner Anna Gaskell, shortlisted James Casebere, Jitka Hanzlová, Tim Macmillan, Tracey Moffatt
- 2001 winner Boris Mikhailov, shortlisted Roni Horn, Hellen van Meene, Jem Southam, Hannah Starkey
- 2002 winner Shirana Shahbazi, shortlisted Roger Ballen, Elina Brotherus, Philip-Lorca diCorcia, Thomas Ruff
- 2003 winner Juergen Teller, shortlisted Jitka Hanzlová, Bertien van Manen, Simon Norfolk
- 2004 winner Joel Sternfeld, shortlisted Robert Adams, Peter Fraser, David Goldblatt

Winners and shortlisted artists of the Deutsche Börse Photography Prize (2005–present):

- 2005 winner Luc Delahaye for his exhibition Luc Delahaye–Photographs at National Museum of Photography, Film & Television, Bradford, UK. Shortlisted were JH Engström, for the publication Trying to Dance (Journal, 2004); Jörg Sasse for his exhibition at Galerie Wilma Tolksdorf, Frankfurt; and Stephen Shore, for the publication Uncommon Places: The Complete Works (Thames & Hudson, 2004).
- 2006 winner Robert Adams for his exhibition Turning Back, A Photographic Journal of Re-exploration at Haus der Kunst, Munich. Shortlisted were Yto Barrada for his exhibition A Life Full of Holes – the Strait Project at Open Eye Gallery, Liverpool; Phil Collins for his exhibition yeah…..you, baby you at Milton Keynes Gallery, UK; and Alec Soth for his exhibition Sleeping by the Mississippi at Open Eye Gallery, Liverpool.
- 2007 winner Walid Raad for his exhibition The Atlas Group Project at Museum für Gegenwart, Berlin. Shortlisted were Philippe Chancel for his exhibition DPRK at Les Rencontres d'Arles, France; Anders Petersen for his exhibition À propos de Gap et de Saint-Étienne at Les Rencontres d'Arles, France; and Fiona Tan for her exhibition Mirror Maker at Landesgalerie Linz, Austria.
- 2008 winner Esko Männikkö for his exhibition Cocktails 1990–2007 at Millesgården, Stockholm. Shortlisted were John Davies for his exhibition The British Landscape at National Media Museum, Bradford, UK; Jacob Holdt, for the publication Jacob Holdt, United States 1970–1975 (Steidl, 2007); and Fazal Sheikh, for the publication Ladli (Steidl, 2007).
- 2009 winner Paul Graham, for the publication A Shimmer of Possibility (steidlMACK, 2007). Shortlisted were Emily Jacir for her exhibition Material for a Film at the 52nd Biennale of Art in Venice; Tod Papageorge for his exhibition Passing Through Eden: Photographs of Central Park at Michael Hoppen Gallery, London; and Taryn Simon for her project An American Index of the Hidden and Unfamiliar.
- 2010 winner Sophie Ristelhueber for her self-titled exhibition at Jeu de Paume, Paris. Shortlisted were Anna Fox for her exhibition Cockroach Diaries & Other Stories at Ffotogallery, Cardiff, Wales; Zoe Leonard for her exhibition Zoe Leonard: Photographs at Pinakothek der Moderne, Munich; and Donovan Wylie for his exhibition MAZE 2007/8 at Belfast Exposed, UK.
- 2011 winner Jim Goldberg for his exhibition Open See at the Photographers' Gallery, London. Shortlisted were Thomas Demand for his exhibition Nationalgalerie at Neue Nationalgalerie, Berlin; Roe Ethridge for his exhibition at Les Rencontres d'Arles, France; and Elad Lassry for his self-titled exhibition at Kunsthalle Zürich.
- 2012 winner John Stezaker for his self-titled exhibition at Whitechapel Gallery, London. Shortlisted were Pieter Hugo, for the publication Permanent Error (Prestel, 2011); Rinko Kawauchi, for the publication Illuminance (Kehrer, 2011); and Christopher Williams for his exhibition Kapitalistischer Realismus at Dům umění České Budějovice, Budweis, Czech Republic.
- 2013 winners Adam Broomberg & Oliver Chanarin, for the publication War Primer 2 (MACK, 2012). Shortlisted were Chris Killip for his exhibition What Happened – Great Britain 1970–1990 at Le Bal, Paris; Cristina de Middel, for her self-published photobook The Afronauts (2011); and Mishka Henner for his exhibition No Man's Land at FotoGrafia. Festival internazionale di Roma, MACRO, Rome.
- 2014 winner Richard Mosse for his exhibition The Enclave at the 55th Biennale of Art in Venice. Shortlisted were Alberto García-Alix, for the publication Autorretrato/Selfportrait (La Fábrica, 2014); Jochen Lempert for his self-titled exhibition at Hamburger Kunsthalle, Hamburg; and Lorna Simpson for her exhibition Lorna Simpson (Retrospective) at Jeu de Paume, Paris.
- 2015 winners Mikhael Subotzky and Patrick Waterhouse, for the publication Ponte City (Steidl, 2014). Shortlisted were Nikolai Bakharev for his exhibition at the 55th Biennale of Art in Venice; Zanele Muholi, for the publication Faces and Phases 2006–2014 (Steidl and The Walther Collection, 2014); and Viviane Sassen for her exhibition Umbra at Netherlands Photo Museum, Rotterdam.
- 2016 winner Trevor Paglen for his exhibition The Octopus at Frankfurter Kunstverein, Frankfurt. Shortlisted were Erik Kessels for his exhibition Unfinished Father at Fotografia Europea, Reggio Emilia, Italy; Laura El-Tantawy, for her self-published photobook In the Shadow of the Pyramids (2015); and Tobias Zielony for his exhibition The Citizen at the 56th Biennale of Art in Venice.
- 2017 winner Dana Lixenberg, for her publication Imperial Courts (Roma, 2015). Shortlisted: Sophie Calle, for her publication My All (Actes Sud, 2016); Awoiska van der Molen for her exhibition Blanco at Foam Fotografiemuseum Amsterdam; and Taiyo Onorato and Nico Krebs for their exhibition Eurasia at Fotomuseum Winterthur, Switzerland.
- 2018 winner Luke Willis Thompson for his exhibition autoportrait at Chisenhale Gallery, London. Shortlisted: Mathieu Asselin, for his publication Monsanto: A Photographic Investigation (Actes Sud, 2017); Rafał Milach for his exhibition Refusal at Atlas Sztuki Gallery, Łódź, Poland; and Batia Suter, for her publication Parallel Encyclopedia #2 (Roma, 2016).
- 2019 winner Susan Meiselas, for her exhibition Mediations at Galerie nationale du Jeu de Paume, Paris. Shortlisted: Laia Abril, for her publication On Abortion (Dewi Lewis Publishing, 2017); Arwed Messmer, for his exhibition RAF – No Evidence / Kein Beweis at Zephyr – Raum für Fotografie, Mannheim; and Mark Ruwedel, for his exhibition Artist and Society: Mark Ruwedel at Tate Modern, London.
- 2020 winner: Mohamed Bourouissa for his exhibition Free Trade at Rencontres d'Arles. Shortlisted: Anton Kusters for his exhibition The Blue Skies Project at Fitzrovia Chapel, London; Mark Neville for his publication Parade (Centre d'Art GwinZegal, 2019); and Clare Strand for her exhibition The Discrete Channel with Noise at PHotoEspaña, Madrid.
- 2021 winner: Cao Fei's exhibition Blueprints at Serpentine Galleries, London in 2020. Shortlisted: Poulomi Basu's Centralia (Dewi Lewis, 2020); Alejandro Cartagena's A Small Guide to Homeownership (Velvet Cell, 2020); and Zineb Sedira's exhibition Standing Here Wondering Which Way to Go at Jeu de Paume, Paris in 2019.
- 2022 winner: Deana Lawson for her exhibition Centropy, shown at Kunsthalle, Basel. Shortlisted: Gilles Peress for the publication Whatever You Say, Say Nothing (Steidl, 2021); Jo Ractliffe for her publication Photographs 1980s – now (Steidl/The Walther Collection, 2021); and Anastasia Samoylova for her exhibition FloodZone at the Multimedia Art Museum, Moscow.
- 2023 winner: Samuel Fosso for his exhibition Samuel Fosso at the Maison européenne de la photographie. Shortlisted: Bieke Depoorter for her exhibition A Chance Encounter at C/O Berlin; Arthur Jafa for his exhibition Live Evil at Luma, Arles; and Frida Orupabo for her exhibition I have seen a million pictures of my face and still I have no idea at Fotomuseum Winterthur.
- 2024 winner: Lebohang Kganye for the exhibition Haufi nyana? I've come to take you home at Foam, Amsterdam, The Netherlands. Shortlisted: Valie Export for the exhibition Valie Export – The Photographs at Fotomuseum Winterthur, Switzerland; Gauri Gill and collaborator Rajesh Vangad for a co-authored book, Fields of Sight (Edition Patrick Frey, 2023); and Hrair Sarkissian for the exhibition The Other Side of Silence at Bonnefanten Museum, Maastricht, The Netherlands.

== Associated publications ==
- Deutsche Börse Photography Foundation Prize 2016. London: the Photographers' Gallery, 2016. Photographs by Laura El-Tantawy, Erik Kessels, Trevor Paglen, and Tobias Zielony. With essays on the artists by Yasmine El Rashidi, Francesco Zanot, Tom Holert, and Florian Ebner.
- Deutsche Börse Photography Foundation Prize 2017 Catalogue. London: the Photographers' Gallery, 2017. Photographs by Dana Lixenberg, Sophie Calle, Taiyo Onarato and Nico Krebs, and Awoiska van der Molen. With texts by Laurie Anderson, Stanley Wolukau-Wanambwa, Yve Lomax and Jason Evans.
