= Laia Abril =

Spanish photographer and artist

Laia Abril (born 1986) is a Catalan artist whose work relates to bio-politics, grief and women's rights. Her books include The Epilogue (2014), which documents the indirect victims of eating disorders; and a long-term project A History of Misogyny which includes On Abortion (2018), about the repercussions of abortion controls in many cultures; and On Rape (2022) about gender-based stereotypes and myths, as well as the failing structures of law and order, that perpetuate rape culture.

On Abortion won the Photobook of the Year award at the Paris Photo–Aperture Foundation PhotoBook Awards. In 2018, she was awarded the Tim Hetherington Trust's Visionary Award to work on On Rape. For a History Of Misogyny, in 2019 she was awarded the Royal Photographic Society's Hood Medal and in 2020 she was awarded the Paul Huf Award from Foam Fotografiemuseum Amsterdam. In 2023, she won the Premio Nacional de Fotografía (National Photography Award) from Spain's Ministry of Culture.

== Life and work ==
Abril was born in 1986 in Barcelona, Spain. She gained a degree in journalism in Barcelona. She moved to New York City to study photography at the International Center of Photography. In 2009 she enrolled at Fabrica research centre, the artist residency of Benetton in Italy, where she worked as a staff photographer and consultant photo editor at Colors magazine for five years.

Since 2010, Abril worked on various projects exploring the subject of eating disorders: A Bad Day, a short film about a young girl struggling with bulimia; Thinspiration (2012), which explores the use of photography in pro-ana websites; and The Epilogue (2014), documenting the indirect victims of eating disorders, through the story of the Robinson family and the aftermath of the death of Cammy Robinson to bulimia. Critic Sean O'Hagan, wrote in The Guardian, that The Epilogue "... is a sombre and affecting photobook ... dense and rewarding ... At times, it makes for a painful read. From time to time, I had to put it down, take a breather. But I kept going back."

Her long-term project A History of Misogyny includes Chapter One: On Abortion, about the repercussions of abortion controls in many different cultures; and Chapter Two: On Rape: and Institutional Failure, "a visualisation of the origin of gender-based stereotypes and myths, as well as the failing structures of law and order, that continue to perpetuate rape culture." On Rape was informed by the gang-rape of an 18-year old woman in Spain in 2016 where the perpetrators were charged with the lesser offence of 'sexual abuse' due to lack of evidence of violence. This case led to Spain's #MeToo movement. On Rape was published as a book by Dewi Lewis.

== Publications ==
=== Books by Abril ===
- Thinspiration. Self-published zine, 2012. Designed in collaboration with art director Ramon Pez and Guillermo Brotons.
- Tediousphilia. Lausanne: Musée de l'Élysée, 2014. ISBN 978-2883501058. Designed in collaboration with art director Pez.
- The Epilogue. Stockport: Dewi Lewis, 2014. ISBN 978-1907893544. Designed in collaboration with art director Pez.
- Lobismuller. Mexico City; Barcelona: Editorial RM, 2016. ISBN 978-8416282647. With a text by Abril and designed in collaboration with art director Pez.
- A History of Misogyny: Chapter One: On Abortion. Stockport: Dewi Lewis, 2018. ISBN 978-1-911306-24-5.
- A History of Misogyny: Chapter Two: On Rape: and Institutional Failure. Stockport: Dewi Lewis, 2022. ISBN 9781911306870.
- On Mass Hysteria. Dewi Lewis, 2024. ISBN 9781916915114.
- Leer las imágenes. Revista 5W, 2024. ISBN 9788412362398. Spanish. Co-authored with Santi Palacios and with illustrator Cinta Fosch.

=== Catalogues and publications with others ===
- The Afronauts by Cristina de Middel. Self-published 2012. Creative Direction and editing in collaboration with Pez.
- From Here On. Madrid: RM, 2013. Exhibition catalogue for From Here On, Centre d'Art Santa Mònica, Barcelona, curated by Joan Fontcuberta, Erik Kessels, Martin Parr, Joachim Schmid and Clément Chéroux. (Note: The catalogue for From Here On is reproduced here (Issuu).)
- Diccionario de Fotógrafos Españoles. Madrid: La Fabrica, 2014.
- Under 35 Madrid: Ivorypress, 2015.
- The Post-photographic condition by Joan Fontcuberta. Montreal: Mois de la Photo, 2015.
- Laia Abril. PHotoBolsillo. Madrid: La Fabrica, (Note: Not to be confused with Fabrica research centre in Italy, where Abril was enrolled.) 2016. ISBN 978-8416248605. Spanish.
- Featured in Aperture magazine #225, Winter 2016, "On Feminism."
- Fenómeno Fotolibro Mexico City; Barcelona: Editorial RM, 2017.
- The Backway. RM, 2022. ISBN 9788417975913. Spanish. Edited by Laia Abril with contributions by the photographer, Xavier Aldekoa.

== Exhibitions ==
=== Solo exhibitions ===
- On Rape, FOAM Museum, Amsterdam
- On Rape, Biennale de l'Image Possible, Liege
- On Rape, Les Filles du Calvaire, París, 2019
- Suyay Centre de la Photographie de Genève, November 2018.
- On Abortion, PhotoIreland, Dublin, Ireland, 2018
- On Abortion, City of Women, Ljubjiana, Slovenia, 2017
- On Abortion, Les Rencontres d'Arles, France, 2016
- Lobismuller Images Festival, Vevey, Switzerland, 2016
- Tediousphilia, Musée de l'Elysée, Laussanne, Suiza, 2015

=== Group exhibitions or exhibitions during festivals ===
- From Here On, Centre d'Art Santa Mónica, February 2013. Curated by Joan Fontcuberta, Erik Kessels, Joachim Schmid and Martin Parr.
- Fotografia 2.0, PHotoEspaña, Madrid, June 2014. Curated by Joan Fontcuberta. With Diego Collado, Pablo Chacón, Manuel Fernández, Miguel Ángel García, Alejandro Guijarro, Albert Gusi, Juana Ghost, Roc Herms, Darius Koehli, Reinaldo Loureiro, Daniel Mayrit, Oscar Monzón, Noelia Pérez, Jordi Pou, Arturo Rodríguez, Txema Salvans, Miguel Ángel Tornero, Jon Uriarte and Fosi Vegue.
- On Identity, Gallery Sous Les Etoiles, New York, September–October 2014. With Jen Davis, Olya Ivanova, Lindsay Morris and Chris Rijksen.
- A History of Misogyny, Chapter One: On Abortion, Rencontres d'Arles, Arles, France, 2016.
- Situations, Fotomuseum Winterthur, 2016
- Las 17, CaixaForum Barcelona, Barcelona, Spain, September–December 2017.
- Deutsche Börse Photography Foundation Prize, The Photographers' Gallery, London, March–June 2019. With Susan Meiselas, Arwed Messmer, and Mark Ruwedel.
- History of Misogeny, Ballarat International Foto Biennale in the National Centre for Photography, Australia, 2019
- What remains. Moderna Museet, Stockholm, September 2025. With Emily Jacir and Teresa Margolles.

== Awards ==
- 2014: Shortlisted, First PhotoBook award, Paris Photo–Aperture Foundation PhotoBook Awards, Paris for The Epilogue.
- 2016: Revelación Award PhotoEspaña.
- 2018: Tim Hetherington Trust's Visionary Award, an award of £20000 to work on A History Of Misogyny, Chapter 2: On Rape Culture.
- 2018: Shortlisted, Deutsche Börse Photography Prize 2019 for A History of Misogyny: Chapter One: On Abortion. The other shortlistees were Susan Meiselas, Arwed Messmer, and Mark Ruwedel.
- 2018: Photobook of the Year award, Paris Photo–Aperture Foundation PhotoBook Awards, Paris for A History of Misogyny: Chapter One: On Abortion.
- 2019: Hood Medal, Royal Photographic Society
- 2020: Paul Huf Award from Foam Fotografiemuseum Amsterdam
- 2023: Winner, Premio Nacional de Fotografía (National Photography Award) from Spain's Ministry of Culture. The award, valued at 30,000 euros, recognized her work in artistic research, particularly her focus on themes of discrimination and suffering, often focusing on women's issues.

== Collections ==
Abril's work is held in the following public collection:

- Centre Pompidou, Paris, France.
- Fotomuseum Winterthur, Winterthur, Switzerland.
