= Alberto García-Alix =

Spanish photographer

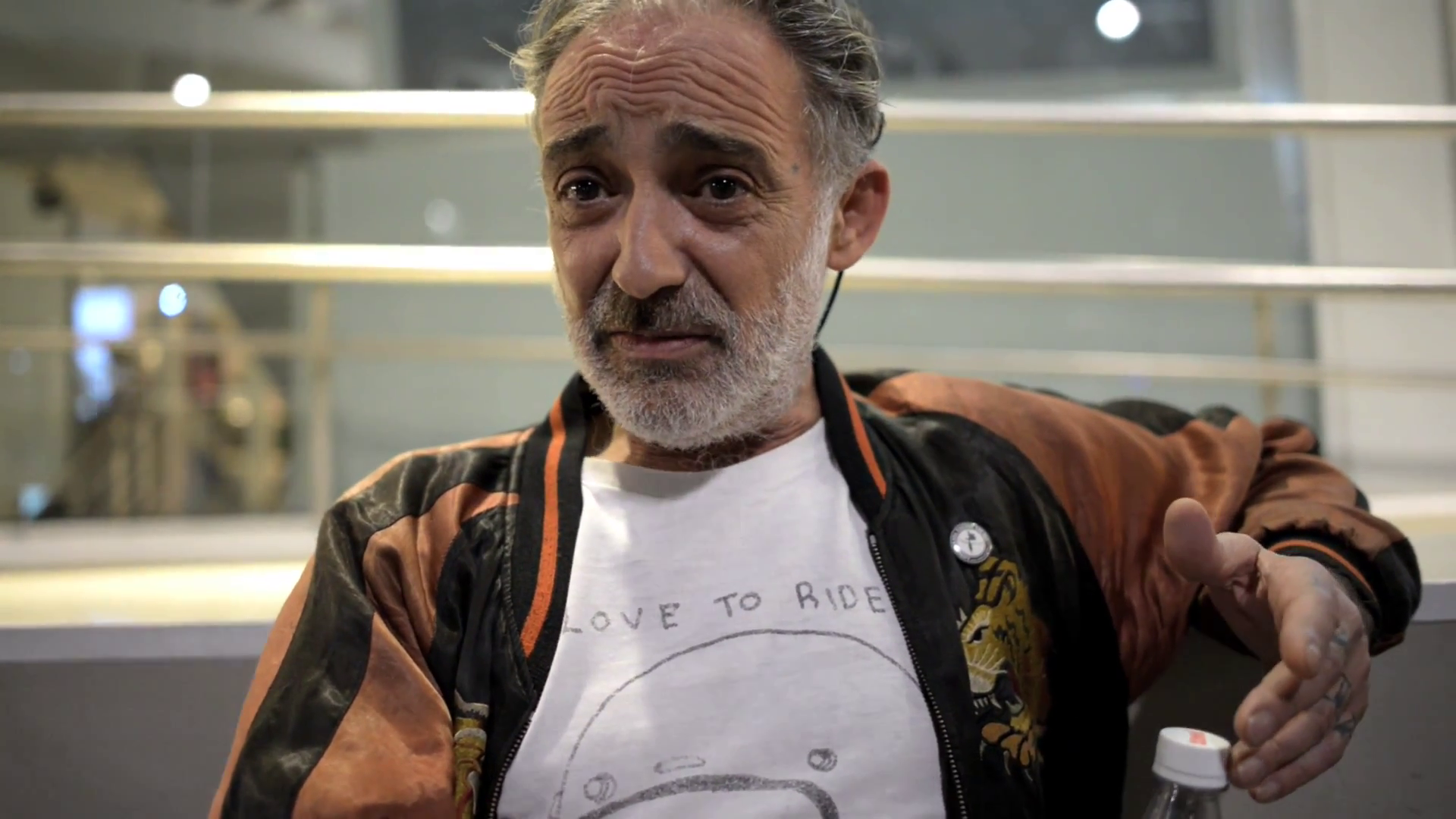
Alberto García-Alix in 2013

Alberto García-Alix (born 1957) is a Spanish photographer from León, Spain. He won the National Photography Award in 1999.

His work has reached different countries and has been praised by publications such as Vogue, British Journal of Photography or Vanity Fair. A motorcycle and portrait lover, his Leica and Hasselblad cameras have immortalized important national and international artists. He has always been inspired by bikes, tattoos, music and the night.

He defines his portraits as a confrontation with his own model. Garcia-Alix is one of the leading figures of the movement known as La Movida Madrileña leaving behind well-known and powerful images of this cultural movement's youth. Among its members are some of his friends, who subsequently have become renowned personalities in different fields: Pedro Almodóvar, Rossy de Palma, Emma Suárez, Camarón de la Isla and many others. Often violently shameless, his works are recurrently raw and naked portraits. They are often considered to be overreactions but their expressive power and graphic effectiveness is undeniable.

García-Alix has devoted his entire career to black and white photography as personal and social documentation. Since his long stays in France and China in 2007 and 2008, he has been experimenting with video by documenting his images accompanied by his own texts and voice. An example of his video-art was showcased at it his exhibition De donde no se vuelve (2008) at the Reina Sofía Museum in Madrid.

== Awards and recognition ==
- National Photography Award (Spain) (1999)
- Especial Guest for El País Newspaper at the Contemporary Art Fair in Madrid (ARCO)
- Shortlisted for the Deutsche Börse Photography Prize 2014 for his book Autorretrato/Self-Portrait, La Fabrica Editorial (2013).

== Books ==
- Autorretrato/Self-Portrait, La Fabrica Editorial, 2013.
