= Jim Goldberg =

American artist and photographer (born 1953)

- Born: James Goldberg; 1953 (age 72–73); New Haven, Connecticut, United States
- Education: San Francisco Art Institute
- Known for: Fine art photography, educator
- Partner: Alessandra Sanguinetti
- Website: www.jimgoldberg.com

Jim Goldberg (born 1953) is an American artist and photographer, whose work reflects long-term, in-depth collaborations with neglected, ignored, or otherwise outside-the-mainstream populations.

Goldberg has received three National Endowment of the Arts Fellowships in Photography, a Guggenheim Fellowship, the Henri Cartier-Bresson Award, and the Deutsche Börse Photography Prize. His works have been exhibited, published, and collected internationally.

Goldberg is Professor Emeritus at the California College of the Arts, and has been a member of the Magnum Photos agency since 2002. He lives and works in the greater San Francisco Bay Area.

== Education ==
Goldberg studied at San Francisco Art Institute with Larry Sultan, a conceptually oriented photographer.

== Artistic career ==
Goldberg is best known for his photography books, multi-media exhibitions, and video installations, among them: Rich and Poor (1985), Nursing Home, Raised by Wolves (1995), Hospice, and Open See (2009). His work often examines the lives of neglected, ignored, or otherwise outside-the-mainstream populations through long-term, in depth collaborations which investigate the nature of American myths about class, power, and happiness.

Goldberg is part of an experimental documentary movement in photography, using a straightforward, cinéma vérité approach, based on a fundamentally narrative understanding of photography. The individuality of the subjects emerges in his works, "forming a context within which the viewer may integrate the unthinkable into the concept of self. Thus portrayed, this terrifying other is restored as a universal."

Goldberg's work was featured with that of Robert Adams and Joel Sternfeld in a 1984 exhibition at the Museum of Modern Art entitled Three Americans; the exhibition was described as "a show of politically charged and socially conscious images."

His 1985 book Rich and Poor, re-released by Steidl in an expanded edition in 2014, includes photographs of people in their homes along with handwritten comments by them about their lives. For example, the handwriting under the photograph reproduced on the front cover reads "I keep thinking where we went wrong. We have no one to talk to now, however, I will not allow this loneliness to destroy me,— I STILL HAVE MY DREAMS. I would like an elegant home, a loving husband and the wealth I am used to. Countess Vivianna de Bronville." Although the book received one mixed review shortly after publication, other reviews were positive, and it was later selected as one of the greatest photobooks of the 20th century.

The photographs in a 1986 exhibition of Goldberg's The Nursing Home Series were accompanied by handwritten text by the nursing home residents who were the subjects of the photographs. A review of a 1990 exhibition Shooting Back: Photography by and About the Homeless at the Washington Project for the Arts characterized the exhibition as "Issue Art" and characterized Goldberg as "a superior Issue Artist because he's a superior artist."

A major mixed-media exhibition by Goldberg concerning at risk and homeless youth in California entitled Raised by Wolves began traveling in 1995 and was accompanied by a book of the same title. A review of the exhibition at the Corcoran Gallery of Art noted that Goldberg made reference to other artists and photographers; used photographs, videos, objects, and texts to convey meaning; and "let his viewers feel, in some corner of their psyches, the lure of abject lowliness, the siren call of pain." Although the accompanying book received one mixed review shortly after publication, it was described as "a heartbreaking novel with pictures", and in The Photobook: A History, Martin Parr and Gerry Badger praised it as "complex and thoughtful."

A 1999 mixed media installation at the San Francisco Arts Commission gallery entitled "57/78/97" explored race relations in the United States, including the Little Rock Crisis of 1957, the 1978 Regents of the University of California v. Bakke decision, and the year following the passage of California Proposition 209 (1996) concerning affirmative action.

Selected photographs from a series by Goldberg called "Open See," concerning refugees, immigrants, and trafficked people, were first exhibited in San Francisco in 2007. One review stated that the photographs may leave the viewer "paralyzed by uncertainty about what might alleviate the injustices" depicted. Part of the series came to be known as "Open See", and Goldberg's book of that title was published in 2009 by Steidl.

In 2013 Goldberg was an artist in residence at Yale University Art Gallery with Donovan Wylie. They each created a body of work based in New Haven. In Candy, Goldberg, a New Haven native, creates a multilayered photo-novel of aspiration and disillusionment, interspersing Super 8 film stills, images of New Haven's urban landscape, annotated Polaroid portraits, and collaged archival materials to explicate the rise and fall of American cities in the 20th century. Goldberg considers New Haven's quest to become a "model city" of America, contrasting its civic aspirations with its citizens' lived realities.

Goldberg was a Professor Emeritus of Photography and Fine Arts at the California College of the Arts from 1987 to 2014 and has been a full member of the Magnum Photos agency since 2006. He lives and works in the Bay Area. His fashion, editorial and advertising work has appeared in publications including W, Details, Flaunt, The New York Times Magazine, Esquire, Rebel, GQ, The New Yorker and Dazed and Confused.

== Personal life ==
As of 2023, Goldberg lives on a farm in Sonoma County, California with his partner Alessandra Sanguinetti, his daughter Ruby, and Sanguinetti's daughter Cat.

== Publications ==
=== Publications by Goldberg ===
- Rich and Poor.
  - New York: Random House, 1985. ISBN 0-394-74156-0.
  - Göttingen, Germany: Steidl, 2014. ISBN 978-3869306889. Expanded edition.
- Raised by Wolves. Zurich and New York: Scalo, 1995. ISBN 1-881616-50-9.
- It Ended Sad, But I Love Where it Began. Kin series, book 4. Oakland, CA: These Birds Walk, 2007.
- Open See. Göttingen, Germany: Steidl, 2009. ISBN 978-3-86521-826-1.
- 134 Ways to Forget. Kamakura, Japan: Super Labo, 2011. ISBN 978-4-905052-30-2. Edition of 700 copies.
- Proof. New York: International Center of Photography, 2013. OCLC 2036576758. Zine format. Edition of 1000 copies.
- Polaroids from Haiti. One Picture Book 84. Portland, OR: Nazraeli, 2014. ISBN 978-1-59005-392-8.
- The Last Son. Kanagawa, Japan: Super Labo, 2016. ISBN 978-4-905052-92-0.
- Candy. New Haven, CT: Yale, 2017. ISBN 978-0300222999. A two-volume set with Donovan Wylie's A Good and Spacious Land.
- Ruby Every Fall. Paso Robles: Nazraeli Press, 2016. Edition of 100 copies.
- Raised By Wolves Bootleg. Self-published, 2016. Edition of 500 copies.
- Darrell and Particia. San Francisco: Pier 24 Photography, 2018. Edition of 1,500 copies.
- Gene. Self-published. Edition of 250 copies.
- Fingerprint. London: Stanley/Barker, 2020. Box set of 45 facsimile Polaroids.
- Coming and Going. London: Mack, 2023. ISBN 978-1912339778.

=== Publications paired with others ===
- Candy. New Haven, CT: Yale, 2017. ISBN 978-0300222999. A two-volume set with Donovan Wylie's A Good and Spacious Land.

=== Publications with contributions by Goldberg ===
- Hospice: a photographic inquiry. Boston: Little, Brown, in association with the Corcoran Gallery of Art and National Hospice Foundation, 1996. ISBN 0-8212-2259-7. With Nan Goldin, Sally Mann, Jack Radcliffe, and Kathy Vargas.
- War is only half the story: the Aftermath Project. Volume 1. New York: Aperture, 2008. ISBN 978-1-59711-042-6. With Wolf Böwig.
- Here. San Francisco: Pier 24 Photography, 2011. ISBN 978-0-9839917-0-0. Exhibition Guide.
- About Face. San Francisco: Pier 24 Photography, 2012. ISBN 978-0-9839917-1-7. Exhibition Guide.
  - About Face. San Francisco: Pier 24 Photography, 2014. ISBN 978-0-9839917-2-4. Edition of 1000 copies. Exhibition Catalog.
- Rochester 585/716: A Postcard from America Project. New York: Aperture; San Francisco: Pier 24 Photography, 2015. ISBN 978-1-59711-340-3. Edition of 1000 copies.

== Awards and grants ==
- 1980 National Endowment for the Arts (NEA) Fellowship in Photography.
- 1983 Ruttenberg Fellowship.
- 1985 Cambridge Art Council Commission.
- 1985 Guggenheim Fellowship.
- 1989 Mother Jones Photography Award.
- 1989 Art Matters grant.
- 1990 National Endowment for the Arts (NEA) Fellowship in Photography.
- 1990 California Arts Council Fellowship.
- 1992 Glen Eagles Foundation Grant.
- 1992 Art Matters grant.
- 1995 Ernst Haas Award (Photography Book of the Year for Raised by Wolves).
- 1996 Eureka Fellowship, Fleishhaker Foundation.
- 1996 Gerbode Foundation Grant.
- 2001 The Art Council Award.
- 2006 Documentary Photography Project Distribution Grant, Open Society Institute.
- 2007 HCB Award, Henri Cartier-Bresson Foundation.
- 2011 Deutsche Börse Photography Prize.

== Exhibitions ==
- 1979: Nova Gallery, Vancouver, Canada.
- 1980: Equivalents Gallery, Seattle, WA.
- 1981: OK Harris Gallery, New York.
- 1981: Bakersfield College, Bakersfield, CA.
- 1982: Blue Sky Gallery, Portland, OR.
- 1984: Houston Center for Photography, Houston, TX.
- 1984: Indiana University, Bloomington, United States.
- 1984: Friends of Photography Gallery, Carmel, CA.
- 1985: Ithaca College, Ithaca, United States.
- 1985: De Saisset Museum, Santa Clara, United States.
- 1987: Akron Art Museum, Akron, United States.
- 1987: Western Washington University, Bellingham, United States.
- 1988: Washington Project for the Arts, Washington, D.C.
- 1988: Invisible People, Museum of Photographic Arts, San Diego, CA.
- 1989: Capp Street Project, San Francisco, CA.
- 1989: University of Texas Health Science Center, Houston, TX.
- 1990: Shooting Back: Photography by and About the Homeless, Washington Project for the Arts, Washington, D.C.
- 1990: Art at the Anchorage, Creative Time, New York.
- 1991: Art in General, New York.
- 1995: Raised by Wolves, Corcoran Gallery of Art, Washington, D.C.; Museum of Design Zürich, Switzerland.
- 1996: Jim Goldberg: Raised by Wolves, Parco Gallery, Tokyo, Japan; PaceWildenstein/MacGill, New York; Addison Gallery of American Art, Andover, United States.
- 1997: Raised by Wolves, San Francisco Museum of Modern Art, San Francisco, CA; Los Angeles County Museum of Art, Los Angeles, CA; Pace/Wildenstein/MacGill, Los Angeles, CA.
- 1999: 57/78/97, San Francisco Arts Commission Gallery, San Francisco, CA.
- 2004: Two Stories, Pace/MacGill Gallery, New York.
- 2005: In the Open See, Stephen Bulger Gallery, Toronto, Canada.
- 2007: The New Europeans, Stephen Wirtz Gallery, San Francisco, CA.
- 2009: Raised By Wolves, Rencontres d'Arles, Arles, France.
- 2009: Open See, The Photographers' Gallery, London.
- 2009: Open See, Fondation Henri Cartier-Bresson, Paris.
- 2010: Jim Goldberg, Parco 2, Pordenone Contemporary Art Exhibition Site Via Bertossi, Pordenone, Friuli-Venezia Giulia, Italy, November 2010 – January 2011.
- 2011: Here., Pier 24 Photography, San Francisco, CA, May 2011 – January 2012
- 2024-2025: The ’70s Lens: Reimagining Documentary Photography, National Gallery of Art

== Collections ==
Goldberg's work is held in the following public collections:

- Addison Gallery of American Art, Andover, USA
- Art Institute of Chicago, Chicago, IL: 30 prints (as of August 2019)
- Berkeley Art Museum and Pacific Film Archive, Berkeley, CA
- Library of Congress, Washington, D.C.
- Light Work, Syracuse, USA: 2 prints (as of August 2019)
- Milwaukee Art Museum, Milwaukee, WI: 10 prints (as of August 2019)
- Museum of Fine Arts, Boston, MA
- Museum of Modern Art, New York: 30 prints (as of August 2019)
- National Gallery of Art, Washington, D.C.
- Nelson-Atkins Museum of Art, Kansas City, USA: 3 prints (as of August 2019)
- Pier 24 Photography, San Francisco, CA
- San Francisco Museum of Modern Art, San Francisco, CA
- Smithsonian American Art Museum, Washington D.C.: 30 prints (as of August 2019)
- Whitney Museum of American Art, New York
