= Just Another Photo Festival =

Indian photography festival

Just Another Photo Festival is an Indian photography festival, co-founded by Manik Katyal, Poulomi Basu and CJ Clarke in 2015. It aims to democratise access to visual media. The festival is not always held in the same location: 2015 in Delhi, 2016 in Varanasi, 2017 in Kolkata, and 2018 was scheduled to be held in Kolkata.

In 2015, a director of the event, Manik Katyal, stepped down after being caught up in dozens of sexual harassment allegations.
