= Alejandro Cartagena =

Mexican photographer

Alejandro Cartagena (born 1977) is a Dominican Republic-born Mexican photographer. His work is held in the collections of the Museum of Contemporary Photography in Chicago, Museum of Fine Arts, Houston, San Francisco Museum of Modern Art, and Santa Barbara Museum of Art. Cartagena has been shortlisted for the 2021 Deutsche Börse Photography Foundation Prize.

== Work ==
Cartagena is interested in the "effects of suburban sprawl on population growth and the environment in his home city" of Monterrey, Mexico. For Carpoolers (2014) he photographed construction workers from above, travelling to work along Mexican Federal Highway 85 in the back of their contractors' trucks, in 2011. Highway 85 links the city centre and its wealthier parts with the surrounding suburban sprawl.

== Publications ==
=== Books of work by Cartagena ===
- Suburbia Mexicana. Daylight/Photolucida, 2010. ISBN 9780983231608. With an introduction by Karen Irvine, an essay by Gerardo Montiel Klint and a transcript of an interview by Lisa Uddin. Edition of 2000 copies.
- Carpoolers. Self-published, 2014.
- Before the War. Self-published, 2015. Edition of 200 copies.
- Headshots. Self-published, 2015.
- Santa Barbara Return Jobs Back to US. Skinnerboox, 2016. ISBN 9788894134124. With an essay by Jonathan Blaustein. Edition of 500 copies.
- Rivers of Power. Newwer, 2016. ISBN 9780996669719. Edition of 500 copies.
- A Guide to Infrastructure and Corruption. Velvet Cell, 2017. ISBN 978-1-908889-53-9. Edition of 500 copies.
- Santa Barbara Shame on US. Skinnerboox, 2017. ISBN 978-88-94895-05-6. With an essay by Blaustein. Edition of 500 copies.
- A Small Guide to Homeownership: Case Study: Mexico. Velvet Cell 2020. With essays by Fernando Gallegos and Cartagena. First edition, first printing. First edition, second printing edition of 600 copies.
- Santa Barbara Save US. Skinnerboox, 2020. ISBN 978-88-94895-41-4. With an essay by Blaustein. Edition of 800 copies.
- Suburban Bus. Velvet Cell, 2021. Edition of 500 copies. ISBN 978-1-908889-84-3.

=== Other publications by Cartagena ===
- We Love Our Employees. Mexico City: Gato Negro 2019. Photographs by Alberto Flores Varela.
- Insurrection Nation. Studio Cartagena, 2021. Magazine.

== Awards ==
- 2021: Shortlisted, Deutsche Börse Photography Foundation Prize, London for Centralia; along with Poulomi Basu, Cao Fei, and Zineb Sedira

== Collections ==
Cartagena's work is held in the following permanent collections:

- San Francisco Museum of Modern Art, San Francisco: 7 prints (as of July 2021)
- Museum of Contemporary Photography, Chicago: 8 prints (as of July 2021)
- Museum of Fine Arts, Houston: 3 prints (as of July 2021)
- Santa Barbara Museum of Art: 2 prints (as of July 2021)
