= Ben Jay Crossman =

South African artist (born 1979)

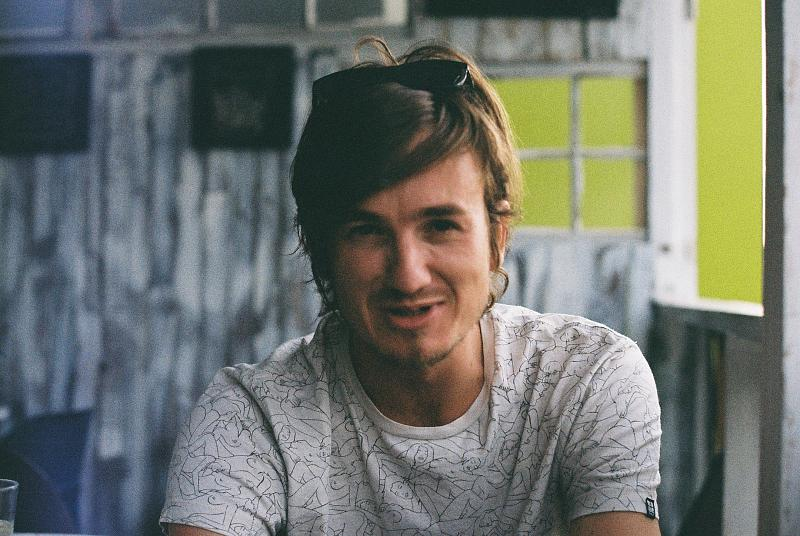
- Crossman in 2009
- Born: 21 July 1979 (age 46)
- Occupations: Artist, director

Ben Jay Crossman is a British-born South-African-raised graffiti-style street artist, concept artist, illustrator, photographer, film producer, and director, known for his collaborations with Roger Ballen and Die Antwoord.

== Works ==
=== Veronika ===
Between 2010 and 2015, Crossman painted his graffiti-style street art under the moniker ‘a boy named Veronika’.

A short film about ‘a boy named Veronika’, directed by Crossman, created for the 48 Hour Film Project Johannesburg 2012, achieved second place overall as well as awards for editing, special effects, and sound design.

=== Streets of Fietas ===
Between 2010 and 2012, Crossman filmed and released ‘The Streets of Fietas’.

The three part short series follows the lives of those who contribute to and are affected by the vicious cycle of poverty, crime, and drug use in Fietas, one of Johannesburg’s poorest suburbs.

=== Van Coke Kartel ===
In 2013 Crossman filmed and directed music videos for Van Coke Kartel, ‘Sweef’ featuring ‘Odd Art’, and ‘Chaos’ featuring Jack Parow.

=== Roger Ballen ===
Working in collaboration with Roger Ballen on his multi-year art project in the slums of South Africa, Crossman directed, filmed and edited Roger Ballen's Asylum of the Birds (2014) and Roger Ballen's Outland (2015).

=== Die Antwoord ===
Between 2009 and 2016, Crossman worked with and toured with Die Antwoord as art curator, photographer and videographer.
