= Roger Ballen =

American–South African photographer (born 1950)

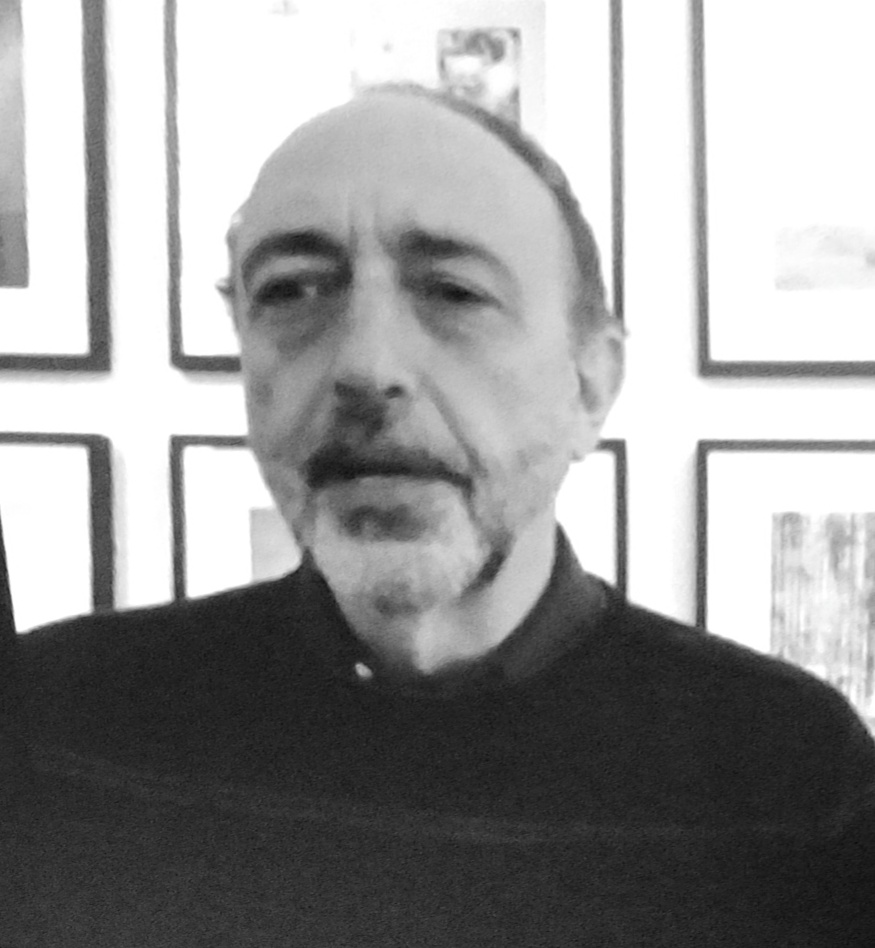
- Ballen in 2015
- Born: April 11, 1950 (age 76); New York City, New York, U.S.
- Education: University of California, Berkeley; Colorado School of Mines
- Occupation: Photographer/artist
- Notable work: Dorps: Small Towns of South Africa; Platteland; Outland; Shadow Chamber; Boarding House; Asylum of the Birds; The Theatre of Apparitions; Ballenesque, Roger Ballen: A Retrospective; The World According to Roger Ballen
- Spouse: Lynda Ballen
- Website: www.rogerballen.com

Roger Ballen (born April 11, 1950) is an American artist living in Johannesburg, South Africa, and working in its surrounds since the 1970s.

== Biography ==
Ballen was born in New York City to Irving Ballen and Adrienne Ballen (née Miller), and was raised as Jewish. His father was an attorney and the founding partner of McLaughlin, Stern. His mother was a member of the photo agency Magnum from 1963 to 1967 prior to opening the Photography House Gallery with Inge Bondi in New York City in 1968. Ballen became acquainted with the photographs of Andre Kertesz, Edward Steichen, Paul Strand, Elliot Erwitt, Bruce Davidson and Henri Cartier-Bresson either from published photographs in albums or through personal acquaintance. He attended Scarborough School, New York, and went to Camp Stinson during his childhood summers. At age 13, he received his first camera, and was soon after employed for a first commercial job of photographing McDonald's, Mamaroneck, New York. Ballen was interested in the realism of Rembrandt from a young age, and was drawn to photographing elderly men. He recalls that one of the most "vivid and pivotal moment[s] in his life occurred in 1968 when [his] parents gave him a Nikon FTn camera for [his] high school graduation. On the very same day [he] went to the outskirts of Sing Sing Prison near New York city to take photographs".

He later studied psychology at the University of California, Berkeley, which was an epicenter for the 1960s counter-culture. Here, he was exposed to R. D. Laing's anti-psychiatry movement, Jung's concept of the "collective unconscious", the Theatre of the Absurd (Pinter, Beckett and Ionesco) and existential philosophers, such as Sartre and Heidegger, all of which came to be formative in the development of his artistic style. During the summer of 1969, he photographed Woodstock, a series which was published in the New York Times 50th anniversary of the iconic music festival. Ballen notes that capturing Woodstock "played a role in [his] getting to know the human experience, human endeavour, finding the moment, working with people, searching in difficult circumstances for something that stood out. If I had to say what are important aspects that run through the work, it's trying to come to terms with pure chaos." Ballen made his first film Ill Wind after completing a course in film making in 1972.

After the death of his mother Adrienne in 1973, he, like many of the counter-culture, developed existential longing in responsive aversion to the materialism of Western society and his suburban upbringing. He spent the subsequent five months at the Art Students of League of New York. Here, he painted art brut, primitivist, paintings, that according to his teacher, "belonged in the Stone Age". In the autumn of 1973, yearning to find Conrad's "heart of darkness" and Eastern nirvana, he left on a five-year journey, that would take him by land from Cairo to Cape Town, and then Istanbul to New Guinea (1973-1978). On this trip, he continued an ongoing interest in taking pictures of enigmatic men against dramatic surfaces of shrines, temples and markets. He also began a series of 'field photographs' of streets, earthen paths or walls (inspired by the colour field painting movement) and developed an interest in observing the life of young boys. He kept Kodak Tri-X or Plus X film in a green canvas knapsack which he would tie to his legs during meals or overnight train rides, or tied to hotel bedposts. He processed the film and would send it to his father in New York.

On this trip, he arrived in South Africa, where he met his future wife, an artist, paper-maker and art teacher, Lynda Moross, whom he married in 1980, and had twins with in 1989. These travels also spurred on his first photographic book entitled Boyhood, which was a series of universal, iconic images of boys that Ballen had encountered while seeking to recreate his childhood in the adventure of travel. Disillusioned by the idea of commercial photography, Ballen enrolled at the Colorado School of Mines in 1978, where he received in PhD in mineral economics in 1981. He permanently settled in Johannesburg in 1982, where he worked as a self-employed mining entrepreneur until 2010. This profession took him into the South African countryside in which he travelled to remote small villages called "dorps" and rural areas referred to as the "platteland", in which he photographed the marginalized whites who were once privileged during Apartheid, but who were now isolated and economically deprived. During this time, he worked closely with his master printer and friend, Dennis da Silva. After 1994, he no longer looked to the countryside for his subject matter, finding it closer to home in Johannesburg, where he continues to work. Since 2007, he has worked closely with his art director, Marguerite Rossouw.

In 2018, Ballen received an honorary doctorate in art and design from Kingston University. In 2008, the Roger Ballen Foundation was founded to promote the advancement of education in photography in Africa. From April 2020, it will be housed in the Roger Ballen Centre for Photographic Art, Forest Town, Johannesburg.

== Ballenesque aesthetic ==
Ballen's early street photography and the psychological portraiture of Boyhood, Dorps and Platteland was influenced by the work of Cartier Bresson, Walker Evans, Diane Arbus and Elliot Erwitt. The distinctive "Ballenesque" style of his documentary fiction (from 2000 onward), has been said to reference the artistic genres of absurdist theatre, outsider art, art brut, naivism, photographic surrealism and the photographic grotesque. He has also said to have been influenced by a wide range of other literary artistic/philosophical work, such as that of Beckett, Kafka, Jung and Artaud.

Robert Young coins the term "Ballenesque" to refer to the unique qualities of Ballen's work that mark and identify it as his own. Young identifies four elements, that, in their "various shifting combinations and relations, together make up the constituent factors of the -esque factor." These include:

=== Prehensile portraits of the underprivileged ===
Although present as Ballen's work has evolved, the presence of the marginalized subject is a feature of much of the artist's earlier work. Ballen has emphasized his works do not have a sociopolitical agenda; they rather make a psychological and aesthetic statement . He has also stressed that these subjects are not anonymous; he has developed close friendships with them over the course of the history of working with them:

"For many of the people I have worked with over the years, the bond we established while working together, gave them a sense of purpose and meaning. On a typical day, I might receive twenty or thirty phone messages, some asking me when I am going to visit next, some making requests for food or medicine, and others reminding me that it is someone's birthday. In a single day, I can be a doctor, a lawyer, a priest and a social worker."

For Young, however, the distinctiveness of these photographs does not lie in the mere documenting of these "others", but rather, by the fact that these subjects are captured in such a way that they feel they "look back" at the spectator. Ballen's square format, shallow depth of field and space, confronts the viewer with a closeness to, and simultaneous inaccessibility of these people, who often seem to have "psychic disturbance". This remoteness is cultivated by the way in which they do not leave their often bizarre, domestic or theatrical, mysterious settings. For Young, that we cannot engage in empathy, sympathy or self-discovery; we merely submit to looking at their "transfixing gaze".

=== Windowless walls ===
This "remoteness" of the places of these inaccessible subjects is evoked because the spaces in which they appear are otherworldly—they exist in the realm of the photograph but do not seem to reference actual locations in everyday reality. Young writes: "there is no world that we can reference here." Ballen's use of black-and-white photography up until 2018, contributes powerfully to this transformation. He writes: "Black-and-white is a very minimalist art form and unlike color photographs does not pretend to mimic the world in a manner similar to the way the human eye might perceive. Black-and-white is essentially an abstract way to interpret and transform what one might refer to as reality."

Young further notes that the claustrophobic two-dimensional planes of the photograph itself are inscribed with drawings, marks and lines. From the early 90s onward, they appear in Ballen's photographs in wire (antenna lines electrical cords, twisted cable, baling wire, woven fence, coat hangers and snippets of anonymous strands). These mysterious closed rooms have been referred to by Ballen as "visual embodiments" of the 'place' of the subconscious mind, and as set in which people and animals present themselves and interact with objects and drawings; moments preserved by the stillness of the photograph.

He also emphasizes that these worlds are an artistic reality, in which there is a conversation and interaction of visual elements to create formal harmony. Ballen seems concise form and complex meaning in his images. He writes: "It's not so much a matter of content; it's also a matter of form. I am first and foremost a formalist. I always say that the form comes before the meaning. Before I think about the picture; before I think about pushing the button, I have to feel that the thing is an organic whole, that the forms integrate in some crucial way."

=== Recurring sets of "aleatory images" ===
One feature of the subconscious replicated in Ballen's psychological realms is the presence of the uncanny: the juxtaposition of incongruous, or unexpected, inexplicable elements to produce "new meanings that have yet to be formulated" and mimic the irrationality, free association and symbolic functioning of the unconscious mind. Didi Bozzini wrote that the relation between Ballen and his subjects disrupted the "laziness of our everyday gaze", thereby referring to the way in which his works subvert visual schemas, syntax or narratives.

Young writes that this coming together or "assemblage" of random elements as if by chance encounter can be deemed as "aleatory because it as if they have been put together by a throw of dice." They become absurdist because there is no context for their appearance or explanation of any relation between them, leaving them hanging in... a limbo of alienation". This anarchy in meaning is also extended to the way in which the natural order of things and social norms are subverted.

For these reasons, Rhodes employs Bakhtin's concepts of the "carnival" and the "carnivalesque" to enter the Ballenesque aesthetic, whether that be in his photography and film, or drawing and installation. Carnival is characterized by the idea of the world turned upside down, when socially established rules are reversed, and the natural order is loosened. As a result, it is also marked by an embrace of the grotesque and the absurd." Young links this to the chaos evoked by the way in which Ballen's photographs created a contiguity between natural and unnatural worlds, human, animal and inanimate objects, such that they are on the "same plane of being". He writes that "All things are precipitated into an empty, degraded limbo of waste, of refuse, or debris or decay, where they live together as equals but without any relation between them."

Ballen writes: "There's an aspect of the subconscious sense of things going out of control, being on the margin, not being able to control life in any real way. Things just fall apart. It is also enhanced by the decay and disintegration of things into the pervasive dirt. Dirt is an ever-presence in Ballen's work. As Warner Marien puts it: "Stains, infect surfaces, mildew climbs walls and artificial light accentuates soiled people and things. The indoor presence of animals like pigs, chickens and goats not only adds to the grime, it evokes physical and spiritual decay." This means that high-flown, abstract spirituality is incarnated in the earthly and material.

=== Dark junctures of disjunction ===
Together, these elements, cultivate worlds that no longer reside in the realm of the 'real', or veridical perceptual experiencing. In fact, Ballen's photography moves away from the traditional role of photography—to replicate or document the world we recognize. Instead, through his visual vocabulary and integration of elements, he moves into the realm of the abstract. Rhodes writes that is medium is "faithfully designed to represent visual reality, yet the realities he records are by turns absurd, transgressive, ethereal and uncanny.

== Works ==
Ballen's work can be segmented into several periods, each of which comprises published photographic series:

=== Documentary (1968–2000) ===
As a student at Berkeley, Ballen captured the civil rights movement and the Vietnam War. He photographed Woodstock in the summer of 1969, producing a series of photographs that were only published recently in the New York Times, on the 50th university of the revolutionary music festival. In his first publication, Boyhood (1979) Ballen presented a series of photographs of boys (chosen from 15000 images), shot during his four-year quest across the continents of Europe, Asia, Central and North America. The book captures archetypes of this universal brotherhood (from Nepal, to Indonesia, Israel to America): "their adventures, games, dreams and mischief."

In Dorps: Small Towns of South Africa (1986), Ballen documented the small towns and villages in unmodernised "hinterlands" of Apartheid South Africa, visited during his mineral exploration. The book contains weathered portraits of the corners, artifacts, trading stores, churches, main streets, signs, ornaments, people and interior dilapidated columns. Ballen has often stated that Dorps was his most important project in that he went "inside" metaphorically and physically, started using flash, found objects such as wires and walls. He also encountered the archetypes that he would develop over the course of his career. The project was explored in a 1986 programme by the South African Broadcasting Commission, with an episode entitled Dorps (1986).

The poor white came to the fore in Platteland: Images from Rural South Africa (1994). Here, Ballen presented tragic portraits of these people, who were facing political and economic anguish at the demise of an Apartheid system specifically designed to elevate them and guarantee government employment. As psychological studies of "character archetypes", the photographs were described by the photographic critic, Susan Sontag "the most impressive sequence of portraits [she'd] seen in years". The book also marked the beginning of Ballen's use of the middle format camera and flash, as well as the deliberate choice of a square negative and black-and-white film.The SouthBank Show aired an episode on the book in 1995 entitled, "Platteland".

=== Theatre of the absurd (2000–2008) ===
Ballen gained international acclaim from his next series Outland (2000), where these psychological studies moved from documentary photography into realms of fiction. The characters become actors who perform on elaborate stage sets, or dark or discomforting tableaux, with poses, masks and props. Graffiti and wires dangle haphazardly, and elements are more deliberately placed and formal elements structure the composition so as to enhance the allusion to "universal and metaphorical scenarios". Outland was named Best Photographic Book of the Year at PhotoEspaña 2001, Madrid, Spain and Ballen the Photographer of the Year at Rencontres d' Arles in 2002. An expanded edition of Outland, containing 30 previously unpublished pictures, was published in 2014. A film, entitled Roger Ballen's Outland, directed by Ben Jay Crossman, followed the book in 2015.

In Shadow Chamber (2005), Ballen's work made leaps into a metaphoric, surreal dimension with multiple conscious and subconscious meanings: "ambiguous images of people, animals and objects posed in mysterious, cell-like rooms. The images focus on the interactions between the people, animals and objects that inhabit mysterious rooms." A blurring between fact and fiction, and Young's notion "aleatory image", is created by the way in which the artifacts, scribbles, wires, dogs, rabbits, kittens and subjects that hide (in couches, shirts or boxes), interact in unexpected ways. As a consequence, this project ushered Ballen's surrealism, and the integration of documentary photography with art forms such as painting, theatre and sculpture, venturing into the realm of abstraction. As Sobieszek writes in his introduction to the book: "To discern fact from fiction in this work may be simply impossible; to tell acting from real life may also be; to bother with such discernment may not be only futile but missing the point." Saskia Vredeland directed the film Momento Mori (2005) as an accompaniment to the project, which was supported by the Netherlands Film Fund and screened at the Netherlands Film Festival in 2006.

Boarding House (2008) comprises over 70 black and white images. They are tableaux with a greater emphasis on drawn and sculptural elements, and a sense of collaboration between the artist and his subjects, although the subject starts to disappear. Ballen photographed his subjects at a house in a secret location on the outskirts of Johannesburg so that the images became greater metaphors for spaces in the mind. Ballen notes that, in photography, the "human face is an all-encompassing feature in trying to understand the meaning of the work. Thus, if there is no face in the image, the other elements in the photograph have less of a chance of being noticed." Young writes that "[i]n Boarding House, the perspectives and images become more two-dimensional, more avowedly pictorial though at the same time with greater violence. This is a private interior imaging the necropolis of a world outside that is only too intimate and real."

=== Psychological (2014–2016) ===
In Asylum of the Birds (2014), Ballen further explored his mysterious photographic spaces as refuges and prisons. In these worlds, people and animals live side by side, and there is an ever-presence of birds, who perform in the sculptural and decorated interior. In the images, "caged heads and birds are positioned against nightmarish, collage-like backgrounds, and mannequins and headless torsos assume contorted positions". A film, entitled Roger Ballen's Asylum of the Birds (2014), was made by Ben Jay Crossman. Ballen describes that the "house" in these photographs is a place of a landlord who allowed birds he collected to fly all over the house, cage-less. Ballen writes:

"The house is full of birds, ducks, chickens, pigeons, doves, whatever, different birds and they're all over the house, flying from one room to the next...[t]he people that live in the house are people from different aspects of the streets in South Africa—some people come from other places in Africa, some are unemployed, some are products of poverty, violence and anything else. I interacted with these birds and animals to create these photographs."

In The Theatre of the Apparitions (2016), inspired by the sight of hand-drawn carvings on blacked-out windows in an abandoned women's prison, Ballen (in conjunction with his artistic director Marguerite Rossouw) began to use different spray paints on glass and then 'drawing on' or removing the paint with a sharp object to let natural light through. These photographs resemble prehistoric cave paintings: the black, dimensionless spaces on glass. Fossil-like facial forms and dismembered body parts coexist uncomfortably with vaporous, ghost-like shadows. In an accompanying film animation, Roger Ballen's Theatre of the Apparitions (2016), Emma Calder and Ged Haney created an animated theatre of the book's dismembered people, beasts and ghosts, dance, tumble, make love and tear themselves apart a nightmarish subconscious world.

=== Collaborations and experimentation with other media (2014–2019) ===
In 2014, it was clear that after many years of creating photographic images, Ballen had developed a need to transcend what people refer to as pure photography. He became increasingly involved in video installations, collage, painting and other multimedia. From 2006 the co-leader of the South African rap group, Die Antwoord's Yolandi Visser, contacted Ballen proposing a collaboration. In 2011, he directed the music video for the song "I Fink U Freeky" by Die Antwoord which has been viewed 150 million times on YouTube. Roger Ballen - Die Antwoord: I Fink U Freeky (2013) was a book collaboration with Die Antwoord, with group's leaders, Yolandi and Ninja, as the photographic subjects.

After completing Asylum of the Birds in 2013, Roger Ballen began his last series of black and white negative-based imagery in which Rats dominated every image. The unpublished project, which was completed in 2017 once again integrated drawing, painting, sculpture through the camera and eye of the artist. The results reveal a world immersed in chaos, absurdity and dreamlike reality. In 2020, he will complete a photographic and video project of a person dressed as a cartoon rat in which this character is involved in activities that might be seen as politically and socially absurd.

In 2015, Ballen created a conceptual installation artwork in Finland's Serlachius Museum in Mantta. He transformed a dilapidated house in the Finish forest into a complete sculptural entity that was installed in the museum's new pavilion. The work coincided with a new publication, The House Project (2015) with long-time collaborator, writer Didi Bozzini. It moved away from a historical exposition of Ballen's work in favour of a psychological one, evoking possible literary and philosophical references in his work. Ballen has subsequently built installations all over the world, for example in the Istanbul Museum of Art (2016), Galleria Massimo Minini 2016, Brescia, Italy; 2017, Les Rencontres Arles (2017), Zeitz Mocaa, Cape Town (2017), City Passage, No Exit Revisited (2018) Wiesbaden; Museo de Fotografia, 2018, Fortaleza, Brazil.

Ballen's collaboration with Comme des Garçons featured at Paris Fashion Week saw his artwork on the brand's Homme Plus A/W 2015 range, where his images were etched onto the back of white coats for their Fall 2015 collection. In No Joke (2013), Ballen and Rossouw collaborated with Asger Carlson to create photo-sculpted figures, swapped self-portraits, substituted and reassigned body parts, oddly occupied architecture, cut and collaged hand-drawn masks and graffiti, as well as spiders, foxes, angels, demons and dolls in an imaginary dream-like set on which an elusive narrative unfolds. In Unleashed (2017), Ballen and Rossouw worked together with artist and sculpture, Hans Lemmen to create images that integrate Lemmen's figurative drawings (that reference natural history, archaeology, paleontology, mythological proto-civilization) with Ballen's theatrical depictions of the subconscious.

In 2018, Ballen released his first series of colour photographs after Leica gave him a colour camera with which to experiment with. A series of colour polaroids was first shown at a booth of Reflex Gallery at Unseen Photo Fair, and 150 of them published in a book by the gallery and van Sniderden, entitled Roger Ballen: Polaroids - Volume One (2017).

In September 2019, Ballen opened his largest show yet at HalleSaint Pierre in Paris titled The World According to Roger Ballen, in which he exhibited numerous installations, drawings, videos, and photographs

=== Roger the Rat (2015-2020) ===
Ballen created the Roger the Rat series in Johannesburg between 2015 and 2020. In this series, the artist documents a part-human, part-animal rat creature who lives an isolated life outside of mainstream society. The rodent protagonist of these black-and-white photos engages in devious behaviours that are both humorous and sinister; relinquishes morality to live a life "unconstrained by societal norms." The rat dances and drinks with mannequin friends, participates in lewd or sexually perverse acts engages in acts of torture, beheading or dismemberment (kills catfish in a bath, ties and locks up mannequins in a narrow cupboard, feeds another rat to snake and holds a head on a butcher block).

Roger the Rat's set—his surroundings and companions—have distinctly "Ballenesque" elements such as bare walls, filthy bedding, mannequins, chains, chalk drawings and abundant rats. In evoking discomfort through transgressive and mischievous acts, these photographs are intended to disturb and unleash the deeper, repressed parts of the psyche. As Roger the Rat writes in the introduction to the book:

"Most people hate people such as me, as we challenge their illusion of stability and purpose. As I rat, I symbolize chaos and disorder. There is little hope for a better world until humanity comes to terms with the unpleasant fact that repression and fear are the masters of their destiny."

Some have even deemed Roger the Rat as an eponym of the artist; more specifically, of his unconscious. However, the artist has explained the symbolism of rats in general:

"The rat has always been thought of as something that carries disease -- something that's dirty, and that should be avoided. In a way, it's seen as an archetype of evil. But it is, ultimately, just a part of nature: it's not good or bad, it's just out there doing whatever it's programmed by nature to do… The second thing is that rats are super intelligent. If you were to weigh a rat's brain, in relationship to, an equal sized animal brain, the rat's intelligence would be much greater…You find them in any climate or context -- in the Arctic, in the tropics, in garbage dumps, in the wild -- and they breed and they breed and they breed. It's an animal that's super adaptable, that exists all over the world, and yet, in the Western World at least, is seen as a sign of evil and chaos. It's interesting how we project these value judgments onto them. Their intelligence is often perceived as malicious. That's a sign of our repression. Western culture prefers things shiny, new, innovated. It likes to have an optimistic, repressed view of life. It clings to Hollywood films because they always end in a positive way. The rat, for whatever historical reasons, has come to symbolise the diametric opposite to that. The rat symbolizes subconscious repression."

In 2020, one week before the coronavirus lockdown in South Africa, Ballen completed a 25-minute film featuring Roger with the mime-actor, Daniel Buckland, portraying Roger the Rat. Directed by Justin Elgie with cinematography by Paul Gilpin, the film adds an extra dimension to the character of Roger by placing him in a medium with the capacity to reach a wider audience. Various sounds – including trains, road traffic and rats' squeaks – pervade the hovel in which Roger lives. One experiences his love–hate relationships with the mannequins and other rats he invites into his dwelling.

=== Move to colour (2017-) ===
At the end of 2016, Ballen contacted Leica to obtain a camera for a film he was to make on his Thames and Hudson publication, Roger Ballen: A Retrospective, which was to be published shortly thereafter. Whilst making the film using the Leica SL (with 35-90mm) zoom lens, Ballen experimented with taking some still shots in colour.

The palette remained muted and monochromatic: in the artist's words, his photography had become "black-and-white in colour". This shift also facilitated a more creative exploration of lighting and enhanced the ambiguity of the real and fictional, both of which contributed to a greater complexity of the photographs. Ballen writes: "The move to colour was unexpected, to say the least. It could be compared to an earthquake, when layers of rock that used to be side by side suddenly find themselves in some other place."

=== Lockdown drawings (2020) ===
Ballen began drawing on canvas during the first South African Covid lockdown of March 2020. This was the first time that he engaged in this kind of activity since 1973, when following his mother's death, he painted for a period of five months. Ballen notes that the drawings in his photographs can be traced back to this early period of artistic exploration in his 20s. A few days before the lockdown, Ballen realised that the only creative activity he could pursue during this time, would be drawing. His wife, artist Lynda Ballen, helped him to acquire a 50-metre-long roll of canvas and Rembrandt colour pastels. Since construction of the Inside Out Centre for the Arts was halted due to the pandemic, Ballen set up an ad hoc painting studio in this used unfinished, empty building, and worked there for two months in isolation. During the first eight weeks of lockdown, he worked solely on canvas, and then began working on board, which enhanced the saturation of the pastel. Ballen's thirty-five drawings from this time, reflect the themes and imagery of the pandemic, as he writes:

"Ghostlike figures, predatory beasts, viruses and sickly figures reflected a world of fear, chaos and uncertainty. The most primitive form of life was on the verge of destroying the scientific and technological certainties on which modern consumer life is based. Inside the primeval parts of our brain, there exists an archetypal fear of the kind of disease that has the capacity to kill its host. The Covid-19 virus had triggered this fear; it had awakened it at the expense of all our other concerns. It might be generations before humans are able to come to terms with such deep-seated fears."

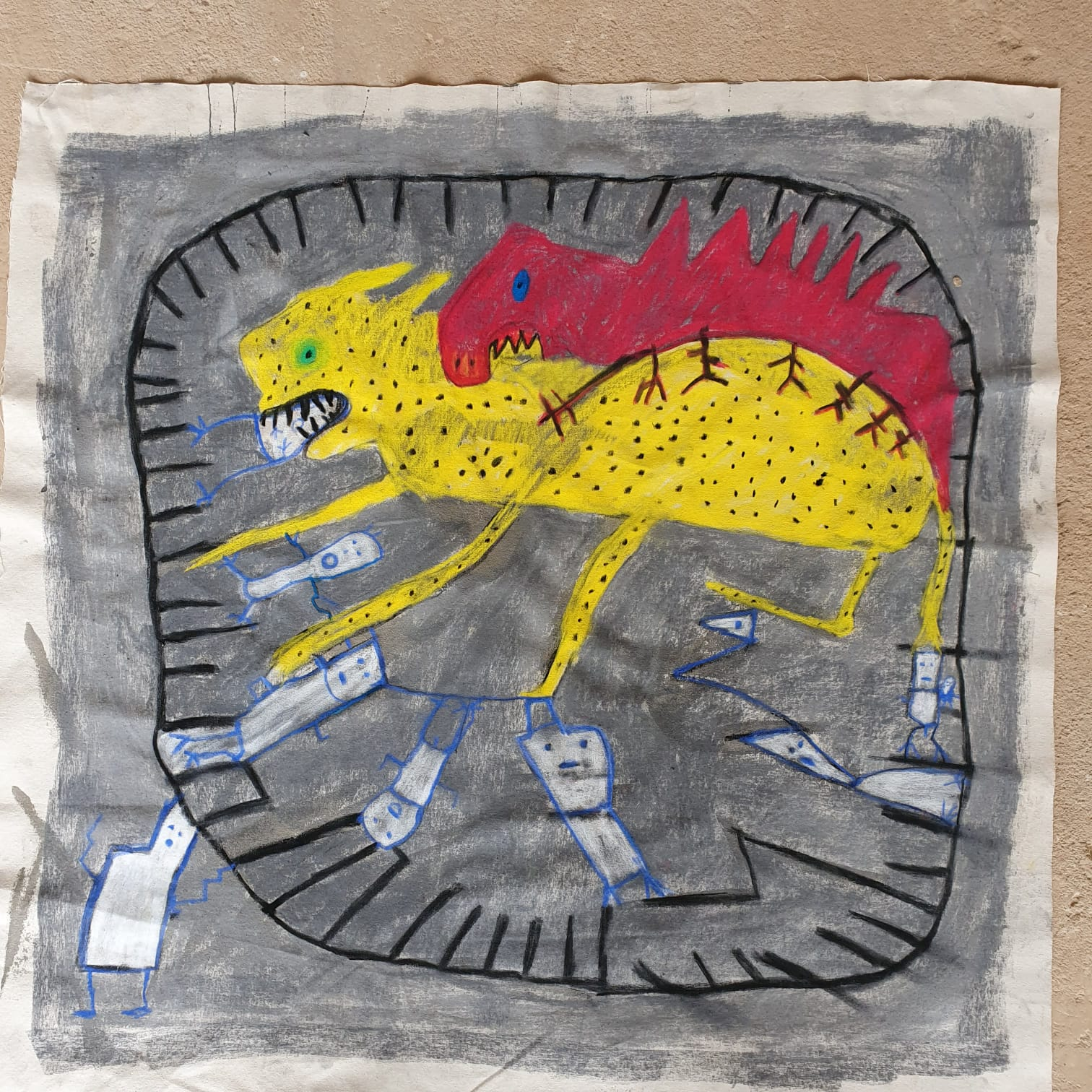
One of Roger Ballen's Lockdown Drawings in Progress (March 2020)

== Inside Out Centre for the Arts ==
Ballen founded the Inside Out Centre for the Arts in 2018. He created the centre to exhibit, educate and promote art related to the African continent. It aims to provide a powerful multimedia experience, using photography, videos, installation, drawing and painting, and will open to the public in mid 2022.

In 2018, a site became available in Forest Town, Johannesburg for the construction of the Inside Out Centre building. Ballen commissioned Joe Van Rooyen of JVR Architects to design a multifunctional structure. The design incorporates an office or administrative area, printing area, Ballen's archive, as well as exhibition spaces for a range of artistic practices, including photography, installation, sculpture, drawing, painting and film. The property is situated on the major artery of Jan Smuts (48 Jan Smuts Ave) in Forest Town. It forms part of a trio of cultural centres, joining The Johannesburg Contemporary Arts Foundation and The Johannesburg Holocaust and Genocide Centre, which gives the suburban area a clear public character.

Ballen's photographs and other artworks take the viewer on a journey into the deeper, elusive recesses of the psyche. This process of internal, psychological discovery– in which repressed or concealed material is brought to the forefront of consciousness when looking at the artwork– is captured in the name "Inside Out Centre ''.This aesthetic ideology is also translated into all aspects of this landmark's design. From the road, an undulating fence draws in the eyes of passersby. The edifice appears as a mysterious block; a curved ramp leads the visitor into a concealed entrance. Exterior and interior concrete surfaces are almost indistinguishable. What is inside and outside becomes ambiguous, or even blurred: the insides of the building are literally turned 'out'.

Within the walls, a dramatically cantilevered room (suspended over this sunken courtyard on the left), houses the main office and administrative functions. The main exhibition space is dominated by a suspended barrel hanging in the double-volume space. This heeds to the abstraction of the artist's work.

Further, the building appropriately draws inspiration from the Brutalist movement of the 1950s. In a similar vein to Ballen's works, this architectural movement aimed to confront the viewer to the 'raw' by exposing sculptural elements or bare building materials. The strong geometry and béton brut (raw concrete) filter soft light into the space. These cast patterns of sun and shadow throughout the day evoke the camera's aperture, which opens and closes to let in various degrees of light which affect the appearance of the photograph. It also illuminates the space with indirect light that protects the artworks from bleaching or destruction from harsh, direct light. Ballen was also influenced by simplicity, weightlessness and complex circulation of the Japanese architect Tadao Ando's The Tokyo Art Museum.

The exterior of the building, stippled in Tyrolean plasterwork, harks back to the Arts and Crafts Movement and pays homage to many of the heritage houses established in the area. The building is set low, and the mass is broken down into ordered parts, to respect the current fabric of the area. Horizontal windows line is the walkway that bridges the entrance with the office area and frames significant scenes of the historic suburb of Parktown (such as the famous white spires of the Johannesburg South Africa Temple). On the other side, enlarged windows on the front of the building look onto a grand jacaranda tree; a pond that brims with bamboo, black water lilies that appear as iron sculptures and vegetation of Westcliff ridge. Alongside Parktown, this area was the home to the city's colonial randlords and mining magnates as early as the 1890s.

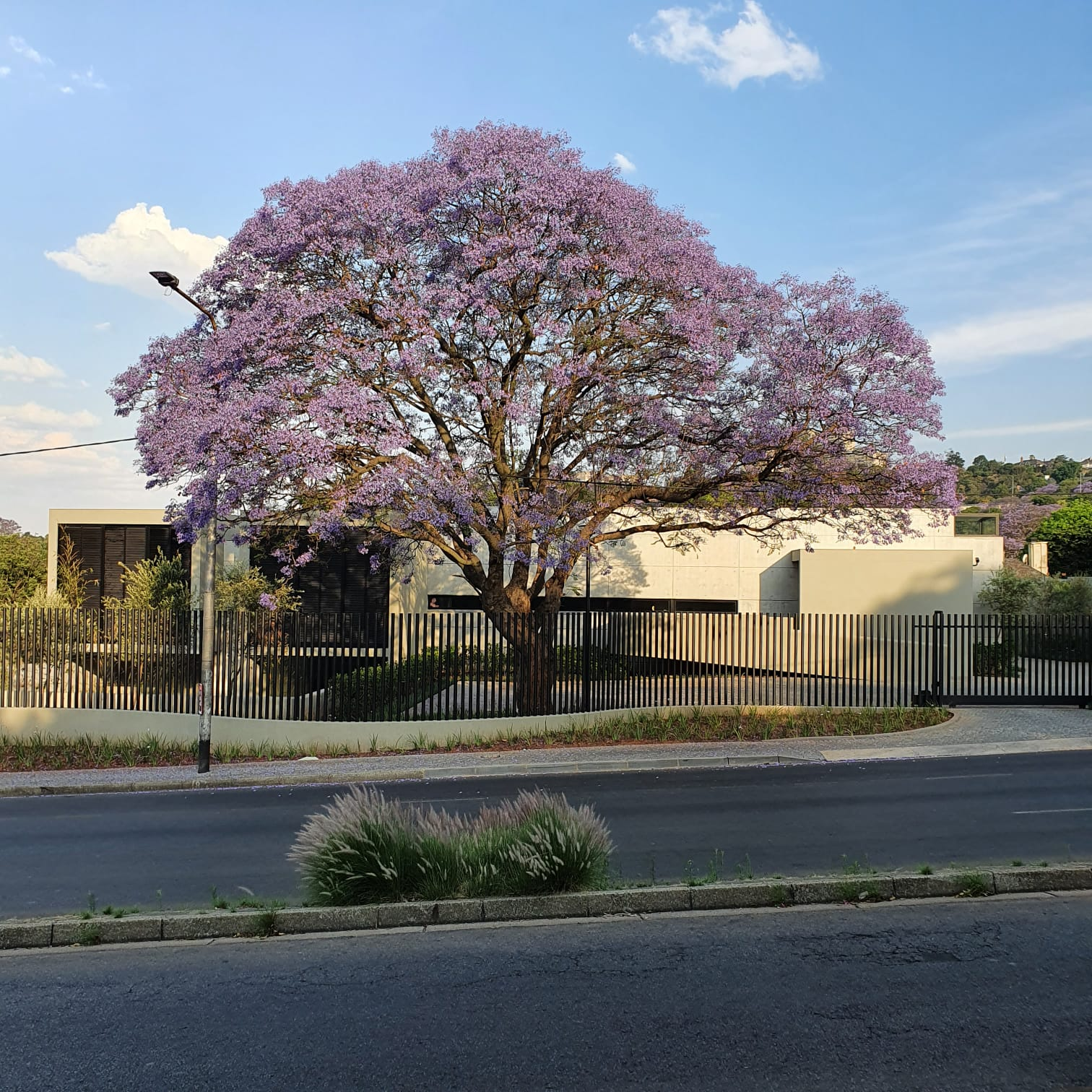
Inside Out Centre for the Arts from Westcliff Ridge

== Publications ==
=== Publications by Ballen ===
- Boyhood. New York: Chelsea House Publishers, 1979. ISBN 0877540918.
- Dorps: Small Towns of South Africa. Cape Town: Hirt and Carter, 1986. Reprinted by Protea Boekhuis, 2011. ISBN 978-0704370876
- Platteland. London: Quartet, 1994; New York: St. Martin's, 1996. ISBN 9780704370876
- Cette Afrique là. Photo Poche series. Paris: Nathan, 1997. ISBN 9782097542670
- Outland. London: Phaidon, 2001. ISBN 978-0714840581
  - Expanded edition. Phaidon, 2015. ISBN 978-0714868844
- Fact or Fiction. Paris: Kamel Mennour, 2003. ISBN 291417109-9.
- Shadow Chamber. London: Phaidon, 2005. ISBN 978-0714844664
- Boarding House. London: Phaidon, 2009. ISBN 9780714849522
- Animal Abstraction. Exhibition catalogue Galerie Alex Daniels, Amsterdam: Reflex, 2011. ISBN 9789071848001
- Roger Ballen. Photo Poche series. Paris: Nathan, 2012. ISBN 978-2330006952
- I Fink U Freeky. Random House Prestel, 2013. ISBN 978-3791348605
- Asylum of the Birds. London: Thames & Hudson, 2014. ISBN 9780500544297. With an introduction by Didi Bozzini.
- The House Project. Oodee, 2015. ISBN 9780957038974. Edition of 1000 copies.
- The Rome Ballen Times. Rome: Punctum. Edition of 200 copies. ISBN 9780957038974
- Ballenesque: Roger Ballen, A Retrospective. London: Thames and Hudson, 2017. ISBN 978-0500519691
- The World According to Roger Ballen. London, Thames and Hudson, 2020. ISBN 9780500545218
- Roger Ballen: Spirits and Spaces, London, Thames and Hudson, 2025. ISBN 9780500028926

=== Publication paired with another ===
- No Joke. London: Morel, 2016. With Asger Carlsen. ISBN 978-1-907071-56-0. Edition of 1000 copies.
- Unleashed, Bielfeld: Kerber, 2017 with Hans Lemmen. Editor: Jan-Philipp Fruehsorge. ISBN 978-3-7356-0356-2
- The Earth Will Come To Laugh and Feast, New York: powerHouse Books, 2020 with Gabriele Tinti. ISBN 978-1576879481
- Hungry Ghosts, New York: Eris Press, 2025 with Gabriele Tinti. ISBN 978-1916809741

== Collections ==
Ballen's work is held in the following permanent collections:

- Galería la Aurora, Murcia, Spain
- Museum of Modern Art, New York: 1 print (as of February 2020)
- Stedelijk Museum, Amsterdam, Netherlands

== Exhibitions ==
Ballen's work has been exhibited at the following museums:

- 2014: Roger Ballen's Theater of the Absurd, Fotografiska Stockholm, Sweden.
- 2020: Roger Ballen in Color, Camera Obsura, Spain.
- 2023:The World According to Roger Ballen, Fotografiska Tallinn, Estonia
- 2025: The World According to Roger Ballen, Vestfossen Kunstlaboratorium, Oslo, Norway.

== Awards ==
- Best Photographic Book of the Year, PHotoEspaña, Spain, 2001
- Photographer of the Year, Rencontres d'Arles, 2002
- Finalist, Citigroup Photography Prize (now Deutsche Börse Photography Foundation Prize), UK, 2002
- Finalist, Lucie Awards Curator/Exhibition of the Year: Roger Ballen: Photographs 1982 – 2009. Curated by Dr. Anthony Bannon for the George Eastman House, Rochester, New York.
- Best music video, I Fink U Freeky, 20th Short Vila do Conde International Film Festival, Portugal, 2012
- Best Music Video, I Fink U Freeky, Plus Camerimage International Film Festival of the Art of Cinematography, Bydgoszcz, Poland
- Honorary Doctor of Art and Design, Kingston University, UK, 2018
