= Poulomi Basu =

Indian artist and photographer

- Born: 1983 (age 42–43); Kolkata, India
- Education: London College of Communication
- Occupations: Contemporary artist Filmmaker; Author
- Awards: BAFTA Breakthrough (2024)
- Website: poulomibasu.com

Poulomi Basu is an Indian-British transnational contemporary artist and filmmaker. Her cross-medium practice spans contemporary photography, film, immersive virtual and mixed reality, new media art, gaming, poetry and multi-sensory installations. Her docufiction draws together speculative fiction, autofiction and "South Asian Futurism"—described as a decolonial approach to science fiction—to confront the entanglements of systemic, ecological and personal violence, and questions of human rights, grounded in grassroots advocacy.

Basu's honours include the Royal Photographic Society's Hood Medal for Blood Speaks, a fellowship at the Sundance Institute's New Frontier Story Lab (2017), a shortlisting for the Deutsche Börse Photography Foundation Prize (2021) for Centralia, and the inaugural International Center of Photography Infinity Award for Contemporary Photography and New Media (2023). Her immersive film Maya: The Birth of a Superhero was one of eight works nominated for the inaugural Immersive Competition at the 2024 Cannes Film Festival, and in 2024 she was named a BAFTA Breakthrough UK artist. In 2025–26 she had two solo shows: Always Coming Home at the Focal Point Gallery in Southend-on-Sea, United Kingdom, and Phantasmagoria at Fotomuseum Winterthur in Switzerland, her first solo museum exhibition.

Art critic Charlotte Jansen wrote in Tate's publication, Fifty Pioneers Defining Photography for the Twenty-First Century, that Basu's work is "beautiful but also apocalyptic, her photographs and films pulsate with psychotropic light".

== Early life ==
Basu was born and raised in Kolkata, India. She has said "I grew up in a home with all kinds of taboos, and it was an extremely violent, patriarchal and misogynistic environment. I saw how these things were related and became interested in exploring the complex web of patriarchy." She majored in sociology then did a master's degree in photojournalism and documentary photography at the London College of Communication.

== Work ==
Basu's work often addresses the normalisation of violence against marginalised women. the BBC described Basu as a "visual activist known for her fearless examination of systemic injustices. Her lens focuses on stories that often go ignored or underreported, particularly those of women in isolated communities and conflict zones."

Basu was at the center of a major controversy with her story on menstruation in Nepal with an Editor's footnote about manipulation of subject for creating more engaging visuals

Her To Conquer Her Land series depicts the first female soldiers in the Indian Army, on the India–Pakistan border. In Basu's words, "To Conquer Her Land is about new forms of stress – related to combatant life – that has never existed for Indian women before in history." Her work deals with sensitive issues of self image and focuses on women who are striving to redefine their identity. Basu's work pivots around the "intricate issues of conflict, psychological warfare, class, youth, gender, love, peace, the concept of home, an undefined idea of patriotism, and the strength of the mind." To Conquer Her Land is a fitting title as this work is dedicated to the women who are trying to claim their place not only in the military but also in the eyes of society where gender norms are still harsh towards women.

Blood Speaks: A Ritual of Exile deals with the Nepalese practice of Chhaupadi, which

dictates that women who are menstruating, and those who experience bleeding after childbirth, must live in makeshift huts because they are considered impure and therefore untouchable. Exiled by their communities and families, the women are refused access to water and toilets and must eat food scraps, fed to them as though they were animals.

Basu made the work in Surkhet District, in a remote region of Nepal, in 2013, 2014 and 2016. When exhibited, the work includes two screen projections, photographs shown in LED-powered light boxes, a surround-soundscape and an immersive virtual reality installation—"The room deliberately evokes the oppressive environment inhabited by the women". Tate Modern curator, Emma Lewis, speaks of Basu's work saying that

Blood Speaks highlighted the grave consequences of normalized violence and how such taboos negatively impact sustainability goals relating to child marriage, attitudes to reproductive health, maternal mortality and school education. The project resulted in Basu collaborating with several charities, including WaterAid for their 'To Be A Girl' campaign. In 2018, the Nepalese government passed a new law enforcing existing legislation around chhaupadi with a jail sentence and fine.

Centralia focuses on the female guerrillas of the Naxalite–Maoist insurgency. Sean O'Hagan wrote in The Guardian that the book "casts light on an overlooked conflict between the Indian state and the Maoist People's Liberation Guerrilla Army, which is made up of volunteers from a beleaguered indigenous community. Basu moves effortlessly between traditional documentary and a heightened, almost hallucinatory approach that reflects both the brutality of the conflict and the state propaganda that feeds on half-truths and manipulated "facts"." Basu takes cues from "the literary work of William Faulkner, J G Ballard and Arundhati Roy, as well as the dream narratives of David Lynch" ... "in composing Centralia, which is set largely in the state of Chhattisgarh, as well as the states of Odisha, West Bengal and Jharkhand". Her reason for taking inspiration from these notable figures, in her words, is because "they deal with the darkness that lies ahead." She reflects, "in a way, this project is a prism to explore contemporary India through my own connection to a historical and present series of events.

Fireflies is a multi-layered body of work including photography, moving image, and performance. Fireflies covers many complex narratives around eco-feminism and gender justice, with grounded ideas of magical realism and science fiction. Alona Pardo, curator of The Barbican, introduces Basu's work: "Fireflies, consists of a series of deeply emotive and powerful images of Poulomi invariably performing for the camera". The project consists of images that Basu intertwined with her mother, underscoring a matrilineal heritage and genealogy that speaks to the violence which is all too often bestowed on women's bodies, highlighting female oppression and the hetero-patriarchal cultural values that are also a shared trauma, and notions of care. Kenneth Dickerman wrote in The Washington Post that "Basu's work seeks to turn that paradigm on its head to begin to create a more equitable, favorable and stable world for all". Shyama Laxman wrote in Aesthetica Magazine that

despite the hard-hitting subject matter, Fireflies is not unsettling, rather, mesmerising. Whilst bruises and blood are subtly weaved into the show, these pockets of brutality are offset by a pervading sense of hope that women will break the cycle of abuse and forge a better world for themselves.

== Other activities ==
Basu is a co-founder/director of Just Another Photo Festival, begun in 2015, which seeks to democratise access to visual media. She is a visiting lecturer at University of the Arts London's Visible Justice and collaborative Unit.

== Publications ==
=== Books of work by Basu ===
- Centralia. Stockport: Dewi Lewis, 2020. ISBN 978-1-911306-57-3.

=== Publications with contributions by Basu ===
- Hungry Still. Quad/Format/Slideluck, 2014. ISBN 978-0955353888.
- A Time To See. Queen Elizabeth Diamond Jubilee Trust/Impress, 2016. ISBN 978-0995554009.
- Firecrackers: Female Photographers Now. London: Thames & Hudson, 2017. By Fiona Rogers and Max Houghton. ISBN 978-0500544747.
- Photography Now: Fifty Pioneers Defining 21st Century Photography. Tate/Ilex, 2021. By Charlotte Jansen. ISBN 978-1781576205.
- Photography – A Feminist History. Tate, 2021. By Emma Lewis. ISBN 978-1781578049.

== Films ==
- Maya: The Birth of a Super Hero - Winner, Viborg Animation Festival, Anidox:VR Award for Best Animated Documentary, 2024
- Maya: The Birth of a Super Hero - Sélection Officelle, Compétition Immersive, Festival De Cannes, 2024
- Maya: The Birth of a Super Hero - Grand Jury Award, SXSW Film Festival, 2024
- Blood Speaks - Inter:Active award in competition, CPH:DOX, 2024
- Maya: The Birth of a Super Hero - Special Jury Mention Award, Tribeca Film Festival, 2023
- Maya: The Birth of a Super Hero – official selection, Venice Production Bridge, 78th Venice International Film Festival, 2021; UN Women, Games for Change, UN HQ, New York, 2023
- Fireflies
- Blood Speaks – released by Tribeca Film Institute, Kathmandu International Mountain Film Festival (KIMFF), Nepal, 2018; Margaret Mead Film Festival, American Natural History Museum, New York, USA, October 2018; SXSW, 2019

== Collections ==
- Victoria and Albert Museum, London, Centralia.
- The Museum of Modern Art (MoMA), New York, Special Collections; Centralia book.

== Exhibitions ==
- A Ritual of Exile: Blood Speaks, Pearson Building, Format Festival, Derby, UK, 2017
- Centralia, Photoworks Festival, Brighton, UK, 2020.
- Deutsche Börse Photography Foundation Prize 2021, The Photographers' Gallery, London, 2021
- Eruptions: a decade of creation, Side Gallery, Newcastle, UK, 2021–22. An immersive installation of VR, film and photographic work from 2009 to 2021. Includes Blood Speaks: A Ritual of Exile, Centralia and To Conquer Her Land.
- Fireflies, Autograph ABP, London, 2022.

== Awards ==
- 2012: Winner, 2nd place, Foto Visura Grant for To Conquer Her Land
- 2012: Magnum Foundation Social Justice Fellowship
- 2016: Winner, Magnum Emergency Fund, Magnum Foundation, to continue making A Ritual of Exile: Blood Speaks
- 2016: Winner, Magnum Foundation Human Rights Grant, What Works
- 2017: Winner, FotoEvidence Book Award, New York City, for A Ritual of Exile: Blood Speaks
- 2020: Hood Medal, Royal Photographic Society, Bristol, UK for Blood Speaks
- 2020: Louis Roederer Discovery Award, Rencontres d'Arles, Arles, France
- 2020: Winner, Rencontres d'Arles Louis Roederer Discovery Award Jury Prize for Centralia
- 2020: Singapore International Photography Festival Book Awards for Centralia
- 2020: Winner, CreativeXR programme by Digital Catapult and Arts Council England for Blood Speaks: Maya – The Birth of a Superhero
- 2021: Shortlisted, Deutsche Börse Photography Foundation Prize, London for Centralia; along with Alejandro Cartagena, Cao Fei, and Zineb Sedira
- 2021: Shortlisted, Kraszna-Krausz Book Awards for Centralia, UK
- 2022: Winner, Best Experimental Film, BAFTA qualifying, Aesthetica Short Film Festival, UK, for the film Fireflies
- 2023: International Center of Photography Infinity Award for outstanding contribution to Contemporary Photography and New Media
- 2023: Special Jury Mention Award, New Voices Immersive Competition, Tribeca Festival, USA, for the film Maya: The Birth of a Super Hero
- 2024: BAFTA Breakthrough 2024, for the film Maya: The Birth of a Super Hero.
