= Zineb Sedira =

Algerian photographer, artist (born 1963)

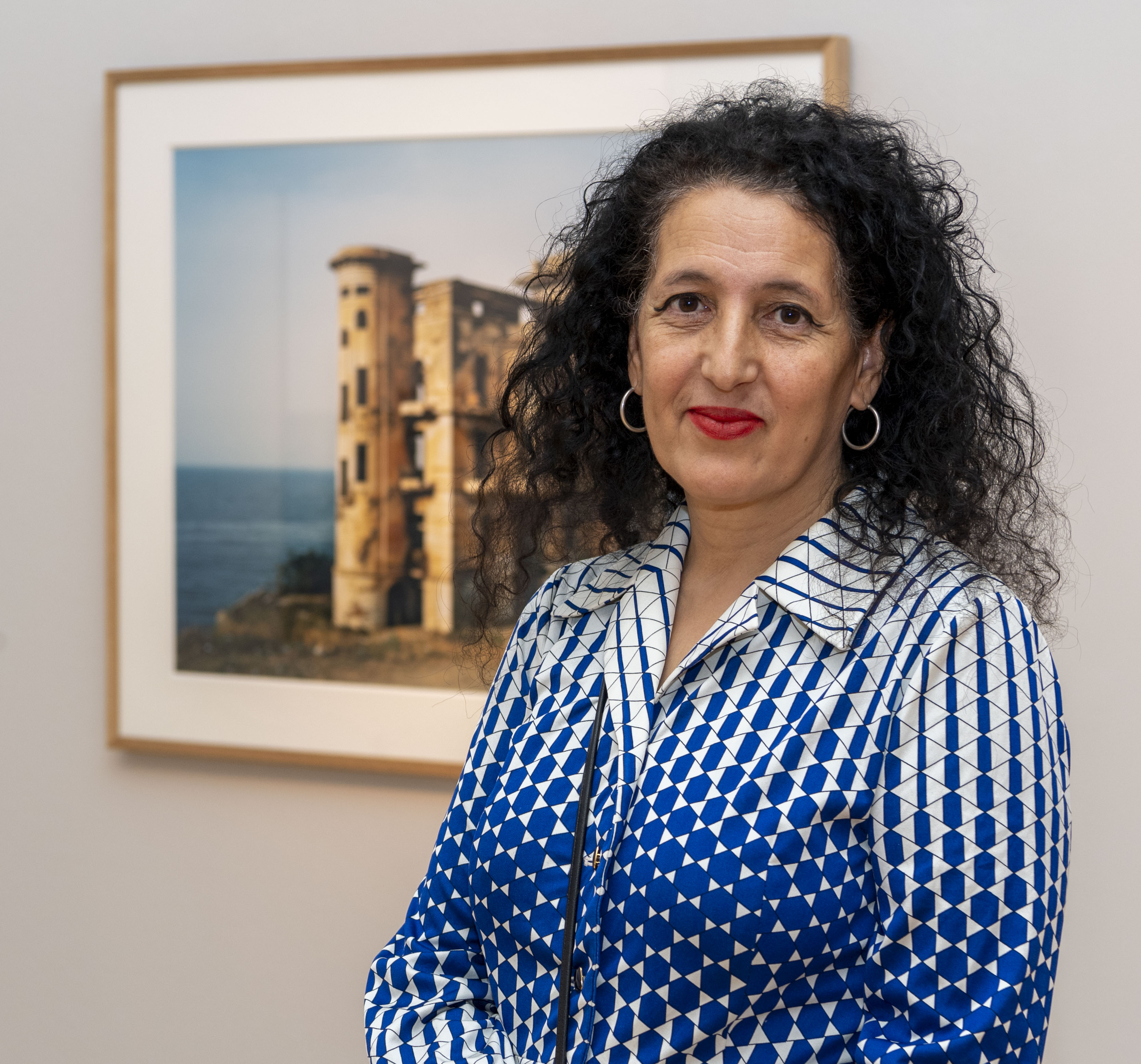
- Born: April 1, 1963 (age 62); Paris, France
- Education: Central Saint Martins; Slade School of Fine Art; Royal College of Art
- Known for: Photography and video
- Movement: Modernism
- Website: zinebsedira.com

Zineb Sedira (born April 1, 1963) is a London-based Franco-Algerian feminist photographer and video artist, best known for work exploring the human relationship to geography.

Sedira was shortlisted for the 2021 Deutsche Börse Photography Foundation Prize.

== Early life and education ==
Zineb Sedira was born on April 1, 1963, to Abdul Rahman Sedira and Oumessaad Rouabah, immigrants from Algeria, in the Parisian suburb of Gennevilliers. She moved to England in 1986.

Sedira received a BA in Critical Fine Art Practice at London's Central Saint Martins, then earned an MFA from the Slade School of Fine Art in 1997. She later spent five years doing research at the Royal College of Art.

== Career ==
Sedira's early work focused on images of women in the Muslim world, featuring photographs of her mother and her daughter. Watching her mother don the haik upon arrival in Algiers had a significant impact on Sedira. "I remember as soon as we got off the plane and arrived at her home, she would open the case and put it out," she said in 2013. "She would change into it. She would become it." Her video, Mother Tongue (2002) shows herself, her daughter, and her mother speaking in their "mother tongues", French, English, and Arabic respectively, with Sedira acting as the linguistic conduit between her mother and her daughter who don't have a language in common. In September 2020 it was announced that Sedira will represent France at the 59th Venice Biennale, in 2022. She created an installation named “dreams have no titles” where she converted the French pavilion into a film studio and a screening room paying tribute to the 1960s and 1970s militant films and referencing also to her own family’s history as immigrants in France.

== Exhibitions ==
- 2004: Zineb Sedira: Telling stories with differences, Cornerhouse, Manchester, UK
- 2005: British Art Show 06, opening at Baltic, Gateshead, touring to Manchester, Nottingham and Bristol.
- 2006: Saphir, The Photographers' Gallery, London
- 2007: Saphir, Temble Bar Gallery, Dublin, Ireland
- 2007: Videos by Zineb Sedira, Centre d'Art Contemporain du Parvis, Pau, France
- 2008: MiddleSea, The Wapping Project, London
- 2009: Floating Coffins, New Art Exchange, Nottingham, UK
- 2009: Zineb Sedira: Seafaring, John Hansard Gallery, Southampton, UK
- 2009: Under the Sky and Over the Sea, Pori Art Museum, Finland
- 2010: Zineb Sedira, Musée Picasso (Vallauris), La Guerre et la Paix, Vallauris, France
- 2010: Gardiennes d'images, Palais de Tokyo, Paris
- 2011: Beneath the Surface, Galerie Kamel Mennour, Paris
- 2013: The Voyage, or Three Years at Sea Part V: Zineb Sedira, Charles H. Scott Gallery, Vancouver, Canada
- 2016: Collecting Lines, Art on the Underground, London
- 2018: Of Words and Stones, curated by Marie Muracciole at the Beirut Art Center, Lebanon
- 2018: Zineb Sedira: Air Affairs and Maritime Nonsense, Sharjah Art Museum, Sharjah, United Arab Emirates. A retrospective.

== Collections ==
Sedira's work is held in the following public collections:

- Arts Council Collection, UK: 1 print (as of July 2021)
- Centre Pompidou, Musée national d'art moderne, Paris: 7 prints (as of July 2021)
- Musée national de l'histoire et des cultures de l'immigration / Cité nationale de l'histoire, Paris: 1 video installation, "Mother Tongue" (as of July 2021)
- Sharjah Art Museum, Sharjah, United Arab Emirates
- Tate, London: 2 works (as of July 2021)
- Mumok, Museumsquartier, Vienna: 1 work, "The House of the Mother (Algeria)" (as of July 2021)
- Victoria and Albert Museum, Contemporary Wall Paper Collections, London: 1 work, "Une Generation des Femmes" (as of July 2021)
- Whitworth Art Gallery, Contemporary Wall Paper Collections, Manchester: 1 work, "Une Generation des Femmes" (as of July 2021)

== Awards ==
- 1999 Artsadmin Artists Bursary, London & Artists film and video national fund, The Arts Council of England
- 2000 Westminster Arts Council, Film and Video Bursaries, London
- 2001 Prix AfAA, Laureat 2001: IV Rencontres de la photographie africaine, Bamako 2001, Mali
- 2004 Decibel Award, Arts Council, London
- 2009: SAM Art Prize, Paris
- 2021: Shortlisted, Deutsche Börse Photography Foundation Prize, London for the exhibition Standing Here Wondering Which Way to Go at Jeu de Paume, Paris in 2019; along with Poulomi Basu, Alejandro Cartagena and Cao Fei
