= Donovan Wylie =

Northern Irish photographer (born 1971)

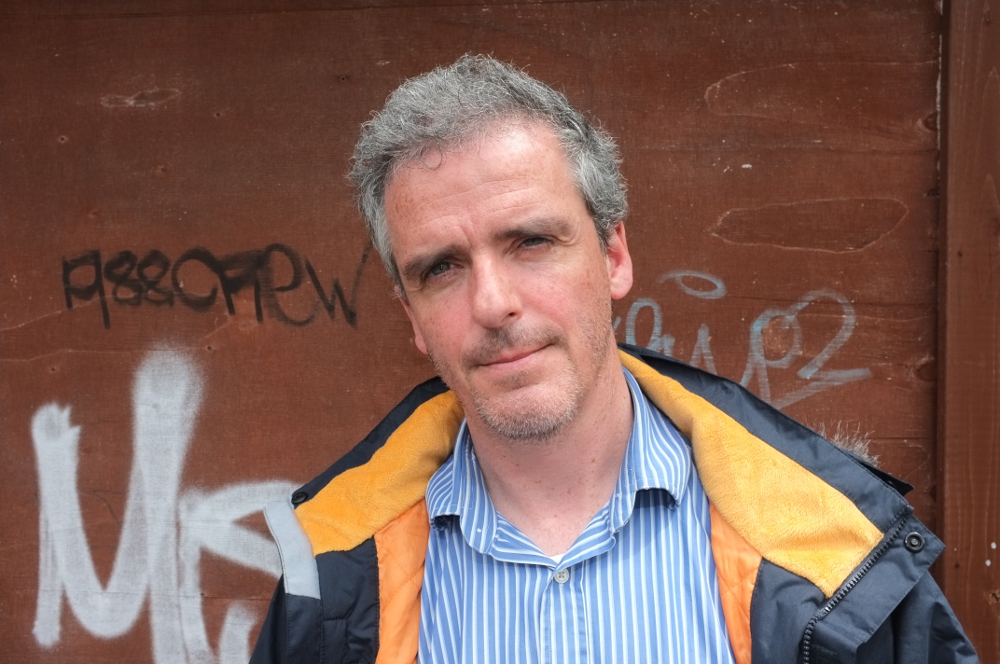
Donovan Wylie, 2014

Donovan Wylie (born 1971) is a Northern Irish photographer, based in Belfast. His work chronicles what he calls "the concept of vision as power in the architecture of contemporary conflict" – prison, army watchtowers and outposts, and listening stations – "merging documentary and art photography".

Wylie's work has been exhibited in solo exhibitions at the Imperial War Museum and The Photographers' Gallery in London, National Science and Media Museum in Bradford, and Royal Ontario Museum in Toronto; and is held in the collections of the Centre Georges Pompidou in Paris, Metropolitan Museum of Art in New York, Tate Modern in London, Yale University Art Gallery, Milwaukee Art Museum, National Gallery of Canada in Ottawa, Science Museum Group in the UK, Ulster Museum in Belfast, and Victoria and Albert Museum in London. In 2010 he was shortlisted for the Deutsche Börse Photography Prize. He was a member of Magnum Photos from 1998 to 2017.

Wylie has also made films – in 2002 he won a British Academy Film Award (BAFTA) for The Train, a 50 minute documentary written, directed and with cinematography by Wylie.

== Career ==
Wylie was born in 1971 in Belfast, Northern Ireland. He started photography in his teens while a pupil at Belfast Royal Academy, and at the age of 16 he left school and went on a three-month journey around Ireland. These travels resulted in his first book, 32 Counties, published when he was 18. In 1992, at age 20, Wylie became a nominee of the Magnum Photos agency, then a full member in 1998, and left the organisation in 2017.

Since 2000, he has completed various photographic and film projects exploring the religious identity, history, and the concept of territory, especially in Northern Ireland during The Troubles, post-ceasefire. His work has expanded over the years, and concentrates on the "architecture of conflict". His notable works include projects on The Maze Prison in Northern Ireland (2002 and 2007–2008), British watchtowers (2005–2006), and the Green Zone in Baghdad (2008). He has also worked in China, Russia, Slovakia, Spain, Israel, and Yugoslavia.

The Guardian's review of Wylie's Vision as Power exhibition at the Imperial War Museum in London stated: "Merging documentary and art photography, Wylie's images reveal both the impact of surveillance architecture on the natural landscape and the importance of surveillance in modern conflict."

Wylie's book The Maze (2004) is included in Parr and Badger's The Photobook: A History, Volume II, and his Scrapbook (2009) is included in Volume III.

In 2013, Wylie was a Doran Artist in Residence at Yale University Art Gallery, a residency that resulted in a body of American work titled A Good and Spacious Land. An exhibition of the work opened there in June 2017 alongside work by Jim Goldberg.

In 2018/2019, as a response to Brexit, he travelled around the British Isles, photographing lighthouses from neighbouring coastlines.

== Publications ==
=== Publications by Wylie ===
- 32 Counties: Photographs of Ireland.
  - London: Secker & Warburg, 1989. ISBN 978-0-436-10256-1.
  - London: Secker & Warburg, 1990. ISBN 978-0-436-10254-7.
- The Dispossessed. UK: Picador, 1990. With Robert McLiam Wilson
- Populations in Danger. UK: J. Libbey, 1992.
- Ireland: Singular Images. London: André Deutsch, 1994. ISBN 978-0-233-98899-3.
- Notes from Moscow
  - Transatlantic, 1994. ISBN 978-0-330-33032-9.
  - UK: Picador, 2004.
- Losing Ground. Fourth Estate, 1998. ISBN 1-85702-918-6. With an afterword by Andrew O'Hagan.
- The Maze.
  - London: Granta, 2004. ISBN 978-1-86207-684-6.
  - Göttingen: Steidl, 2010. ISBN 978-3-86521-907-7.
- British Watchtowers. Göttingen: Steidl, 2007. ISBN 978-3-86521-499-7.
- Scrapbook. Göttingen: Steidl, 2009. ISBN 978-3-86521-910-7. With Timothy Prus.
- Outposts: Kandahar Province. Göttingen: Steidl, 2011. ISBN 978-3-86930-321-5. With an afterword by Gerry Badger.
- North Warning System. Göttingen: Steidl, 2014. ISBN 978-3869307732.

=== Publications paired with others ===
- A Good and Spacious Land. New Haven, CT: Yale, 2017. ISBN 978-0-300-22299-9. A two-volume set with Jim Goldberg's Candy. With an introduction by Pamela Franks and essays by Christopher Klatell and Laura Wexler.

== Films ==
- The Train (Witness, episode 25) (2001), written, directed and with cinematography by Wylie – Channel 4/October Films, 50 minutes, produced by Liana Pomerantsev, Russian with English subtitles.
- YoYo (2002) – Channel 4/October Films.
- Jesus Comes To London (2003) – Channel 4/October Films.
- The 12th (season 1, episode 3) (2003), directed by Wylie – 10 minutes, produced by Fulcrum Waddell Media.

== Solo exhibitions ==
- The Maze, The Photographers' Gallery, London, 2004.
- Outposts, National Science and Media Museum, Bradford, 2011; Royal Ontario Museum, Toronto, 2012.
- Vision as Power, Imperial War Museum, London, 2013. Photographs from The Maze, British Watchtowers, Green Zone, Outposts and Arctic.

== Awards ==
- 2002: Winner, "New Director – Factual", British Academy Television Craft Awards, British Academy of Film and Television Arts (BAFTA), for The Train.
- 2002: Royal Photographic Society Vic Odden Award, Bath, UK.
- 2009: Shortlisted for the Deutsche Börse Photography Prize 2010.
- 2010: Bradford Fellowship 2010/11 from Bradford College, University of Bradford and National Science and Media Museum, UK to make Outposts.

== Collections ==
- Metropolitan Museum of Art, New York City: complete 80-picture edition of The Maze.
- Tate Modern, London: 5 prints from "British Watchtowers".
- Victoria and Albert Museum, London: 6 prints
- Milwaukee Art Museum, Milwaukee, WI: 3 items
- Irish Museum of Modern Art, Dublin
- National Gallery of Canada, Ottawa, Ontario: 4 prints
- Science Museum Group, UK: complete set of 42 prints from Losing Ground
- Centre Georges Pompidou, Paris: 6 prints
- Ulster Museum, Belfast
