= Jitka Hanzlová =

Czech photographer

- Born: 1958 (age 67–68); Náchod, Czechoslovakia

Jitka Hanzlová (born 1958) is a Czech photographer, mostly known for her portraiture.

== Biography ==
Hanzlová grew up in Rokytník, a village in eastern Bohemia. From 1978 she worked for state television in Prague. In 1982, Hanzlová fled Prague and applied for political asylum in the Federal Republic of Germany. She was initially interested in painting and drawing before discovering photography as an artistic medium in 1983. Inspired by the works of Diane Arbus and the anonymous portraits of Walker Evans, she undertook her first trip to America in 1986.

In 1987 she began studying visual communication at the University of Essen with a focus on photography, which she completed in 1994. In 1989, Stern published her first group of works under the title "Man Calls It School" about a school for asylum seekers. After the fall of the Wall and the end of the communist regime, she traveled back to her Czech homeland for the first time.

Hanzlová received further formative impulses from the perspectives of the US photographer Robert Frank and the protagonists of New Color Photography Joel Sternfeld and William Eggleston. At the beginning of the 1990s she found important mentors in Ute Eskildsen, head of the photographic collection at the Museum Folkwang, Essen, and the writer John Berger, who accompanied the creation of her works Forest (2000–2005) and Horse (2007–2016).

From 2005 to 2007, she was a visiting professor at the Hamburg University of Fine Arts, and from 2012 to 2016 at the Zurich University of the Arts.

Numerous international solo exhibitions accompany her artistic development. Since the beginnings her work has also been featured in countless group exhibitions and monographic surveys on the contemporary portrait, identity and the relation between men and nature (see bibliography). In 2019, the National Gallery Prague realized the large-scale solo exhibition Silences, curated by Adam Budak, which made the conceptual lines within her work visible for the first time.

== Work ==
Since 1990, Hanzlová has been working on groups of works in which she reflects on natural and urban living spaces.

With Rokytník, developed as a student in Essen between 1990 and 1994, she laid the basis for her other series. Under the influence of the political and social upheaval after the fall of the Berlin Wall, the series is a photographic forensic investigation in which she portrays the village, its residents within the rural landscape of her childhood. Photographed outside for the most part, the green of the meadows lend the dominant color. From the beginning her style is formally established: exclusively in upright (portrait) format, taken at eye level, with natural bright colours, rather bleak depictions of things and surroundings, quiet still lifes alternate with portraits, the subjects for the most part taking just half of the height of the picture frame, in Rokytník decidedly less yet, leaving space around them filled with atmosphere, underlining a belonging without sentimentality. The feeling of a place and above all the light is very important to her. The peaceful, almost relaxed ambience could not have been conveyed in black and white. Not a typology of any kind like that August Sander was after, nor the profound sense of the typical American reality the colour photographs of William Eggleston emanate, in Hanzlová's portraits the colours appear to belong to the individual's identity as means of self-expression.

In Bewohner, photographed between 1994 and 1996 for the most part in the Ruhr region in and around Essen, her hometown for over a decade then, the pictures of the "inhabitants" ("Bewohner" in German) and their environment get in contrast to one another; the same applies to a later group of work called Hier ("Here", 2005–2010). Rokytník was informed by portraits embedded in the landscape, animals appeared as part of rural life, a woman taking joyously a goat as a dance partner, equally tall like her on its hind legs, and a shot roe deer in the hands of a hunter. Now animals tend to be portrayed, too, and even a leafless and half-faded sun flower in a plastic pot might be seen as such. The portrait as genre commonly defined by isolating an individual or group from its surroundings (usually in a studio setting) gains significance, without neglecting the actual space and the natural light of the setting. Nevertheless, the unsmiling gaze of the portrayed women and a boy are self-assured and appear not anonymous at all. A roughly equal amount of photographs of almost abstract details of architecture, an oil patch or a picture of a plane on an foggy airfield and some landscapes translate as well into uprooting and anchorlessness. A quote from Italo Calvino's Invisible Cities on the alienation of city dwellers in stratified times in space is put in front of the sequence of photographs of Bewohner, which opens with a bird's eye panorama of snowy Berlin, a one-off view in her work and deeply symbolic for the history of Europe in the 20th century as well as every individual like herself whose life is determined by it, disrupted and connected again in a precarious way.

The large series of Female (1997–2000) and the subsequent Brixton, a district in South London with a large community of Caribbean immigrants, where she was invited by The Photographers' Gallery in 2002, consist both exclusively of portraits of women. They were most often alien to her, women she met on the street. But she gets closer; in Brixton, a small group of 23 photographs, all portraits are photographed as three-quarter figures, leaving space of about a quarter of the height and half of the picture's width. And in both series the women look all straight into the camera. In Brixton windows appear several times and work as a metaphor for the "between", a term Hanzlová uses to describe the different connections between the interior and exterior, the individual's situation in its living space and the historic dimension of belonging, loss and alienation. Crucial for these layers to translate into the picture and become visible is the connection "between" the subject and the camera in the moment of the shot: "on occasions it becomes dense while on others it miraculously transforms itself into a road of there and back again, a cord that connects the two spaces."

Nature does not appear in her long-term projects Forest (2000–2005), Vanitas (2009–2012), Horse (2007–2014) and Water (2013–2020), only as a physical image space, but also as a “psychic energy field”, charged with the potential to make metaphysical themes visible. Her photography, says the author Ulf Erdmann Ziegler, “is not only un-ideological but downright anti-ideological.”

== Awards ==
- 1993: Otto Steinert Prize, German Society for Photography, Germany
- 1995: Scholarship DG BANK Frankfurt, Germany
- 1995: European Photography Award, Germany
- 1998: Scholarship, Stiftung für Kunst und Kultur des Landes NRW, Düsseldorf, Germany
- 1999: Shortlisted for The Citibank Photography Prize 2000, London
- 2002: Shortlisted for The Citibank Photography Prize 2003, London
- 2003: Grand Prix Award – Project Grant, Rencontres d'Arles, Arles, France
- 2007: BMW–Paris Photo Prize for Contemporary Photography, France

== Publications ==
First number indicates the number of reproductions printed in the book, not actual photographs.

- Rokytník, 14 of a series of 55 colour photographs 1990–1994, texts by Lalie Nicolas (in French) and Birgitt Bischoff (in German), Centre de Photographie, Lectoure 1995, edition of 500 copies.
  - 2nd ed. with 42 photographs of the series, text by L. Fritz Gruber (in German), Städtische Museen Schloss Hardenberg, Velbert 1997, edition of 700. (Martin Parr, Gerry Badger, The Photobook, Vol. 2, p. 85).
- Bewohner, 25 of a series of 29 colour photographs 1994–1996, essay by Gertrud Peters (in German), Frankfurter Kunstverein/DG Bank, Frankfurt 1996, edition of 700
  - 2nd ed., Fotomuseum Winterthur, Richter, Düsseldorf 2001, ISBN 9783928762687, edition of 1000.
- Vielsalm, Sunparks Art Project, De Haan (The Netherlands) 1999, part of a box with four books of different artists, edition of 500.
- Female, 53 portraits 1996–2000, essays by Zdenek Felix and Peter Brinkemper (in German), Deichtorhallen, Hamburg/Schirmer/Mosel, Munich 2000, ISBN 9783888148453.
- Forest, series of 45 colour photographs 2000–2005, essay by John Berger, Steidl, Göttingen 2005, ISBN 9783865212108.
- Cotton Rose, 35 of a series of 46 colour photographs 2004–2006 taken in Japan, text by Ulf Erdmann Ziegler, Steidl, Göttingen 2017, ISBN 9783869301273, edition of 1000.
  - Reprint 2019, edition of 1000.
- Hier, series of 47 colour photographs 1998, 2003–2010, text by Terézia Mora, Koenig Books, London 2013, ISBN 9783863353247, edition of 1000, signed and numbered edition of 42 + 5 APs with print.
- Horse, 45 colour photographs of a series begun in 2007, preface by John Berger and text by Hanzlová, Koenig Books, London 2016, ISBN 9783863358778.
- Vanitas, 12 (pigmented) colour photographs (in memory of John Berger) of a series of Flowers begun in 2008, text by Barbara Hofmann-Johnson (in German/English), Museum für Photographie Braunschweig and Städtische Galerie Wolfsburg, Koenig Books, London 2018, ISBN 9783960984467.
- Instabiles, Gerhard Theewen/Salon, Cologne 2022, ISBN 9783897704923.

=== Profile and retrospective publications ===
- Cahier 2, ed. with Annette and Rudolf Kicken, essays by Janos Frecot and Rudolf Sagmeister, Kicken, Berlin 2011.
- Jitka Hanzlová, catalogue of the first retrospective with 139 photographs of all series begun before 2012, including two previously unpublished series of portraits, Brixton and There Is Something I Don't Know, text and interview by Isabel Tejera, texts by Zdenek Felix, John Berger (from Forest), Terézia Mora (from Here) and Jesús Carrillo Castillo, biography by Carlos Martin García, Fundación Mapfre, TF Editores, Madrid 2012, ISBN 9788498443912.
- Silences, essays by Urs Stahel and Adam Budak, interview with Zdenek Felix, National Gallery Prague in cooperation with Koenig Books, London 2019, ISBN 978-3-96098-739-0.

== Solo exhibitions ==
- Scottish National Portrait Gallery, Edinburgh, 2012.
- Between Continuum. Photography and film works since 1990, Museum für Photographie, Braunschweig; Städtische Galerie Wolfsburg, Germany, 2018.

== Collections ==
Hanzlová's work is held in the following permanent collections:

- Austria: EVN Collection, Maria Enzernsdorf
- Belgium: Museum voor Fotografie, Antwerp
- Czech Republic: Center for Contemporary Arts Prague: 27 prints from 1990 to 2011
- France: Bibliothèque nationale de France, Paris
- Germany: Museum Ludwig, Cologne (and Gruber Collection at the Museum)

- Deutsche Börse Photography Foundation, Frankfurt: 20 prints
- DZ Bank Collection, Frankfurt
- Munich Stadtmuseum, Munich

- The Netherlands, Stedelijk Museum, Amsterdam: 20 prints from Bewohner, Hier, Female and Forest (as of November 2023)

- KPN Collection, Amsterdam
- De Hallen Museum, Haarlem

- Spain, Fundación Mapfre, Madrid
- Switzerland: Fotomuseum Winterthur: 11 prints from Rokytník and 5 from Horse (as of November 2023)

- Ringier Collection, Zurich

- UK: National Galleries of Scotland, Edinburgh: 3 prints of There Is Something I Don't Know (as of November 2023)

- Citigroup Collection, London

- USA: Refco Collection, Chicago: 9 prints (as of 2003)

- Museum of Modern Art, New York: 6 prints (as of October 2018)
- San Francisco Museum of Modern Art: 2 prints (as of October 2018)
