= Kate Steciw =

- Born: 1978 (age 47–48); Bethlehem, Pennsylvania
- Education: Smith College, School of the Art Institute of Chicago
- Known for: New media, digital art
- Notable work: Springtime Entropy, DEEP COMMON, Anima, Animal, Beheaded, Candle, Chocolate, Cloak, Carnal, Darkness, Deity, Dreamlike, Gradient, Headless, Heparin, Ignite, Ignat, Lament, Occult, Partial, Pink, Smoke, Smokey, Smother
- Movement: Contemporary

Kate Steciw (born 1978 in Bethlehem, Pennsylvania) is a contemporary artist working in Brooklyn, New York, who uses sculpture, photography, video, and image manipulation in her artwork. She attended Smith College in Northampton, Massachusetts, where she obtained her undergraduate degree in sociology and political science. She then attended the School of the Art Institute of Chicago, where she received her Master of Fine Arts in photography. For 10 years she worked a day job as an image retoucher at Art + Commerce and made pieces in her spare time.

== Practice ==
Kate Steciw's works examine the evolving understanding of the physical object in relation to its digital representation and distribution online. Steciw is "interested in the collision between representation (mostly virtual or computer-mediated) and materialization which I think is so characteristic of contemporary experience." Informed by her 10 years of experience as a commercial photography retoucher, Steciw often manipulates stock images of objects into collages, removing them from their commercial context and reinterpreting the images as art objects. Because much of Steciw's work considers the object within the context of mass media and Web 2.0, her art can be associated with the postinternet movement. Steciw is often inspired by happenings in popular media, as well as works by Karl Marx, Pierre Bourdieu, Max Weber, Jean Baudrillard, Gilles Deleuze, Siegfried Kracauer, and especially Knut Hamsun.

== Solo exhibitions ==
=== Love My Way ===
Love My Way was Steciw's first solo exhibition, and was held at the Primary Photographic Gallery in New York City, New York in 2011.

=== Boundless Hyper ===
Boundless Hyper (2012), an exhibit that contained three of her photographic manipulation pieces, took place at Toomer Labzda Gallery in New York City, New York. Each piece spanned 60 inches by 44 inches and was framed in oak wood.

=== Live, Laugh, Love ===
Live, Laugh, Love (2012) was Steciw's first solo exhibition to be held outside of the United States. It took place in London and was held at The Composing Rooms, curated by Ché Zara Blomfield. This installation consisted of her photographic works Exercises in Spacial Mnemonics (2011) and Versions on a Calico House Cat (2010), as well as her sculptural pieces Live Laugh Love (2012) and My Dog (2011).

=== Debaser ===
Debaser (2013), another solo exhibition held outside the U.S., contained a combination of her sculptural and photographic works, and was held at the Elaine Levy Project in Brussels, Belgium.

=== New Custom Wall Art ===
New Custom Wall Art (2014), one of her more recent solo exhibitions, took place at Annarumma Gallery in Naples, Italy.
