= Mark Ruwedel =

American landscape photographer and educator

Mark Ruwedel (born June 11, 1954) is an American landscape photographer and educator.

His books include Westward the Course of Empire, depicting the remains of abandoned railway lines in the landscape of the western United States and Canada; and Message from the Exterior, abandoned and decaying houses in desert communities around Los Angeles.

Ruwedel was associate professor at Concordia University, Montreal from 1984 to 2001 and has been Professor of Art at California State University, Long Beach since 2002. He is based in both California and coastal British Columbia.

In 2014, he was awarded both a Guggenheim Fellowship and the Scotiabank Photography Award. In 2018, he was shortlisted for the Deutsche Börse Photography Prize. He has had solo exhibitions at the Chinati Foundation, Presentation House Gallery and Southern Alberta Art Gallery. His work is held in the collections of the J. Paul Getty Museum, Los Angeles County Museum of Art, Metropolitan Museum of Art, Museum of Contemporary Photography, National Gallery of Art, National Gallery of Canada, and San Francisco Museum of Modern Art.

== Life and work ==
Ruwedel was born in Bethlehem, Pennsylvania, USA. He graduated with a BFA in painting from Kutztown State College, Kutztown, Pennsylvania in 1978. He gained a Master of Fine Arts degree from Concordia University in Montreal, Québec in 1983.

As of 2014, he was based in both California and coastal British Columbia.

=== Photography ===
Ruwedel is a landscape photographer. He photographs the "material residue or evidence of massive invisible forces at work on populations." He has written: "I am interested in revealing the narratives contained within the landscape, especially those places where the land reveals itself as being both an agent of change and the field of human endeavour." Stanley Wolukau-Wanambwa has written of Ruwedel that "On the one hand, [he works] in series, which are repetitive, categorical and often open-ended engagements. On the other, [he works] from premises that can be enumerated by arbitrary data, like the number of palms in the titles of desert sites in California…"

Ruwedel predominantly uses a Linhof 4×5 large format view camera, which records a lot of detail. Captions are an intrinsic element of his pictures. He is influenced by the New Topographics photographers ("survey of natural beauty permanently altered by human industry"), particularly Lewis Baltz and Robert Adams; also by Walker Evans, Robert Smithson and 19th-century American and European expeditionary photography.

Columbia River: the Hanford Stretch, published in 1993, is a series of black and white landscape photographs at the Hanford Site, a nuclear complex on the Columbia River whose reactors made plutonium for nuclear weapons.

The Italian Navigator, published in 2001, is a series of black and white photographs of the sites of Cold War era nuclear weapons testing in the USA.

From 1999 to the present, Ruwedel has documented the work of contemporary artists who have made land art. He has also photographed evidence of human activity in the landscape that are thousands of years old.

Crossing is a series of colour photographs that show traces of illegal immigration as evidenced by litter and other artefacts left near the Mexico–United States border.

Westward the Course of Empire, published in 2008, is a series of black and white landscape photographs for which Ruwedel "walked and photographed along more than 130 abandoned railway lines that had once crossed hundreds of miles of desert and tunnelled through mountain ranges" in the western United States and Canada. It was made between 1994 and 2006. "The pictures followed the skeleton tracks across plains, through cuts blasted in the rock, into derelict tunnels and over the remains of wooden trestles that carried the rails across rivers and creeks."

One Thousand Two Hundred Twelve Palms, published in 2010, is a series of photographs of all the places in the deserts of California named for a number of palms. It was made over about one year and the total number of palms mentioned adds up to 1212.

Message from the Exterior, published in 2015, is a series of black and white "portraits" of abandoned and decaying houses in desert communities around the Los Angeles metropolitan area. Made over the same ten-year period, Dog Houses, published in 2017, is a series of color photographs of doghouses found in those desert regions.

Pictures of Hell is a series of black and white photographs of places in Canada and the US, each with a name that includes mention of Hell or the Devil. It was made over twenty years and published in 2014.

Ruwedel's first work made outside North America is Ouarzazate, photographs of movie sets in Ouarzazate in the Moroccan desert, made in 2014 and 2016 and published in 2018.

=== Teaching ===
Ruwedel was associate professor at Concordia University, Montreal for sixteen years from 1984 to 2001. He has been professor of art at California State University, Long Beach since 2002. He has also taught at Nova Scotia College of Art and Design, Halifax, Nova Scotia, Canada.

== Publications ==
- Columbia River: the Hanford Stretch. Self-published, 1993. ISBN 9780969769705.
- The Italian Navigator. Montreal: Art 45, 2001. ISBN 9780968838303. In English and French.
- Written on the Land. North Vancouver: Presentation House Gallery, 2002. Curated and edited by Karen Love. ISBN 978-0920293560. With essays by Barry Lopez and Ann Thomas, and a foreword by Bill Jeffries. Exhibition catalogue. "photographs from his entire oeuvre."
- Westward the Course of Empire. New Haven: Yale University Press, 2008. ISBN 978-0300141344. With an essay by Jock Reynolds.
- One Thousand Two Hundred Twelve Palms. New Haven: Yale University Art Gallery, 2010. ISBN 9780894679780.
- Pictures of Hell. Santa Monica, CA: RAM, 2014. Edited by Simon Baker and Sébastien Montabonel. ISBN 978-0970386038. With essays by Simon Baker and Chiara Siravo. Edition of 1000 copies.
- Message from the Exterior. Göttingen: Steidl, 2015. ISBN 9783869308043. With an essay by Mark Haworth-Booth. The first part of the book contains photographs from Ruwedel's archive of "Desert Houses," the second part contains the series "Dusk," images of desert houses after sunset.
  - London: Mack, 2016. ISBN 978-1910164464.
  - Special edition. London: Mack, 2016. Two hardback volumes. Edition of 150 copies.
- Mark Ruwedel: Scotiabank Photography Award. Göttingen: Steidl, 2015. ISBN 978-3-86930-928-6.
- Dog Houses. Santa Monica, CA: RAM, 2017. ISBN 978-0-9859958-9-8.
- Ouarzazate. London: Mack, 2018. ISBN 978-1-912339-26-6.
- Seventy-Two and One Half Miles Across Los Angeles. London: Mack, 2020. ISBN 978-1-912339-78-5.

=== Handmade artist's books ===
- We All Loved Ruscha.
- Nevada Nevada.

== Exhibitions ==
=== Solo exhibitions ===
- Chinati Foundation, Installation for Art and Architecture Symposium, Marfa, TX, 1998
- Mark Ruwedel: Written On The Land, Presentation House Gallery, Vancouver, BC, 2002; Southern Alberta Art Gallery, Lethbridge, AB, 2003

=== Group exhibitions ===
- Exposed: Voyeurism, Surveillance and the Camera, Tate Modern, London, 2010
- Points of View, Rencontres d'Arles, Arles, France, 2011
- Scotiabank Contact Photography Festival, Toronto, Canada, 2015. A prize of $50,000.

== Awards ==
- 2014: Guggenheim Fellowship from the John Simon Guggenheim Memorial Foundation
- 2014: Scotiabank Photography Award, Canada
- 2018: Shortlisted, Deutsche Börse Photography Prize 2019 for his exhibition, The Artist and Society, at Tate Modern

== Collections ==
Ruwedel's work is held in the following public collections:

- J. Paul Getty Museum, Los Angeles, CA: 38 prints (as of February 2019)
- Los Angeles County Museum of Art, Los Angeles, CA
- Metropolitan Museum of Art, New York, NY: 9 prints (as of February 2019)
- Musée national des beaux-arts du Québec, Québec
- Museum of Contemporary Photography, Columbia College Chicago, Chicago, IL: 5 prints (as of February 2019)
- National Gallery of Art, Washington, D.C.: 28 prints (as of February 2019)
- National Gallery of Canada, Ottawa, Ontario: 148 works (as of February 2019)
- San Francisco Museum of Modern Art, San Francisco, CA: 32 prints (as of February 2019)
- Vancouver Art Gallery, Vancouver, British Columbia
