= Paris Photo =

International photography art fair

Coordinates: 48.8662°N 2.3125°E

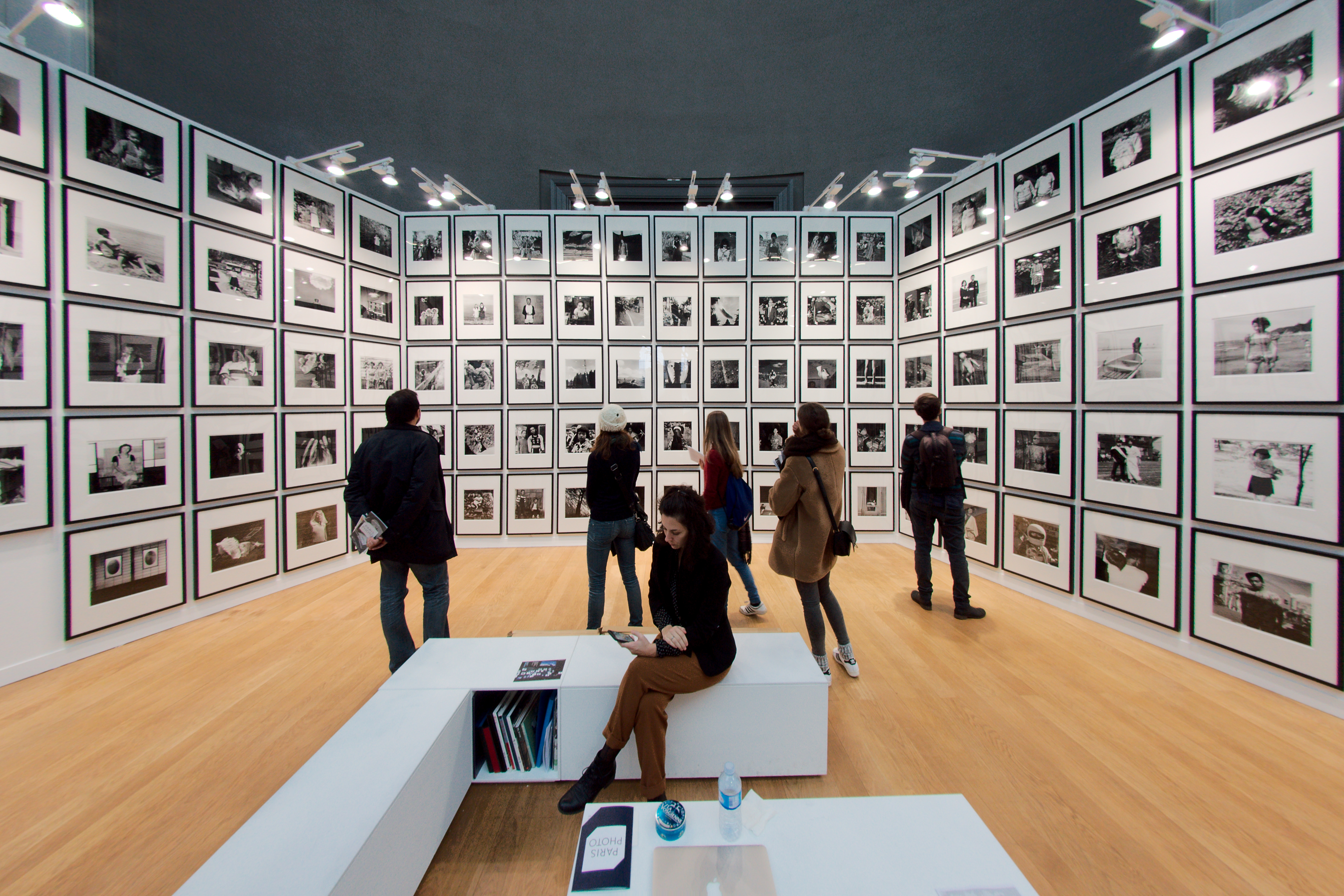
Salon d'honneur at the Paris Photo (2016)

Paris Photo is an annual international art fair dedicated to photography and image-based art. It was founded in 1997, and is held in November at the Grand Palais exhibition hall and museum complex, located near the Champs-Élysées in the 8th arrondissement in Paris.

The fair consists of photo-based artwork alongside a public programme of exhibitions, prizes, art signings and talks. It includes five sectors, including a "Voices", "Digital", "Emergence" and "Book".

The fair starts with a Vernissage, by invitation only, on Wednesday, followed by the main fair on Thursday to Sunday.

== History ==
Founded in 1997, Paris Photo presented 53 galleries for its first edition at the Carrousel du Louvre. The Fair was acquired by Reed Expositions France (now Reed Exhibitions (RX)) in 2001 and relocated to the Grand Palais in 2011.

In 2006, public attendance was 40,000. In 2017, over 64,500 visitors attended the 5-day fair. In 2024, there were more than 80,000 visitors, 1,700 artists and 400 book signings, 7,000 collectors, 245 exhibitors from more than 30 different countries, and representatives from 200 museums and institutions.

Florence Bourgeois is its current Director, and Anna Planas is the Artistic Director. She was preceded by Julien Frydman (2011–2015), Guillaume Piens (2008–2010), Valerie Foujerole (2005–2007), and Rik Gadella (1997–2004). Selection Committees select the "Galleries" and "Publishers" based on "the quality and the originality of each submitted project with a particular attention given to the diversity of expression and the relevance of the proposed installations presented in each application".

In the past, there have been two sister editions of Paris Photo: Paris Photo Los Angeles from 2013 through 2015 at the Paramount Pictures Studios in Hollywood and Photo London at Old Billings Gate in 2007. The inaugural edition in New York City was postponed in 2020 due to the COVID-19 pandemic. The artwork was displayed online instead. Between 2021 and 2023, the fair temporarily relocated to the Grand Palais Éphémère because the Grand Palais was closed for renovation.

The 2025 edition, the 28th edition, took place from 12 to 16 November 2025. Paris Photo 2025 had 222 exhibitors, with 179 galleries and 43 publishers from 33 countries.

== The Paris Photo–Aperture Foundation PhotoBook Awards ==
First taking place in November 2012, the Paris Photo–Aperture Foundation PhotoBook Awards have "celebrated and honored the essential role of the photobook in the dissemination and evolution of photography". These awards are given jointly by Paris Photo and Aperture Foundation. There are three categories: First PhotoBook, PhotoBook of the Year, and Photography Catalogue of the Year. A Jurors' Special Mention is also awarded.

After a call for submissions, a preliminary jury meeting in New York City selects a shortlist. The shortlisted books are exhibited at Paris Photo. The final jury meets in Paris during Paris Photo to select each year's winners, which are announced at the Fair. The winner of the First PhotoBook category receives a $10,000 prize. The winners of the other two categories each receive a commemorative award.

== List of PhotoBook Award Winners ==
2016 Award winners

- PhotoBook of the Year: Gregory Halpern, ZZYZX. Mack, 2016. Designed by Lewis Chaplin.
- First PhotoBook ($10,000 prize): Michael Christopher Brown, Libyan Sugar. Twin Palms Publishers, 2016. Designed by Brown and Ramon Pez.
- Photography Catalogue of the Year: Karolina Puchała-Rojek and pl:Karolina Ziębińska-Lewandowska, Wojciech Zamecznik: Photo-graphics. pl:Fundacja Archeologia Fotografii, 2015. Designed by Anna Piwowar and Magdalena Piwowar.
- Jurors' Special Mention: de:Annett Gröschner and Arwed Messmer, Taking Stock of Power: An Other View of the Berlin Wall. Hatje Cantz, 2016. Designed by Carsten Eisfeld.

2017 Award winners

- PhotoBook of the Year: Dayanita Singh, Museum Bhavan. Steidl, 2017. Designed by Singh and Gerhard Steidl.
- First PhotoBook ($10,000 prize): Mathieu Asselin, Monsanto: A Photographic Investigation. Kettler/Acte Sud, 2017. Designed by Ricardo Báez.
- Photography Catalogue of the Year: Mattie Boom, Hans Rooseboom, New Realities: Photography in the 19th Century. Rijksmuseum/NAI, 2017. Designed by Irma Boom Office (Irma Boom/Tariq Heijboer).
- Juror's Special Mention: Carlos Spottorno and Guillermo Abril, La Grieta (The Crack). es:Astiberri Ediciones, 2016.

2018 Award winners

- PhotoBook of the Year: Laia Abril, On Abortion. Dewi Lewis Publishing.
- Photography Catalogue of the Year: Ursula Schulz-Dornburg,The Land in Between. Mack.
- First PhotoBook ($10,000 prize): Stanley Wolukau-Wanambwa, One Wall a Web. Roma Publications.
- Juror's Special Mention: Pixy Liao, Experimental Relationship Vol. 1. Jiazazhi Press.

2019 Award winners

- PhotoBook of the Year: Sohrab Hura, The Coast. Ugly Dog (self-published).
- Photography Catalogue of the Year: Hannah Darabi, Enghelab Street, A Revolution through Books: Iran 1979–1983. Spector Books and Le Bal.
- First PhotoBook ($10,000 prize): Gao Shan, The Eighth Day. Imageless.
- Juror's Special Mention: Drew Nikonowicz, This World and Others Like It. Publishers: Fw:Books and Yoffy Press.

2020 Award winners

- PhotoBook of the Year: Gloria Oyarzabal, Woman Go No’Gree, Editorial RM and Images Vevey, Barcelona and Vevey, Switzerland.
- First PhotoBook ($10,000 prize): Buck Ellison, Living Trust, Loose Joints Publishing, Marseille, France.
- Photography Catalogue of the Year: Tina M. Campt, Marianne Hirsch, Gil Hochberg and Brian Wallis, Imagining Everyday Life: Engagements with Vernacular Photography, Walther Collection and Steidl, New York and Göttingen, Germany.
- Jurors' Special Mention: Ryan Debolski, LIKE, Gnomic Book, Brooklyn.

2021 Award winners

- PhotoBook of the Year: Muhammad Faldi and Fatris MF, The Banda Journal, Jordan, jordan Édition, Jakarta, Indonesia.
- First PhotoBook ($10,000 prize): Sasha Phyars-Burgess, Untitled, Capricious Publishing, New York.
- Photography Catalogue of the Year: Russet Lederman and Olga Yatskevich, What They Saw: Historical Photobooks by Women, 1843–1999, 10x10 Photobooks, New York.
- Jurors' Special Mention: Vasantha Yogananthan, Amma, Chose Commune, Marseille, France.

2022 Award winners

- PhotoBook of the Year: Mohamed Bourouissa, Périphérique, Loose Joints, Marseille, France.
- First PhotoBook ($10,000 prize): Sabiha Çimen, HAFIZ, Red Hook Editions, New York.
- Photography Catalogue of the Year: Makeda Best, Devour the Land: War and American Landscape Photography since 1970, Harvard Art Museums, Cambridge, Massachusetts.
- Jurors' Special Mention: Tokuko Ushioda, My Husband, torch press, Tokyo.

2023 Award winners

- PhotoBook of the Year: Vince Aletti, The Drawer, SPBH Editions, London.
- First PhotoBook ($10,000 prize): Carla Williams, Tender, TBW Books, Oakland, California.
- Photography Catalogue of the Year: Diwas Raja Kc and NayanTara Gurung Kakshapati, The Public Life of Women: A Feminist Memory Project, Nepal Picture Library / photo.circle, Kathmandu, Nepal.
- Jurors' Special Mention: Sandrine Colard, Recaptioning Congo: African Stories and Colonial Pictures, Lannoo Publishers, Tielt, Belgium, and Fotomuseum FOMU, Antwerp, Belgium.

2024 Award winners

- PhotoBook of the Year: Taysir Batniji, Disruptions, Loose Joints Publishing, Marseille, France / London, design by Loose Joints Studio.
- First PhotoBook ($10,000 prize): Tsai Ting Bang, Born from the Same Root, self-published, Taipei, design by Tsai Ting Bang and Shū Hé Zhì.
- Photography Catalogue of the Year: Joy Gregory and Taous Dahmani, Shining Lights: Black Women Photographers in 1980s–90s Britain, Autograph and MACK, London, design by Morgan Crowcroft-Brown).
- Jurors' Special Mention: Hady Barry, i am (not) your mother, self-published, Penumbra Foundation, New York, design by Hady Barry.

2025 Award winners

- PhotoBook of the Year: Hicham Benohoud, The Classroom, Loose Joints Publishing, Marseille, France / London, design by Loose Joints Studio.
- First PhotoBook ($10,000 prize): Eleonora Agostini, A Study on Waitressing, Witty Books, Turin, design by Massimiliano Pace.
- Photography Catalogue of the Year: Catarina Boieiro and Raquel Schefer, Generalized Visual Resistance: Photobooks and Liberation Movements, ATLAS, Lisbon, design by Teo Furtado and Ana Schefer.
- Jurors' Special Mention: Pia-Paulina Guilmoth, Flowers Drink the River, STANLEY/BARKER, London, design by ramel·luzoir.

2026 Award winners

- PhotoBook of the Year: Keisha Scarville, Passports, 2012–2025 (MACK, London) (design by Keisha Scarville and Morgan Crowcroft-Brown).
- First PhotoBook ($10,000 prize): Moeko Ishiguro, Notation(s) (Self-published, Tokyo) (design by Moeko Ishiguro).
- Photography Catalogue of the Year: Anne Lacoste and Rose Durr, L Is for Look: Children’s Photobooks, (Spector Books, Leipzig) (design by Ina Kwon and Helmut Völter).
- Jurors' Special Mention: Sara Bennett, Looking Inside: Women with Life Sentences (Kehrer Verlag, Heidelberg) (design by Teun van der Heijden and Heijdens Karwei).

== See also ==
- French art salons and academies
