= Carolyn Drake =

American photographer (b. 1971)

Carolyn Drake (born 1971) is an American photographer based in Vallejo, California. She works on long term photo-based projects seeking to interrogate dominant historical narratives and imagine alternatives to them. Her work explores community and the interactions within it, as well as the barriers and connections between people, between places and between ways of perceiving. Her practice has embraced collaboration, and through this, collage, drawing, sewing, text, and found images have been integrated into her work. She is interested in collapsing the traditional divide between author and subject, the real and the imaginary, challenging entrenched binaries.

Drake's extensive work among people in Central Asia, and Xinjiang in China, is presented in two self-published books, Two Rivers and Wild Pigeon. The San Francisco Museum of Modern Art presented a solo exhibition of the latter and acquired the collection of original works from the project in 2018.

Drake is a member of Magnum Photos. She has been awarded a Guggenheim Fellowship, the Lange-Taylor Prize, the Anamorphosis photo book prize, a Fulbright fellowship, a World Press Photo award and the HCB Award. Her work is held in the collections of the U.S. Library of Congress and San Francisco Museum of Modern Art.

Her exhibition Men Untitled was on view at the Henri Cartier-Bresson Foundation, Paris, from September 2023 - January 2024.

== Life and work ==
Drake was born in California. She studied Media/Culture and History in the early 1990s at Brown University. She had a "multimedia job in New York's Silicon Alley" until starting as a photographer at the age of 30.

In 2006 she moved to Ukraine and in 2007 to Istanbul, Turkey, until 2013. Whilst based in Istanbul she made two long term projects, one in the central Asian countries that were part of the Soviet Union, Two Rivers, and one on the Chinese side of central Asia, Wild Pigeon.

Partly funded by a Guggenheim Fellowship, Drake made fifteen journeys over five years travelling and photographing in the once vibrant region of central Asia that lies between the Amu Darya and Syr Darya rivers that once nourished it. The region, encompassing Turkmenistan, Uzbekistan, Tajikistan, Kazakhstan and Kyrgyzstan, was transformed when the rivers were diverted for cotton irrigation by the former Soviet Union. Drake's resulting self-published book, Two Rivers (2013), was financed via Kickstarter; it was well received by Sean O'Hagan. For Jeffrey Ladd, the book's design (by Sybren Kuiper), notably the way some photographs on recto pages have their right edges on the verso, detracted from it.

She spent seven years visiting Xinjiang in western China (officially called Xinjiang Uyghur Autonomous Region), photographing the Uyghur people for her self-published book Wild Pigeon (2014). There is discord between the Chinese authorities and the indigenous ethnic Uyghur population. Sean O'Hagan wrote about Wild Pigeon that "Drake is a master of atmosphere"; and by Martin Parr; Colin Pantall; Blake Andrews; and Ian Denis Johnson, who wrote "this book does what a great social novel does: it forces us to think of a contested region not in terms of op-eds or political analyses, but as seen by people in daily life". For Jeffrey Ladd, the design of the book (again by Sybren Kuiper) avoided the excesses of that of Two Rivers, and "The results of the collages [by the people Drake photographed] are unexpectedly rich and create the sense of a place that is both [ordinary] with daily routine and imbued with the fantastic that is accented by Drake's own perceptions: young teenagers dance under a burst of colored light; a classroom that seems to take on surreal drama; a dog fight; skeletal remains hanging in a butcher shop."

In 2013 Drake and her partner, photographer Andres Gonzalez, moved from Istanbul to the United States to begin a new body of work, and moved to Water Valley, Mississippi, then in 2015 to Athens, Georgia, and finally to Vallejo, California in 2016.

In 2015 she became a nominee member of Magnum Photos, in 2017 an associate member, and in 2019 a full member.

== Publications ==
=== Publications by Drake ===
- Two Rivers. Self-published, 2013. ISBN 978-0-615-78764-0. Edition of 700 copies. Accompanied by a separate book with a short essay by Elif Batuman and notes by Drake.
- Wild Pigeon. Self-published, 2014. ISBN 978-0-692-27539-9. Edition of 950 copies. Includes a story, "Wild Pigeon", by Nurmuhemmet Yasin, and translated by Kolkun Kamberi; and "a small booklet glued to the inside of the back cover".
- Internat. Self-published, 2017. ISBN 978-0-692-94280-2. Edition of 500 copies.
- Knit Club. Oakland, CA: TBW, 2020. ISBN 978-1-942953-40-1. With an essay by Rebecca Bengal.
- Men Untitled. TBW, 2023. ISBN 978-1-942953-60-9. In English and French. Edition of 1500 copies.

=== Publications paired with another ===
- I'll let you be in my dreams if I can be in yours. Mack, 2024. With Andres Gonzalez. ISBN 978-1-915743-51-0.

=== Publications with contributions by Drake ===
- Street Photography Now. London: Thames & Hudson, 2010. ISBN 978-0-500-54393-1 (hardback). London: Thames & Hudson, 2011. ISBN 978-0-500-28907-5 (paperback). Edited by Sophie Howarth and Stephen McLaren.
- The Catalogue Box. Dortmund: Kettler; Cologne: The PhotoBook Museum, 2014. Edited by Markus Schaden and Frederic Lezmi. German and English text. ISBN 978-3-86206-394-9. Box with individual publications (also available separately) each by Ali Taptik, Anders Petersen, Andrea Diefenbach, Carlos Spottorno, Carolyn Drake, Chargesheimer, Cristina de Middel, Daidō Moriyama, David Alan Harvey, Dominique Darbois, Ed Templeton, Hans-Jürgen Raabe, Jiang Jian, Julian Germain, Marks of Honour, Oliver Sieber, Martin Parr and Gerry Badger, Ricardo Cases, Stephen Gill, Susan Meiselas, and Todd Hido. Published on the occasion of the inauguration of the PhotoBook Museum.

== Awards ==
- 2005: First Place, Community Awareness Award, 62nd Pictures of the Year International Competition, Pictures of the Year International, for "The Lubavitch" an untitled photograph from Two Rivers.
- 2006 Fulbright Fellowship in Ukraine
- 2008: Lange-Taylor Prize, Center for Documentary Studies at Duke University, Durham, NC. Awarded to Drake and Ilan Greenberg for Becoming Chinese: Uighurs in Cultural Transition.
- 2009: Pulitzer Center Grant, Pulitzer Center on Crisis Reporting, Washington, D.C.
- 2010: Guggenheim Fellowship from the John Simon Guggenheim Memorial Foundation.
- Open Society Foundations grant.
- 2014: Magnum Foundation Emergency Fund Grantee.
- 2016: Winner, Anamorphosis Prize, for Wild Pigeon, receiving $10,000 USD.
- 2018 HCP fellowship
- 2019: Light Work Artist Residency, Syracuse NY.
- 2021: HCB Award from the Henri Cartier-Bresson Foundation for the project Centaur (working title)

== Exhibitions ==
=== Solo exhibitions ===
- Wild Pigeon at SFMOMA
- Internat at Houston Center for Photography, Officine Fotografiche, and SIFEST
- Carolyn Drake: Photographs of Central Asia, Pitt Rivers Museum, University of Oxford, Oxford, UK, May–November 2009 (Note: Exhibited partially concurrently with Across the Caucasus: Photographs and Manuscripts from the John F. Baddeley Collection, 1 May – 30 September 2009, "On show in the Museum's special display case for original photographic material".)
- Paradise Rivers, July–August 2010, Third Floor Gallery, Cardiff, Wales
- Men Untitled, Henri Cartier-Bresson Foundation, Paris, September 19, 2023 – January 14, 2024

=== Exhibitions with others ===
- Street Photography Now, Third Floor Gallery, Cardiff, October–November 2010. Photographs from the book Street Photography Now (2011).
- Two Rivers, The Gallery, Guernsey Photography Festival, Guernsey, June 2011.
- Open Society Foundations, New York, March–October 2011, part of Moving Walls 18; photographs by Drake and Samantha Box, Gabriela Bulisova, Andrea Diefenbach, Bénédicte Desrus, Abdi Roble and Tadej Žnidarčič.
- Cartier-Bresson: A Question of Colour, Somerset House, London, November 2012 – January 2013. Photographs by Drake and Henri Cartier-Bresson, Karl Baden, Melanie Einzig, Andy Freeberg, Harry Gruyaert, Ernst Haas, Fred Herzog, Saul Leiter, Helen Levitt, Jeff Mermelstein, Joel Meyerowitz, Trent Parke, Boris Savelev, Robert Walker and Alex Webb.
- Women of Vision: National Geographic Photographers on Assignment, National Geographic Museum, Washington D.C., October 2013 – March 2014. Photographs by Drake, Lynsey Addario, Kitra Cahana, Jodi Cobb, Diane Cook, Lynn Johnson, Beverly Joubert, Erika Larsen, Stephanie Sinclair, Maggie Stever and Amy Toensing.
- Milk Gallery, New York City, April–May 2016. Photographs by Drake and Matt Black, Sohrab Hura, Lorenzo Meloni, Max Pinckers, and Newsha Tavakolian.
- Close to Home, Creativity in Crisis, San Francisco Museum of Modern Art, San Francisco, CA, March–September 2021.
- Close Enough: New Perspectives from 12 Women Photographers of Magnum

== Collections ==
Drake's work is held in the following public collections:

- Library of Congress, Washington, D.C.
- San Francisco Museum of Modern Art, San Francisco, CA: 27 prints (as of 12 October 2023)
