= Paul Graham (photographer) =

English photographer (born 1956)

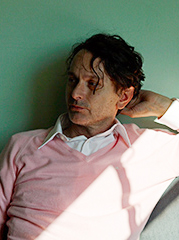
- Graham in 2006
- Born: 1956 (age 69–70)
- Education: Self-taught
- Known for: Fine art photography
- Website: paulgrahamarchive.com

Paul Graham (born 1956) is a British fine-art and documentary photographer. He has published three survey monographs, along with 26 other dedicated books.

His work has been exhibited in the Italian Pavilion of the 49th Venice Biennale (2001), Switzerland's national Fotomuseum Winterthur, and a solo exhibition at New York City's Museum of Modern Art. He was included in Tate's Cruel and Tender survey exhibition of 20th century photography (2003), and a European mid career survey exhibition at Museum Folkwang, Essen, which toured to the Deichtorhallen, Germany, and Whitechapel Gallery, London. A 2015 survey of his American work, The Whiteness of the Whale, was exhibited at the High Museum of Art in Atlanta.

Graham has won the Deutsche Börse Photography Prize, the 2012 Hasselblad Award which is widely regarded as the 'Nobel Prize of Photography', received a 2010 Guggenheim Fellowship, and the inaugural Paris Photo-Aperture Foundation PhotoBook Award prize for best photographic book of the past 15 years.

== Life and career ==
Between 1981 and the end of 1982, Graham photographed people and places along the A1 road in Britain (which mainly parallels the Great North Road), from the Bank of England in the City of London, and travelling north. His portrait of the nation was published in 1983 as A1: The Great North Road.

His book Empty Heaven is devoted to Japan; another, A Shimmer of Possibility, comprises 12 volumes examining everyday life in the USA.

== Publications ==
=== Books of work by Graham ===
- A1 - The Great North Road. Bristol: Grey, 1983. ISBN 978-0950870304.
  - London: Mack, 2020. ISBN 978-1-912339-94-5. With an introduction by Rupert Martin, and afterwords by Graham for the 1983 and the 2020 editions.
- Beyond Caring. Bristol: Grey, 1985. ISBN 978-0950870311.
  - Books on Books 9. New York: Errata, 2010. ISBN 9781935004165. With essays by David Chandler and Jeffrey Ladd. Facsimile edition.
  - London: Mack, 2021. ISBN 978-1-913620-12-7. With one additional photograph.
- Troubled Land. Bristol: Grey, 1987. ISBN 978-0950870328.
- In Umbra Res. Bradford: National Museum of Photography, Film, and Television, 1991.
- New Europe. Fotomuseum Winterthur, 1992. ISBN 978-0948797378.
- Empty Heaven. Zurich: Scalo, 1995. ISBN 978-1881616535.
- Paul Graham. Contemporary Artists. Phaidon, London, 1996. With texts by Andrew Wilson, Carol Squiers, Kazuo Ishiguro, Haruki Murakami and Graham, and interviews between Graham and Gillian Wearing and Lewis Baltz. ISBN 9780714835501.
- End of an Age. Zurich: Scalo, 1999. ISBN 978-3908247173.
- Paintings. New York, NY: Greenberg Van Doren Gallery, 2000. ISBN 978-0967757339.
- American Night. Göttingen: SteidlMack, 2003. ISBN 978-3-88243-919-9.
- A Shimmer of Possibility. Göttingen: SteidlMack, 2007. ISBN 978-3865214836. 12 volume hardback.
  - A Shimmer of Possibility. Göttingen: SteidlMack, 2009. Single volume softback.
  - A Shimmer of Possibility. London: Mack, 2018. ISBN 978-1-910164-17-4. 12 volume hardback. New edition.
- Paul Graham. Göttingen: SteidlMack, 2009. ISBN 978-3865218582.
- Europe: America. Madrid: La Fábrica, 2011. ISBN 978-8415303343. Said to juxtapose two series, New Europe (1986–1992) and A Shimmer of Possibility (2004–2006). Accompanying an exhibition at the Fundación Botín in 2011/2012 curated by Vicente Todolí.
- Films. London: Mack, 2011. ISBN 978-1907946028.
- The Present. London: Mack, 2012. ISBN 978-1907946189.
- 1981 & 2011. Gothenburg, Sweden: Hasselblad Foundation; London: Mack, 2012. ISBN 978-1-907946-33-2. Produced in conjunction with his receiving the Hasselblad Award and an exhibition. Edited by Graham in collaboration with Dragana Vujanovic and Louise Wolthers from The Hasselblad Foundation and with a text by David Campany, "Noticing". Said to unite A1 – The Great North Road (1981) and The Present (2011).
- Does Yellow Run Forever?. London: Mack, 2014. ISBN 978-1910164068.
- The Whitness of the Whale. London: Mack; San Francisco, Pier 24 Photography, 2015. ISBN 978-1-91016-432-7. Exhibition catalogue. Includes American Night, A Shimmer of Possibility and The Present. With texts by David Chandler and Stanley Wolukau-Wanambwa.
- Paris 11~15th November 2015. London: Mack, 2016. ISBN 978-1-910164-64-8.
- Mother. London: Mack, 2019. ISBN 978-1-912339-45-7.
- Verdigris/Ambergris London: Mack, 2024. ISBN 978-1-915743-43-5. Two volumes in slip case.

=== Books edited by Graham ===
- But Still, it Turns. London: Mack, 2021. ISBN 978-1-912339-95-2. Includes work from Gregory Halpern's ZZYZX; Vanessa Winship's She Dances on Jackson, Curran Hatleberg's Lost Coast, Stanley Wolukau-Wanambwa's One Wall a Web, Richard Choi's What Remains, RaMell Ross' South County, Emanuele Bruti and Piergiorgio Casotti's collaborative Index G, and Kristine Potter's Manifest. With essays by Graham, Rebecca Bengal, RaMell Ross, and Ian Penman. Published in conjunction with an exhibition at the International Center of Photography, New York, 2021.

== Exhibitions ==
=== Solo and group exhibitions ===
- Troubled Land; within The New British Document (also with Keith Arnatt, John Davies, Peter Fraser and Martin Parr, curated by Sally Eauclaire), Museum of Contemporary Photography, Columbia College Chicago, May–June 1986.
- Conflits en Irlande du Nord, Rencontres d'Arles, Arles, France, 1987.
- New Europe, Fotomuseum Winterthur, 1993.
- Empty Heaven, Kunstmuseum Wolfsburg, 1995.
- Hypermetropia, Tate Gallery, London, 1996.
- End of an Age, Portfolio Gallery, Edinburgh, 1998; Galerie Bob Van Orsouw, Zurich, 1998.
- Cruel and Tender, Tate, London, 2003. Group survey exhibition of 20th century photography.
- American Night, Anthony Reynolds Gallery, London, 2003; Power House, Memphis, TN, 2003; PS1, New York, 2003.
- American Pictures, Whitney Museum of American Art, New York City, 2004.
- American Night, Rencontres d'Arles, Arles, France, 2006; La Fábrica, Madrid, 2006.
- Click Double Click, The Documentary Factor, Haus der Kunst, Munich, 2006; Centre for Fine Arts, Brussels, 2006
- A Shimmer of Possibility, La Fábrica, Madrid, 2008; Museum of Modern Art, New York City, 2009.
- Paul Graham. Photographs 1981–2006, Museum Folkwang, Essen, Germany, 2009; Deichtorhallen, Hamburg, Germany, 2010; Whitechapel Gallery, London, 2011.
- The Whiteness of the Whale, Pier 24 Photography, San Francisco, August 2015 – February 2016; and toured to the High Museum of Art, Atlanta; Bombas Gens in Valencia; and Rencontres d'Arles, France.

=== Exhibitions curated by Graham ===
- But Still, it Turns, International Center of Photography, New York, 2021. Includes work by Gregory Halpern, Vanessa Winship, Curran Hatleberg, Stanley Wolukau-Wanambwa, Richard Choi, RaMell Ross, Kristine Potter, and Emanuele Bruti and Piergiorgio Casotti.

== Awards ==
- 1983: Winston Churchill Memorial Trusts fellowship.
- 1988: W. Eugene Smith Grant from the W. Eugene Smith Memorial Fund.
- 2009: Deutsche Börse Photography Prize.
- 2009: Honorary Fellowship of the Royal Photographic Society
- 2010: Guggenheim Fellowship from the John Simon Guggenheim Memorial Foundation.
- 2011: Best photographic book of the past 15 years for Shimmer of Possibility, awarded by Paris Photo as a precursor to the Paris Photo–Aperture Foundation PhotoBook Awards, presented in The PhotoBook Review.
- 2012: Hasselblad Award from the Hasselblad Foundation, Gothenburg, Sweden.

== Collections ==
Graham's work is held in the following public collections:

- Arts Council Collection, UK
- British Council, London
- Det Kongelige Bibliotek, Copenhagen
- European Parliament, Brussels
- Fotomuseum Winterthur, Winterthur
- Solomon R. Guggenheim Museum, New York City
- Kunstmuseum Wolfsburg, Wolfsburg
- Metropolitan Museum of Art, New York City
- Museo de Arte Contemporáneo de Castilla y León, León
- Museum of Modern Art, New York City
- National Museum of Photography, Film and Television, Bradford, UK
- Saint Louis Art Museum, MO
- Tate Gallery, London
- Victoria & Albert Museum, London
- Winnipeg Art Gallery, Winnipeg, Manitoba
- Whitney Museum of Art, New York City
