= Matt Black (photographer) =

American documentary photographer

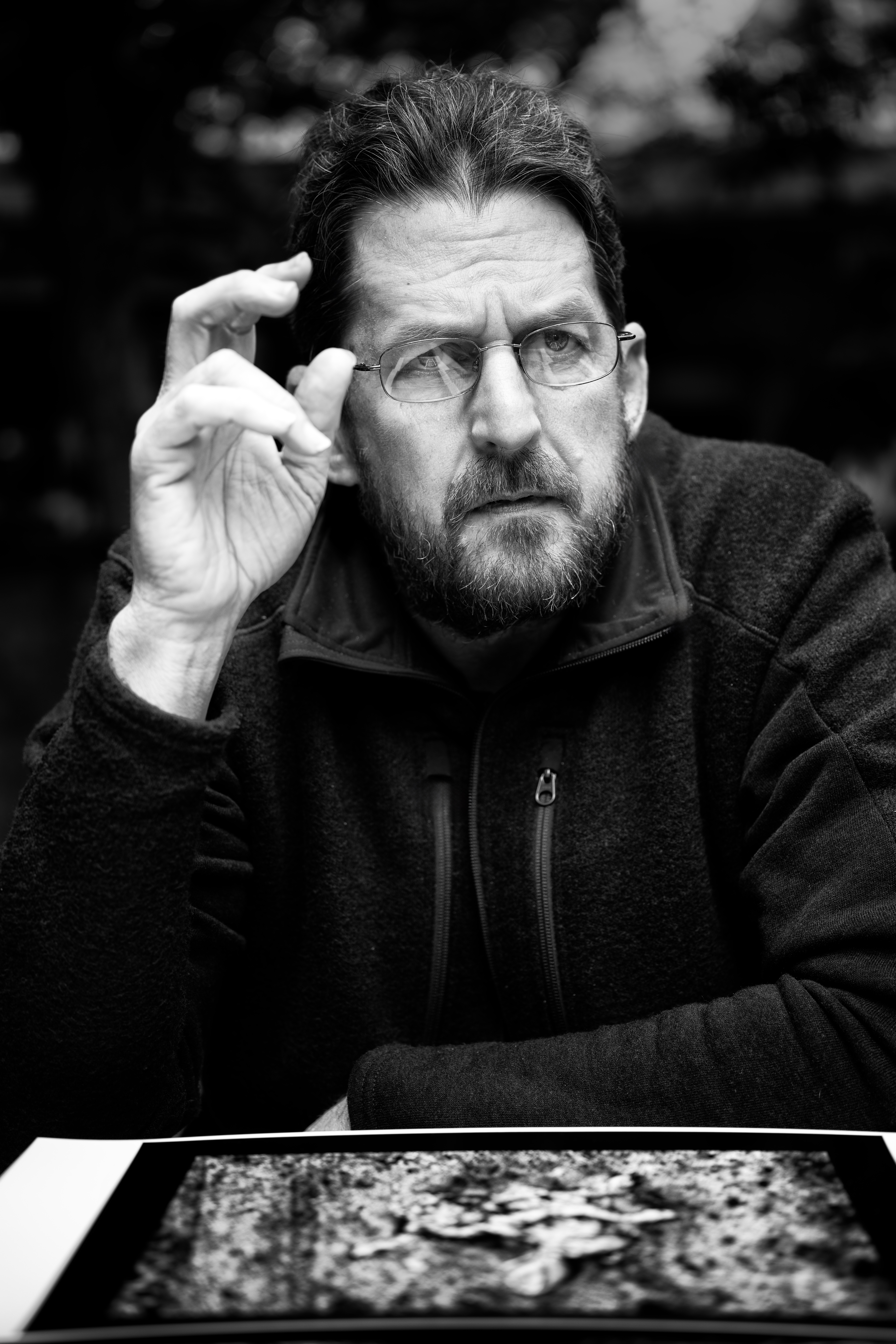
- Black in 2025
- Born: 1970 (age 55–56); Santa Maria, California, U.S.
- Education: BA, Latin American History, San Francisco State University
- Occupation: Photographer
- Awards: First prize, Daily Life category, World Press Photo Award; Robert F. Kennedy Award for Excellence in Journalism; W. Eugene Smith Grant.
- Website: mattblack.com

Matt Black (born 1970) is an American documentary photographer whose work has focused on issues of poverty, migration, and the environment. He is a full member of Magnum Photos. Black's first book, American Geography, was published in 2021 and was exhibited at Deichtorhallen in Hamburg, Germany.

== Life and work ==
Black was born in 1970 in Santa Maria, California. He grew up in the town of Visalia, in California's agricultural Central Valley. While attending high school, he worked as a photographer at the Tulare Advance-Register, later the Visalia Times-Delta, where he learned the black and white photojournalism style he has used throughout his career. He received a B.A. in Latin American History from San Francisco State University in 1995.

In the early 1990s, Black made several trips to Latin America, making work that in 1993 gained first prize in the Daily Life category of the World Press Photo Award. His 1996 article, "Homage to an Outlaw", published by West Magazine, marked the beginning of his long form photojournalism focusing on rural life in the Central Valley.

Other major projects in the Central Valley include The Black Okies, for which he was named a finalist for the Pulitzer Prize in 2003 and From Dust to Dust, about indigenous Mexican migrants in California, for which he received the Robert F. Kennedy Award for Excellence in Journalism, Domestic Photography category, in 2007.

In 1999, while working on a story about widespread unemployment in the Central Valley in the aftermath of a citrus freeze, Black met a family from Oaxaca, Mexico, which introduced him to the story of indigenous Mixtec migrants. The following year, he travelled to the Mixteca region of southern Mexico, beginning his project The People of Clouds. Again working in the extended photo-essay form, major stories from this project include The Face of the Mountain, After the Fall and The Monster in the Mountains.

In 2014, he began the project The Geography of Poverty, combining geotagged photographs with census data to map and document poor communities. In the summer of 2015, he completed a thirty-state trip photographing seventy of America's poorest places.

In addition to still photography, Black has completed several short documentary films, including After the Fall, Harvest of Shadows, California Paradise Burning and The Monster in the Mountains.

In June 2015 he became a nominee member of Magnum Photos, later an associate member and in 2019 a full member.

He is represented by the Robert Koch Gallery in San Francisco, California.

== Publications ==
- American Geography: A Reckoning with a Dream. Thames and Hudson, 2021. ISBN 978-0500545355.
- American Artifacts. Thames and Hudson, 2024. ISBN 978-0500027752.

== Awards ==
- 1994: First prize, Daily Life category, World Press Photo Award from World Press Photo, Amsterdam, Netherlands
- 2007: Robert F. Kennedy Award for Excellence in Journalism from Robert F. Kennedy Center for Justice and Human Rights
- 2014: Time's Instagram Photographer of the Year 2014
- 2015: W. Eugene Smith Grant from the W. Eugene Smith Memorial Fund
- 2015: Gerald Loab Award shared with Tom Philpott for the feature article "California Goes Nuts" in Mother Jones
- 2025: Black was awarded a MacArthur Foundation Fellowship, popularly known as the MacArthur Foundation's "Genius Award."

== Exhibitions ==
=== Solo exhibitions ===
- Matt Black: American Geography, Deichtorhallen, Hamburg, Germany, 2020/21

=== Exhibitions with others ===
- Milk Gallery, New York City, 2016. Photographs by Black, Carolyn Drake, Sohrab Hura, Lorenzo Meloni, Max Pinckers, and Newsha Tavakolian.
