= Photo London =

Annual photography event

Coordinates: 51.5114°N 0.1174°W

Photo London is an annual photography event held at Somerset House in London in May. Galleries and publishers show and sell work by photographers, and there are curated exhibitions and talks. Awards are also given.

It was established in 2004 and ran until 2006 at the Royal Academy of Arts, then at Old Billingsgate in 2007, then stopped. It was relaunched in 2015 and has since been held at Somerset House. That year, Photo London attracted 20,000 visitors, presenting 70 galleries from over 20 countries.

== Details ==
Photo London was established in 2004 by Daniel Newburg and held at the Royal Academy of Arts in 2004, 2005 and 2006. In November 2006 it was purchased by Reed Exhibitions (who also owned Paris Photo). Reed ran it, with Newburg acting as creative director, in 2007 at Old Billingsgate and then stopped. Photo London was re-launched in 2015 by a company Candlestar, led by Michael Benson and Fariba Farshad. It took place from 9 to 12 September 2021.

At Photo London, galleries and publishers show and sell work by photographers, and there are curated exhibitions and talks.

== Awards ==
The following awards are given as part of Photo London:

- Kraszna-Krausz Book Awards
- La Fabrica Book Dummy Award
- Mack First Book Award
- Magnum Photos Graduate Photographers Award
- Photo London Master of Photography Award
  - 2015: Sebastião Salgado
  - 2016: Don McCullin
  - 2017: Taryn Simon
  - 2018: Edward Burtynsky
  - 2019: Stephen Shore
  - 2020/2021: Shirin Neshat
  - 2022: Nick Knight
  - 2023: Martin Parr
- Photo London Artproof Award

== Simultaneous events ==
Other photography events held at the same time in London include the Prix Pictet exhibition at the Victoria and Albert Museum, the Deutsche Börse Photography Prize exhibition at The Photographers' Gallery, the Peckham 24 photography festival in south-east London, and Offprint, an independent photobook publishers' fair at Tate Modern.

== See also ==
- Brighton Photo Biennial
- Paris Photo
