= Buck Ellison =

American artist

- Born: 1987 (age 38–39); San Francisco, California, U.S.
- Education: Columbia University (BA); Städelschule (MFA)
- Known for: Visual arts, Photography
- Notable work: Living Trust
- Awards: Paris Photo–Aperture Best PhotoBook Award (2020)
- Website: buckellison.com

Buck Ellison (born 1987) is an American visual artist, known for his conceptual photography. Through collages, films, and photographs, he interrogates the methods through which whiteness and privilege are sustained and broadcast. He lives and works in Los Angeles.

== Early life and education ==
Buck Ellison was born in San Francisco, California, in 1987 and grew up in Marin County. He attended Marin Academy, an independent college-preparatory school in San Rafael. Ellison has said that growing up within one of the wealthiest communities in the United States later became central to his artistic practice, explaining that he "wouldn't be able to make [his] critiques" without having been raised in the social world his photographs examine.

Ellison studied German Literature at Columbia University, graduating in 2010. He then received an MFA degree from the Städelschule in Frankfurt am Main in 2014, studying in the class of Willem de Rooij. His fellow students included Anne Imhof, Julien Nguyen, and Evelyn Taocheng Wang.

== Career ==
Ellison's first monograph, Living Trust, won the Paris Photo-Aperture Best PhotoBook Award 2020.

Ellison has been the subject of long-form profiles in The New York Times, The New Yorker, and the Financial Times His work has also been reviewed in Aperture, Artforum, ArtReview, British Journal of Photography, Flash Art, Frieze, L'Uomo Vogue, Mousse, and Texte zur Kunst.

== Exhibitions ==
- Gag, George Eastman Museum, Rochester, 2026
- Genuine Fake Premium Economy, Institute of Contemporary Arts, London, 2026 (three-person exhibition with filmmaker Jenna Bliss and painter Jasmine Gregory)
- Get in the Game: Sports, Art, Culture, San Francisco Museum of Modern Art, 2024–2025 (traveled to Pérez Art Museum Miami and Crystal Bridges Museum of American Art, Bentonville, 2026)
- Queer Lens: A History of Photography, The Getty Museum, Los Angeles, 2025
- Post Scriptum. A Museum Forgotten by Heart, Museum of Contemporary Art of Rome, 2024–2025
- Burning Down the House: Rethinking Family, Kunstmuseum St. Gallen, 2024
- Little Brother, Luhring Augustine, New York, 2023 (solo exhibition)
- Whitney Biennial 2022: Quiet as It's Kept, Whitney Museum of American Art, New York, 2022
- 16th Biennale de Lyon: manifesto of fragility, Musée d'art contemporain de Lyon, 2022
- Made in L.A. 2020: a version, The Hammer Museum, Los Angeles; The Huntington Library, Art Museum, and Botanical Gardens, Pasadena, 2020
- Antarctica, Kunsthalle Wien, Vienna, 2018
- The Sun Placed In The Abyss, Columbus Museum of Art, Columbus, 2016

== Collections ==
Ellison's work is held in the permanent collections of major institutions worldwide, including:

- Aïshti Foundation, Beirut
- Carnegie Museum of Art, Pittsburgh
- Hammer Museum, Los Angeles
- Los Angeles County Museum of Art, Los Angeles
- Museum of Contemporary Art, Los Angeles
- Princeton University Art Museum, Princeton
- Whitney Museum of American Art, New York

== Awards and recognition ==
- Paris Photo-Aperture Foundation PhotoBook Award, first PhotoBook winner (2020)

== Bibliography ==
- Abudu, KJ (April 25, 2023). "Photography Report: Imaging Racial Capital". e-flux.
- Diehl, Travis (June 24, 2022). "Buck Ellison's Great White Society". The New York Times.
- Ellison, Buck (2020). Living Trust. Loose Joints. ISBN 978-1-912719-17-4. (monograph)
- Glass, Joshua (March 21, 2023). "Can Buck Ellison Make You Care About Erik Prince?". Cultured Magazine.
- Griffin, Jonathan (June 9, 2022). "Buck Ellison's American Freaks". ArtReview.
- Packard, Cassie (April 24, 2023). "Buck Ellison Meets Prince". ArtReview.
