= Max Pinckers =

Belgian photographer (born 1988)

Max Pinckers (born 1988) is a Belgian photographer based in Brussels.

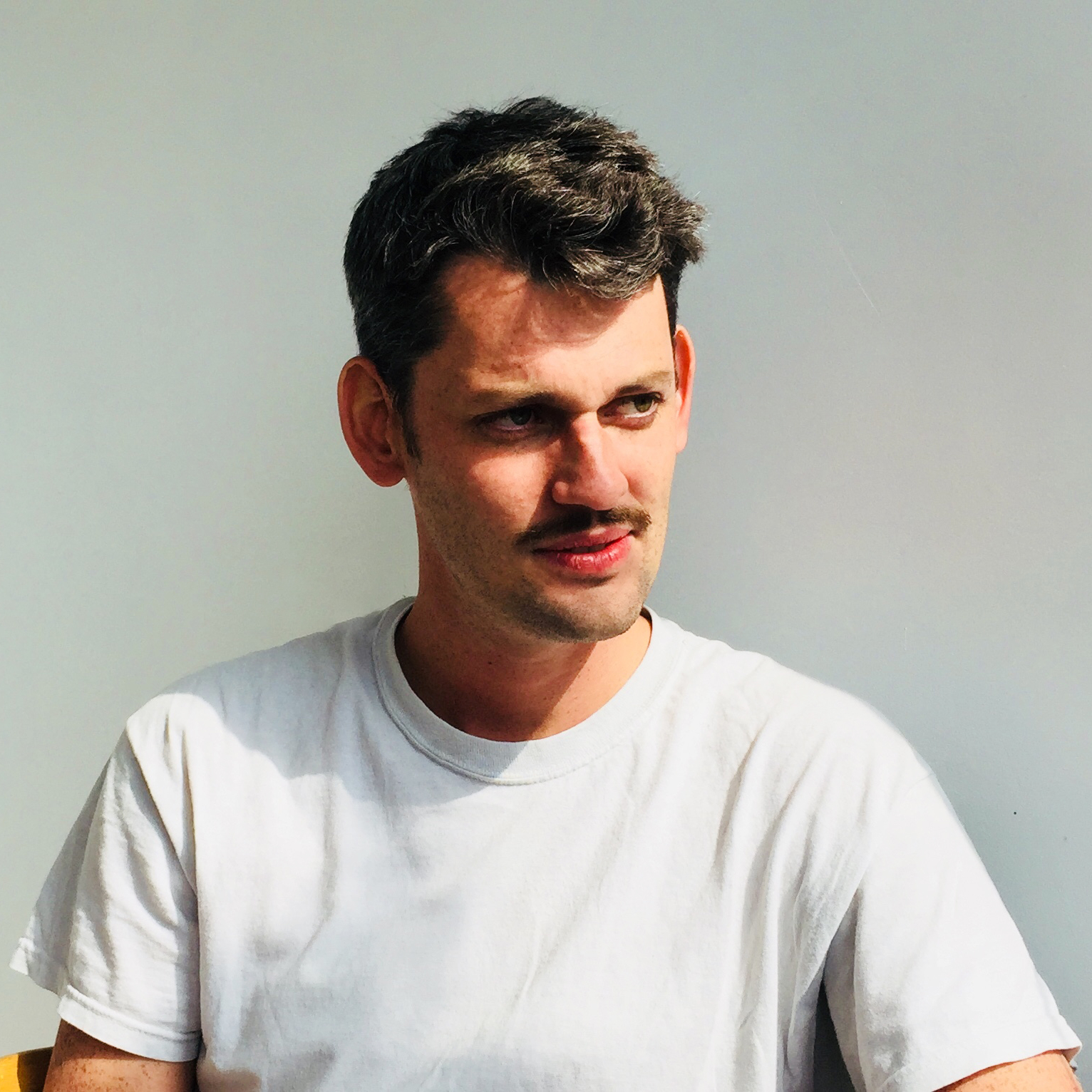
Pinckers in 2018

He has self-published the books The Fourth Wall (2012); Will They Sing Like Raindrops or Leave Me Thirsty (2014), which won a Photographic Museum of Humanity grant); and Red Ink (2018), which won the Leica Oskar Barnack Award. Pinckers has also won the Edward Steichen Award Laureate.

== Life and work ==
Pinckers was born in 1988 in Brussels, Belgium. He gained a BA (2008–2010) and a MFA (2010–2012) in photography at the Royal Academy of Fine Arts (KASK) in Ghent, Belgium. From 2015 to 2017 he was a nominee member of Magnum Photos before leaving the agency.

His work often takes the position of challenging preconceptions of documentation and is intended to instill skepticism in the viewer. In an interview about his collaborative artwork Trophy Camera, he said, "We all are still made to feel that we are in control somehow of the image-making process, but this is something that's very much diminishing."

Sean O'Hagan, writing in The Guardian, has described the format of Pinckers' second book, Will They Sing Like Raindrops or Leave Me Thirsty (2014) as "sitting between conceptual and documentary, while upending expectations of each" as it "mixes documentary photography with staged scenes reminiscent of Bollywood movies." O'Hagan summarised the book's subject matter as "central to this rich visual narrative is a series of photographs of a four-man activist organisation called the Love Commandos. Based in Delhi, they operate on a shoestring from their small, cluttered office, manning a telephone helpline and website to provide advice and support – including safe rooms and shelters across India – for runaway couples who have fallen in love across the boundaries of caste or religion. The commandos have even sent out teams to rescue young people at risk of violence."

== Publications ==
=== Publications by Pinckers ===
- The Fourth Wall. Self-published, 2012. ISBN 978-9-0819-7150-8. Edition of 1000 copies.
- Will They Sing Like Raindrops or Leave Me Thirsty. Self-published, 2014. ISBN 9789081971515. With a text by Hans Theys, "Photographs as Poems". Edition of 1000 copies. Commissioned by Europalia International Arts Festival for the Indomania exhibition at Bozar - Centre of Fine Arts, Brussels, 2013.
- Margins Of Excess. Self-published, 2018. Edition of 1500 copies.
- Red Ink. Self-published, 2018. Edition of 850 copies.

=== Publications paired with others ===
- Controversy. Brussels: Lyre Press, 2017. With Sam Weerdmeester. ISBN 9789082465532. With texts by Lars Kwakkenbos, J.M. Susperregui and Hans Durrer.
- Lotus. By Pinckers and Quinten De Bruyn.
  - Self-published, 2011. With text by Hans Theys, "Our Ladies of the Flowers". Edition of 40 copies.
  - Brussels: Lyre Press, 2016. ISBN 9789082465518. Edition of 3000 copies. With text by Hans Theys, "Our Ladies of the Flowers" (revised for the 2016 edition).
- Mamihlapinatapai. Self-published, 2012. By Pinckers and Michiel Burger. With a text by Laura van Grinsven, "Exchanging Gazes". Edition of 1200 copies. Produced on the occasion of the exhibition Mamihlapinatapai: A look shared by two people, each wishing that the other will initiate something that both desire but which neither one wants to start, Flemish Arts Centre De Brakke Grond, The Netherlands, October 2012.
- Floating Worlds. Brussels: Lyre Press; Bolzano, Italy: Rorhof, 2016. With Daisuke Yokota. ISBN 9788890981791. With a text by Colin Pantall. A catalogue of an exhibition curated by Nicolò Degiorgis at Foto-Forum Gallery, Bolzano, Italy, May 2016. The book includes Yokota's "Linger" and Pinckers' "Two Kinds of Memory and Memory Itself."

=== Publications with contributions by Pinckers ===
- The World Atlas of Street Photography. New Haven and London: Yale University Press, 2014. ISBN 978-0-300-20716-3. Edited by Jackie Higgins. With a foreword by Max Kozloff.

== Selected exhibitions with others or during festivals ==
- The Struggle for Freedom in: ________, Lagos Photo Festival 2015, Lagos, Nigeria, October–November 2015. Pair exhibition with Michiel Burger.
- Picture This: Contemporary Photography and India, Philadelphia Museum of Art, Philadelphia, USA, December 2015 – April 2016. Photographs by Pinckers, Gauri Gill, Sunil Gupta, and Pamela Singh.

== Awards ==
- 2013: One of the British Journal of Photography's 'Ones To Watch'
- 2013: Shortlisted, First PhotoBook category, Paris Photo–Aperture Foundation PhotoBook Awards, for The Fourth Wall
- 2014: Runner-up, Aperture Portfolio Prize, for Will They Sing Like Raindrops or Leave Me Thirsty
- 2014: First prize, Photographic Museum of Humanity 2014 grant, Buenos Aires, Argentina. A prize of $2000 for Will They Sing Like Raindrops or Leave Me Thirsty.
- 2015: Shortlisted for the Anamorphosis Prize, USA, for Will They Sing Like Raindrops or Leave Me Thirsty
- 2015: Edward Steichen Award Laureate, Luxembourg
- 2018: Leica Oskar Barnack Award for his series "Red Ink", made in 2017 in North Korea for The New Yorker.

== Collections ==
Pinckers' work is held in the following public collections:

- Fotomuseum Antwerp (FOMU), Antwerp, Belgium
- Fotomuseum Winterthur, Winterthur, Switzerland: prints of The Fourth Wall
- Huis Marseille, Museum for Photography, Amsterdam, Netherlands: 2 prints (as of May 2018)

== See also ==
- Love Commandos
