= Sohrab Hura =

Indian photographer

Sohrab Hura (born 17 October 1981) is an Indian photographer based in New Delhi. He is a full member of Magnum Photos.

Hura's self-published trilogy Sweet Life comprises the books Life is Elsewhere (2015), A Proposition for Departure (2017) and Look It's Getting Sunny Outside!!! (2018); the latter was shortlisted for Photobook of the Year in the Paris Photo–Aperture Foundation PhotoBook Awards. He has also self-published The Coast (2019) and The Levee (2020). His work has been shown in solo exhibitions in London and in Kolkata, India.

== Life and work ==
Hura was born in Chinsurah, West Bengal. He attended The Doon School in Dehradun, Uttarakhand and has a masters in economics from the Delhi School of Economics. He began making photographs during college with a Nikon FM10 given to him by his father. He is now based in New Delhi, India.

Hura's Sweet Life trilogy of books focuses on his relationship with his mother, who was diagnosed with paranoid schizophrenia in 1999, when he was 17 years old. The trilogy's Life Is Elsewhere was made between 2005 and 2011, and Look It's Getting Sunny Outside!!! was made between 2008 and 2014.

In 2011 the British Journal of Photography included Hura in its Ones to Watch. He became a nominee member of Magnum Photos in 2014 (the second Indian photographer to become a nominee member) an Associate member in 2018, and a full member in 2020. Sean O'Hagan, writing in The Guardian, included Hura's The Lost Head and the Bird exhibition in his "The top 10 photography exhibitions of 2017".

== Publications ==
- Life is Elsewhere. New Delhi: self-published (Ugly Dog), 2015. ISBN 978-93-5196-415-5. Edition of 600 copies.
- A Proposition For Departure. New Delhi: self-published (Ugly Dog), 2017. Includes "8 Sound Extraction charts, 1 Music Chart for the three movement sound piece". Edition of 600 copies.
- Look It's Getting Sunny Outside!!!. New Delhi: self-published (Ugly Dog), 2018. ISBN 978-93-5279-336-5. Includes a hand written text by Hura's mother. Edition of 600 copies.
- The Coast: Twelve Parallel Short Stories. New Delhi: self-published (Ugly Dog), 2019. Edition of 1200 copies.
- The Levee. New Delhi: self-published (Ugly Dog), 2020. Edition of 600 copies.

== Exhibitions ==
=== Solo exhibitions ===
- Destination Tsunami: Stories and Struggles from India's Southern Coast, The Guardian Gallery, Kings Place, London, 2010.
- Sweet Life, Experimenter Gallery, Kolkata, India, 2017.
- Sohrab Hura: Mother, MoMA PS1, New York, 10 October 2024–17 February 2025. First survey show in the United States.

=== Group exhibitions and during festivals ===
- Life is Elsewhere, Angkor Photo, Siem Reap, Cambodia, 2014.
- Milk Gallery, New York City, 2016. Photographs by Hura and Matt Black, Carolyn Drake, Lorenzo Meloni, Max Pinckers, and Newsha Tavakolian.
- The Lost Head and the Bird, The Nines, Peckham 24, London, 2017. Video installation.
- India: Contemporary Photographic and New Media Art, Fotofest 2018 Biennial, Houston, 2018.
- Format International Photography Festival, Derby, UK, 2017.

== Awards ==
- 2018: Shortlisted, Photobook of the Year, Paris Photo–Aperture Foundation PhotoBook Awards for Look It's Getting Sunny Outside!!!
