= 10x10 Photobooks =

10x10 Photobooks is a non-profit organization founded to "foster engagement with the global photobook community through an appreciation, dissemination and understanding of photobooks." Founded in 2012, 10x10 is a presenter of public photobook events, including reading rooms, salons, and online communities, as well as a publisher of art catalogs representing the photobook medium. "Photo books are now recognized as a separate art form, a subgenre of the larger universe of photography, and their importance has prompted a recent spate of books about photo books.""10×10 was inspired in part by lack of direct access for the general public to many of these books, some of which were published decades ago in limited editions." They organize public events in the form of salons and "reading rooms" — touring interactive exhibitions of photobooks that invite viewers to sit and leaf through a curated selection of works. In addition to this public programming, 10x10 publishes their own books based on specific themes that coincide with their major reading rooms.

== History ==
10x10 Photobooks was co-founded by Russet Lederman, Olga Yatskevich and Matthew Carson (emeritus) in 2012, with David Solo joining as Grants Director in 2021 and Karen Kertesz-Sklar as Salon Manager in 2024 .

Lederman is a writer, editor and photobook collector in New York City and teaches art writing at the School of Visual Arts in New York. She writes on photobooks for print and online journals, including Foam Magazine (affiliated with Foam Fotografiemuseum Amsterdam), The Eyes, IMA, Aperture and the International Center of Photography's library blog. She also co-edits The Gould Collection, lectures internationally on photobooks, and has received awards and grants from Prix Ars Electronica and the Smithsonian American Art museum. Yatskevich is a photobook collector based in New York and contributing writer for Collector Daily, a platform that offers photography criticism from a collector's perspective.

What They Saw: Historical Photobooks by Women, 1843–1999 (2021) won the Photography Catalogue of the Year category in the 2021 Paris Photo-Aperture Foundation PhotoBook Award and the 2022 Kraszna-Krausz Book Award

== Reading rooms ==
One of 10x10's major activities is the sponsorship of public reading rooms in which attendees are invited to sit and browse through a curated selection of works.

=== 10x10 Japanese Photobooks (2012) ===
A pop-up reading room called "10x10 Japanese Photobooks" was presented at the International Center of Photography during the New York Art Book Fair consisting of 100 books selected by 10 experts. "I think the visitors are the value of the reading room," Yoko Sawada, the principal of the Tokyo-based publishing house Osiris and one of the "10x10" specialists said in an interview. It then traveled to the PGH Photo Fair in Pittsburgh at the Carnegie Museum of Art.

=== 10x10 American Photobooks (2013) ===
A pop-up reading room called "10x10 American Photobooks" was presented at the Tokyo Metropolitan Museum of Photography September 11-October 6, 2013. Again, the project included 100 books selected by 10 experts, as well as a catalog.

=== CLAP!—10x10 Contemporary Latin American Photobooks (2018) ===
Organized by 10×10 Photobooks, the project launched at the Carnegie Museum of Art in Pittsburgh in May 2016, and traveled to the Aperture Foundation in New York City in November 2016, before concluding at the Museum of Fine Arts, Houston in March 2017. CLAP!, a pop-up reading room, presented 130 contemporary Latin American photobooks from 2000 to 2016, representing a range of exciting innovations in Latin American photography and publication practice. Selected by twelve Latin American specialists, the reading room was a hands-on opportunity for North American audiences to browse a range of recently published books from Latin America that are rarely seen or available in the U.S.

=== How We See: Photobooks by Women (2018) ===
How We See: Photobooks by Women was a hands-on touring reading room, publication and series of public events featuring a range of one hundred 21st-century photobooks by women photographers. "In this new photobook anthology and touring exhibition, women take center stage in a tradition that has historically ignored their importance."

The touring reading room was developed after 10x10 collaborators investigated the history of women's contributions to photobooks and their own publishing practices. For example, historical records establish Anna Atkins's Photographs of British Algae: Cyanotype Impressions (1843–1853) as the first photobook. However, when analyzing recent publishing and award patterns, "Lederman and her colleagues, co-founder Olga Yatskevich and director Michael Lang, found that between 2013 and 2017, 40% of the shortlisted photobooks for first book and dummy awards were by women. But when they looked at the shortlists for best book, author, or annual photobook of the year prizes, they found that it dropped to 23%. What’s more, during the same period of time, photobooks by women made up only 10.5% of the entries in the six major "book-on-books" anthologies, and in the online inventory of major photobook sellers, only 16% of the available titles were by women."

The accompanying catalog was published in mid-November 2018 with a second printing in February 2019. The publication includes the one hundred photobooks in the reading room, and is supplemented with an additional 100 historical books by women photographers, an annotated history and essays by photographer Ishiuchi Miyako; Magnum Foundation Executive Director, Kristen Lubben and Valentina Abenavoli of Akina Books. How We See : Photobooks by Women received the 2018 AIGA 50 books | 50 Covers Award. and was shortlisted for the Arles Rencontres del la Photographie 2019 Historical Books award.

=== What They Saw: Historical Photobooks by Women, 1843-1999 (2021) ===
What They Saw: Historical Photobooks by Women, 1843-1999 is a touring reading room launched in May 2022 at The New York Public Library, award-winning publication and series of public events that "sheds light on compilations created by women from diverse backgrounds, and addresses the lack of access, support and funding for women of color. It is illustrated with photographs of classic bound titles, portfolios, personal albums, unpublished books, zines and scrapbooks, ranging from well-known publications to the more obscure. The associated publication won the Paris Photo-Aperture Foundation Catalogue of the Year Award and the Kraszna-Krausz Photography Book Award" What They Saw: Historical Photobooks by Women, 1843-1999 was named one of Time Magazines best photobooks of 2021. The What They Saw Reading Room toured to: Enter Enter and the Rijksmuseum in Amsterdam, Boston Athenaeum, Museo Nacional Centro de Arte Reina Sofia in Madrid and The Getty Museum in Los Angeles.

"'There are other books of books, delimited by specific geographic areas or themes,' Yatskevich points out. 'In all of them, the reduced space dedicated to publications signed by women was manifest. This was the data that gave way to our first project: How We See. Photobooks by Women, published in 2018, for which ten curators chose and wrote about 10 women's photobooks. From there we launched this latest publication, in which we have tried to bring to light books that had been relegated to oblivion.'"

=== Flashpoint! Protest Photography in Print, 1950-Present (2024) ===
Flashpoint! was a reading room exhibition focused on protest photography. The associated publication was shortlisted for the Paris Photo-Aperture Foundation Catalogue of the Year Award.

== Publications ==
- 10×10 American Photobooks (2013)
- 10×10 Japanese Photobooks (2014)
- CLAP! 10×10 Contemporary Latin American Photobooks (2017)
- How We See: Photobooks by Women (2018)
- What They Saw: Historical Photobooks by Women, 1843–1999 (Nov, 2021)
- Flashpoint! Protest Photography in Print, 1950-Present (Nov, 2024)
