= Stanley Wolukau-Wanambwa =

British photographer, writer, and educator

Stanley Wolukau-Wanambwa (born 1980) is a Ugandan-born British photographer, writer, and educator, living in the USA. His series One Wall a Web has been shown in a solo exhibition at Light Work in New York and the book of the work won the Paris Photo-Aperture Foundation PhotoBook Award's First PhotoBook Award.

== Life and work ==
Wolukau-Wanambwa was born in Uganda and grew up in the UK. He obtained a BA in Philosophy and French from the University of Oxford, UK and an MFA in Photography from Virginia Commonwealth University.

He has lived in the USA since 2012 and as of 2021 was living in Rhode Island. He has lectured at Yale University, Cornell University, New York University, The New School, and State University of New York at Purchase; and been director of the photography MFA at Rhode Island School of Design.

The book One Wall a Web (2018) includes two photographic series made by Wolukau-Wanambwa in the USA—Our Present Invention (2012–2014) and All My Gone Life (2014–2017)—as well as an extensive essay and appropriated archival images. It "draws together poetry, critical writing, and photography to reflect on the ways that race, gender, and violence are woven into the fabric of (white) Western modernity. Set in America – with its history of injustice and its troubled present – One Wall a Web asks how documentary photography both participates in this complex play of forces, and suggests ways that we might find alternative pathways through it."

== Publications ==
=== Books by Wolukau-Wanambwa ===
- One Wall A Web. Amsterdam: Roma, 2018. ISBN 978-9492811226. Photographs and an essay by Wolukau-Wanambwa as well as appropriated archival images.
- Hiding in Plain Sight. Harun Farocki Institute; Motto, 2020. Co-authored with Ben Alper. ISBN 978-2940672073.
- The Lives of Images, Vol. 1: Repetition, Reproduction, and Circulation. Aperture Reader Series. New York: Aperture, 2021. Edited by Wolukau-Wanambwa. ISBN 9781597115025.
- Dark Mirrors. London: Mack, 2021. ISBN 978-1-913620-39-4. Sixteen essays by Wolukau-Wanambwa on Deana Lawson, Dana Lixenberg, Paul Pfeiffer, Arthur Jafa, Katy Grannan, Jason Koxvold, Robert Bergman and others.

=== Books with contributions by Wolukau-Wanambwa ===
- Knives, Jason Koxvold. New York: Gnomic Book, 2017. ISBN 978-0998518022.
- The Image of Whiteness: Contemporary Photography and Racialization. London: Self Publish, Be Happy, 2019. Edited by Daniel C. Blight. ISBN 978-1999814496.
- But Still, It Turns. Edited by Paul Graham. London: Mack, 2021. ISBN 978-1-912339-95-2. Published in conjunction with an exhibition at the International Center of Photography, New York, 2021.

== Awards ==
- Winner, First PhotoBook Award, Paris Photo-Aperture Foundation PhotoBook Award for One Wall a Web

== Exhibitions ==
=== Solo exhibitions ===
- One Wall a Web, Light Work, Syracuse, New York.

=== Group exhibitions ===
- Greater New York, MoMA PS1, New York, 2020/21
- But Still, It Turns: Recent Photography from the World, International Center of Photography, New York, 2021. Curated by Paul Graham.
