= Nicolò Degiorgis =

Italian photographer

Nicolò Degiorgis (born 1985) is an Italian visual artist, publisher, photographer, and curator. He runs Rorhof, an independent publishing house in Bolzano, Italy. He has self-published a number of books, including Hidden Islam (2014). Hidden Islam won the First PhotoBook award at the Paris Photo–Aperture Foundation PhotoBook Awards, the Author Book Award at Rencontres d'Arles, and was a gold winner of the Deutscher Fotobuchpreis.

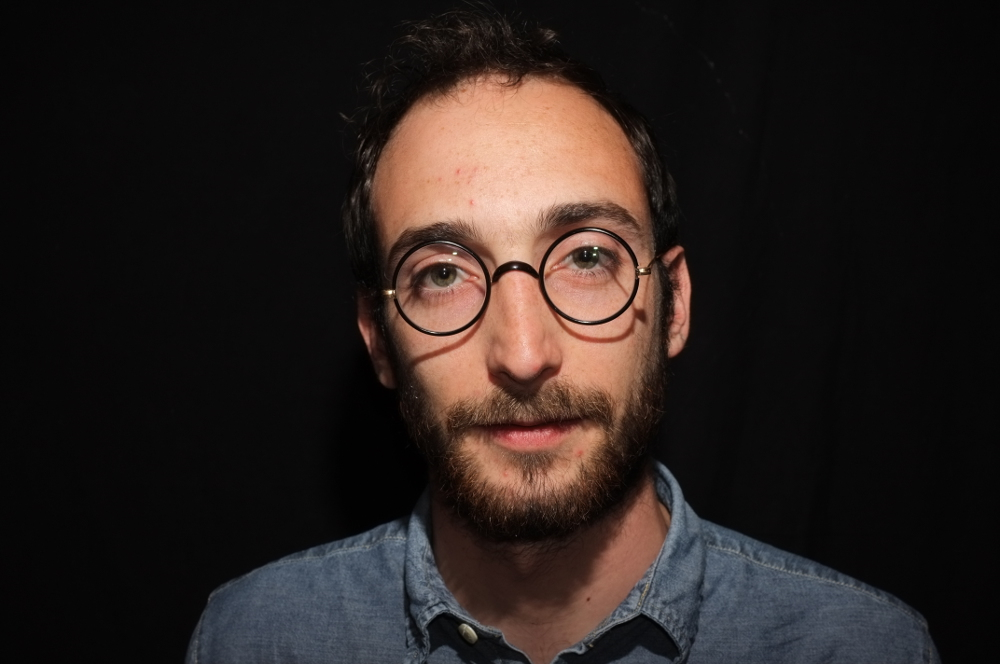
Degiorgis in 2014

== Early life and education ==
Degiorgis was born in Bolzano, South Tyrol, northern Italy.

He earned a BA in sinology from the Ca' Foscari University of Venice (2006–2008). He studied political science at the University of Trieste (2009–2010) and at Leiden University (2019).

== Life and work ==
Hidden Islam (2014) documents the struggles of Muslims living in an Islamophobic environment in Italy between 2009 and 2013, where 1.35 million of them had only eight official mosques. Degiorgis photographed the makeshift buildings where Muslims practiced their religion and prayed. The photographs are categorised into two groups: black and white exteriors of these locations (sorted into eight types, such as warehouses, shops and supermarkets) unfold using gatefolds to present color photographs of the Muslims typically praying within half of them.

Degiorgis runs the publishing house Rorhof with his brother Michele. He was guest curator of Museion in Bolzano, Italy for 2017.

== Publications ==
- Oasis Hotel. Bolzano, Italy: self-published / Rorhof, 2014. ISBN 9788890981715.
- Hidden Islam. Bolzano, Italy: self-published / Rorhof, 2014. With an introduction by Martin Parr. ISBN 978-88-909817-0-8. Total of 5000 copies of all editions.
  - Bolzano, Italy: self-published / Rorhof, 2014.
  - Bolzano, Italy: self-published / Rorhof, 2015.
- Hidden Islam – 479 comments. Bolzano, Italy: self-published / Rorhof, 2014. ISBN 9788890981739. Edition of 300 copies.
- Peak. Bolzano, Italy: self-published / Rorhof, 2017. ISBN 978-88-909817-6-0.
- Blue As Gold. Bolzano, Italy: self-published / Rorhof, 2017. ISBN 978-88-94881-09-7. Edition of 350 copies.
- Heimatkunde. Bolzano, Italy: self-published / Rorhof, 2017. ISBN 9788894881004. Edition of 750 copies.
- Prison Photography. Bolzano, Italy: self-published / Rorhof, 2017. ISBN 978-88-94881-01-1. Edition of 400 copies.
- Prison Museum. Bolzano, Italy: self-published / Rorhof, 2021. ISBN 978-88-909817-0-8. With essays by Letizia Ragaglia and Anna Rita Nuzzaci. Edition of 1000 copies.

== Awards ==
- 2014: Winner, First PhotoBook award, Paris Photo–Aperture Foundation PhotoBook Awards for Hidden Islam
- 2014: 1 of 5 gold winners, Deutscher Fotobuchpreis 2015, for Hidden Islam
- 2014: Author Book Award, Rencontres d'Arles, Arles, France for Hidden Islam

== Exhibitions ==
- Hämatli & Patriæ, Museion, Bolzano, Italy, 2017
