= Sasha Phyars-Burgess =

American photographer (born 1988)

- Born: 1988 (age 37–38); Brooklyn, New York, U.S.
- Education: Bard College (BA); Cornell University (MFA)
- Awards: Guggenheim Fellowship (2023)

Sasha Phyars-Burgess (born 1988) is an American photographer. Her work explores her Trinidadian-American heritage, particularly in her 2021 book Untitled, and she is a 2023 Guggenheim Fellow.

== Biography ==
Sasha Phyars-Burgess was born in 1988 in Brooklyn, and raised in Bethlehem, Pennsylvania. Her parents are Trinidadian-American.

Phyars-Burgess attended Bard College, where she got a BA in Photography in 2010. She then won several awards, such as the Tierney Fellowship and the Garrison Art Center's 2011 Best in Show Award. She briefly lived in Berlin to exhibit work for the CK Gallery, as well as in Trinidad and Tobago to document the Trinidad and Tobago Carnival. In 2016, she held an exhibition at Enfoco in New York City; titled THERE (Yankee), it explored her Trinidadian-American heritage as a theme. She obtained her MFA at Cornell University in 2018.

In February 2021, the Capricious Foundation published Phyars-Burgess' first monograph, Untitled, where her Trinidadian-American heritage is explored as a theme. Hannah Abel-Hirsch said that her book "depict[s] everyday moments observed by Phyars-Burgess’ meditative lens [and] contribute to a photographic archive of Black life created by Black image-makers, depicting the fullness of their existence despite the continual threats against it; threats and violence which otherwise dominate contemporary representations of Black life." Untitled won the 2021 Paris Photo–Aperture Foundation PhotoBook Award for First PhotoBook. In 2023, she was awarded a Guggenheim Fellowship in Photography. She has also served as artist-in-residence for the Maryland Institute College of Art's Photography + Media & Society MFA program.

Phyars-Burgess' series of photographs on "the global impact of sugar cane plantations on the people and land of the Black diaspora" were featured in the 2024 Lincoln University exhibition Ratoon. In 2025, she held Everything Nice, an exhibition of photographs that "explore histories of slavery, sugarcane cultivation and survival across the African diaspora", at Syracuse University's Light Work gallery. Phyars-Burgess announced that her Everything Nice project would later involve Trinidad and Tobago, Brazil, and several African countries. Earlier that year, she was part of Bryan Schutmaat and Pablo Cabado's 2025 joint exhibition United Worlds.

Living in Chicago in 2021, she had moved to Bethlehem in 2024. She is also a close friend and collaborator with Carolyn Lazard, a classmate from Bard.
