= Curran Hatleberg =

American photographer (born 1982)

- Born: Curran Hatleberg; 1982 (age 43–44); Washington D.C.
- Education: Yale University, MFA Photography
- Known for: Photography
- Awards: 2015 Magnum Emergency Fund Grant, 2014 Aaron Siskind Foundation Individual Photographer's Fellowship Grant, 2010 Richard Benson Prize for Excellence in Photography
- Website: curranhatleberg.com

Curran Hatleberg is an American photographer. He attended Yale University and graduated in 2010 with an MFA. Influenced by the American tradition of road photography, Hatleberg's process entails driving throughout the United States and interacting with various strangers in different locales. His work was included in the Whitney Biennial 2019.

== Work ==
While speaking about his practice Hatleberg explained,

I feel a specific devotion to the unknown. It's a kind of worship. When I stumble into the right person and place and feeling, I want to go all the way in and let it wash over me. In those rare moments, the world is so overwhelmingly generous; everything feels imbued with reverence and wonder.

Driving is an integral element to how Hatleberg creates his work and he frequently discusses this when asked about his photographic practice,

When I was a child, the only way my parents could get me to fall asleep was to put me in the car and drive around the block. Maybe it was the sound of tires on cement, or the rush of the wind pouring in that sedated me. Perhaps this is an origin story, why my work is still so much about driving.

In a published conversation with fellow photographer Matthew Genitempo, Hatleberg noted that

Chance and accident are the foundation of my entire practice. I start out with a vague notion, aiming towards a region I'm interested in, then wait until something feels right. It's purely visceral. I like driving long distances, looking around, making it up as I go. It's a loose approach that favors intuitive thinking over analytical design. Then, when I finally find a place, there's no mistaking it; there's an undeniable atmospheric weight. I can feel it come over me. A place that's a sure thing will almost feel like a stage.

According to Hatleberg, his photographs are intended to function as "a fiction that is more real than reality." Hatleberg's roadtrips are lengthy and his editing process doesn't occur until later on - "I don't look over anything until I've shot hundreds of rolls."

During an interview with the Birmingham Museum of Art Hatleberg articulated that he identifies most with "an American tradition of photography—from Walker Evans to William Eggleston. They are my heroes, but it's undoubtedly a different time. I think it's essential to take from tradition without being bound to it—to author one's own time." In 2015, Jordan Teicher wrote in Photograph,"Hatleberg's photos succeed as social documentary, but to see them only that way ignores their freewheeling poetry, and their lack of any sort of useable, concrete information." Hatleberg has also discussed fiction writing as an influence on his work, "After reading, everyone you pass on the street becomes fascinating or mysterious; the scenery shifts and everything seems infused with potent meaning."

In 2015, TBW Books published Hatleberg's first monograph, Lost Coast. Throughout the series,

Hatleberg presents an episodic narrative about Eureka, California. Intimate portraits of town and people function like a collection of short stories, building to an understanding of place. The pictures live between extremes, between the grand and the granular, between the breathtaking natural landscape and the grim realities of industrial decline.

Hatleberg spoke of the project and explained that

when making Lost Coast, I attempted to make pictures that communicated more what my own personal experience of that place felt like, not what the place is really like. For me, the work is more like a dream I had about a real place than a depiction of reality. There's this incredible hubris in to trying to portray a place or a person. How can a photographer ever possibly represent a unique region, lifestyle, or person within a few pictures?

In 2022, TBW Books published Hatleberg's second monograph, River's Dream. The work was shot between 2010 and 2020 in the American South. With 65 pictures, "Hatleberg centers his narrative on the dog days of summer. Sweltering heat, dripping humidity, lush vegetation, and screaming insects". The book includes essays by Natasha Trethewey and Joy Williams.

== Teaching appointments ==
Hatleberg has taught photography at Yale University, Cooper Union, and the International Center of Photography.

== Exhibitions ==
- The Heart is a Lonely Hunter, June 2015 – August 2015, Fraenkel Gallery. San Francisco, CA
- Curran Hatleberg, May – June 2016. Higher Pictures, New York, NY
- The Half-Life of Love, May 2017 – March 2018, MASS MoCA, North Adams, MA

=== Whitney Biennial 2019 ===
Hatleberg's work was featured in the 2019 Whitney Biennial. The curatorial statement by Rujeko Hockley and Jane Panetta details, "Much of the art that we selected for the 2019 Biennial was steeped in socio-political concerns - an engagement important to us as curators - while at the same time remaining open ended and hopeful." PBS Newshour reported "In a deeply divided America, the artists chosen by curators Panetta and Hockley exhibit a quieter tone than in the past. "

== Publications ==
- Lost Coast (TBW, 2015)
- Somewhere Someone. Hassla, 2017. With Cynthia Daignault. ISBN 978-1-940881-21-8. Edition of 500 copies.
- Double Rainbow. Self-published, 2021. Edition of 200 copies.
- River's Dream (TBW, 2022)

== Awards ==
- 2014: Aaron Siskind Foundation Individual Photographer's Fellowship Grant
- 2015: Magnum Emergency Fund
- Richard Benson Prize for Excellence in Photography
