= Dayanita Singh =

Indian photographer (born 1961)

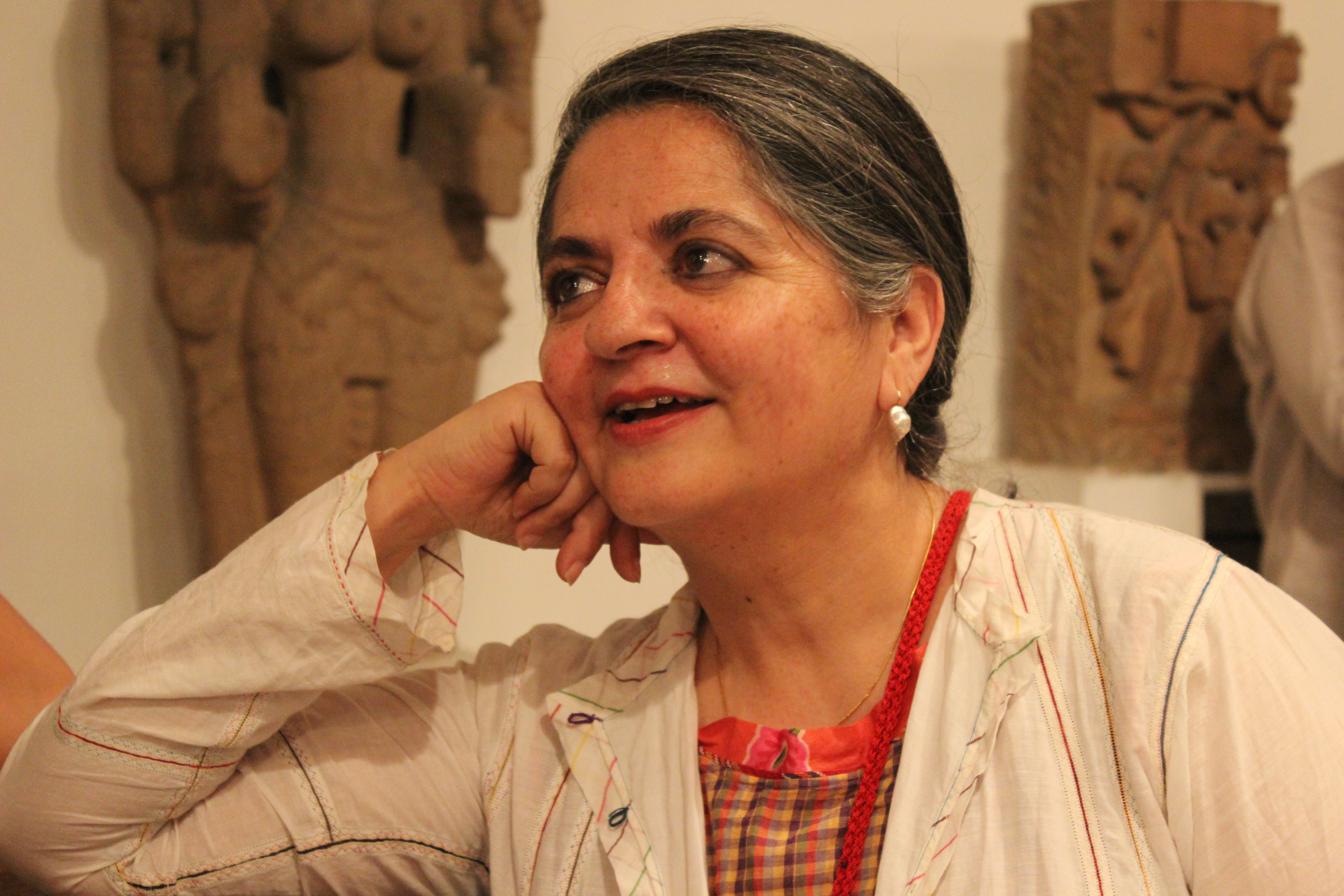
- Singh at National Museum, New Delhi, 2014
- Born: 18 March 1961 (age 65); New Delhi, India
- Education: National Institute of Design
- Known for: Artist; photographer
- Notable work: Museum Bhavan (2013); Myself Mona Ahmed (2001)
- Style: Documentary, Portrait
- Awards: Ordre des Arts et des Lettres (2014); Prince Claus Award (2008); Hasselblad Award (2022)
- Website: dayanitasingh.net

Dayanita Singh (born 18 March 1961) is an Indian photographer whose primary format is the book. She has published fourteen books.

Singh's art reflects and expands on the ways in which people relate to photographic images. Her later works, drawn from her extensive photographic oeuvre, are a series of mobile museums allowing her images to be endlessly edited, sequenced, archived and displayed. Stemming from her interest in the archive, the "Museums" as she calls them, present her photographs as interconnected bodies of work that are full of both poetic and narrative possibilities.

Publishing is also a significant part of Singh's practice. She has created multiple "book-objects" – works that are concurrently books, art objects, exhibitions, and catalogues – often with the publisher Steidl. Museum Bhavan has been shown at the Hayward Gallery, London (2013), the Museum für Moderne Kunst, Frankfurt (2014), the Art Institute of Chicago, Chicago (2014) and the Kiran Nadar Museum of Art, New Delhi (2016).

== Early life and background ==
Singh was born in New Delhi on 18 March 1961. She was the oldest of four sisters.

Singh studied Visual Communication at the National Institute of Design in Ahmedabad and later Documentary Photography at the International Center of Photography in New York City. She started her career in photojournalism and retired in the late 1990s.

== Career ==
Singh's first foray into photography and bookmaking came through a chance encounter with tabla player Zakir Hussain, when he invited her to photograph him in rehearsal after she was shoved by an aggressive official while attempting to shoot him in concert. For the six winters following, Singh documented several Hussain tours and, in 1986, finally published the images in her first book, Zakir Hussain. Referring to him as her first "true guru", Singh believes that Hussain taught her the most important of all skills: focus.

"Read, read, read. Forget studying photography – just go and study literature. Then you will bring something to the photography."

— Dayanita Singh, The Guardian, 2014

Singh's second book, Myself Mona Ahmed was published in 2001, after more than a decade spent on assignment as a photojournalist. A mix of photobook, biography, autobiography and fiction, this 'visual novel' emerged as a result of her refusal to be the subject of what could have been a routine but problematic photojournalistic project as well as her discomfort with the West's tendency to view India through simplistic, exotic lenses.

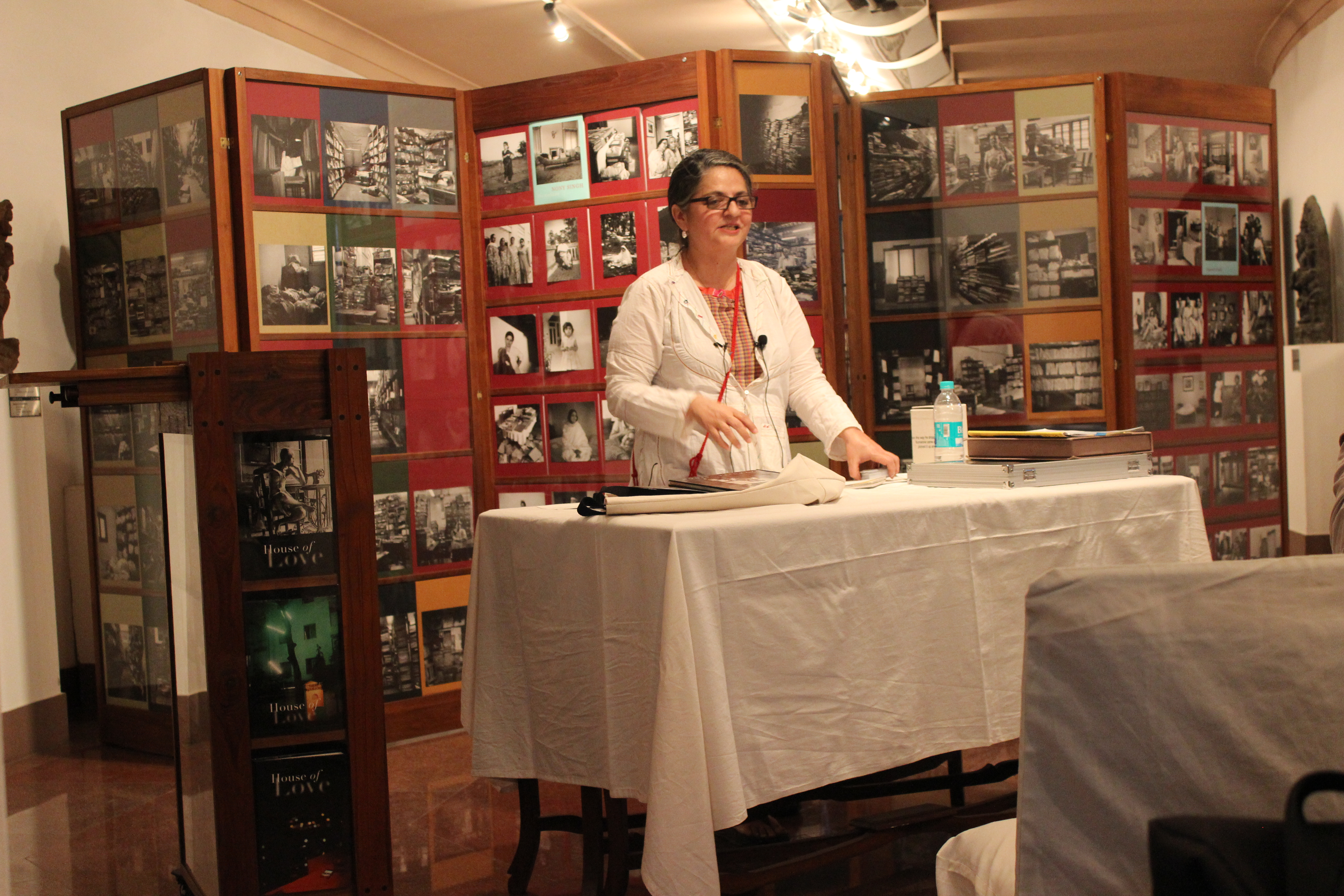
Dayanita Singh in the National Museum, New Delhi, 2014.

In the years following, publishing has been a significant part of Singh's career. She has created multiple "book-objects" – works that are concurrently books, art objects, exhibitions, and catalogues—often in collaboration with the publisher Gerhard Steidl in Göttingen, Germany. These include Privacy, Chairs, the direction-changing Go Away Closer, the seven-volume Sent a Letter, Blue Book, Dream Villa, Fileroom and Museum of Chance. Sent a Letter was included in the 2011 Phaidon Press book Defining Contemporary Art: 25 years in 200 Pivotal Artworks. Steidl said in a 2013 interview on Deutsche Welle television, "She is the genius of book making". Dream Villa was produced during her Robert Gardner Fellowship in Photography given annually by the Peabody Museum of Archaeology and Ethnology at Harvard University; Singh was its second recipient in 2008.

The "book-object" medium has allowed Singh to explore her interest in the poetic and narrative possibility of sequence and re-sequence, allowing her to create photographic patterns while simultaneously disrupting them. Her books rarely include text; instead she lets the photographs speak for themselves. These ideas are furthered through her experimentation with alternate ways of producing and viewing photographs to explore how people relate to photographic images.

Singh has created and displayed a series of mobile museums, giving her the space to constantly sequence, edit, and archive her images. These mobile museums stemmed in large part from Singh's interest in archives and the archival process. Her mobile museums are displayed in large wooden architectural structures that can be rearranged and opened or closed in various ways. Each holds 70 to 140 photographs that Singh rearranges for each show so that only a portion of the photos or parts of each images are visible at any given time, capitalizing on the interconnected and fluid capacity of her work while allowing ample opportunity for evolving narratives and interpretations.

Museum Bhavan has been shown at the Hayward Gallery, London (2013), the Museum für Moderne Kunst, Frankfurt (2014), the Art Institute of Chicago, Chicago (2014) and the Kiran Nadar Museum of Art, New Delhi (2016).

Singh's works have also been presented at the German pavilion in the Venice Biennale. In 2009, the Fundación MAPFRE in Madrid organised a retrospective of her work, which subsequently travelled to Amsterdam, Bogota and Umea. Her pictures of "File Rooms" were first presented in the exhibition, Illuminazione, at the 2011 Venice Biennale.

In 2014, at the National Museum, New Delhi, Singh built the Book Museum using her publications File Room and Privacy as well as her mother's book, Nony Singh: The Archivist. And she also displayed a part of Kitchen Museum which are accordion-fold books with silver gelatin prints in 8 teak vitrines that she makes as letters to fellow travellers or conservationists since 2000. Seven of these were published by Steidl as "Sent a Letter".

Singh also presented the Museum of Chance as a book-object for the first time in India in November 2014 at a show in the Goethe-Institut in Mumbai and in January 2015 at a show in the Goethe-Institut / Max Mueller Bhavan in New Delhi. The book-object is a work that is a book, an art object, an exhibition and a catalogue, all at once. In order to move away from showing editioned prints framed on the wall, Singh made the book itself the art object: a work to be valued, looked at and read as such, rather than being regarded as a gathering of photographic reproductions.

In 2018, Singh released Museum Bhavan as a book. It is an "exhibition" in the form of a book, with "galleries" held in a small box containing nine thin accordion books that expand to a 7.5-foot-long gallery of black and white photos drawn from Singh's archive. In 2017 Museum Bhavan won PhotoBook of the Year in the Paris Photo–Aperture Foundation PhotoBook Awards and in 2018 was awarded the Infinity Award of the International Center of Photography.

Dayanita Singh served as a Jury Member for the Serendipity Arles Grant 2020.

== Publications ==
=== Book objects ===
- Box 507, Spontaneous, New Delhi.
- Box of Shedding, Spontaneous, New Delhi.
- BV Box, Spontaneous, New Delhi.
- Pothi Box, Spontaneous, New Delhi.
- Kochi Box, Spontaneous, New Delhi.
- Museum of Chance Book Object.
- File Room Book Object

=== Books by Singh ===
- Zakir Hussain, Himalaya, 1986.
- Myself Mona Ahmed, Scalo, 2001. ISBN 978-3-908247-46-3
- Privacy, Steidl, 2004. ISBN 978-3-88243-962-5
- Chairs, Isabella Stewart Gardner Museum and Steidl, 2005.
- Go Away Closer, Steidl, 2006. ISBN 978-3-86521-386-0
- Sent a Letter, Steidl, 2008. ISBN 978-3-86521-454-6
- Blue Book, Steidl, 2009. ISBN 978-3-86521-839-1
- Dream Villa, Steidl, 2010. ISBN 978-3-86521-985-5
- House of Love, Radius & Peabody Museum 2011. ISBN 978-1-934435-27-4
- File Room, Steidl, 2013. ISBN 978-3-86930-542-4
- Museum of Chance, Steidl, 2015. ISBN 978-3-86930-693-3
- Museum Bhavan, Steidl, 2017. ISBN 978-3-95829-161-4
- Zakir Hussain Maquette, Steidl, 2019. ISBN 978-3-95829-623-7
- Sea of Files, Steidl and the Hassleblad Foundation, 2022. ISBN 9783969991541

== Exhibitions ==
=== Solo exhibitions ===
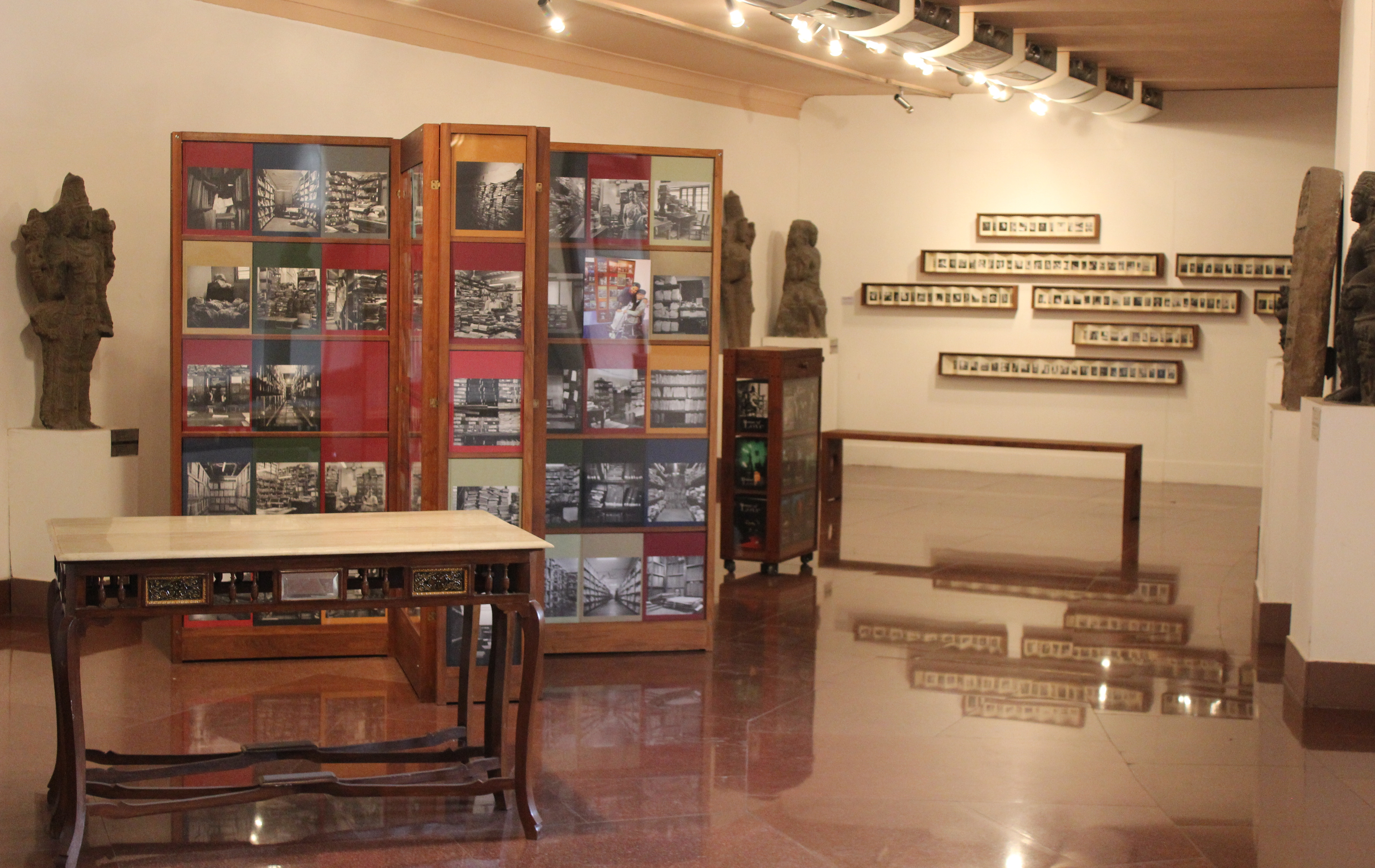
Book Museum in the National Museum, New Delhi

- 2000 I am as I am, Ikon Gallery, Birmingham
- 2003 Dayanita Singh: Image/Text (Photographs 1989–2002), Department of Art and Aesthetics. Jawaharlal Nehru University, New Delhi
- 2003 Myself Mona Ahmed, Museum of Asian Art, Berlin
- 2003 Dayanita Singh: Privacy, Nationalgalerie im Hamburger Bahnhof, Berlin
- 2004 Privacy, Rencontres-Arles, Arles
- 2005 Chairs, Isabella Stewart Gardner museum, Boston
- 2007 Go Away Closer, Kriti gallery, Varanasi
- 2008 Sent a Letter, National Gallery of Modern Art, Mumbai
- 2008 Les Rencontres d'Arles festival, France
- 2010 Dayanita Singh (Photographs 1989 – 2010), Huis Marseille, Amsterdam, Netherlands
- 2010 Dayanita Singh, Mapfre Foundation, Madrid
- 2011 Dayanita Singh, Museum of Art, Bogota
- 2011 House of Love, Peabody Museum, Harvard University, Cambridge
- 2012 Monuments of Knowledge, Photographs by Dayanita Singh, King's College London
- 2012 Dayanita Singh / The Adventures of a Photographer, Bildmuseet, Umea University, Sweden
- 2013 Go Away Closer, Hayward Gallery, London
- 2014 Building the Book Museum: photography, language, form National Museum, New Delhi
- 2014 Go Away Closer, MMK Museum für Moderne Kunst Frankfurt am Main, Frankfurt
- 2014 Dayanita Singh, Art Institute, Chicago
- 2014 Museum of Chance: A Book Story, Goethe-Institut, Mumbai
- 2015 Dayanita Singh: Book works, Goethe-Institut / Max Mueller Bhavan, New Delhi
- 2015–2016 Conversation Chambers Museum Bhavan, Kiran Nadar Museum of Art, New Delhi
- 2016 Museum of Chance Book Object, Hawa Mahal, Jaipur
- 2016 Museum of Chance Book Object, Dhaka Art Summit, Bangladesh
- 2017 Dayanita Singh: Museum Bhavan, Tokyo Photographic Art Museum, Tokyo
- 2022 Dayanita Singh: Dancing with my Camera, Gropius Bau, Berlin and Villa Stuck, Munich
- 2022 Dayanita Singh: Sea of Files, the Hasselblad Foundation, Gothenburg
- 2023 Dayanita Singh: Dancing with my Camera, Mudam, Luxembourg-Kirchberg
- 2024 Dayanita Singh: Golden Square, Frith Street Gallery, London
- 2024–2025 Dayanita Singh: Photo Lies, Jehangir Nicholson Art Foundation, Mumbai
- 2026 Archivio, State Archives of Venice

=== Group exhibitions ===
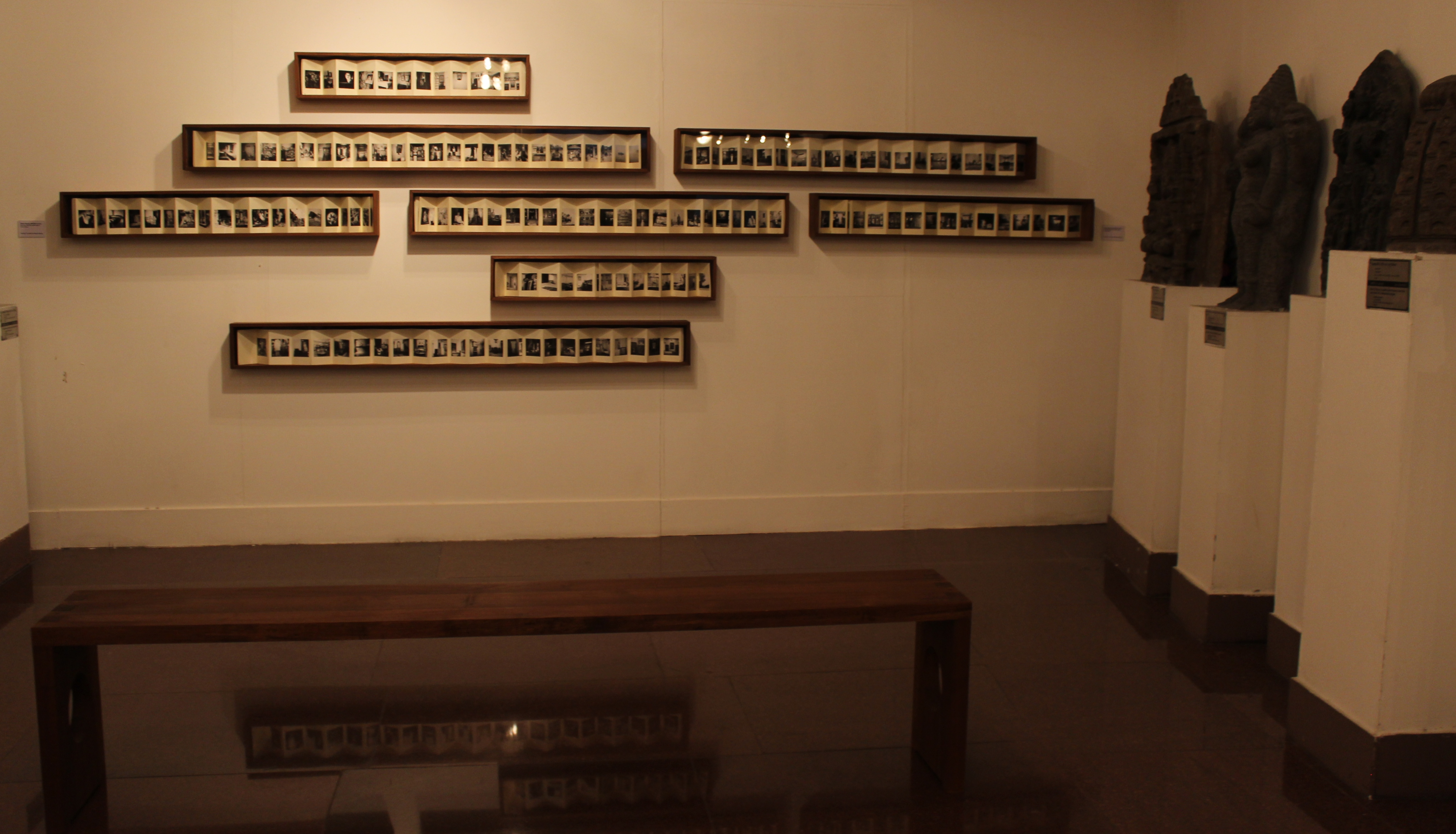
Kitchen Museum in the National Museum, New Delhi

- 1995 So many worlds—Photographs from DU Magazine, Holderbank, Aargau, Switzerland
- 2000 Century City, Tate Modern, London
- 2002 Photo Sphere, Nature Morte, New Delhi
- 2005 Edge of Desire, Asia Society, New York
- 2005 Presence, Sepia International, New York
- 2006 Cities in Transition, NYC, Boston Hartford
- 2013 Biennale di Venezia, German Pavilion
- 2016 Biennale of Sydney, Museum of Contemporary Art, Sydney, Australia
- 2016 Dhaka Art Summit, Bangladesh
- 2017 Tate Modern, London.
- 2018 Fearless: Contemporary South Asian Art, Art Gallery New South Wales, Sydney
- 2018 57th Carnegie International, Carnegie Museum of Art, Pittsburgh
- 2019 Surrounds: 11 Installations, The Museum of Modern Art, New York
- 2020 Off the Wall, San Francisco Museum of Modern Art, San Francisco
- 2023 Mirror/Maze: echoes of song, space and spectre, Kiran Nadar Museum of Art, New Delhi

== Honors and awards ==
- 2008 Robert Gardner Fellowship, Harvard University
- 2008 Prince Claus Award, Government of The Netherlands
- 2014 Chevalier dans l'Ordre des Arts et des Lettres
- 2017 Paris Photo-Aperture Foundation PhotoBook Awards, PhotoBook of the Year: Museum Bhavan
- 2018 International Center of Photography Infinity Award, Artist's Book: Museum Bhavan
- 2022: Hasselblad Award, Hasselblad Foundation, Gothenburg, Sweden. An award of 2 million Swedish krona, or about US$206,500.

== Collections ==
Singh's work is held in the following permanent collections:

- Allen Memorial Art Museum, Oberlin, Ohio
- Art Gallery of New South Wales, Sydney
- Art Institute of Chicago, Chicago
- Asian Art Museum, San Francisco
- Centre Pompidou, Paris
- National Centre for Visual Arts, CNAP, France
- Fondazione MAST, Bologna
- Fotomuseum Winterthur, Winterthur
- Fundacion Mapfre, Madrid
- Herbert F Johnson Museum of Art, Cornell University
- Huis Marseille, Museum for Photography, Amsterdam
- Kunsthaus Zurich, Switzerland
- Louisiana Museum of Modern Art, Humlebaek
- Isabella Stewart Gardener Museum, Boston
- Ishara Art Foundation, Dubai
- Mead Art Gallery, University of Warwick
- Arthur M. Sackler Museum, Harvard University, Cambridge, Massachusetts
- Metropolitan Museum of Art, New York
- Moderna Museet, Stockholm
- Museum für Moderne Kunst, Frankfurt
- Museum of Fine Arts, Houston, Texas
- Museum of Modern Art, New York
- National Gallery of Australia, Canberra
- National Gallery of Canada, Ottawa
- National Gallery of Modern Art, New Delhi
- Nelson-Atkins Museum of Art, Kansas City, Missouri
- The New Art Gallery Walsall, Walsall
- University of Chicago Booth School of Business, Chicago
- Tokyo Photographic Art Museum
- Southampton City Art Gallery, Southampton
- Tate Modern, London
