= Paris Photo–Aperture Foundation PhotoBook Awards =

Annual photographic book award

- Awarded for: excellence in photobook publishing
- Sponsored by: Paris Photo and Aperture Foundation
- Location: Paris, New York City
- Country: France, United States
- Website: aperture.org/calls-for-entry/photobook-awards/

The Paris Photo–Aperture Foundation PhotoBook Awards is a yearly photography book award that is given jointly by Paris Photo and Aperture Foundation. It is announced at the Paris Photo fair and was established in 2012. The categories are First PhotoBook (with a $10,000 prize), Photography Catalogue of the Year, and PhotoBook of the Year.

The shortlisted books are displayed at Paris Photo and then tour to Aperture Gallery in New York and venues elsewhere. After the 2024 and 2025 awards, the shortlisted books were on view at Printed Matter, New York, and then at the Leipzig Photobook Festival. In 2026, the shortlisted books will be on view in Dublin at PhotoIreland in December 2026, and later at other venues.

== PhotoBook of the Year winners ==
- 2012: City Diary (Volumes 1–3) by Anders Petersen (Steidl, 2012).
- 2013: A01 [COD.19.1.1.43] — A27 [S | COD.23] by Rosângela Rennó (RR Edições, 2013). Special jury recognition was awarded to War/Photography: Images of Armed Conflict and Its Aftermath, edited by Anne Wilkes Tucker and Will Michels with Natalie Zelt (Museum of Fine Arts, Houston/Yale University Press, 2012).
- 2014: Imaginary Club by Oliver Sieber (Editions GwinZegal/BöhmKobayashi, 2013). Special mention was awarded to Photographs for Documents by Vytautas V. Stanionis (Kaunas Photography Gallery, 2013).
- 2015: Illustrated People by Thomas Mailaender (Archive of Modern Conflict/RVB Books, 2015). Special Jurors’ Mention was awarded to Deadline by Will Steacy (b.frank books, 2015).
- 2016: ZZYZX by Gregory Halpern (Mack, 2016). Special Jurors’ Mention was awarded to Taking Stock of Power: An Other View of the Berlin Wall by Annett Gröschner and Arwed Messmer (Hatje Cantz, 2016).
- 2017: Museum Bhavan by Dayanita Singh (Steidl, 2017). Special Jurors’ Mention was awarded to La Grieta (The Crack) by Carlos Spottorno and Guillermo Abril (Astiberri Ediciones, 2016).
- 2018: On Abortion by Laia Abril (Dewi Lewis Publishing, 2017).
- 2019: The Coast by Sohrab Hura (UGLY DOG [self-published], 2019).
- 2020: Woman Go No’Gree by Gloria Oyarzabal (Editorial RM and Images Vevey, 2020).
- 2021: The Banda Journal by Muhammad Faldi and id:Fatris MF (Jordan, Jordan Édition, Jakarta, Indonesia).
- 2022: Périphérique by Mohamed Bourouissa (Loose Joints, Marseille, France)
- 2023: The Drawer by Vince Aletti (SPBH Editions, London)
- 2024: Disruptions by Taysir Batniji (Loose Joints Publishing, Marseille, France / London) (design by Loose Joints Studio)
- 2025: The Classroom by Hicham Benohoud (Loose Joints Publishing, Marseille, France / London) (design by Loose Joints Studio)
- 2026: Passports, 2012–2025 by Keisha Scarville (MACK, London) (design by Keisha Scarville and Morgan Crowcroft-Brown)

== First PhotoBook winners ==
- 2012: Concresco by David Galjaard (Self-published, 2012).
- 2013: KARMA by Óscar Monzón (RVB/Dalpine, 2013).
- 2014: Hidden Islam by Nicolò Degiorgis (Rorhof, 2014).
- 2015: You Haven't Seen Their Faces by Daniel Mayrit (Riot, 2015).
- 2016: Libyan Sugar by Michael Christopher Brown (Twin Palms, 2016).
- 2017: Monsanto: A Photographic Investigation by Mathieu Asselin (Kettler, 2017).
- 2018: One Wall a Web by Stanley Wolukau-Wanambwa (Roma, 2018). Special Jurors' Mention was awarded to Experimental Relationship Vol. 1 by Pixy Liao (Jiazazhi, 2018).
- 2019: The Eighth Day by Gao Shan (Imageless, 2019).
  - Special Jurors' Mention was awarded to This World and Others Like It (Fw and Yoffy, 2019).
- 2020: Living Trust by Buck Ellison (Loose Joints, 2020).
- 2021: Untitled by Sasha Phyars-Burgess (Capricious, New York).
- 2022: Hafiz: Guardians of the Qur'an by Sabiha Çimen (Red Hook, 2021)
- 2023: Tender by Carla Williams (TBW Books, Oakland, California)
- 2024: Born from the Same Root by Tsai Ting Bang (Self-published, Taipei) (design by Tsai Ting Bang and Shū Hé Zhì)
- 2025: A Study on Waitressing by Eleonora Agostini (Witty Books, Turin, Italy) (design by Massimiliano Pace)
- 2026: Notation(s) by Moeko Ishiguro (Self-published, Tokyo) (design by Moeko Ishiguro)

== Photography Catalogue of the Year winners ==
- 2014: Christopher Williams: The Production Line of Happiness and Christopher Williams: Printed in Germany by Christopher Williams (Art Institute of Chicago, 2014) and (Walther König, 2014).
- 2015: Diane Dufour and Xavier Barral for Images of Conviction: The Construction of Visual Evidence (Xavier Barral and Le Bal, 2015).
- 2016: Wojciech Zamecznik: Photo-graphics by Karolina Puchała-Rojek and Karolina Ziębińska-Lewandowska (Fundacja Archeologia Fotografii, 2015).
- 2017: New Realities: Photography in the 19th Century by Mattie Boom and Hans Rooseboom (Rijksmuseum and nai010, 2017).
- 2018: The Land in Between by Ursula Schulz-Dornburg (Mack, 2018).
- 2019: Enghelab Street, A Revolution through Books: Iran 1979–1983 by Hannah Darabi (Spector Books and Le Bal, 2019).
- 2020: Imagining Everyday Life: Engagements with Vernacular Photography by Tina M. Campt, Marianne Hirsch, Gil Hochberg, and Brian Wallis, eds. (Walther Collection and Steidl, 2020).
- 2021: What They Saw: Historical Photobooks by Women, 1843–1999 by Russet Lederman and Olga Yatskevich, eds. (10×10 Photobooks, New York).
- 2022: Devour the Land: War and American Landscape Photography since 1970 by Makeda Best (Yale University Press)
- 2023: The Public Life of Women: A Feminist Memory Project by Diwas Raja Kc and NayanTara Gurung Kakshapati (Nepal Picture Library / photo.circle, Kathmandu, Nepal)
- 2024: Shining Lights: Black Women Photographers in 1980s–90s Britain, Joy Gregory, editor, and Taous Dahmani, associate editor (Autograph and MACK, London) (design by Morgan Crowcroft-Brown)
- 2025: Generalized Visual Resistance: Photobooks and Liberation Movements, Edited by Catarina Boieiro and Raquel Schefer (ATLAS, Lisbon) (design by Teo Furtado and Ana Schefer)
- 2026: L Is for Look: Children’s Photobooks, Edited by Anne Lacoste and Rose Durr (Spector Books, Leipzig) (design by Ina Kwon and Helmut Völter)
