= Sabiha Çimen =

Turkish photographer

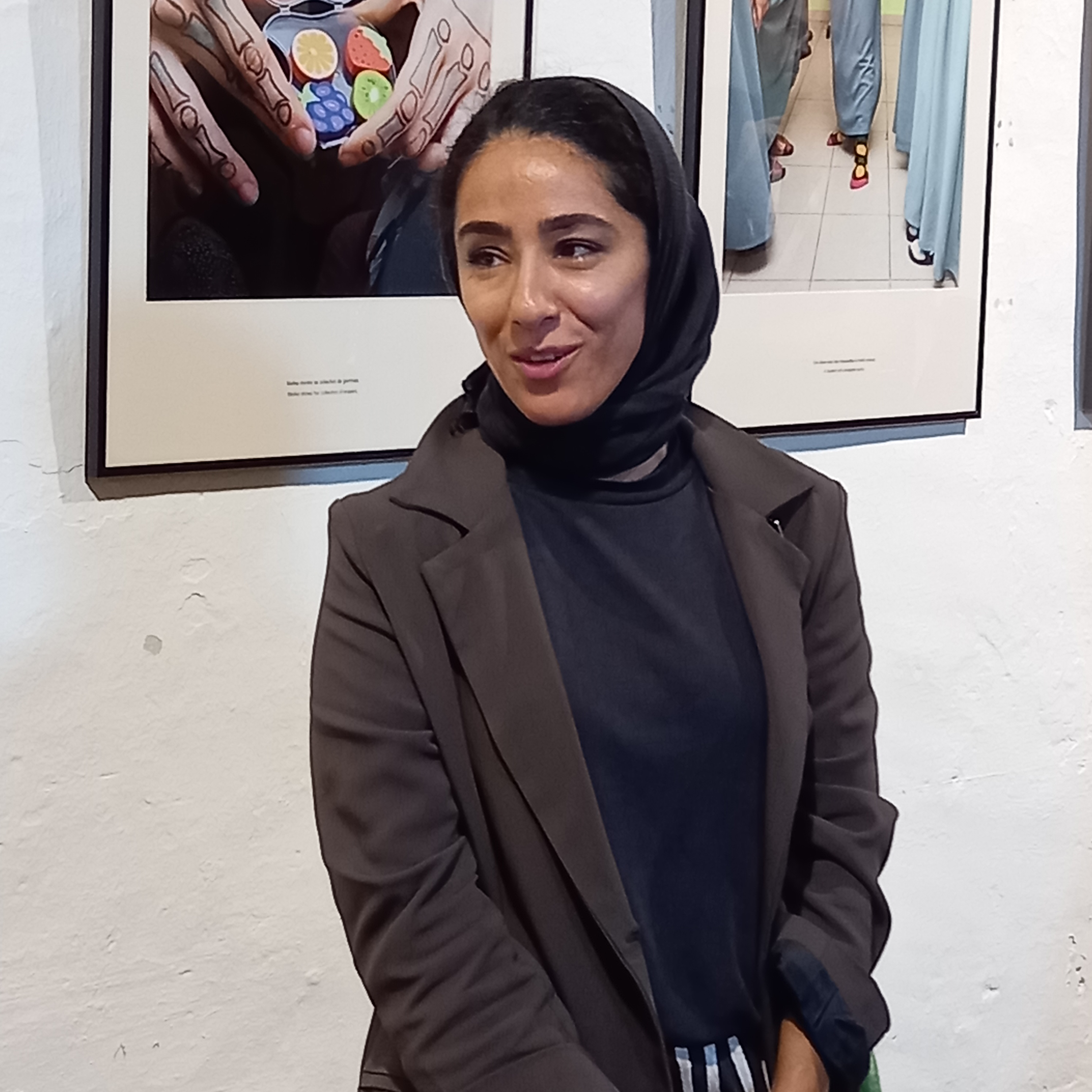
Sabiha Çimen

Sabiha Çimen (born 1986) is a Turkish photographer. Her series Hafiz, about girls at Quran schools in Turkey, was shown in a solo exhibition at Kunsthal, Rotterdam. For Hafiz, Çimen received a W. Eugene Smith Memorial Fund Grant, 2nd Prize in the Long-Term Projects category of the World Press Photo award, and the First Photobook Award at the Paris Photo–Aperture Foundation PhotoBook Awards.

== Early life and education ==
Çimen was born in Istanbul to an ethnically Kurdish Persian family. She graduated from Istanbul Bilgi University with an undergraduate degree in international trade and finance, and a master's degree in cultural studies. Her master's thesis on subaltern studies, which includes her photo story "Turkey as a Simulated Country", was published in 2019. She is a self-taught photographer.

== Life and work ==
Çimen's book Hafiz: Guardians of the Qur'an (2021) shows the daily lives of students at girls-only Hafiz schools throughout Turkey. "Hafiz" means "guardian" and refers to people who memorize the Quran. Çimen spent 3 years herself studying in such a school, where she returned to in 2017 to begin making this autobiographical work. She went on to photograph Quran schools elsewhere until 2021.

Çimen became a Magnum Photos Nominee member in 2020.

== Personal life ==
Çimen has a twin sister.

== Publications ==
- Turkey as a Simulated Country. Cambridge Scholars, 2019. ISBN 978-1-5275-1821-6.
- Hafiz: Guardians of the Qur'an. Red Hook, 2021. ISBN 978-1-7376814-0-3. Edition of 2000 copies.

== Exhibitions ==
=== Solo exhibitions ===
- Hafiz, Visa pour l'Image, Perpignan, France, 2022
- Sabiha Çimen: Hafiz, Kunsthal, Rotterdam, Netherlands, January–May 2023

=== Group exhibitions ===
- Close Enough: New Perspectives from 12 Women Photographers of Magnum, International Center of Photography, New York, September 2022 – January 2023, included Çimen's Hafiz

== Awards ==
- 2018: 3rd Prize, PHmuseum Women Photographer Grant
- 2020: W. Eugene Smith Memorial Fund Grant Recipient. One of five co-winners.
- 2020: 2nd Prize, Long-Term Projects category, World Press Photo for Hafız
- 2020: Canon Female Photojournalist Grant, for Hafiz. An €8,000 award.
- 2022: Winner, First Photobook Award, Paris Photo–Aperture Foundation PhotoBook Awards for Hafiz
