= Ursula Schulz-Dornburg =

German photographer and artist

- Born: 1938 (age 87–88); Berlin, Germany
- Occupation: Photographer
- Known for: Conceptual photography

Ursula Schulz-Dornburg (born 1938) is a German conceptual photographer and artist who lives and works in Düsseldorf, Germany. Her photographs follow a minimalist aesthetic and incorporate documentary and conceptual approaches. She is best known for her serial photographs of historical architecture in Europe, the Caucasus, and the Middle East.

== Early life and education ==
Schulz-Dornburg was born in Berlin in 1938. In 1958, she moved to Munich where she studied ethnology at the Ludwig-Maximilians-Universität München. In 1959, she switched to studying photojournalism at the Institute for Photojournalism in Munich where she remained a student until its closure in 1960 due to the death of its founder Hans Schreiner.

== Work ==
Schulz-Dornburg began photographing as a teenager when she experimented with her uncle's large-format glass-plate camera. In 1967, she lived in New York City where she became acquainted with land art and conceptual art, and she continued following these art movements upon her return to Germany. The early encounter with artists such as Robert Frank, Ed Ruscha, Robert Smithson, Michael Heizer, Richard Long, and Walter De Maria had a lasting effect on Schulz-Dornburg's conceptual approach to photography throughout her career.

After returning to Germany, Schulz-Dornburg engaged in social work primarily with drug addicts, using photography as a therapeutic device. In 1969, she photographed adventure playgrounds in Amsterdam leading to her first photo series published in Abenteuerspielplätze: ein Plädoyer für wilde Spiele. This publication marked the first of many book projects centered around Schulz-Dornburg's photography.

Schulz-Dornburg's early photographic work originated from various international journeys often to regions not easily accessible to foreign travelers, which established a pattern for her future work. Her second book project documenting the curtains at the Piazza San Marco in Venice, realized in collaboration with the architect Katharina Sattler, reveals the influence of Ed Ruscha's seminal photobook Every Building on Sunset Strip. Other series from Schulz-Dornburg's 1970s oeuvre were shot in Burma, England, China, and Turkey. Schulz-Dornburg's 1980 travels through Iraq, which resulted, among others, in a photo series on the Marsh Arabs, marked an important point in Schulz-Dornburg's career. Her photographs document the environment of the Mesopotamian Marshes and the culture of their inhabitants shortly before the draining of the marshes ordered by Saddam Hussein and the ensuing destruction of this ecosystem and cultural landscape. This interest in environmental issues continued on in other series such as Ewiger Weizen, which documents the biodiversity of wheat species and its decline in the wake of industrial monoculture farming through serial photographs of over one hundred unique wheat ears and seeds. Marking her longest project, which began in 1985 and ended in 1994 with the permission to photograph the Vavilov Institute in St. Petersburg, Ewiger Weizen formed part of the exhibition "Zur Nachahmung empfohlen!: Expeditionen in Ästhetik und Nachhaltigkeit" and traveled with it around the world for over 10 years since 2010. It has gained renewed relevance on the backdrop of the Russian invasion of Ukraine.

Schulz-Dornburg first achieved international recognition with the series Sonnenstand, which documents hermitages along the Spanish section of the Camino de Santiago pilgrimage route. Dismayed by the destruction brought about by the First Gulf War, she sought to turn to a time and place of a harmonious coexistence and reciprocal inspiration of different cultures. For Schulz-Dornburg, the Mozarabic architecture of 10th- and 11th-century hermitages along the Camino encapsulated this transcultural perspective. The series' focus on the movement of light captured through the windows of the chapels' apse clearly delineated Schulz-Dornburg's conceptual style and her creation of meaning through the use of the interplay between light and darkness.

In the later years of her career, Schulz-Dornburg traveled several times to Armenia, Russia, and Syria, as well as to Georgia, Kazakhstan, and Saudi Arabia, among other locations. The journeys to Armenia resulted in multiple series, including her best-known project Transitorte, which shows Soviet-era bus stops in Armenia. Other notable series include views of the ancient city of Palmyra before its partial destruction by ISIS, of Mount Ararat captured from Armenia across the border to Turkey, of abstract monumental sculptures in Kronstadt, and of abandoned architecture of the Hejaz railway in Saudi Arabia, among others. Her last two series Opytnoe Pole and Chagan stem from a 2012 trip to the Semipalatinsk Test Site in Kazakhstan, the location of Soviet nuclear tests, where she photographed architectures specifically built to test the effects of nuclear explosions. Witnessing the extremes of the human capability for destruction led Schulz-Dornburg to abandon photographing new projects after this trip.

Although people are often absent from Schulz-Dornburg's photographs, her work interrogates human history, the human condition, and the impact of human action on the environment and cultural landscapes. Usually focused on the built environment, her series capture spaces that symbolize transition, are engulfed in transformation, or stand as remnants of a transformed past. With her photographs she aims to capture shifts in political power, reflecting on borders and boundaries as they emerge and shift, leaving behind architectural artifacts whose anachronistic nature bears witness to the past. Schulz-Dornburg relates these political and historical transformations to cosmological reflections on humans' place in the universe. Both conceptually and compositionally, for Schulz-Dornburg the horizon is the most important coordinate that anchors a shot and is itself a liminal space of transition.

Most of Schulz-Dornburg's series were shot with a Hasselblad camera, but for some series (notably Kronstadt and Memoryscapes) she used an Canon Ixus camera. Working primarily in black and white and usually printing in silver-gelatin, Schulz-Dornburg's photographs are often characterized by an "objective" deadpan style. This documentary approach results in serial typologies of her subjects, which led to her being stylistically associated with the Düsseldorf School of photography prominently represented by Bernd and Hilla Becher. Schulz-Dornburg's methodical research on each subject matter provides her photographs with intentionality, and their minimalist clarity enriches the seemingly objective stance with symbolic layers, reflecting the inherently political nature of her work. At the same time, the different iterations of a motif convey specific meanings through their seriality. The movement of light in Sonnenstand, for example, traces the movement of time and symbolizes the idea of a cosmological relationship between the stars, nature, and human life. In her series Ewiger Weizen, seriality evidences the vast genetic diversity and its looming loss in the dynamics of modern agriculture, and in her series Archivo de Indias seriality mirrors on a formal level the all-encompassing ambition of the colonial archive.

Most of Schulz-Dornburg's series were published in photo books or exhibition catalogs, many of which were designed by Schulz-Dornburg herself or with her active involvement. Schulz-Dornburg does not pursue new photography projects but continues to exhibit and publish series from her archive. In 2022, Schulz-Dornburg donated her archive to the Getty Research Institute in Los Angeles where it will be cataloged and made accessible to qualified researchers.

=== Exhibitions ===
Schulz-Dornburg had her first exhibition in 1975 at Galerie Wittrock in Düsseldorf and at Galerie Heiner Friedrich in Munich featuring her series Vorhänge am Markusplatz. She exhibited her early work in different galleries and museums across Germany and Austria before entering the international stage with her series Sonnenstand, an entire set of which was acquired by the Corcoran Gallery of Art and exhibited there as well as at the Art Institute of Chicago in 1996.

The first major retrospective of Schulz-Dornburg's oeuvre titled "Across the Territories" was held at the Institut Valencià d'Art Modern (IVAM) in 2002, which showed most of her major series created up until that point. Another important retrospective titled "The Land In-Between" was held first at the Städel Museum in Frankfurt a.M. in 2018 and subsequently adapted for Maison européenne de la photographie (MEP) in 2019/2020 under the title "Zone Grise."

Individual series from Schulz-Dornburg's oeuvre were featured in galleries and museums around the world, such as the Bibliotheca Alexandrina, the British Museum, the Centro Fotográfico Manuel Álvares Bravo in Oaxaca, Mexico, the Musée d'Art Moderne de la Ville de Paris, the Pergamonmuseum, and the Tate Modern.

Many of Schulz-Dornburg's exhibitions included works by Lawrence Weiner.

Although Schulz-Dornburg retired from actively photographing new projects, she continues to revisit her archive and to exhibit her work in different venues, including hitherto unknown series and prints. She usually assumes an active role in the design of her exhibitions, arranging her series in purposeful hangs and regularly incorporating different material objects.

== Publications ==
- Schulz-Dornburg, Ursula and Katharina Sattler. Vorhänge Am Markusplatz in Venedig: 5.-9. Mai 1973. Köln: DuMont, 1974. ISBN 978-3-7701-0833-6.
- Schulz-Dornburg, Ursula and Katharina Sattler. Palace Pier Brighton. Köln: DuMont, 1976.
- Schulz-Dornburg, Ursula and Rudolf Knubel. Ansichten von Pagan, Burma. Köln: DuMont, 1978. ISBN 978-3-7701-1074-2.
- Schulz-Dornburg, Ursula, and Rudolf Knubel. Der Tigris Des Alten Mesopotamien, Irak 1980. With a text by Carl Haenlein. Hannover: Kestner-Gesellschaft, 1981.
- Kis-Jovak, Jowa Imre, Hetty Nooy-Palm, Reimar Schefold, and Ursula Schulz-Dornburg. Banua Toraja: Changing Patterns in Architecture and Symbolism among the Sa'dan Toraja, Sulawesi, Indonesia. Amsterdam: The Royal Tropical Institute, 1988. ISBN 978-90-6832-207-1.
- Schulz-Dornburg, Ursula, and Dietmar Kamper. Sonnenstand: Acht Kalenderbauten auf dem Weg nach Santiago de Compostela. Köln: DuMont, 1993. ISBN 978-3-7701-3195-2.
- Gutschow, Niels, and Christian Graf von Hatzfeld, eds. Bagmati. Hamburg: Hamburg Environmental Institute, 1995.
- Schulz-Dornburg, Ursula, Peter Kammerer. Ewiger Weizen. Ulm: Vater und Sohn Eiselen-Stiftung, 1995. ISBN 978-3-926186-06-5.
- Schulz-Dornburg, Ursula. Sonnenstand. Medieval Hermitages along the Route to Santiago de Compostela. Berlin: Galerie Wolfgang Wittrock, Düsseldorf, 1996.
- Schulz-Dornburg, Ursula, and Matthias Bärmann. Grenzlandschaften. Düsseldorf: Wolfgang Wittrock Kunsthandel, 2000.
- Schulz-Dornburg, Ursula, and Matthias Bärmann. TransitSites. Düsseldorf, New York, Berlin: Galerie Wittrock Düsseldorf / Neuhoff Gallery New York, 2001.
- García Rosell, Juan, and J.C. Pestano. Ursula Schulz-Dornburg. A Través de Los Territorios / Across the Territories [with a foreword by Kosme de Barañano and texts by Matthias Bärmann, Kenneth White, et al.]. Valencia: IVAM, 2002. ISBN 978-84-482-3197-2.
- Schulz-Dornburg, Ursula, Hans Belting, and Tadashi Otsuru. Transit Orte. Edited by Werner Klein. Berlin: Galerie Werner Klein, 2002.
- Schulz-Dornburg, Ursula, Kristin Feireiss, and Matthias Bärmann. Architekturen des Wartens: Fotografien; Bushaltestellen in Armenien, Bahnhöfe der Hejaz-Bahn in Saudi-Arabien; Galerie Aedes West, Ausstellung vom 29.10. bis 12.12.2004. Berlin: Galerie Aedes West, 2004. ISBN 978-3-937093-37-6.
- Schulz-Dornburg, Ursula. Wüste Am 45. Längengrad. Berlin: Wolfgang Wittrock, Kunsthandel, 2006.
- Thorn-Prikker, Jan, and Ursula Schulz-Dornburg. Pagan: Zeit aus Stein; Ursula Schulz-Dornburg Fotografien; Ausstellung Oktober und November 2006 Galerie Sabine Knust München. München: Galerie Sabine Knust, 2006. ISBN 978-3-939149-05-7.
- Schulz-Dornburg, Ursula, Kristin Feireiss, and Matthias Bärmann. Architekturen des Wartens: Fotografien; Bushaltestellen in Armenien, Bahnhöfe der Hejaz-Bahn in Saudi-Arabien. Second, expanded edition. Berlin, Köln: Galerie Aedes West / Verlag der Buchhandlung Walter König, 2007.
- Schulz-Dornburg, Ursula, and Matthias Bärmann. Sonnenstand. Kalenderbauten. Berlin: Goethe-Institut Ägypten / Bibliotheca Alexandrina, 2008.
- Schulz-Dornburg, Ursula. Light of photography, silence of architecture = Luz de la fotografía, silencio de la arquitectura: [exposición, Ávila, 2008]. Edited by Kosme María de Barañano. Valladolid: Fundación Siglo para las Artes de Castilla y León, 2008. ISBN 978-84-92572-11-3.
- Schulz-Dornburg, Ursula. Ursula Schulz-Dornburg: presentzia eta ausentzia = presencia y ausencia. Edited by Kosme María de Barañano. Bilbao: Bilbao Bizkaia Kutxa Fundazioa, 2008. ISBN 978-84-8056-263-8.
- Schulz-Dornburg, Ursula. Tongkonan, Alang, and the House without Smoke. Photographs; 24.10. - 27.11.2008. Edited by Kristin Feireiss and Jürgen Commerell. Berlin: Edition Aedes, 2008. ISBN 978-3-937093-97-0.
- Bałka, Mirosław, Ursula Schulz-Dornburg, Julian Heynen. Mirosław Bałka - Ursula Schulz-Dornburg, Horizontabschreitung: dieser Katalog erscheint am Ende der Ausstellung, die im Kunstparterre München vom Januar bis Oktober 2009 stattfand. München: Kunstparterre, 2009. ISBN 978-3-9811533-3-0.
- Schulz-Dornburg, Ursula. Some works. Edited by Wolfgang Scheppe. Ostfildern: Hatje Cantz, 2014. ISBN 978-3-7757-3779-1.
- Schulz-Dornburg, Ursula, Kristin Feireiss, Hans-Jürgen Commerell, and Shoair Mavlian. Architectures of waiting, Architekturen des Wartens: photographs; bus stops in Armenia, train stations of the Hejaz Railway in Saudi Arabia; [on the occasion of the Exhibition Structure and Clarity: Charlotte Posenenske and Ursula Schulz-Dornburg at Tate Modern, 2014/2015]. 3rd ed. Köln: König, 2015. ISBN 978-3-86335-674-3.
- Schulz-Dornburg, Ursula, and Hartwig Fischer. Mountain. Berlin: Ursula Schulz-Dornburg, 2016.
- Schulz-Dornburg, Ursula, Martin Engler, Fiona Elliott, and Christiane Fischer. The Land in between: Photographs from 1980 to 2012. London: Mack, 2018. English edition: ISBN 978-1-912339-10-5. German edition; ISBN 978-1-912339-15-0.
- Bakalovic, Bruno, and Johanna Mendau, eds. No Man's Land. London: The British Museum Press, 2018.
- Schulz-Dornburg, Ursula. Yerevan 1996/1997. London: Mack, 2019. ISBN 978-1-912339-49-5.
- Schulz-Dornburg, Ursula. Zone grise: the land between. London: Mack, 2019. French language edition and addition to The Land in Between. ISBN 978-1-912339-52-5.
- Kölle, Brigitte, and Claudia Peppel, eds. Die Kunst des Wartens. Berlin: Verlag Klaus Wagenbach, 2019. ISBN 978-3-8031-3679-4.
- Schulz-Dornburg, Ursula, and Martin Zimmermann. Die Teilung Der Welt: Zeugnisse Der Kolonialgeschichte. Berlin: Verlag Klaus Wagenbach, 2020. German edition: ISBN 978-3-8031-3697-8. English edition: ISBN 978-1-913368-11-1.
- Schulz-Dornburg, Ursula, and Peter Kammerer. Von Sanaa nach Ma'rib. Edited by Kristin Feireiss and Hans-Jürgen Commerell. Berlin: Aedes, 2021. ISBN 978-3-943615-64-7.
- Schulz-Dornburg, Ursula. Bugis Houses, Celebes. London: Mack, 2021. ISBN 978-1-913620-33-2. With an essay by Sirtjo Koolhof.
- Schulz-Dornburg, Ursula. Huts, Temples, Castles: Jongensland Oost, 1969-70. London: Mack, 2022.

== Awards ==
- 2016: AIMIA AGO Photography Prize from the Art Gallery of Ontario.
- 2018: Photography Catalogue of the Year award at the Paris Photo–Aperture Foundation PhotoBook Awards, Paris for The Land In Between.
- 2024: Kunstpreis des Landes Nordrhein-Westfalen (Art Prize of the German state of North Rhine-Westphalia)
- 2025: Bernd-und-Hilla-Becher-Preis (Bernd and Hilla Becher Prize)

== Exhibitions ==
- 1975: Vorhänge am Markusplatz in Venedig with Katharina Sattler, Galerie Heiner Friedrich, Munich and Galerie Wittrock, Düsseldorf, Germany
- 1976: Palace Pier, Brighton with Katharina Sattler, Kaiser-Wilhelm-Museum, Krefeld, Germany
- 1979: Ansichten von Pagan with Franz Rudolf Knubel; German Commission for UNESCO, Bonn; Stadtmuseum Düsseldorf, Germany
- 1981: Der Tigris des alten Mesopotamien with Franz Rudolf Knubel, Kestnergesellschaft, Hannover, Germany
- 1982: Der Tigris des alten Mesopotamien with Franz Rudolf Knubel, Museum des 20. Jahrhunderts, Wien, Austria
- 1984: Der Tigris des alten Mesopotamien with Franz Rudolf Knubel, Museum Das Quadrat, Germany
- 1992: Weizen, Museum Brot und Kunst, Ulm, Germany (group exhibition; exhibited the series Ewiger Weizen)
- 1992: Sonnenstand, Galerie Wittrock, Düsseldorf, Germany
- 1996: Sonnenstand, Corcoran Gallery of Art, Washington DC
- 1997: Sonnenstand, Art Institute of Chicago
- 1999: Gen-Welten, Bundeskunsthalle, Bonn, Germany (group exhibition; exhibited the series Ewiger Weizen)
- 1999: Natural Reality, Ludwigforum, Aachen, Germany (group exhibition; exhibited the series Ewiger Weizen)
- 2001: Grenzlandschaften, Galerie Wittrock, Düsseldorf, Germany
- 2001: Vorhänge am Markusplatz in Venedig with Katharina Sattler, Galerie Elke Dröscher, Hambrug, 2001
- 2001: Transitsites, Neuhoff Gallery, New York,
- 2001: Transit Sites, Galerie Wittrock, Düsseldorf, Germany / Art | 32 | Basel, Switzerland
- 2002: Transit Orte, Galerie Werner Klein, Cologne, Germany
- 2002: Across the territories, Institut Valencià d'Art Modern (IVAM), Valencia, Spain
- 2003: Across the territories, Centro Fotográfico Álvares Bravo, Oaxaca, Mexico
- 2004: Across the territories, Galería Casa Vallarta, Guadalajara, Mexico
- 2004: Erinnerungslandschaften, Galerie Werner Klein, Cologne, Germany
- 2004: Sonnenstand, Kerkeby-Chapel, Insel Hombroich, Neuss, Germany (permanent exhibition)
- 2004: Architekturen des Wartens, Galerie AEDES West, Berlin, Germany
- 2005: Architekturen des Wartens, Galerie Elke Dröscher, Hamburg, Germany
- 2006: Wüste am 45. Längengrad, Kunst-Station St. Peter, Cologne, Germany
- 2006: Architekturen des Wartens, Museum Ludwig, Cologne, Germany
- 2006: PAGAN Zeit aus Stein, Galerie Sabine Knust, Munich, Germany
- 2007: Fotografien, Krefelder Kunstverein, Krefeld, Germany
- 2008: presencia y ausencia, Fundación BBK, Bilbao
- 2008: Objectivités - La photographie à Düsseldorf, Musée d´Art Moderne de la Ville de Paris, France (group exhibition)
- 2008: Photographie, Beck & Eggeling new quarters, Düsseldorf, Germany
- 2008: Luz de la Fotografía. Silencio de la Arquitectura, Auditorio de San Francisco, Ávila, Spain
- 2008: Sonnenstand, Bibliotheca Alexandrina, Alexandria, Egypt
- 2008: Tongkonan, Alang und das Haus ohne Rauch, Aedes am Pfefferberg, Berlin, Germany
- 2009: Horizontabschreitung. Arbeiten von Miroslaw Balka und Ursula Schulz-Dornburg, Kunstparterre, Munich, Germany
- 2009: Solar Position, Tristan Hoare Gallery, London
- 2011: Niemandslicht, Kunstmuseum Bochum, Germany
- 2011/2012: Von Medina an die Jordanische Grenze, Pergamonmuseum, Berlin, Germany
- 2013: Fotografien, Galerie Sabine Knust, Munich, Germany
- 2013: Steinschiffe, Kunstmuseum Bochum, Germany
- 2013: Transformed Visions with Mark Ruwedel, Tate Modern, London
- 2013: Kronstadt, Raketenstation Hombroich, Neuss, Germany
- 2014: Bus Stops, Gallery Luisotti, Santa Monica
- 2014: Kuchatov. Architekturen im Atombombentestgebiet, AEDES, Berlin, Germany
- 2014: Structure and Clarity with Charlotte Posenenske, Tate Modern, London
- 2015: Architekturen im Atombombentestgebiet, Galerie Elke Dröscher / Kunstraum Falkenstein, Hamburg, Germany
- 2016: Enso: Ursula Schulz-Dornburg und Taizo Kuroda, Tristan Hoare Gallery, London
- 2017: Auf dem Weg nach Kronstadt, Galerie Elke Dröscher - Kunstraum Falkenstein, Hamburg, Germany
- 2017: Bricks and Mortals, Gallery Luisotti, Santa Monica
- 2018: The Land In-between: Photographs from 1980 to 2012, Städel Museum, Frankfurt, Germany
- 2018: Vorhänge am Markusplatz; Ein orientalisches Zelt auf dem Meer, Raketenstation Hombroich, Neuss, Germany
- 2018: No man's land, British Museum, London
- 2019/2020: Zone Grise/The Land in Between, Maison Européenne de la Photographie, Paris
- 2021: Die Teilung der Welt, Instituto Cervantes, Munich, Germany
- 2021: Verschwundene Landschaften, Aedes Architekturforum, Berlin
- 2022: Austromancy, Gallery Luisotti, Santa Monica
- 2023: Memoryscapes, Large Glass, London
- 2023: Huts, Temples, Castles, Aedes Architecture Forum, Berlin, Germany

== Collections ==
Schulz-Dornburg's work is held in the following public collections:

- Aedes Architecture Forum, Berlin
- Art Institute of Chicago
- Bibliothèque nationale de France
- British Museum
- Buffalo AKG Art Museum
- Getty Research Institute,
- Institut Valencià d'Art Modern
- J. Paul Getty Museum
- Kunstmuseum Bochum
- Kunstsammlung Nordrhein-Westfalen
- Maison européenne de la photographie (MEP)
- Milwaukee Art Museum
- Minneapolis Institute of Art
- Musée d'Art Moderne de Paris
- Museum Ludwig, Cologne
- National Gallery of Art
- National Gallery of Canada
- Pinakothek der Moderne
- Santa Barbara Museum of Art
- Städel Museum
- Tate Modern
- Victoria and Albert Museum
