= Samantha Box =

American photographer

Samantha Box (born 1977) is an American photographer. Box was born in Jamaica.

In 2012, Time Magazine profiled Box's ongoing project of photographing Sylvia's Place, an emergency shelter for homeless LGBT youth in New York City. Her work is included in the collections of the Museum of Fine Arts, Houston and Light Work, Syracuse, New York.
