= Keisha Scarville =

American photographer

- Born: 1975 (age 50–51); Kings, New York, USA
- Education: Rochester Institute of Technology
- Occupation: photographer
- Notable work: Mama's Clothes

Keisha Scarville (born 1975) is an American photographer, living in Brooklyn, New York.

== Early life ==
Scarville was born in Kings, New York to Guyanese parents who had emigrated to New York in the 1960s. She holds a Bachelor of Science degree in photography from the Rochester Institute of Technology.

== Work ==
In the series Mama's Clothes, Scarville creates portraits using her dead mother's clothing, exploring "landscapes and her body to investigate questions of belonging and the impact it has had on her identity." Portraits of her father make up her series Passport (2012–16), black and white passport sized photographs "adorned and reconfigured in myriad ways."

== Collections ==
Scarville's work is held in the following permanent collections:

- Smithsonian American Art Museum
- Florida State University Museum of Art
- Light Work Collection

== Awards ==
On March 12, 2026, the Brooklyn Museum announced that it had awarded Scarville its Uovo Prize. The annual prize is awarded to emerging Brooklyn-based artists. The prize includes "a public installation on the Brooklyn Museum’s Iris Cantor Plaza, a commission for a fifty-by-fifty-foot public art installation on the facade of UOVO’s Brooklyn facility in Bushwick, and a $25,000 unrestricted cash grant."
