= Mohamed Bourouissa =

Algeria-born French photographer

Mohamed Bourouissa (born 1978) is an Algeria-born French photographer, based in Paris. In 2020 Bourouissa won the Deutsche Börse Photography Foundation Prize. His work is held in the collection of the Maison européenne de la photographie, Paris.

== Early life ==
Bourouissa was born in Blida, Algeria. He moved with his family to France when he was five years old and grew up in the suburbs of Paris.

== Publications ==
- Mohamed Bourouissa. Paris: Kamel Mennour, 2017. ISBN 978-2914171632. With texts by Marc Donnadieu, Anna Dezeuze, Amanda Hunt, and Michael Nairn, and a transcript of a conversation between Bourouissa and Okwui Enwezor. In English and French. Exhibition catalogue.
- Périphérique. London: Loose Joints, 2021. With essays in English and French by Taous R. Dahmani and Clément Chéroux. ISBN 978-1-912719-29-7.

== Exhibitions ==
- Urban Riders, Musée d'Art Moderne de Paris, Paris, 2018
- Free Trade, in a Monoprix supermarket, Rencontres d'Arles, Arles, France, 2019. Included work from Périphérique, Shoplifters, and Nous Sommes Halles.
- The Photographers' Gallery, London, 2019/2020, as part of the Deutsche Börse Photography Foundation Prize

== Awards ==
- 2012: Shortlisted, Prix Pictet, for Périphérique
- 2018: Shortlisted, Marcel Duchamp Prize, France
- 2020: Winner, Deutsche Börse Photography Foundation Prize 2020, an award of £30,000, for his exhibition Free Trade at Rencontres d'Arles. The other nominations were Clare Strand, Anton Kusters, and Mark Neville.

== Collections ==
Bourouissa's work is held in the following permanent collection:

- Maison européenne de la photographie, Paris
