= Colin Pantall =

English writer & photographer

Colin Pantall is a writer, photographer and lecturer based in Bath, England. His photography is about childhood and the mythologies of family identity.

A senior lecturer in photography at the University of South Wales in Newport, he writes about photography for British Journal of Photography, Royal Photographic Society's RPS Journal and Photo Eye, and is a photography blogger. His book of photographs, All Quiet on the Home Front, was published in 2017.

== Life and work ==
Pantall gained a BA in philosophy from the University of Bristol in 1986 and a MA in documentary photography from the University of Wales, Newport, in 2006, where he studied under Ken Grant.

He is a senior lecturer in photography at the University of South Wales in Newport, teaching on the documentary, and fashion and advertising courses.

Pantall writes about photography for British Journal of Photography, Royal Photographic Society's RPS Journal and Photo Eye. He has been a photography blogger since 2007. Pete Brook, writing in Wired in 2010 about his blog, said that "Preoccupied with visual culture at large, Pantall draws frequent parallels to literature, television and film. The result is an eclectic exploration of what 'does and doesn't make photography work'."

== Publications ==
=== Publications by Pantall ===
- All Quiet on the Home Front. ICVL Studio, 2017. ISBN 978-1-64136-958-9.

=== Publications with contributions by Pantall ===
- Photographic Portrait Prize 2007. London: National Portrait Gallery, 2007. ISBN 978-1855143883.
- Taylor Wessing Photographic Portrait Prize 2008. London: National Portrait Gallery, 2008. ISBN 978-1855143968. With a brief essay by Ben Okri and interviews with the prize winners by Richard McClure.
- Global photography. Looking at-Looking for. Verucchio, Rimini, Italy: Pazzini, 2009. ISBN 9788862570640. Edited by Massimo Sordi and Steffania Rosl.

== Group exhibitions ==
- 2007: Innocence Now, Witzenhausen gallery, Amsterdam, 5 January – 10 February 2007.
- 2007/2008: Photographic Portrait Prize, National Portrait Gallery, London, 8 November 2007 – 24 February 2008. The Lowry, Salford, Greater Manchester, 5 July – 12 October 2008. Included Pantall's Sofa Portrait #3 from Sofa Series.
- 2008/2009: Taylor Wessing Photographic Portrait Prize, National Portrait Gallery, London, 6 November 2008 – 15 February 2009; Laing Art Gallery, Newcastle, 25 April – 21 June 2009. Included Isabel with Camellia on Easter Sunday.
- 2009: Global photography: Looking at / Looking for, Sifest Photo Festival, Savignano, Italy, 11 September – 4 October 2009. Included Pantall's Sofa Series.
- 2009: Domesticated, Walcot Chapel, Bath, 8–17 October 2009; Post Modern Gallery, Swindon, 5–27 February 2010. Included Pantall's Sofa Series along with work by Christina Bryant, Julia Douglas, Sarah King, Kate Peters and Jem Stiff.
- 2010: Global photography: Looking at / Looking for, Galleria Contemporaneo, Venice, 19 March – 24 April 2010.
