= Mack (publishing) =

Art and photography publishing house

- Status: Active
- Founded: 2010
- Founder: Michael Mack
- Country of origin: United Kingdom
- Headquarters location: London, SE4
- Distribution: Worldwide
- Publication types: Books
- Nonfiction topics: Photography and Arts
- Official website: www.mackbooks.co.uk

Mack (stylised as MACK) is an independent art and photography publishing house based in London. Mack works with established and emerging artists, writers and curators, and cultural institutions, releasing around 40 books per year. The publisher was founded in 2010 in London by Michael Mack.

== Details ==
Mack was founded in 2010 in London by Michael Mack, who previously worked as managing director of Steidl, founding the SteidlMack imprint.

Mack takes part in various art and book fairs, showcasing new titles, participating in talks, and organising artist book signings. These annual events include The London Book Fair in March; AIPAD in NYC in April; LA Art Book Fair in April; PhotoLondon in May; Rencontres d'Arles, in July; the NY Art Book Fair in September; Frankfurt Book Fair in October; Paris Photo in November.

In 2011, Michael Mack was awarded an Honorary Doctorate of Arts by the University of Plymouth for his contribution to art publishing.

== Awards for Mack titles ==
- Deutsche Börse Photography Prize 2009 – won by Paul Graham's a shimmer of possibility.
- Paris Photo/Aperture Foundation 2011 – Best PhotoBook from the last fifteen years – won by Paul Graham's a shimmer of possibility.
- Rencontres d'Arles 2011 Contemporary Book Award – won by Taryn Simon's A Living Man Declared Dead and Other Chapters.
- Rencontres d'Arles 2012 Author Book Award – won by Christian Patterson's Redheaded Peckerwood.
- Deutsche Börse Photography Prize 2013 – won by Adam Broomberg & Oliver Chanarin's War Primer 2.
- Leica Oskar Barnack Award 2014 – won by Martin Kollar's Field Trip.
- ICP Infinity Award 2014 from the International Center of Photography – won by Adam Broomberg & Oliver Chanarin's Holy Bible.
- Paris Photo 2016 Photobook of the Year – won by Gregory Halpern's ZZYZX.
- Paris Photo/Aperture Foundation 2018 Photography Catalogue of the Year – won by Ursula Schulz-Dornburg's The Land in Between.
- Rencontres d'Arles 2018 Photo Text Book Award – won by Adam Broomberg & Oliver Chanarin's War Primer 2.
- Richard Schlagman Art Book Awards 2019 Contemporary Art Award – won by Thomas Demand's The Complete Papers.

== First Book Award ==
In 2012, Mack established the First Book Award, in collaboration with the National Media Museum, Bradford and the Wilson Centre for Photography, London. This annual photography publishing award was open to photographers who had not previously had a book published by a third party publishing house. The call for submissions emphasises a predilection for projects conceived in book form: works that find a voice through the book. Submission was via an array of nominators who were asked to recommend projects. The Award ran until 2021.

=== Winners ===
- 2012: Anne Sophie Merryman, Mrs. Merryman's Collection.
- 2013: Paul Salveson, Between the Shell.
- 2014: Joanna Piotrowska, FROWST.
- 2015: Ciarán Óg Arnold, I went to the worst of bars hoping to get killed. but all I could do was to get drunk again.
- 2016: Sofia Borges, The Swamp.
- 2017: Emmanuelle Andrianjafy, Nothing's in Vain.
- 2018: Hayahisa Tomiyasu, TTP.
- 2019: Jerome Ming, Oobanken.
- 2020: Damian Heinisch, 45.
- 2021: Marvel Harris, Marvel.
