= Chris McCaw =

American photographer

Chris McCaw (born 1971) is an American photographer whose work is held in many public collections.

== Life and photography ==
McCaw was born in Daly City, California, in 1971. Growing up, he was part of the Daly City punk/skateboarding scene in the 1980s. He has a BFA from the Academy of Art College in San Francisco.

McCaw is known for his large-format homemade cameras in which he uses expired gelatin silver photo paper and long exposures to make solarized paper negatives which often include the burned path of the sun within the frame, in a series named Sunburn. McCaw travels to remote places to capture different apparent movements of the sun, including the Arctic Circle in Alaska, the Galápagos Islands and the Mojave Desert. McCaw's earlier work used a 7×17 inch view camera to create large-format negatives from which he made platinum prints. Projects following Sunburn include work with a modified Cirkut camera, resulting in exposures that can take more than 24 hours. A series titled Poli-optic employs a homemade camera with a grid of lenses. Finally, the series Heliograph includes work in which there are multiple exposures of the sun on the same paper negative.

=== Sunburn ===
McCaw's best known project is titled Sunburn. The Metropolitan Museum of Art writes about the series that:

In 2003 McCaw, a photographer based in San Francisco, began taking pictures of the sun. Using large-format cameras that he builds himself, McCaw works outdoors, usually in the desert or by the sea. Instead of film, he places photographic paper in the camera so that each picture he creates is a unique paper negative. His exposures often last four hours or more. McCaw calls these works "Sunburns" because the rays of the sun, magnified by the camera's lens, actually scorch the paper negative, sometimes burning all the way through the paper base. The intensity of the light also causes solarization, reversing the tonal values so that the negative print appears as a positive image.

== Publications ==
=== Publications by McCaw ===
- Sunburn. Richmond, VA: Candela, 2012. ISBN 978-0-9845739-2-9.
- Marking Time. Seoul, South Korea: Datz Press, 2023. ISBN 978-89-97605-62-0.

=== Publications with others ===
- Virginia Heckert. Light, Paper, Process. Los Angeles, CA: J. Paul Getty Museum, 2014. ISBN 9781606064375. Includes work by Alison Rossiter, Marco Breuer, James Welling, Lisa Oppenheim, McCaw, John Chiara, and Matthew Brandt who "push light-sensitive photographic papers and chemical processing beyond their limits."

== Awards ==
- Guggenheim Fellowship in Photography, 2026
- Emerging Icon Award, Eastman Museum, 2014

== Collections ==
McCaw's work is held in the following permanent collections:

- Berkeley Art Museum and Pacific Film Archive, Berkeley, CA
- Columbus Museum of Art, Columbus, OH
- Crocker Art Museum, Sacramento, CA Museum Publicity
- Chrysler Museum of Art, Norfolk, VA
- Davison Art Center, Wesleyan University, Middletown, CT
- George Eastman House International Museum of Photography, Rochester, NY
- Harry Ransom Center, University of Texas at Austin, Austin, TX
- J Paul Getty Museum, Los Angeles, CA
- Los Angeles County Museum of Art, Los Angeles, CA
- Metropolitan Museum of Art, New York, NY
- Monterey Museum of Art, Monterey, CA
- Museum of Fine Arts, Houston, TX
- National Gallery of Art, Washington, DC
- Nelson-Atkins Museum of Art, Kansas City, MO
- North Carolina Museum of Art, Raleigh, NC
- Philadelphia Museum of Art, Philadelphia, PA
- Portland Art Museum, Portland, OR
- Princeton University Art Museum, Princeton, NJ
- Santa Barbara Museum of Art, Santa Barbara, CA
- Smithsonian American Art Museum, Washington, DC
- University of Oregon, Jordan Schnitzer Museum of Art, Eugene, OR
- Victoria and Albert Museum, London, England
- Whitney Museum of American Art, New York, NY

== See also ==
- Hiroshi Yamazaki
