= Lucas Foglia =

American fine-art photographer

- Born: 1983 (age 42–43); Long Island, New York, U.S.
- Education: Brown University (BA); Yale University (MFA)
- Known for: Photography
- Awards: Guggenheim Fellowship (2024)
- Website: lucasfoglia.com

Lucas Foglia (born 1983) is an American fine-art photographer who makes stories about people in nature. His exhibitions and books combine documentary realism, intimate portraiture, and tableau. Critics have connected his photographs to the legacy of the New Topographics, noting both their attention to human-altered environments and their empathetic engagement with the people depicted.

Foglia grew up on a small farm on Long Island, New York. He received a BA in Art Semiotics from Brown University in 2005 and an MFA in photography from Yale University in 2010. His 2024 Guggenheim Fellowship supported Constant Bloom, a series tracing the longest known butterfly migration as a metaphor for human connections across international borders.

Foglia's prints have been exhibited and collected by institutions including Foam Fotografiemuseum Amsterdam, the International Center of Photography, the Museum of Contemporary Art Denver, the San Francisco Museum of Modern Art, and the Victoria and Albert Museum. He has published six books: A Natural Order (2012), Frontcountry (2014), Human Nature (2017), Summer After (2021), Living on Lava (2024), and Constant Bloom (2025).

Combining art and advocacy, Foglia shares his photographs with the people he portrays, news organizations, and NGOs.

== Early work ==
=== Summer After ===
Summer After records New York City in 2002, during the first summer after the September 11 attacks. At nineteen, shortly after moving from his family's farm on Long Island to Manhattan, Foglia walked across the city's five boroughs, asking people if they would like a portrait. Made while workers were still removing debris from the former World Trade Center site, the series conveys the city’s resilience and unity.

== Projects ==
=== A Natural Order ===
From 2006 through 2010, Foglia traveled throughout the southeastern United States befriending, photographing, and interviewing a network of people who left cities and suburbs to live off the grid. Motivated by environmental concerns, religious beliefs, or the global economic recession, they chose to build their homes from local materials, obtain their water from nearby springs, and hunt, gather, or grow their own food. No one lived in complete isolation. They chose parts of society to bring with them.

=== Frontcountry ===
From 2006 to 2013, Foglia photographed in the rural American West. Frontcountry explores how people live in a landscape that is famous for being wild. Two industries dominate the local economy: ranching and mining. While the ranchers Foglia met struggled to survive years of drought and overgrazing, almost anyone could find a job at the mines. Coal, oil, natural gas, and gold were booming.

=== Human Nature ===
Photographed between 2008 and 2019, Human Nature is a series of photographic stories about humans and the natural world. Each story is set in a different ecosystem: city, forest, farm, desert, ice field, ocean, and volcano. The photographs explore the relationship between people and wild place.

=== Living on Lava ===
Living on Lava portrays communities on Hawaiʻi Island whose homes and daily lives are shaped by active volcanic terrain. Made in 2016 and 2017, the photographs consider adaptation, loss, and renewal in a landscape where lava continually remakes the ground beneath people's feet.

=== Constant Bloom ===
Constant Bloom follows the discovery of the longest known butterfly migration, spanning Europe, Africa, and the Middle East. Developed from 2016 to 2026, Foglia's photographs trace both the path of painted lady butterflies and the people they encounter, offering an allegory for an interconnected and changing world.

== Publications ==
- A Natural Order. Nazraeli Press, 2012.
- Frontcountry. Nazraeli Press, 2014.
- Human Nature. Nazraeli Press, 2017.
- Summer After. Stanley/Barker, 2021.
- Living on Lava. Nazraeli Press, 2024.
- Constant Bloom. Nazraeli Press, 2025.
- Forrest Gander, Core Samples from the World. New Directions, 2011. Photographs by Foglia, Raymond Meeks, and Graciela Iturbide.

== Awards and honors ==
- 2006: Aaron Siskind Fellowship in Photography, Rhode Island State Council on the Arts.
- 2007: Artist-in-Residence, Light Work, Syracuse, New York.
- 2008: Photography Now, Center for Photography at Woodstock.
- 2009: PDN 30.
- 2010: Norman Joondeph Prize, Yale School of Art; juried by Robert Storr.
- 2012: Shortlisted, Paris Photo–Aperture Foundation PhotoBook Awards, for A Natural Order.
- 2014: Foam Talent, Foam Fotografiemuseum Amsterdam.
- 2014: Individual Photographer's Fellowship, Aaron Siskind Foundation.
- 2018: Artist-in-Residence, Headlands Center for the Arts.
- 2019: National Geographic Explorer.
- 2019: Shortlisted, Prix Pictet, Hope.
- 2024: Guggenheim Fellowship, Photography.

== Selected solo exhibitions ==
- 2012: A Natural Order, Rencontres d'Arles, Arles, France.
- 2013: A Natural Order, Museum of Contemporary Art Denver, Denver, Colorado.
- 2015: Frontcountry, Kunstmuseum Magdeburg, Magdeburg, Germany.
- 2016: Frontcountry, Cortona On The Move, Cortona, Italy.
- 2018: Human Nature, Foam Fotografiemuseum Amsterdam, Amsterdam, the Netherlands.
- 2018: Human Nature, Museum of Contemporary Photography, Chicago, Illinois.
- 2025: Constant Bloom, Fotomuseum Den Haag, The Hague, the Netherlands.

== Selected group exhibitions ==
- 2013: A Different Kind of Order: The ICP Triennial, International Center of Photography, New York, New York.
- 2014: A History of Photography, Victoria and Albert Museum, London, United Kingdom.
- 2018: Ansel Adams in Our Time, Museum of Fine Arts, Boston, Boston, Massachusetts.
- 2019: Prix Pictet: Hope, Victoria and Albert Museum, London, United Kingdom.
- 2023: Sea Change, San Francisco Museum of Modern Art, San Francisco, California.
- 2023: A Long Arc: Photography and the American South since 1845, High Museum of Art, Atlanta, Georgia.
- 2026: Beneath the Surface: Mining and American Photography, National Gallery of Art, Washington, D.C.

== Collections ==
- Art Collection Deutsche Börse, Frankfurt, Germany.
- Berkeley Art Museum and Pacific Film Archive, Berkeley, California.
- Bowdoin College Museum of Art, Brunswick, Maine.
- Cantor Arts Center at Stanford University, Stanford, California.
- Center for Photography at Woodstock, Kingston, New York.
- Cincinnati Art Museum, Cincinnati, Ohio.
- Cleveland Clinic's Arts & Medicine Institute, Cleveland, Ohio.
- Cleveland Museum of Art, Cleveland, Ohio.
- David Winton Bell Gallery at Brown University, Providence, Rhode Island.
- Denver Art Museum, Denver, Colorado.
- Fine Arts Museums of San Francisco, San Francisco, California.
- Fitchburg Art Museum, Fitchburg, Massachusetts.
- Foam Fotografiemuseum Amsterdam, Amsterdam, the Netherlands.
- Harvard Art Museums, Cambridge, Massachusetts.
- High Museum of Art, Atlanta, Georgia.
- International Center of Photography, New York, New York.
- Kunstmuseum Magdeburg, Magdeburg, Germany.
- Light Work, Syracuse, New York.
- Los Angeles County Museum of Art, Los Angeles, California.
- Milwaukee Art Museum, Milwaukee, Wisconsin.
- Museum of Contemporary Photography, Chicago, Illinois.
- Museum of Fine Arts, Boston, Boston, Massachusetts.
- Museum of Fine Arts, Houston, Houston, Texas.
- New York Public Library, New York, New York.
- Philadelphia Museum of Art, Philadelphia, Pennsylvania.
- Portland Art Museum, Portland, Oregon.
- Rhode Island School of Design Museum, Providence, Rhode Island.
- San Francisco Museum of Modern Art, San Francisco, California.
- Sheldon Museum of Art, Lincoln, Nebraska.
- Snite Museum of Art at the University of Notre Dame, Notre Dame, Indiana.
- Stanford Libraries, Stanford, California.
- University of Texas at Dallas, Richardson, Texas.
- Victoria and Albert Museum, London, United Kingdom.
- Virginia Museum of Fine Arts, Richmond, Virginia.
