= Ed Panar =

American photographer and bookmaker (born 1976)

- Born: 1976 (age 49–50); Johnstown, Pennsylvania, U.S.
- Education: Indiana University of Pennsylvania (BA); Cranbrook Academy of Art (MFA)
- Known for: Photography
- Awards: Guggenheim Fellowship (2022)
- Website: edpanar.com

Ed Panar (born 1976) is an American photographer and bookmaker based in Pittsburgh, Pennsylvania. He is known for photobooks and photographic series that explore encounters with animals, overlooked landscapes, and the everyday environment. His work is held in the collections of the High Museum of Art, the Museum of Contemporary Photography, and Pier 24 Photography, among others.

== Early life and education ==
Panar was born in 1976 in Johnstown, Pennsylvania. He earned a B.A. from Indiana University of Pennsylvania in 1998 and an M.F.A. in photography from the Cranbrook Academy of Art in 2005. An interview in Popular Photography also discusses his education and early interest in photography.

== Career ==
Panar's series Animals That Saw Me depicts unplanned encounters with non-human subjects, often capturing animals looking directly at the photographer. He co-founded Spaces Corners, a photography bookshop and pr

Panar's book In the Vicinity (2018) explores landscapes and communities in Mendocino County, California. In 2019 he began Walking Through Walker Evans, inspired by Evans's 1935 photograph of homes in Johnstown; writer David Campany describes the project as a dialogue between photographic history and contemporary practice. In 2013, Panar moved from New York City back to Pittsburgh, a choice he discussed in relation to prioritizing creative time over income.

== Books ==
- Golden Palms. Atlanta: J&L Books, 2007. ISBN 978-0974690865.
- Same Difference. Kutztown: Gottlund Verlag, 2010.
- Salad Days. Kutztown: Gottlund Verlag, 2011–2012.
- Animals That Saw Me, Volume One. Los Angeles: The Ice Plant, 2011.
- Nothing Changes if Nothing Changes. Pittsburgh: Spaces Corners; Los Angeles: The Ice Plant, 2013. (24 pp.)
- City Atlas. Pittsburgh: Spaces Corners, 2013.
- Sun Stood Still. Pittsburgh: Spaces Corners, 2013.
- April Flowers. Pittsburgh: Spaces Corners, 2015.
- Falling Asleep. Self-published, 2015.
- Animals That Saw Me, Volume Two. Los Angeles: The Ice Plant, 2016. (essay by Timothy Morton).
- Back East. Los Angeles: Deadbeat Club Press, 2017. Box of 26 color postcards; ed. of 300.
- In the Vicinity. Los Angeles: Deadbeat Club Press, 2018. ISBN 978-0-9998298-1-3.
- Winter Nights, Walking. Amsterdam: Fw:Books & Spaces Corners, 2023. ISBN 978-90-833459-1-8.

=== Selected contributions ===
- Both Sides of Sunset: Photographing Los Angeles. New York: Metropolis Books, 2015.
- Only the Good Ones: The Snapshot Aesthetic Revisited. Prague: Galerie Rudolfinum, 2014.
- Photography Now!. Tokyo/Amsterdam: IMA / Idea Books, 2014.

== Selected exhibitions ==
- OUTS, Filter Photo Festival, Chicago, 2022
- Historic Sight, Gallery Closed, Pittsburgh, 2021
- Looking Back, Pier 24 Photography, San Francisco, 2019–2021
- The Grain of the Present, Pier 24 Photography, San Francisco, 2017–2018
- We Look At Animals Because, SAVAC, Toronto, 2018
- Look Up at the Sky, EspaiDos, Terrassa, Spain, 2017
- ZOOZOOZOO, Kasseler Kunstverein, Kassel, Germany, 2016
- The Golden Hour, Silver Eye Center for Photography, Pittsburgh, 2015
- The Photographer's Playspace, Aperture Gallery, New York, NY, 2014–2015
- Only the Good Ones: The Snapshot Aesthetic Revisited, Galerie Rudolfinum, Prague, 2014
- A Different Kind of Order, ICP Triennial, International Center of Photography, New York, 2013
- DIY: Photographers & Books, Cleveland Museum of Art, 2012
- Animals That Saw Me, Spaces Corners, Pittsburgh, 2011
- In Sight, Museum of Contemporary Photography, Chicago, 2006

== Awards and honors ==
- Creative Development Award, Heinz Endowments, 2022
- Guggenheim Fellowship, 2022
- Pennsylvania Council on the Arts Fellowship, 2007
- Greater Pittsburgh Arts Council, Artists Opportunity Grant, 2007

== Recognition ==
- Nothing Changes If Nothing Changes selected by Michael Mack as one of the "Best Books 2013," The Eyes (France)
- Nothing Changes If Nothing Changes included in Charlotte Cotton's "Best Books of the 2010s," IMA Tokyo
- Included in 10×10 American Photobooks (2013)
- Animals That Saw Me included in Alec Soth's "Top 20 Photobooks of 2011"
- Animals That Saw Me named to TIME LightBox "Best of 2011: The Photobooks We Loved"
- Animals That Saw Me selected by Darius Himes for Photo-Eye's Best of 2011 Photobooks

== Collections ==
Panar's work is included in the following permanent collections (alphabetical):

- High Museum of Art, Atlanta, Georgia
- Museum of Contemporary Photography, Chicago, Illinois
- Pier 24 Photography, San Francisco, California
- San Francisco Museum of Modern Art, San Francisco, California
- Midwest Photographers Project, Museum of Contemporary Photography, Chicago, Illinois (2005–2009)
