= Daniel Postaer =

American photographer (born 1978)

- Born: November 23, 1978 (age 47); Chicago, Illinois, U.S.
- Education: San Francisco Art Institute
- Known for: Photography

Daniel Lee Postaer (born November 23, 1978) is an American photographer whose work explores identity, cultural memory, and the transformation of contemporary cities. Based in California, he is known for long-term projects in San Francisco and China, including the series Boomtown and Mother’s Land. His photographs have been shown internationally at venues such as Pier 24 Photography in San Francisco and Longmen Art Projects in Shanghai. Works by Postaer are held in the collections of the Metropolitan Museum of Art, the San Francisco Museum of Modern Art, the High Museum of Art, and Pier 24 Photography.

== Early life and education ==
Postaer was born in Chicago, Illinois. He studied photography at the San Francisco Art Institute, where he became immersed in the Bay Area’s photographic tradition. While at SFAI he studied under Henry Wessel, whose approach to observation and the everyday had a lasting impact on his practice.

== Career ==
In 2014 Postaer began the long-term series Mother’s Land, which developed over a decade and was exhibited internationally, including at Longmen Art Projects in Shanghai. He has also photographed extensively in San Francisco for the series Boomtown, which documents urban change in the city.

His work has been included in major group exhibitions at Pier 24 Photography, such as This Land and Looking Forward.

== Style and influences ==
Postaer’s work has been situated within the tradition of lyrical documentary, a term popularized by Walker Evans, for its blending of observation and poetic sensibility. Critics and writers have noted his pursuit of light and time, drawing comparisons to the photographs of Fan Ho in Hong Kong and to the observational practice of Henry Wessel in the American West. Postaer has described his projects, particularly Mother’s Land, as a way of linking personal and cultural memory across generations.

== Awards ==
- 2025 — Winner of the LensCulture New Visions Award in the "Place" category for Mother’s Land.

== Collections ==
Postaer’s work is included in the permanent collections of:

- Asian Art Museum, San Francisco
- Crocker Art Museum, Sacramento
- Fine Arts Museums of San Francisco
- High Museum of Art, Atlanta
- Metropolitan Museum of Art, New York
- Pier 24 Photography, San Francisco
- San Francisco Museum of Modern Art

== Selected exhibitions ==
- 2025 — LensCulture New Discoveries at Photo London 2025, Somerset House, London.
- 2025 — LensCulture Exhibition at Leica, New York, featuring New Visions Award winners (including Postaer).
- 2022–2023 — Looking Forward, Pier 24 Photography, San Francisco
- 2018 — The River: Frogtown Art Walk (Pop-Up Exhibition), Los Angeles.
- 2018–2019 — This Land, Pier 24 Photography, San Francisco
- 2017 — Motherland: Photographs 2014–2016, Longmen Art Projects, Shanghai.
- 2017 — Boomtown, PhotoFairs Shanghai, Shanghai
- 2016 — Homage, Sangha Gallery, Suzhou
- 2016 — Summer Group Show, EUQINOMprojects, San Francisco.
- 2016 — Motherland: Day One, Art {Currents} Space, Busan
- 2015 — Manifest Justice (Group Show), Los Angeles
- 2012 — Pretty Raw, curated by Linda Connor & Gabriele Rothemann; Expositur Vordere Zollamtstraße 3, Vienna.
- 2015 — Boomtown: Pictures of San Francisco, SFAI MFA Thesis Show, San Francisco

== Books ==
- Mother’s Land. Los Angeles: Deadbeat Club Press, 2025. With an essay by Christopher McCall.

== Press and reviews ==
Postaer’s photography has been noted for its attention to urban transformation, light, and the intersections of personal and cultural memory.

- Writing in the San Francisco Chronicle, Sam Whiting profiled Postaer’s early street photographs of San Francisco, which drew notice while he was still a student and were later acquired by Pier 24 Photography.
- In a review of This Land (2018), KQED Arts described how Postaer’s San Francisco photographs conveyed the “urban sublime,” juxtaposing the city’s extreme wealth with its visible dispossession.
- Writing in the San Francisco Examiner on the exhibition Looking Forward (2022), critic Max Blue highlighted Postaer’s ability to capture “the jarring juxtapositions of contemporary San Francisco.”
- LensCulture highlighted Postaer’s long-term project Mother’s Land (2025) for its blending of staged dioramas and unscripted scenes, describing the series as an exploration of memory, identity, and generational legacy in China.
- The Los Angeles Daily News noted his Los Angeles work in coverage of the Frogtown Art Walk (2018), describing his use of the L.A. River as a recurring subject.
