= Daniel Gordon (artist) =

American artist (born 1980)

- Born: 1980 (age 45–46); Boston, Massachusetts
- Education: BA Bard College; MFA Yale School of Art
- Known for: Photography; Still life Portraiture
- Awards: Foam Paul Huf Award, 2014

Daniel Gordon (born 1980) is an American artist who lives and works in Brooklyn, New York.

== Early life and education ==
Gordon was born in Boston, Massachusetts in 1980, and grew up in San Francisco, California. In 2003 he received a BA from Bard College and in 2006 he received an MFA in Photography from the Yale School of Art. He lives and works in Brooklyn, NY.

== Work ==
=== Style and Process ===
Gordon is best known for producing colorful photographic portraits and still lifes made from constructed tableaus. Using a layered and almost circular process, Gordon creates temporary sculptures made from images mined from the internet that are printed, cutout, and remade into three dimensional objects. Then, these objects, are staged before colorful or patterned backgrounds with layered and altered shadows, and photographed. For many years, Gordon created these images using large-format cameras and film, but during the COVID-19 pandemic in 2020, made the switch to using a digital camera. Gordon's process when applied to the human form renders fleshy and fragmented results that “stimulate[s] both attraction and repulsion.” His portraits depict busts in profile, and at times more confrontational figures. These almost anonymous amalgamations have been compared to Frankenstein's monster. In his earlier years, Gordon explained how he used his constructed still-lives to try and "mimic reality" which he now has less of a focus in his artistic career. Gordon's images reveal their own making, he leaves hot glue streaks and the rough textures of torn paper in the images. “I’m more interested in…showing my hand and letting people see the imperfection,” the artist says.

=== Notable Series ===
Gordon's still lifes feature potted house plants, fruits, vegetables, and vases. These compositions, which are often printed at larger-than-life scale, straddle the line between real and unreal, representing space as both two and three-dimensional at the same time. The resulting photographs combine aspects of sculpture, painting and collage. His engagement with the still-life genre and use of color has inspired comparisons to the works of Paul Cézanne, Henri Matisse, and Dutch still-life painting.

Beginning in 2014, Gordon began exhibiting works from his screen selections series. These works are made from digital selections of Gordon's still lifes that are then blown-up and distorted, then used to create a repeated pattern. The resulting photographs, printed on canvas, resemble abstract paintings.

=== Murals ===
In 2021, Gordon debuted his first public art commission at the Rose Kennedy Greenway in Boston, Massachusetts. The exhibition featured a large-scale mural, several photographs, a twelve-foot sculpture of a vase of blue poppies, and flag-like banners. The handpainted mural is a recreation from Gordon's still-life series and stands at 70x76 feet. The exhibition remained on view until May 2022.

=== Sculpture ===
In his 2023 solo exhibition Free Transform at Kasmin Gallery in New York City, Gordon displayed his sculptures alongside his photographs for the first time. Gordon also created sculptural work in his Orange Sunrise with Flowers, Fruit, and Vessels Exhibition. These sculpted vases, urns, and vessels were crafted based on historical pottery that the artist frequently came across in his practice. Ink-jet prints are built up in a collage style to recreate the overall composition. The sculptures are meant to function separate from the artists photography. Their purpose is to serve as a three-dimensional representation of the link between physical and visual information.

== Exhibitions ==
Selected Solo Exhibitions

- Orange Sunrise with Flowers, Fruit, and Vessels, Nazarian / Curcio, Los Angeles, CA (2024)
- Free Transform, Kasmin, New York (2023)
- Daniel Gordon on the Greenway, Rose Kennedy Greenway, Boston, MA (2021–22)
- Green Apples and Boots, Huxley-Parlour, London, UK (2021)
- Daniel Gordon: Hue and Saturate, Houston Center for Photography, Houston, TX (2019)
- Blue Room, James Fuentes, New York (2018)
- Lemons, Onestar Press, Paris, France (2018)
- Selective Color, M+B Gallery, Los Angeles, CA (2017)
- New Canvas, James Fuentes, New York (2017)
- Hand, Select & Invert Layer, Bolte Lang, Zürich, Switzerland (2016)
- Shadows, Patterns, Pears, Foam Museum, Amsterdam, Netherlands(2014)
- Screen Selections and Still Lifes, Wallspace, New York, NY (2014)

Selected Group Exhibitions

- Cut! Paper Play in Contemporary Photography, J. Paul Getty Museum, Los Angeles, CA (2018)
- Secondhand, Pier 24, San Francisco, CA (2014)
- Greater New York 2010, MoMA PS1, Long Island City, NY (2010)
- New Photography 2009, Museum of Modern Art, New York, NY (2009)

== Publications ==
- New Canvas, Chose Commune, Marseille, France (2022)
- Houseplants, Aperture, New York, NY (2019)
- Spaces, Faces, Tables and Legs, Onestar Press, Paris, France (2018)
- Intermissions, Onestar Press, Paris, France (2017)
- Still Life with Onions and Mackerel, Onestar Press, Paris, France (2014)
- Still Lifes, Portraits, and Parts, Mörel Books, London, UK (2013)
- Flowers and Shadows, Onestar Press, Paris, France (2011)
- Flying Pictures, powerHouse Books, Brooklyn, NY (2009)

== Public collections ==
- The Museum of Modern Art
- Foam Photography Museum
- Pier 24
- Solomon R. Guggenheim Museum
- VandenBroek Foundation
- Cleveland Clinic
- Hiscox Collection
- JP Morgan Chase Art Collection
