= Awoiska van der Molen =

Dutch photographer

Awoiska van der Molen (born 1972) is a Dutch photographer, living in Amsterdam. She has produced three books of black and white landscape photographs, made in remote places. Van der Molen has been shortlisted for the Deutsche Börse Photography Foundation Prize and the Prix Pictet, and her work is held in the collections of the Huis Marseille, Museum for Photography and the Victoria and Albert Museum.

== Education ==
Van der Molen studied architecture and design at Academie Minerva in Groningen, Netherlands, then photography both there and at Hunter College, City University of New York, New York City. In 2003 she gained an MFA in photography at Academy of Art and Design St. Joost in Breda, Netherlands.

== Work ==
Between 2000 and 2003, van der Molen made portraits of charismatic women she met on the streets of Manhattan, later switching to people judged by different criteria. After that she turned to photographing anonymous buildings at the edge of the city. Since 2009, she has concentrated on the natural world, travelling alone to remote places in order to make the work. She makes black and white prints in her own darkroom. Van der Molen's first book, Sequester (2014), "photographed throughout the whole of Europe" including the volcanic Canary Islands, contains monochromatic "landscapes, at times abstractly rendered to the point of dissolving into abstractions [. . . ] often obliterating all sense of the physical scale that was in front of the camera, many of them using very narrow ranges of tonality, from the blackest black to maybe a dark grey". Blanco (2017) contains photographs of desolate landscapes and trees. The Living Mountain (2020) is "a book about land, solitude and the planet we inhabit." Sean O'Hagan and Jörg Colberg have praised the quality of her prints.

== Publications ==
=== Books of work by van der Molen ===
- Sequester. Amsterdam: FW, 2014. ISBN 978-94-90119-29-4. Edition of 750 copies.
  - Second edition. Edition of 2000 copies.
- Blanco. Amsterdam: FW, 2017. ISBN 978-94-90119-48-5. With a text by Arjen Mulder. Edition of 1500 copies.
- The Living Mountain. Amsterdam: FW, 2020. ISBN 978-94-90119-88-1.
- The Humanness of Our Lonely Selves. Amsterdam: FW, 2024. ISBN 978-9083345987.

=== Publications with contributions by van der Molen ===
- De laatste fotograaf?. Breda, Netherlands: AKV/St. Joost, 2009.
- Quickscan #01. Rotterdam, Netherlands: Nederlands Fotomuseum, 2010. Edited by Frits Gierstberg.
- Hyeres 26th International Festival Photography catalogue. 2011. Edited by Raphaelle Stopin.
- Alt+1000 High Altitude. By Nathalie Herschdorfer. 2011.
- Fotoverhalen collection catalogue. The Hague, Netherlands: Fotomusem Den Haag, 2014. ISBN 9789462260177.
- The Marseillaise collection catalogue. Fotomuseum Huis Marseille, 2014.
- Hariban Award 2014. Kyoto: Benrido Collotype Atelier, 2014. With text in Japanese and English. Edition of 150 copies.
- Object Onder / Object Below Sanders Collection. Amsterdam: Pieter & Marieke Sanders, 2015. ISBN 9783863358334.
- The Grain of the Present. San Francisco: Pier 24 Photography, 2017. With a text by Kim Beil. ISBN 9781597110006.
- Deutsche Börse Photography Foundation Prize. 2017. ISBN 9780957618886.
- Failed Images: Photography and its Counter-Practices. Leiden: E.J. van Alphen, 2019. ISBN 9789492095459.
- Into the Woods: Trees in Photography. London: Thames & Hudson, 2019. ISBN 978-0500480533.

== Exhibitions ==
=== Solo exhibitions ===
- Blanco, Foam Fotografiemuseum Amsterdam, 2016.
- Status, Casemore Kirkeby, San Francisco, 2018.
- Am schwarzen Himmelsrund, Annet Gelink Gallery, Amsterdam, 2019.
- Solo exhibition, Museum Kranenburgh, Bergen, 2019.
- The Humanness of Our Lonely Selves, Huis Marseille, Museum for Photography, Amsterdam, June 22 – October 13, 2024.

=== Group exhibitions ===
- Into the Woods: Trees in Photography, Victoria and Albert Museum, London, 2018
- Collected, Pier 24 Photography, San Francisco, 2016–2019
- Looking Back, Pier 24 Photography, San Francisco, 2021–2023

== Collections ==
- Foam Fotografiemuseum Amsterdam, Amsterdam
- Huis Marseille, Museum for Photography, Amsterdam: 4 prints (as of November 2020)
- FoMu, Antwerp
- Fotomuseum Den Haag, The Hague
- ING Collection
- Museum of Photography, Seoul, Seoul
- Nederlands Fotomuseum, Rotterdam
- Pier 24 Photography, San Francisco
- Stedelijk Museum Amsterdam, Amsterdam
- Victoria and Albert Museum, London: a set of 8 collotype prints (as of November 2020)

== Awards ==
- 2014: Grand Prize, Hariban Award, Benrido Collotype Atelier, Kyoto, Japan
- 2017: Larry Sultan Photography Award, Pier 24 Photography and McEvoy Foundation for the Arts, San Francisco, Califnrnia
- 2017: Shortlisted, Deutsche Börse Photography Foundation Prize, London, for her exhibition Blanco at Foam Fotografiemuseum Amsterdam
- 2019: Shortlisted, Prix Pictet, Geneva
