= Prix Pictet =

International photography award

- Native name: Pictet Prize
- Description: Photography and sustainability
- Country: International (Switzerland)
- Presented by: Pictet Group
- Reward: 100,000 Swiss francs
- Website: http://www.prixpictet.com

The Prix Pictet (Pictet prize) is an international award in photography. It was founded in 2008 by the Geneva-based Pictet Group with the mandate to use the power of photography to communicate messages about sustainability to a global audience. Its goal is to uncover photography of the highest order, applied to current social and environmental challenges. With the participation of over 4,700 photographers, the prize is judged by an independent jury and carries a prize of 100,000 Swiss francs.

Since 2008 the ten cycles of the Prix Pictet have been shown in more than 100 exhibitions across 25 countries with visitor numbers of over 550,000. The ten Prix Pictet winners are Benoit Aquin, Nadav Kander, Mitch Epstein, Luc Delahaye, Michael Schmidt, Valérie Belin, Richard Mosse, Joana Choumali, Sally Mann and Gauri Gill.

== Process ==
Entry to the Prix Pictet is by nomination. As of November 2023, there were over 300 Prix Pictet nominators, a group of industry experts from around the world consisting of photographers, gallerists, agency heads, academics, authors, publishers, curators, photography foundations and others. Each nominated photographer is asked to submit a series of up to ten images, coherently defined and focused on the theme of the award.

The Prix Pictet was first awarded in 2008 and operates on a cycle of about 18 months. Past themes have been Water, Earth, Growth, Power, Consumption, Disorder, Space, Hope, Fire and currently Human. From May 2014 the prize has been presented in partnership with the Victoria and Albert Museum in London and (for two cycles) the Musée d'Art Moderne de la Ville de Paris.

The judges do not discriminate between photographs of different genres, or make assumptions about the types of audience for any class of photograph. Judging takes place in two stages - a conference to determine the shortlist, followed by a review of works by the shortlisted artists at an exhibition. Sir David King has been Chairman of the Prix Pictet jury since 2010.

The winner of the Prix Pictet receives a cash prize of CHF 100,000, announced at an opening ceremony of the exhibition of shortlisted artists.

== Exhibition ==
An exhibition of the shortlisted portfolios for each cycle of the Prix Pictet tours the world, reaching over a dozen countries during the touring period. In this way the Prix Pictet presents the work of the shortlisted photographers, and the sustainability issues they highlight, to a wide international audience.

A book to accompany each cycle of the award is also published, featuring work by each of the shortlisted artists along with images from the wider group of nominees. It also includes essays by established writers on the theme of the prize.

== Commission ==
For the first five cycles of the award the Prix Pictet ran a commission in association with a charity partner. This project enabled a nominated photographer to visit a specific country or region and create a photography report on a live sustainability issue. Past charity partners have been WaterAid in 2008, SEED Madagascar in 2009, The Tusk Trust in 2011, Medair in 2013 and OneAction in 2015. This commission has been discontinued.

== Themes and winners ==
Year	Theme	Winner	Also shortlisted	Commission
2008	Water	Benoit Aquin, The Chinese "dust bowl"	Jesús Abad Colorado, Landscapes and battles; Edward Burtynsky, Oil fields; Thomas Joshua Cooper, The world's edge: The Atlantic basin project; Sebastian Copeland, Antarctica: The global warning; Christian Cravo, Waters of hope, rivers of tears; Lynn Davis, Ice 1988–2007; Carl De Keyzer, Moments before the flood; Reza Deghati, War and peace; Susan Derges, Eden and the observer and the observed; Malcolm Hutcheson, Lahore's waste water problem; Chris Jordan, In Katrina's wake: Portraits of loss from an unnatural disaster; David Maisel, Terminal mirage and the lake project; Mary Mattingly, Second nature; Robert Polidori, After the flood; Roman Signer; Jules Spinatsch, Snow management; Munem Wasif, Water tragedy: Climate refugee of Bangladesh	Munem Wasif, Salt water tears: Lives left behind in Satkhira, Bangladesh
2009	Earth	Nadav Kander, Yangtze, the long river	Darren Almond, Fullmoon; Christopher Anderson, Capitolio; Sammy Baloji, Memory; Edward Burtynsky, Quarries; Andreas Gursky; Naoya Hatakeyama, Blast; Ed Kashi, Curse of the black gold: 50 Years of oil in the Niger delta; Abbas Kowsari, Shade of earth; Yao Lu, New mountain and water; Edgar Martins, The diminishing present; Chris Steele-Perkins, Mount Fuji	Ed Kashi, Madagascar: A land out of balance
2011	Growth	Mitch Epstein, American power	Christian Als, Kibera: The shadow city; Edward Burtynsky, Oil; Stéphane Couturier, Melting point; Chris Jordan, Midway: Message from the gyre; Yeondoo Jung, Evergreen Tower; Vera Lutter; Nyaba Léon Ouédraogo, The hell of copper; Taryn Simon, An American index of the hidden and unfamiliar; Thomas Struth, Paradise; Guy Tillim, Petros village; Michael Wolf, Architecture of density	Chris Jordan, Ushirikiano
2012	Power	Luc Delahaye, various works, 2008–2011	Robert Adams, Turning back; Daniel Beltrá, Spill; Mohamed Bourouissa, Périphérique; Philippe Chancel, Fukushima: The irresistible power of nature; Edmund Clark, Guantanamo: If the light goes out; Carl De Keyzer, Moments before the flood; Rena Effendi, Still life in the zone; Jacqueline Hassink, Arab domains; An-My Lê, 29 palms; Joel Sternfeld, When it changed; Guy Tillim, Congo Democratic	Simon Norfolk, Afghanistan
2014	Consumption	Michael Schmidt, Lebensmittel	Adam Bartos, Yard sale; Motoyuki Daifu, Project family; Rineke Dijkstra, Almerisa; Hong Hao, My things; Mishka Henner, Beef and oil; Juan Fernando Herrán, Escalas; Boris Mikhailov, Tea, Coffee and Cappuccino; Abraham Oghobase; Allan Sekula, Fish story; Laurie Simmons, The love doll	
2015	Disorder	Valérie Belin	Ilit Azoulay, Imaginary Order; Matthew Brandt, Honeybees; Maxim Dondyuk, Culture of the Confrontation; Alixandra Fazzina, A Million Shillings: Escape from Somalia; Ori Gersht, Blow Up; John Gossage, Should Nature Change; Pieter Hugo, Permanent Error; Gideon Mendel, Drowning World; Sophie Ristelhueber, Eleven Blowups; Brent Stirton, A Violation of Eden; Yang Yongliang, Artificial Wonderland	
2016	Space	Richard Mosse, Heat Maps	Mandy Barker, Beyond Drifting: Imperfectly Known Animals; Saskia Groneberg, Büropflanze; Beate Gütschow, S Series; Rinko Kawauchi, Ametsuchi; Benny Lam, Subdivided Flats; Sohei Nishino, Diorama Map; Sergey Ponomarev, Europe Migration Crisis; Thomas Ruff, ma.r.s; Munem Wasif, Land of Undefined Territory; Pavel Wolberg, Barricades; Michael Wolf, Tokyo Compression	
2019	Hope	Joana Choumali, Ça va aller (It will be OK)	Shahidul Alam, Still She Smiles; Margaret Courtney-Clarke, Cry Sadness into the Coming Rain; Rena Effendi, Transylvania: Built on Grass; Lucas Foglia, Human Nature; Janelle Lynch, Another Way of Looking at Love; Ross McDonnell, Limbs; Gideon Mendel, Damage: A Testament of Faded Memory; Ivor Prickett, End of the Caliphate; Robin Rhode, Principle of Hope,017; Awoiska van der Molen, Im schwarzen Himmelsrund; Alexia Webster, Street Studios - An Archive of the Heart.	
2021	Fire	Sally Mann, Blackwater		
2022	Human	Gauri Gill, Notes from the desert		

== Prix Pictet Japan Award ==
Inaugurated in 2015 the Prix Pictet Japan Award celebrates Japanese photographers aged 40 or under whose work carries strong messages on global sustainability. Supported by the Prunier Foundation, this prize was inaugurated in 2015 in recognition of Japan’s status as one of the great centres of world photography. Entry is by nomination and the winner receives a prize of ¥1,000,000.
