= Michael Wolf (photographer) =

German artist and photographer

- Born: 30 July 1954; Munich, West Germany
- Died: 24 April 2019 (aged 64); Cheung Chau, Hong Kong
- Citizenship: Hong Kong
- Occupation: Photographer

Michael Wolf (30 July 1954 – 24 April 2019) was a German born artist and photographer who captured daily life in big cities. His work takes place primarily in Hong Kong and Paris and focuses on architectural patterns and structures, as well as the documentation of human life and interaction in the city. Wolf has published multiple photo books, has had his work exhibited widely around the world, has permanent collections across Germany and the United States, and has won three World Press Photo Awards from 2005 to 2011.

== Early life ==
Wolf was born in 1954 in Munich, Germany, and was raised in the United States, Europe, and Canada. He grew up in a family of artists; his father was a calligraphist and his mother worked with pottery and paint. He attended the North Toronto Collegiate Institute and the University of California, Berkeley. In 1976, he obtained a degree in visual communication at the University of Essen, Germany, where he studied with Otto Steinert.

== Professional career ==
Wolf began his career in 1994 as a photojournalist, spending eight years working in Hong Kong for the German magazine Stern. As the magazine industry began to decline over the coming years, his photojournalism assignments became more dense, and he is quoted as saying that they were "stupid and boring." This led his career in a new direction as he strayed from photojournalism and instead began a career in fine-art photography in 2003, which is the work he is most credited for today.

== Notable works ==
=== Bastard Chairs / Sitting in China ===
Wolf began non-editorial photography with a series entitled Bastard Chairs, small chairs that Chinese people would repair repeatedly using whatever materials were available. Wolf reports that the police detained him twice during the photographing of the series for "doing something which was harmful to the Chinese state." Photographs from the series were published in a 2002 book entitled Sitting in China. Although Wolf called the bastard chairs a "great symbol of the Chinese people's thriftiness and resourcefulness," and the book received positive reviews in the West, some Chinese people felt that the photographs made China appear "backward."

=== The Real Toy Story ===
In follow-up to the China: Factory of the World series, Wolf created an installation entitled The Real Toy Story. It consisted of 20,000 toys made in China and purchased in California attached with magnets to the walls of the gallery, along with photographs of workers making the toys.

=== Architecture of Density ===
In this series, Wolf photographed Hong Kong's tall buildings in a way that depicted them as "abstractions, never-ending repetitions of architectural patterns." The photographs excluded the sky and the ground, thereby emphasizing the vertical lines of the buildings. The images have been compared with those of Andreas Gursky and Candida Höfer. Tugo Cheng, an architect and fine artist from Hong Kong, described these images saying "He took a building that is very three-dimensional and compressed it into a surface in a way that would make one feel breathless and lost in scale."

The first book containing images from the series, Hong Kong: Front Door/ Back Door, was published in 2005. One review noted the book's "representation of an overpopulated city emptied of its human presence" and praised "the visual intelligence of Wolf's photographs." The Outside volume of Wolf's two-volume 2009 book Hong Kong Inside Outside contained a more extensive selection of photographs from this series.

=== 100x100 ===
In 2006, Wolf took photographs of residents in their rooms in a building in Hong Kong's oldest public housing complex, the Shek Kip Mei Estate, which was going to be demolished. He used a wide-angle lens to show as much of the interiors of the rooms as possible. Each room was approximately 100 square feet (9.3 m^{2}) in size, and he displayed photographs of 100 rooms, leading to the name "100x100." In an interview, Wolf likened the series to a scientific project, "an investigation into the use of limited space." The Inside volume of Wolf's two-volume book Hong Kong Inside Outside of 2009 contained the complete photographs from this series.

=== Copy Art / Real Fake Art ===
Between 2005 and 2007, Wolf photographed painters in Shenzhen, China, who reproduced famous works of art such as Sunflowers by Vincent van Gogh. Each portrait consisted of a "copy artist" along with an example of a copied work. The settings were described as "dirty alleyways and street corners." One reviewer wrote that the pictures "document intimate cultural and economic facets of globalization even as they record and complicate critical dilemmas about authenticity and the non-economic values of art." The series was collected in his book Real Fake Art published in 2011.

=== Transparent City ===
A series shot in downtown Chicago beginning in 2006 that "combine[d] impersonal cityscapes shot primarily at dusk or at night with details of the buildings’ inhabitants" became the basis for the 2008 book Transparent City. The photographs were taken from rooftops at dusk with a long lens. As in the Architecture of Density series, the exterior photographs excluded the horizon and the sky, leaving the windows of the buildings as the main subjects. In one interview, Wolf said that he came upon the idea of showing close-ups of people in the windows after he noticed a man giving him the finger in a photograph. In another interview, Wolf cited the artistic work of Edward Hopper as an inspiration for the series because of its voyeuristic nature and its inclusion of architectural details.

In an interview, Wolf said that shooting in Chicago convinced him to switch from film to digital. "For most of my first major series Architecture of Density, I shot with a 4×5 film camera," he said. "But when it came to shooting Chicago—which is a very windy city—the slightest gust of wind would vibrate the tripod, and I suspected many of my photographs would be ruined." Shooting digital allowed him to review the days' images, and guaranteed the precision Wolf wanted. "There’s nothing accidental in my photos," he added in the same interview.

Articles about the book connected the photographs to the film Rear Window by Alfred Hitchcock. One reviewer described the book as "frightening," causing a feeling of "remoteness." The series was controversial because some people felt that the cropped and enlarged photographs of people in the buildings constituted an invasion of privacy.

=== Tokyo Compression ===
In the 2010 book Tokyo Compression, Wolf presented portraits of Japanese people inside crowded Tokyo subway trains who had been pressed against a window. The commuters' expressions were characterized in one review as "traumatised" and "woeful." Wolf stated that some people closed their eyes or hid their faces with their hands upon realizing that they were being photographed.

One reviewer concluded that Wolf's Architecture of Density, Transparent City, and Tokyo Compression series represented a progression from long shot to close-up. Wolf won a first prize in Daily Life in the 2009 World Press Photo competition for his Tokyo Compression work. Martin Parr selected the 2010 book as one of the 30 most influential photobooks published between 2001 and 2010.

Tokyo Compression was part of Metropolis, City Life in the Urban Age, the 2011 Noorderlicht Photofestival. One of Wolf's pictures was used for the poster, the cover of the catalogue and all media material of the exhibition.

=== Series using Google Street View ===
In several series, such as Paris Street View, Manhattan Street View, and A Series of Unfortunate Events, Wolf took photographs of Google Street View scenes on his computer screen. Wolf compared his method of finding interesting scenes online to those of a street photographer walking around in a city. He has called his Street View series "a statement about art."

The Street View photographs were characterized by pixelation and image noise which were compared with techniques used by Roy Lichtenstein and Andy Warhol in their art. The work led to discussion of how the automatically taken Google Street View images affected the "decisive moment" concept of Henri Cartier-Bresson; nevertheless, the photographs were said to contain "some mystery" in that they were "hard to interpret." Some of Wolf's photographs resemble recognized classics of photography such as Le baiser de l'hôtel de ville (The Kiss) by Robert Doisneau.

== Controversy ==
Wolf's work in some cases was subjected to criticism and controversy surrounding the methods in which he obtained his photographs. In his work A Series of Unfortunate Events, his use of Google Street View was criticized by other photojournalists after he won an honorable mention in the World Press Photo competition for this series. Critics claimed it was not real photojournalism because he himself was not out on the streets taking the photographs. Instead, he would sift through thousands of random imagery from Google Street View for photographs that matched his project. Wolf, however, viewed this method as an innovative and different way to acquire his media.

Again, in his work Transparent City, he photographed buildings in downtown Chicago at dusk so that the inside of the windows were visible and the building's inhabitants were shown. This work created a discussion about privacy concerns, as people were being photographed unknowingly from inside their homes, although it gave a unique look into urban living with an emphasis on loneliness.

== Exhibitions ==
- 2003: Portraits of Chinese People, John Batten Gallery, Hong Kong
- 2005: Architecture of Density, Robert Koch Gallery, San Francisco
- 2006: Made in China, Museum of Contemporary Photography, Chicago (group exhibit including The Real Toy Story)
- 2006: The Real Toy Story, Museum of Work, Hamburg
- 2006: 100 X 100, Goethe Institute, Hong Kong
- 2007: Chinese Copy Art, Goethe Institute, Hong Kong
- 2007: Copy Art and 100 x 100, Robert Koch Gallery, San Francisco
- 2008–2009: Transparent City, Museum of Contemporary Photography, Chicago
- 2008–2009: Transparent City, Robert Koch Gallery, San Francisco
- 2010: Paris Street View, Foam Fotografiemuseum Amsterdam
- 2010: iseeyou, Bruce Silverstein Gallery, New York
- 2010: Life in Cities, m97 Gallery, Shanghai
- 2011: Tokyo Compression, Forum für Fotografie Köln
- 2012: Michael Wolf, Flowers Galleries, London, 25 November 2011 - 7 January 2012.
- 2012: Life in Cities, Christophe Guye Galerie, Zurich, Switzerland.
- 2016: BredaPhoto International Photofestival
- 2017: Life in Cities – continued, Christophe Guye Galerie, Zurich, Switzerland
- 2017: Life in Cities, Rencontres d'Arles festival, Arles, France (organized by The Hague Museum of Photography)
- 2018: Life in Cities, The Hague Museum of Photography
- 2018: Life in Cities, Deichtorhallen Hamburg

== Collections ==
Wolf's work is held in the following permanent collections:

- Brooklyn Museum, New York
- Milwaukee Art Museum, Wisconsin
- Museum Folkwang, Essen, Germany
- Museum of Contemporary Photography, Chicago

== Publications ==
- Sitting in China. Göttingen: Steidl, 2002. ISBN 3-88243-670-0
- Hong Kong Front Door Back Door. London: Thames & Hudson, 2005. ISBN 0-500-54304-6
- Min, Anchee, Duo Duo, and Stefan Landsberger. Chinese Propaganda Posters: From the Collection of Michael Wolf. Taschen's 25th anniversary special edition. Köln: Taschen, 2008. ISBN 978-3-8365-0316-7
- The Transparent City. New York: Aperture/ MoCP, 2008. ISBN 978-1-59711-076-1
- Hong Kong Inside Outside. Berlin: Asia One/Peperoni, 2009. ISBN 978-3-941825-04-8
- FY. Berlin: Wanderer Books/Peperoni, 2010. ISBN 978-3-941825-19-2
- Tokyo Compression. Berlin: Asia One/Peperoni, 2010. ISBN 978-3-941825-08-6
- Hong Kong corner houses. Hong Kong: Hong Kong University Press. ISBN 978-988-8028-72-6
- asoue (A Series of Unfortunate Events), 2nd edition. Berlin: Wanderer Books/Peperoni, 2011. ISBN 978-3-941825-10-9
- Tokyo Compression Revisited. Berlin: Asia One/Peperoni, 2011. ISBN 978-3-941825-25-3
- Real Fake Art. Berlin: Peperoni, 2011. ISBN 978-3-941825-20-8.
- Tokyo Compression Three. Berlin: Peperoni, 2011. ISBN 978-3941825413.
- Bottrop-Ebel 76. Peperoni, 2012.
- Hong Kong Trilogy. Berlin: Peperoni, 2013. ISBN 978-3-941825-59-8.
- Hong Kong Flora. Berlin: Peperoni, 2014. ISBN 978-3-941825-62-8. Edition of 400 copies.
- Informal Solution - Observations in Hong Kong Back Alley. Hong Kong: WE Press, 2016. ISBN 978-988-14230-3-0.
- Tokyo Compression Final Cut. Berlin: Peperoni, 2017. ISBN 978-3941249097.
- Cheung Chau Sunrises. Berlin: Buchkunst Berlin, 2019. ISBN 978-3981980554.
- Hong Kong Lost Laundry. Berlin: Buchkunst Berlin, 2019. ISBN 978-3981980530.

== Awards ==
- 2005: First prize, Contemporary Issues category, World Press Photo competition for his photographs of workers in several types of factories for an article in Stern.
- 2010: World Press Photo competition, Daily life category, first prize.
- 2010: Transparent City was shortlisted for the Prix Pictet.
- 2011: World Press Photo competition, Contemporary Issues, honorable mention.
