= Valérie Belin =

French photographer

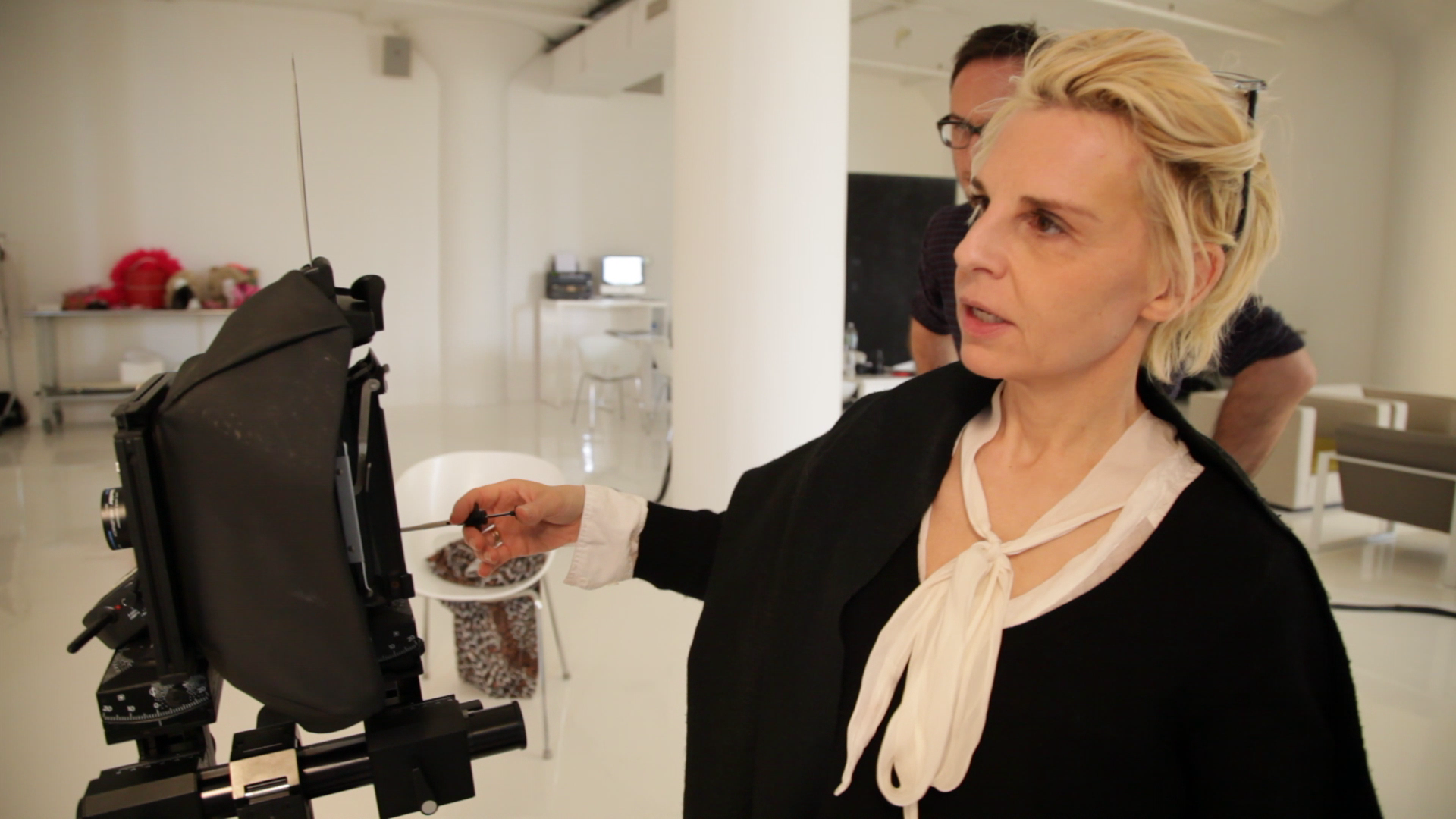
- Belin at work
- Born: 1964 (age 61–62); Boulogne-Billancourt
- Known for: Photography
- Website: https://valeriebelin.com

Valérie Belin (born 1964) is a French art photographer. She lives and works in Paris.

== Biography ==
Valérie Belin was born in Boulogne-Billancourt. She trained at the École Beaux-arts de Versailles from 1983 to 1985 and at the École Nationale Supérieure d’Art de Bourges from 1985 to 1988, and then obtained a diploma in advanced studies in the philosophy of art from the University of Paris 1 Pantheon-Sorbonne in 1989.

In 2015 she won the sixth Prix Pictet, the theme of which was "Disorder." That year she also had an exhibition at the Centre Pompidou in Paris, entitled Unquiet Images and comprising around 30 works depicting mannequins.

Her work is held in the collections of the Museum of Modern Art in New York, the San Francisco Museum of Modern Art, the Musée National d'Art Moderne in Paris and the Musée d'Art Moderne de Paris.

In 2024, a retrospective of Belin's work was featured in the annual Photo London event.

== Works ==
Her work takes the form of photographic series. In the 2000s she started using digital post-production tools which gave her greater freedom to change and control the chromatic values of the prints. She now produced her first series in colour. In 2009 Belin began to use other kinds of digital manipulation, heightening the hybrid, graphic and artificial dimension of her work. These include solarisation and overprinting. Since then, she has also worked with other abstract vectorial forms, like digital "readymades" found on the internet, which she reworks on the computer, melding them with her images.

=== Film and performance ===
At the same time, Belin has explored other forms of expression. Black-Eyed Susan (2011) is a video based on the photographic series of the same name from 2010. MJ6 was a live event in 2013, a choreographed performance based on her 2004 series on Michael Jackson lookalikes, presented at Centre Georges Pompidou.

== Awards ==
- 2000 :Prix HSBC pour la photographie
- 2001: Prix Altadis
- 2015: Prix Pictet
