= Michael Schmidt (photographer) =

German photographer (1945–2014)

- Born: October 6, 1945; East Berlin
- Died: May 24, 2014 (aged 68)
- Occupation: Photographer
- Years active: 1965–2014
- Awards: Prix Pictet (2014)

Michael Schmidt (6 October 1945 – 24 May 2014) was a German photographer. Schmidt focused on Berlin and explored the burden of German identity within modern history.

Schmidt started photographing West Berlin's streets, buildings, and people in 1965, using a semi-documentary style. He continued creating "ambitious projects" in the city, almost entirely in black and white, with an increasingly impressionistic approach, up until his death in 2014. Each project was first exhibited, then published as a book.

Schmidt founded the Werkstatt für Photographie (Workshop for Photography) in Berlin in 1976.

The Museum of Modern Art in New York City exhibited U-nit-y in 1996; Frauen was exhibited at the Berlin Biennale in 2010; and Lebensmittel, his series on the global food industry, was shown at the Venice Biennale in 2013. Haus der Kunst in Munich held a retrospective exhibition of his work in 2010. Parr and Badger included his book Waffenruhe (1987) in The Photobook: A History, Volume II. He died in 2014, just days after receiving the Prix Pictet for Lebensmittel.

== Life and work ==
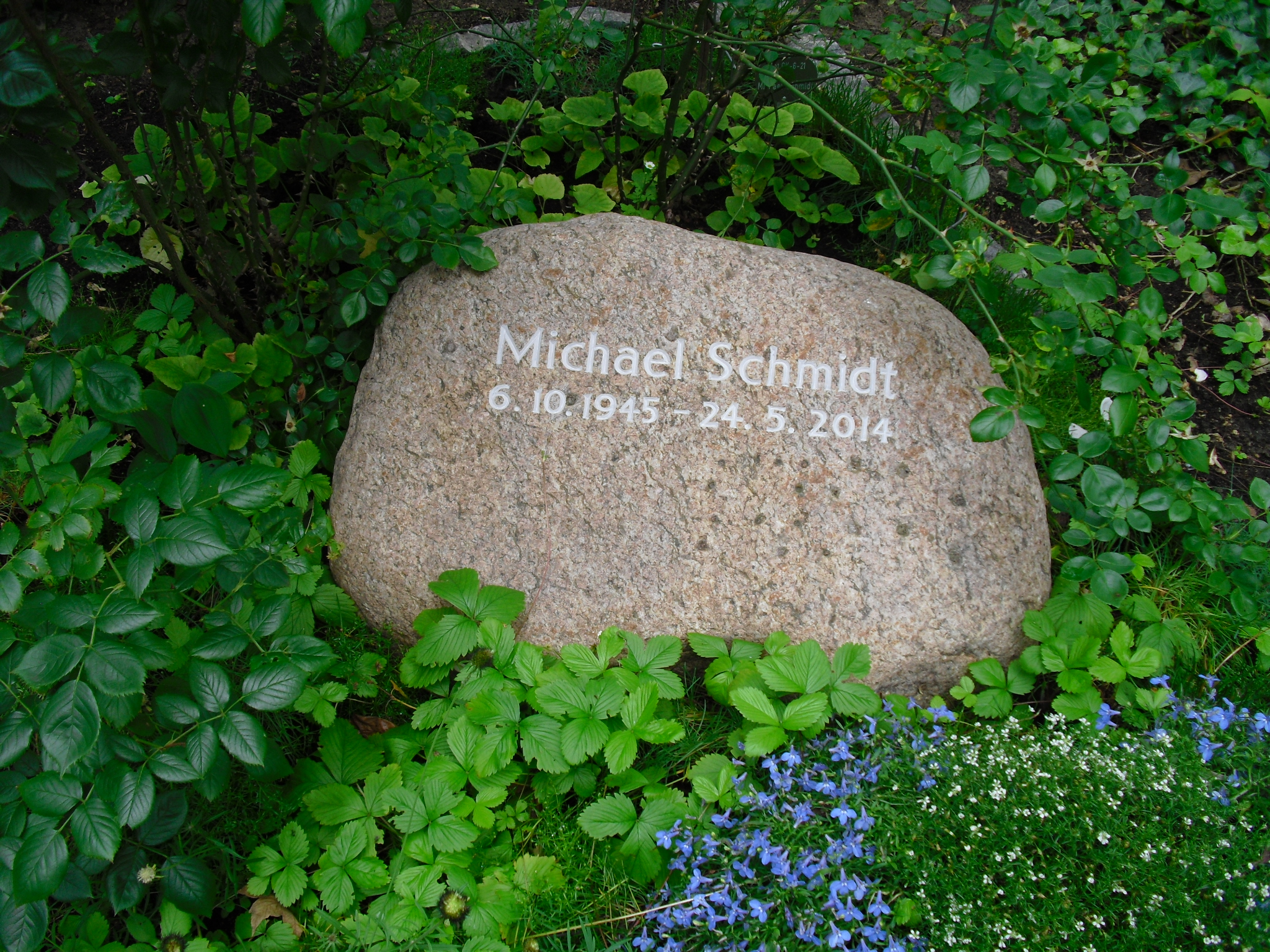
Michael Schmidt's gravestone in Dorotheenstadt cemetery, Berlin

Schmidt was born on 6 October 1945 in East Berlin, five months after the German surrender ended World War II in Europe. His family crossed to West Berlin before the construction of the Berlin Wall in 1961. He began photographing in 1965 when he was 20 years old.

In 1976, Schmidt founded the Werkstatt für Photographie (Workshop for Photography) at the Volkhoschschule (Adult Education Center) in Berlin. The school "played a critical role in Berlin becoming a transatlantic forum of exchange between European and American photographers."

His early series about Berlin, Stadtlandschaft (Urban Landscapes) (1974–1975) and Berlin, Stadtbilder (Berlin, Urban Images) (1976–1980), "mapped out the city in which he lived in a semi-documentary way". Other series about Berlin include Berlin-Wedding (1976–1978); Berlin nach 45 (Berlin after 45) (1980); Waffenruhe (Ceasefire) (1985–1987), about the Berlin Wall and those affected by it; and Ein-heit (U-ni-ty) (1991–1994), contemporary urban landscapes and portraits from Germany alongside historical photographs from the National Socialist era, his reaction to the 1989 fall of the Wall and the reunification of East and West Germany that followed.

Natur (Nature) (1987–1997) contains black and white images of the German landscape. Lebensmittel (foodstuff) took seven years to make, with Schmidt travelling worldwide. He photographed "across the spectrum of mass food production, from factory farms" (including salmon farms and dairy farms), and bread factories, "to industrial slaughterhouses and on to plastic-wrapped, sanitised portions of food in supermarkets."

He died on 24 May 2014.

== Publications ==
- Berlin Kreuzberg. Berlin: Bezirksamt Kreuzberg, 1973.
- Berlin, Stadtlandschaft und Menschen. Berlin: Stapp, 1978. ISBN 978-3-87776-208-0.
- Berlin-Wedding: Stadtlandschaft und Menschen. Berlin: Galerie u. Verl. A. Nagel, 1978. ISBN 978-3-9800057-1-5.
  - Second edition. Koenig, 2019. With texts by Heinz Ohff and Thomas Weski in English and German.
- Berlin-Kreuzberg. Stadtbilder = Berlin-Kreuzberg, Urban Images. Berlin: Public Verlagsgesellschaft, 1984. ISBN 978-3-89087-001-4.
- Stadtlandschaften 1981 = Urban Landscapes 1981. Essen: Museum Folkwang, 1981.
- Benachteiligt. Berlin: Senator für Gesundheit, Soziales und Familie, 1982.
- Bilder 1979–1986. = Images 1979–1986. Hannover: Sprengel Museum, 1987.
- Waffenruhe = Ceasefire. Berlin: Dirk Nishen, 1987. With a story by Einar Schleef.
  - Second edition. Foundation for Photography and Media Art with the Michael Schmidt Archive; London: Koenig Books, 2018. ISBN 978-3-96098-302-6. With a new afterword by Thomas Weski.
- Ein-Heit. Zürich/Berlin/New York City: Scalo, 1996. ISBN 978-3-931141-17-2. Edited by Thomas Weski.
  - U-nit-y. Zürich/Berlin/New York City: Scalo, 1996. ISBN 978-1-881616-64-1.
- Landschaft – Selbst – Waffenruhe – Menschenbilder (Ausschnitte). Münster: Westfälischer Kunstverein; Munich: Kunstbunker Tumulka, 1998. ISBN 978-3-925047-42-8. "Published in conjunction with an exhibition held at the Westfälischer Kunstverein, Oct. 24, 1998-Jan. 3, 1999, and the Kunstbunker Tumulka, Feb. 2-Mar. 7, 1999."
- Frauen = Women. Cologne: Walther König, 2000. ISBN 978-3-88375-423-9.
- Irgendwo. Cologne: Snoeck, 2005. ISBN 978-3-936859-18-8.
- Berlin nach 45 = Berlin after 45. Göttingen: Steidl, 2005. ISBN 978-3-86521-090-6. Edited by Ute Eskildsen. With contributions by Janos Frecot.
- 89/90. Cologne: Snoeck, 2010. ISBN 978-3-940953-43-8.
- Lebensmittel = foodstuff. Cologne: Snoeck, 2012. ISBN 978-3-940953-93-3.
- Natur = Nature. London: Mack, 2014. ISBN 978-1-907946-58-5.

== Award ==
- 2014: Prix Pictet for Lebensmittel

== Exhibitions ==
=== Solo exhibitions ===
- Michael Schmidt: U-ni-ty, Museum of Modern Art, New York City, January–March 1996.
- Grey As Colour: Photographs Until 2009, Haus der Kunst, Munich, 2010. A retrospective of his work.
- Une autre photographie allemande, Jeu de Paume, Paris, 8 June – 29 August 2021. A retrospective of his work.

=== Group exhibitions and during festivals ===
- Frauen (Women, 1997-99), Berlin Biennale, Berlin, 2010.
- Lebensmittel, Venice Biennale, Venice, 2013.
- Work shortlisted for the Prix Pictet, Victoria and Albert Museum, London, 2014.
- Conflict, Time, Photography, Tate Modern, London, November 2014 – March 2015.

== Collection ==
Schmidt's work is held in the following public collection:

- Museum of Modern Art, New York City
