= Alison Rossiter =

American artist

Alison Rossiter (born 1953) is an American photographer. She attended the Rochester Institute of Technology and the Banff Centre School. In 2007 Rossiter moved from traditional photography to creating photograms from vintage photographic papers. Her work is included in the collections of the Whitney Museum of American Art, the National Gallery of Canada and the Getty Museum.

== Expired Paper ==
Rossiter has an extensive collection of expired photographic papers from the early 20th century through the 1980s. Using limited darkroom techniques, Rossiter creates minimalist photograms referencing landscape and geometry while revealing the subtle chemical and environmental traces the paper has accumulated during its decades in storage. Her work increasingly employs multiple sheets of paper assembled into grids.

== Publications ==
=== Monographs ===
- Compendium, ISBN 9781942185703
- Expired Paper, ISBN 978-1-942-18533-8

=== Publications Including Rossiter ===
- Light, Paper, Process
  - Los Angeles, CA: J. Paul Getty Museum, 2014. Author: Virginia Heckert. ISBN 9781606064375 Light, Paper, Process features the work of seven artists—Alison Rossiter, Marco Breuer, James Welling, Lisa Oppenheim, Chris McCaw, John Chiara, and Matthew Brandt—who investigate the possibilities of analog photography by finding innovative, surprising, and sometimes controversial ways to push light-sensitive photographic papers and chemical processing beyond their limits.
