= Pier 24 Photography =

Nonprofit art museum in San Francisco, US

- Established: 2010; 16 years ago
- Location: Pier 24, The Embarcadero, San Francisco, California
- Coordinates: 37.7891323°N 122.3877268°W
- Type: Photography, Art, Nonprofit organization
- Visitors: Free by Appointment
- Founders: Andrew Pilara and Mary Pilara
- Directors: Christopher McCall and Allie Haeusslein
- Public transit access: Muni: Folson & Embarcadero Station; Lines N Judah; S Castro Shuttle; T Third Street; E Embarcadero B.A.R.T.: Embarcadero Station
- Parking: Pier 30 Parking Lot; Harrison & Embarcadero
- Website: www.pier24.org

Pier 24 Photography is a non-profit art museum located on the Port of San Francisco directly under the San Francisco–Oakland Bay Bridge. The organization houses the permanent collection of the Pilara Foundation, which collects, preserves and exhibits photography. It produces exhibitions, publications, and public programs. Pier 24 Photography is the largest exhibition space in the world dedicated solely to photography.

Pier 24 photography museum closed in July 2025 with the expiration of their lease with the San Francisco Port. The Pilara Foundation struggled for five years to secure a new lease with the San Francisco Port and failed to do so when the Port wanted to triple the rent. They decided to close, as the money would be of better use to the community and their philanthropic focus would go towards arts, education, and health care research.

== Collection ==
Revelations—the Diane Arbus retrospective organized by San Francisco Museum of Modern Art in 2003—inspired the purchase of the Pilara Foundation’s first photograph, a portrait from her "Untitled" series. The collection has grown to over 4,000 works spanning the history of the medium and its international breadth. At the collection’s core are those photographers first exhibited in two seminal twentieth-century exhibitions: New Documents (1967) at the Museum of Modern Art and New Topographics (1975) at George Eastman Museum. In recent years, the Foundation has collected more emerging photographers in depth, developing holdings that reflect evolving practices within the medium.

== Auction ==
In May 2023 Sotheby's New York held an auction entitled "Pier 24 Photography from the Pilara Family Foundation Sold to Benefit Charitable Organizations". As Sotheby's stated:

In July 2025, the Pilara Foundation will pivot its philanthropic focus by transitioning to a granting foundation focused on supporting organizations devoted to healthcare research, education, and the arts. 100% of the proceeds from the auctions of Pier 24 Photography from the Pilara Family Foundation Sold to Benefit Charitable Organizations will provide direct benefit to critical programs and research that will impact communities in need.

- Dorothea Lange oversized 1940s-era print of Migrant Mother for double estimate $609,000.
- Lee Friedlander's The Little Screens in 52 signed-pieces for $609,600
- Hiroshi Sugimoto's 1999 The Music Lesson for $508,000
- Robert Frank's 1955 Charleston S. C. for almost triple estimate $952,500
- Richard Avedon's Juan Patricio Lobato, Carney, Rocky Ford, Colorado, August 23, 1980 for $444,500

== Exhibitions ==
- Pier 24: The Inaugural Exhibition, March 16, 2010 – June 16, 2010
- From the Collection of Randi and Bob Fisher, September 16, 2010 – February 28, 2011
- Here., May 23, 2011 – January 31, 2012
- About Face, May 15, 2012 – April 30, 2013
- A Sense of Place, July 1, 2013 – May 30, 2014
- Secondhand, August 1, 2014 – May 31, 2015
- The Whiteness of the Whale, August 3, 2015 – February 29, 2016
- Collected, May 2, 2016 – January 31, 2017
- The Grain of the Present, April 1, 2017 – March 31, 2018
- This Land, June 1, 2018 - March 31, 2019
- Looking Back: Ten Years of Pier 24 Photography, July 1, 2019 - April 30, 2020

== Larry Sultan Visiting Artist Program ==
The Larry Sultan Visiting Artist Program is a collaboration between Pier 24 Photography, California College of the Arts and the San Francisco Museum of Modern Art created in honor of the influential Bay Area photographer and educator, Larry Sultan. Each year, the program brings six international artists to San Francisco. During their visits, artists provide a free lecture open to the public. They also work with graduate students at California College of the Arts, mentoring them in the studio and taking them on citywide fieldtrips.

=== Visiting artists ===
2010
- Thomas Demand (German)
- Naoya Hatakeyama (Japanese)

2011

- Paul Graham (British)
- Erik Kessels (Dutch)
- Sophie Calle (French)
- Walid Raad (Lebanese)
- Cuny Janssen (Dutch)
- Alec Soth (American)

2012

- Stephen Shore (American)
- Jason Fulford (American)
- LaToya Ruby Frazier (American)
- Charlotte Cotton (British)
- Zoe Strauss (American)
- David Goldblatt (South African)

2013

- Tod Papageorge (American)
- Martin Parr (British)
- Mark Steinmetz (American)
- Rinko Kawauchi (Japanese)
- Collier Schorr (American)
- Kalup Linzy (American)

2014

- Anouk Kruithof (Dutch)
- Philip Gefter and Mike Mandel (American)
- Michael Wolf (German)
- Charlotte Cotton (British)
- Joel Sternfeld (American)
- Simon Baker (British)
- David Levi Strauss (American)

2015

- Laura Wexler (American)
- Daniel Gordon (American)
- Paul Graham (British)
- Alison Rossiter (American)
- Owen Kydd (Canadian)

2016

- John Divola (American)
- An-My Lê (American)
- Marco Breuer (German)
- John Houck (American)
- Sharon Lockhart (American)
- Viviane Sassen (Dutch)

2017

- Lieko Shiga (Japanese)
- Mickalene Thomas (American)
- Hank Willis Thomas (American)
- Awoiska van der Molen (Dutch)
- Shannon Ebner (American)
- Kerry Tribe (American)

2018

- Lyle Ashton Harris (American)
- Trevor Paglen (American)

== Larry Sultan Photography Award ==
In 2016, Pier 24 Photography in partnership with California College of the Arts, Headlands Center for the Arts, and San Francisco Museum of Modern Art launched the Larry Sultan Photography Award. The award includes a six- to ten-week residency at the Headlands Center for the Arts in Sausalito, California, and a $10,000 cash award.

=== Recipients ===
- 2016: Marco Breuer
- 2017: Awoiska van der Molen
- 2018: Bieke Depoorter
- 2019: Jonathan Calm

== Publications ==
- Here., San Francisco: Pier 24 Photography, 2011. ISBN 978-0-9839917-0-0. Exhibition guide.
- About Face, San Francisco: Pier 24 Photography, 2012. ISBN 978-0-9839917-1-7. Exhibition guide.
- A Sense of Place, San Francisco: Pier 24 Photography, 2013. ISBN 978-0-9839917-3-1. Exhibition guide.
- About Face. San Francisco: Pier 24 Photography, 2014. ISBN 978-0-9839917-2-4. Exhibition catalog. Edition of 1000 copies. With forewords by Christopher McCall, and Richard Avedon (from In The American West), an introduction by Philip Gefter, and texts by Sandra S. Phillips, and Ulrike Schneider.
- Secondhand, San Francisco: Pier 24 Photography, 2014. ISBN 978-0-9839917-5-5. Exhibition guide.
- A Sense of Place, San Francisco: Pier 24 Photography, 2015. ISBN 978-0-9839917-4-8. Exhibition catalog. Edition of 1000 copies.
- Conversations: Secondhand, San Francisco: Pier 24 Photography, 2015. ISBN 978-0-9839917-7-9.
- Paul Graham: The Whiteness of the Whale, London: Mack; San Francisco, Pier 24 Photography, 2015. ISBN 978-1-91016-432-7.
- Day for Night Photographs by Richard Learoyd, New York: Aperture; San Francisco, Pier 24 Photography, 2015. ISBN 978-1-59711-329-8.
- Rochester 585/716: A Postcard from America Project, New York: Aperture; San Francisco, Pier 24 Photography, 2015. ISBN 978-1-59711-340-3. Edition of 1000 copies.
- Collected, San Francisco: Pier 24 Photography, 2016. ISBN 978-0-9839917-8-6. Exhibition guide.
- Secondhand, San Francisco: Pier 24 Photography, 2016. ISBN 978-0-9839917-6-2. Exhibition catalog. Edition of 1000 copies.
- Collected, San Francisco, Pier 24 Photography, 2016. ISBN 978-0-9972432-0-8 Exhibition Catalog. Edition of 1000 copies.
- The Grain of the Present, San Francisco: Pier 24 Photography, 2017. ISBN 978-0-9972432-1-5. Exhibition guide.
- John Chiara: California, New York: Aperture; San Francisco, Pier 24 Photography, 2017. ISBN 978-1597114233
- The Grain of the Present, San Francisco: Pier 24 Photography, 2017. ISBN 978-1-59711-000-6. Exhibition Catalog. Edition of 1000 copies.
- This Land, San Francisco: Pier 24 Photography, 2018. ISBN Exhibition Catalog. ISBN 978-1597110037. Edition of 750 copies.

== The building ==
Located just south of the Ferry Building on the Port of San Francisco, Pier 24 Photography is housed in the Pier 24 annex. Originally designed to connect Piers 24 and Pier 26, the Pier 24 annex was originally built to be a 28,000 square foot cargo shed for truck side loading. Pier 24 was constructed between 1912 and 1916, and the annex followed in 1935-36. Several businesses were housed in Pier 24 annex over the twentieth century, including Nelson Steamship Company, American-Hawaiian Steamship Company and Williams, Diamond & Company. The principal cargo stored by these companies included sugar, copra, vanilla, whale oil, and hides. Pier 24 was demolished after its transit shed and bulkhead caught fire in 1997. While the last remnants of Pier 24’s substructure were fully demolished in 2004, the Pier 24 annex remained intact.

The building is rented from the Port of San Francisco, which until 2017 granted the museum rent credits in exchange for repairs and improvements; these expired with the end of the lease term in 2017, and since the museum refused to pay the increased rent, in December 2019 the port served the foundation with notice that it must vacate the building and may be sued for underpayment of rent during the two years since the lease expired.
