= Mandy Barker =

British photographer

Mandy Barker FRPS
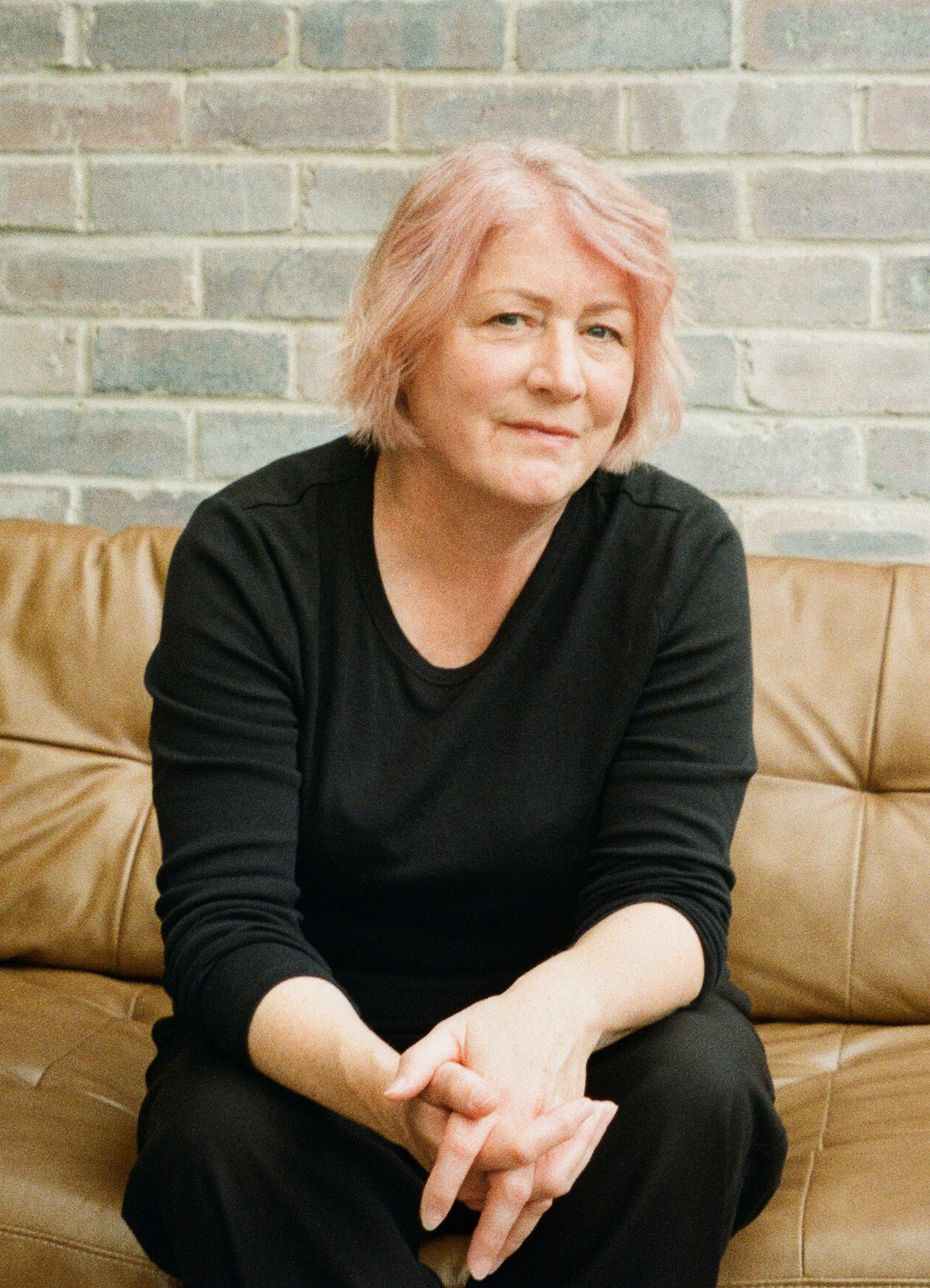
- Barker in 2025
- Born: 1964 (age 61–62)
- Known for: Photographic artist of plastic pollution
- Movement: Environmentalism, Photography, Contemporary art
- Awards: Fellowship of the Royal Photographic Society in 2019
- Website: www.mandy-barker.com

Mandy Barker is an international award-winning photographer and multidisciplinary artist whose work addressing marine plastic debris has received global recognition. Working alongside scientists and researchers, Barker aims to bring awareness to plastic pollution in the world's oceans and highlight its harmful effects on marine ecosystems and human health.

Barker has been published in over 50 countries and publications including National Geographic, Time, The Guardian, Smithsonian, The Explorer’s Journal, and New Scientist. She is frequently invited to contribute expert commentary in interviews with the BBC, ITV, Greenpeace, CNN, and the British Embassy. Her work has been exhibited worldwide from MoMA Museum of Modern Art, the United Nations headquarters in New York, the Victoria & Albert Museum in London, and the Science and Technology Park in Hong Kong.

== Life and Work ==
Born in Hull, East Yorkshire, Barker studied an Art Foundation Course at Hull College before completing a BA Graphic Design at Newcastle Polytechnic. Later in life she studied HNC Photography at Harrogate and an MA in Photography at De Montfort University.

After graduation she began investigating marine plastic debris, collaborating with scientists to raise public awareness of plastic pollution in the oceans, examine and record the scale of the problem, and encourage viewers to take action.

Barker received the Royal Photographic Society Environmental Bursary in 2012, enabling her to take part in the Tsunami Debris Field Expedition across the North Pacific Ocean alongside scientists and researchers. She went on to receive a National Geographic Society Grant for Research and Exploration in 2018, to be shortlisted for the Prix Pictet Award in 2017, and to be nominated for Deutsche Börse Photography Foundation Prize in 2018.

In 2019 she was awarded Fellowship of the Royal Photographic Society.

Mandy Barker lives in Leeds.

== Exhibitions ==
Barker has exhibited in more than 30 countries since 2011. To reach and engage a wide audience she has presented work in diverse spaces including galleries, marine debris conferences, site-specific installations, harbours, beaches and marine environments.

In 2019 Barker displayed work in over 25 different exhibitions globally, including three major solo shows at The Royal Photographic Society in Bristol, Impressions Gallery in Bradford, and Fotografiska in Stockholm.

During COP26 in 2021, Barker presented her work across 17 countries, with a major solo show at the Auckland Memorial Museum in New Zealand supported by the British Council New Zealand and the British High Commission.

=== Solo ===
- 2017 'Imperfectly Known Animals', Sirius Arts Centre, Cobh, Cork, Ireland
- 2017 “SOUP”, Fine Foundation Gallery, Durlston Castle, Swanage, UK
- 2018 "Mandy Barker: Hong Kong Soup", Centre for Chinese Contemporary Art, Manchester
- 2018 “Mar De Mares” Festival, A Celebration Dos Oceanos A Coruna, Spain
- 2019 "Sea of Artifacts" Fotografiska, Stockholm
- 2019 "Mandy Barker: Altered Ocean Exhibition", Royal Photographic Society House, Bristol
- 2019 “Our Plastic Ocean’ Impressions Gallery of Photography, Bradford, UK
- 2019 Complesso monumentale Santa Maria della Vita, Bologna, Italy
- 2019 ‘Ocean Obscura’, Kadmos Gallery, Stockholm, Sweden
- 2019 ‘Planet or Plastic’, Camera dei Deputati (Italian Parliament) & Complesso di Vicolo Valdina, Rome, Italy
- 2019 ‘Sea of Artifacts’ Fotografiska, Tallinn, Estonia
- 2019 "Not in my planet", Science Museum, Trento
- 2020 ‘Contaminazioni’, Regione Lombardia, Milan, Italy
- 2020 ‘Planet or Plastic’ Telli Gallery, Almaty, Kazakhstan
- 2020 'Ending Ocean Plastic through the Lens of Change', Miami Super Bowl, Miami, United States
- 2021 ‘Our Plastic Ocean’, Street Level Photoworks, Glasgow
- 2021 ‘Planet or Plastic’ National Geographic, ArtScience Museum, Singapore
- 2022 ‘PENALTY’, Municipal Heritage Museum, Malaga, Spain
- 2022 ‘Our Plastic Ocean’, The Scottish Seabird Centre, North Berwick, Scotland
- 2022 ‘Ocean Galaxy’ PENALTY series, guest room in East Street Arts, Art Hostel, Leeds, England
- 2022 ‘SHELF-LIFE’, Auckland War Memorial Museum, Auckland, New Zealand
- 2022 ‘Invasion of the Seas’, Sunaparanta Goa Centre for the Arts, India
- 2023 ‘Plastic SOUP’, Centre for British Photography, London
- 2023 ‘Plastic SOUP’ , National Trust, The Fox Talbot Museum, Lacock, UK
- 2024 “Oceans. From Renoir to Microplastics”, Museu Diocesà de Barcelona, Spain
- 2026 “SOUP” Gracefield Art Gallery, Dumfries, Scotland

=== Group ===
- 2001 "Snapshot of Britain", The Photographers' Gallery, London
- 2011 "SOUP” Blurb Photobook PBN 2011 Awards, Aperture FoundationNew York
- 2012 Worldwide Photography Biennial International Exhibition. The Borges Cultural Centre, Buenos Aires, Argentina
- 2013 EU International Marine Debris Conference – Abion Spreebogen Hotel, Berlin
- 2013 “An Eye for an Ear”, POS South-East Asia, Georgetown, Penang, Malaysia
- 2013 “SOUP”, The Charles K Kao Auditorium, Science & Technology Park, Hong Kong
- 2014 “GYRE”, The Anchorage Museum, Alaska
- 2015 “Scarcity/Waste” Syngenta Photography Award Exhibition, Somerset House, London, and Centro Cultural de Sao Paulo, Brazil
- 2016 Singapore International Photo Festival SIPF
- 2016 'Seen on Earth', LensCulture Earth Awards, Kunst Haus Wein, Vienna
- 2016 “GYRE” San Jose State University Thompson Gallery, San Jose, California
- 2017 Prix Pictet “SPACE”, touring 12 international venues including; The Victoria & Albert Museum, Zurich, Tokyo, Stuttgart, Moscow, Dublin, San Diego, Houston, Rome & Athens
- 2017 “SOUP”, Gextophoto, Ereaga Beach and Algorta Metro, Getxo, Bilbao, Spain
- 2018 “Beyond Drifting”, International Science Film Festival, Nijmegen, The Netherlands
- 2018 Hamburg Triennial of Photography, Deichtorhallen Square, Hamburg, Germany
- 2019 "Civilisation: The Way We Live Now", UCCA Center for Contemporary Art, Beijing
- 2019 "A History of Photography: Daguerreotype to Digital" Victoria and Albert Museum, London
- 2019 Guernsey Photographic Festival, and a performance with the Guernsey Symphony Orchestra, Guernsey, UK
- 2019 Shanghai Centre of Photography, Peer to Peer, China
- 2019 ‘Planet or Plastic’ United Nations Visitor’s Centre, New York, United States
- 2019 'Football is Art', National Football Museum, Manchester, England
- 2019 'CIVILISATION: The Way We Live Now' , UCCA Ullens Center for Contemporary Art, Beijing, China
- 2020 ‘Anthropocene - Save Our Planet’, Busan International Photo Festival, Gecheong Shipyard, Busan, Korea
- 2021 “Broken Nature” MoMA (Museum of Modern Art) New York City, United States
- 2021 ‘Planet or Plastic’ National Geographic Texas State Aquarium, United States
- 2022 ‘Follow the Water’ ‘DIP Sea KISS’ Mebuyan’s Vessel, San Juan, La Union, Philippines
- 2023 ‘The Stuff of Life/The Life of Stuff’, Sainsbury Centre for Visual Arts, Norwich, UK
- 2023 ‘Throwaway - the History of a Modern Crisis’, The House of European History, Bruxelles, Belgium
- 2023 ‘Future is Now’ SHELF-LIFE Copernicus Science Centre, Warsaw, Poland
- 2024 ‘Confession to the Earth’, Chungmu Arts Center Gallery, Seoul, South Korea
- 2024 ‘Birds: Brilliant and Bizarre’, Natural History Museum, London
- 2025 “Photographs of British Algae” Royal Academy of Arts Summer Exhibition, London
- 2025 “Flowers - Flora in Contemporary Culture”, Saatchi Gallery, London
- 2025 International Photography Festival of Castilla y León 2025, Palencia, Spain
- 2026 “STILL(FFS) Landskrona Foto Festival, Sweden

== Education & Impact ==
Barker’s work is rooted in public and community engagement, with a focus on raising awareness of plastic pollution among younger generations.

She has spoken internationally, leading talks, workshops and residencies, including in remote and environmentally vulnerable regions such as the Philippines and the Solomon Islands, to highlight the harmful affects of plastic pollution and climate change on ecosystems, and to encourage participants to reduce plastic use and consumption.

In 2019, she collaborated with Stanford University’s Communications Program to launch a multi-platform 360° virtual reality experience highlighting the global prevalence of plastic use.

In September 2024, Barker discussed her work in the context of Pope Francis’ reflections, speaking with Mons. Vincenzo Paglia, president of the Pontificia Accademia per la Vita, and reflecting on her exhibition Oceans: From Renoir to Microplastics, which included seven series of her work and was visited by over 100,000 people.

=== Talks and Seminars ===
- 2017 - Steppes Beyond, The Royal Geographical Society, London, guest speaker. 30 September - 1 October
- 2018 - National Geographic Photography Seminar - speaker, Washington DC, United States, 11 January
- 2018 - Almedalen - seminar on behalf of the British Embassy & British Council - Visby, island of Gotland, Sweden
- 2018 - Stanford University, Graduate Program in Journalism, California, United States
- 2024 - “Oceans: Beauty and destruction” - Reflections on the work of Mandy Barker and the thoughts of Pope Francis’ Talk with Mons. Vincenzo Paglia, president of the Pontificia Academia per la Vita.

== Publications ==
=== Monographs ===
- 2017 Beyond Drifting: Imperfectly Known Animals Published 1 May 2017. ISBN 978-0-9947919-1-7 by Overlapse (Out of Print)
- 2018 Beyond Drifting: Digest Edition Published September 2018. ISBN 978-0-9947919-9-3 by Overlapse (Out of print)
- 2019 Altered Ocean Publication May 2019. ISBN 978-1-9994468-0-2 by Overlapse (Out of print)
- 2025 Photographs of British Algae: Cyanotype Imperfections Published 2025. ISBN 978-1-915423-79-5 by GOST Books.

== Awards, Grants and Recognition ==
- 2011 "SOUP” Blurb Photobook Awards - Aperture Foundation, New York - Winner
- 2012 The Royal Photographic Society Environmental Bursary - Winner
- 2015 WYNG Masters Award - Hong Kong “WASTE” - Finalist
- 2015 LensCulture Earth15 Awards - Series Winner - Hong Kong Soup - Winner
- 2017 Prix Pictet Award ‘SPACE’ - 'Beyond Drifting: Imperfectly Known Animals' - Shortlisted
- 2017 Magnum Foundation Fund - Nominee
- 2018 National Geographic Society Grant for Research and Exploration
- 2019 Fellowship of the Royal Photographic Society (FRPS)
- 2019 Explorers Flag Expedition Award for the Expedition to Henderson Island
- 2019 The Deutsche Börse Foundation Photography Prize 2020 - ‘Our Plastic Ocean’ Touring exhibition - Nominee
- 2021 Leica Oskar Barnack Award - LUNASEA - Nominee
- 2022 Foam Paul Huf Award - Nominee
- 2023 Photographic Society of America - IUTP Award 2023 - Honouring living photographers whose work has had a unique impact on the world by focusing attention or changing perceptions.
- 2025 Arles Les Recontres de la Photographie 2025 Book Awards - Author Book Award - ‘Photographs of British Algae: Cyanotype Imperfections’ - Shortlisted
- 2025 The Deutsche Börse Foundation Photography Prize 2025 - ‘Photographs of British Algae: Cyanotype Imperfections’ - Nominee

== Voyages & Residencies ==
- 2012 Tsunami Debris Field Expedition North Pacific Ocean with 5Gyres 10th June – 8th July
- 2016 Greenpeace Beluga II Expedition, Inner Hebrides – Commission presented to Government
- 2019 Lord Howe Island – Residency with Adriftlab scientists
- 2019 Henderson Island Expedition with The Pew Charitable Trust, The UK Foreign and Commonwealth Office and Adriftlab – June
- 2023 The Society of Four Arts Florida - Residency & Workshop

== Media Coverage ==
- 2014 CNN ‘Connect The World’
- 2015 WYNG Masters Photography Award - Finalist
- 2016 UNESCO Biosphere Lanzarote, short film
- 2018 VICE IMPACT "Is circularity the solution to Ocean Plastic", with climate leader Christiana Figueres and designer Stella McCartney, short film
- 2019 “STILL(FFS)” - Lord Howe Island
- 2025 CBBC “Go Get Arty” Children’s BBC programme
- 2025 New Scientist "Visualising Britain's fashion waste problem with cyanotype photography"
