= Carl De Keyzer =

Belgian photographer (born 1958)

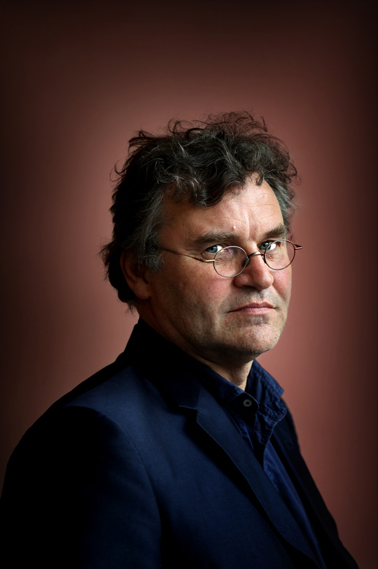
- Born: 27 December 1958 (age 67); Kortrijk, Belgium
- Occupations: documentary photographer, photojournalist

Carl De Keyzer (27 December 1958) is a Belgian photographer. Major subjects in his work have included the collapse of the Soviet Union, and India. He became a full member of Magnum Photos in 1994. De Keyzer has exhibited his work in many European galleries and has received several awards, including the Book Award from Rencontres d'Arles, the W. Eugene Smith Award and the Kodak Award.

== Career ==
De Keyzer was born on 27 December 1958, in Kortrijk, Belgium. His freelance career began in 1982, at which time he also taught at the Royal Academy of Fine Arts, Ghent, Belgium. During this time, he co-founded the XYZ-Photography Gallery.

Major subjects in his work have included the collapse of Soviet Union and India. Robert Koch gallery describes his work as investigating "marginalized social groups and constructs uncritical psychological portraits which work to familiarize the 'other.'"

He was nominated to the Magnum Photos agency in 1990, became an associated member in 1992 and a full member in 1994. He currently lives in Ghent and continues to teach.

In late 2024, he stirred controversy with a new book called Putin’s Dream, created with the help of AI. It is intended as a harsh criticism of Putin's Russia. The book drew both fierce criticism as well as praise for its pushing of boundaries, openness to working with new technologies and interrogating the place of AI in the future of photography. Magnum Photos have distanced themselves from the book.

== Publications ==
- Oogspanning, 1984,
- India, 1987 (Uitgeverig Focus 1999) ISBN 978-90-72216-01-4
- Homo Sovieticus/USSR-1989-CCCP, 1989 (Distributed Art Publishers 1993) ISBN 978-90-72216-11-3,
- God, Inc., 1992 (Uitgeverig Focus) ISBN 978-90-72216-22-9
- East of Eden. Ghent: Ludion, 1996. ISBN 90-5544-064-7
- Carl De Keyzer. Paris: Centre national de la photographie, 1997. ISBN 2-86754-110-7
- Europa, 2000 (Ludion Editions NV) ISBN 978-90-5544-287-4
- Zona, 2003 (Trolley Books) ISBN 978-0-9542648-4-0
- Trinity, 2008 (Schilt) ISBN 978-90-5330-594-2
- Congo (Belge) (Editions Lannoo) ISBN 978-90-209-8682-2
- Moments Before The Flood, 2012
- Higher Ground, 2016
- Cuba La Lucha, 2016
- DPR Korea Grand Tour, 2017

== Awards ==
- 1982, First Prize – Experimental Film, Festival for Young Belgian Filmmakers, Brussels, Belgium
- 1986, Hasselblad Award Belgium, Brussels, Belgium
- 1986, Grand Prix de la Triennale de la photographie, Photographie Ouverte, musée de la photographie à Charleroi, Charleroi, Belgium
- 1988, Grand Prix de la Triennale de la Ville de Fribourg, Switzerland
- 1990, Louis Paul Boon Award, Ghent, Belgium
- 1990, Prix du Livre, Rencontres d'Arles, Arles, France
- 1990, W. Eugene Smith Award, New York City
- 1992, Prix Kodak de la critique photographique, Paris
- 1995, Annual Fine Arts Award Belgium, Brussels, Belgium
- 2008, Shortlisted, Prix Pictet for Moments before the Flood

== Collections ==
De Keyzer's work is held in the following collections:

- Stedelijk Museum voor Actuele Kunst, Ghent, Belgium
- Photography Museum, Charleroi, Belgium
- Fotomuseum Antwerp, Antwerp, Belgium
- Fnac Collection, Paris, France
- Ministry of Culture, Brussels, Belgium
- International Center of Photography, New York
- Centro de Arte, Salamanca, Spain
- Magnum Photos Collection, Harry Ransom Center, University of Texas at Austin

== Exhibitions ==
- Zona, Impressions Gallery, York, UK, 2005
