= Robert Storr =

Robert Storr may refer to:

- Robert Storr (art academic)
- Robert Storr (banker)
