= Maxim Dondyuk =

Ukrainian photographer

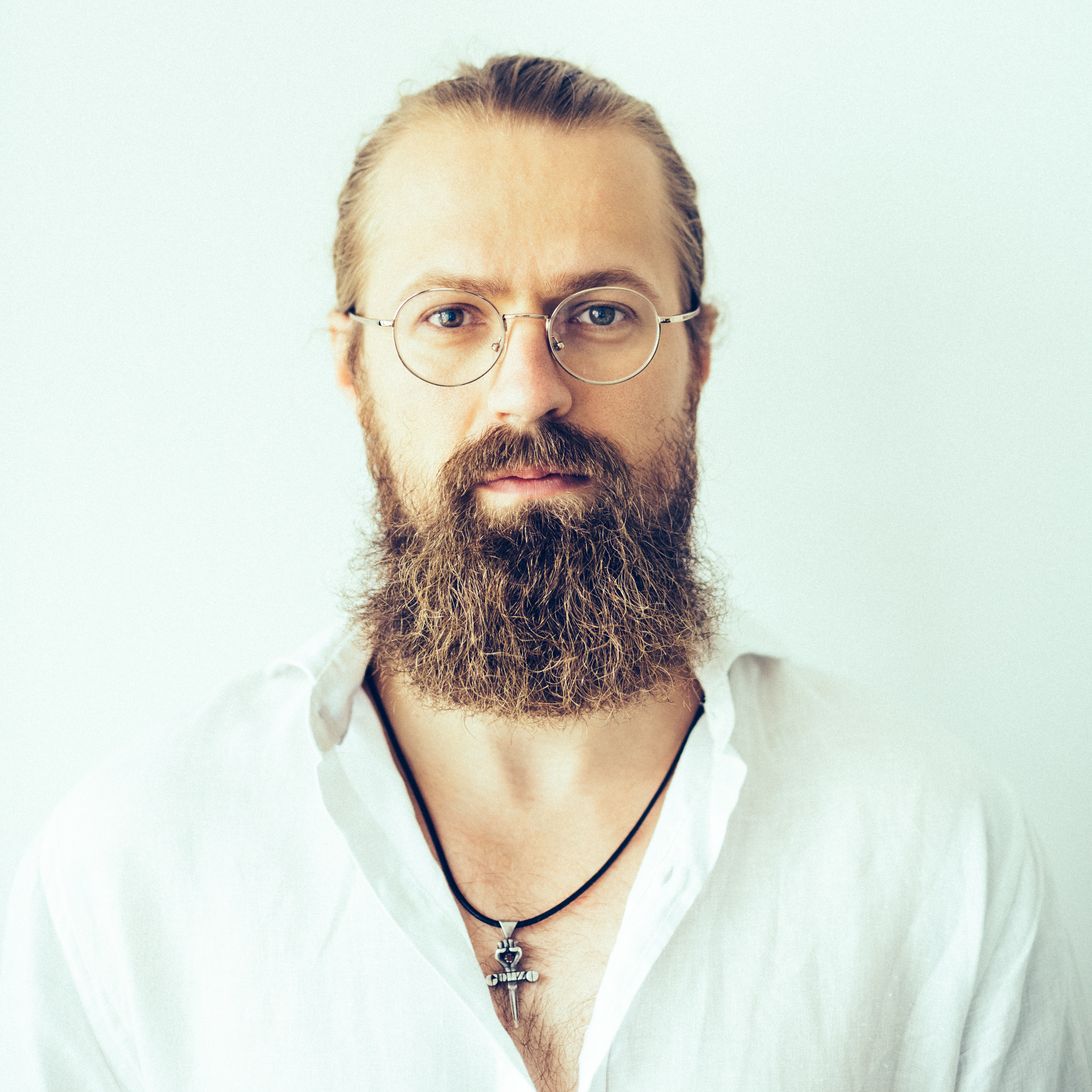
- Born: 1983 (age 42–43); Slavuta, Ukrainian SSR
- Occupations: Photographer, documentary photographer.
- Awards: W. Eugene Smith Grant in Humanistic Photography, International Photographer of the Year Lucie Awards (IPA), finalist in Prix Pictet 'Disorder' award
- Website: maximdondyuk.com

Maxim Dondyuk (Ukrainian: Максим Дондюк; born 1983) is a Ukrainian photographer and visual artist, who combines photography, video, text, and archival material in his work. He explores issues of history, memory, conflicts, and their consequences.

Dondyuk's work has been exhibited internationally in solo and group exhibitions, at the Musée d'Art Moderne in Paris, Somerset House in London, and MAXXI in Rome. In 2016 he was awarded an artist residency Cité Internationale des Arts in Paris.

== Life and work ==
Dondyuk was born in the Ukrainian SSR. His projects include TB epidemic in Ukraine (2010–2012), a two-year work that investigates the problem of tuberculosis in Ukraine; Crimea Sich (2010–2013), a series of photographs and a short documentary film, which tells about a military upbringing of children in the secret camp in the Crimea Mountains; Between Life and Death (2017), a personal reflection on the aftermath of wars through the ruins and devastated landscapes; Culture of Confrontation (2013–2014), dedicated to the events of the Ukrainian Revolution 2013/14, which in 2019 resulted in the book of the same name; Untitled Project from Chornobyl (2016–ongoing), where Dondyuk works with found photographs in the restricted areas of the Chernobyl Exclusion Zone

His work has been published in magazines such as Time, Der Spiegel, Stern, Paris Match, Rolling Stone, Photo District News, Bloomberg Businessweek, Russian Reporter, Libération, Polka, 6Mois and Esquire. He also works with international organizations, such as International Committee of the Red Cross and the World Health Organization.

== Publications ==
- Culture of Confrontation. Self-published, 2019.

== Films ==
- Crimea Sich (2013) – short film
- Culture of Confrontation – video installation

== Awards ==
- 2012: Grand Prix Best Global Health Story of Becton Dickinson (BD)'s Hope for a Healthy World Photo Competition
- 2012: Finalist for a grant of The Manuel Rivera-Ortiz Foundation for Documentary Photography & Film
- 2013: Shortlist in the Portraiture category of Sony World Photography Awards
- 2013: Finalist of the W. Eugene Smith Grant in Humanistic Photography from W. Eugene Smith Memorial Fund
- 2014: Magnum Photos competition '30 under 30' for emerging documentary photographers
- 2014: Winner of the Ville de Perpignan Remi Ochlik Award
- 2015: Winner of the Photo District News Photo Annual 2015 in documentary category
- 2015: Prix de la Photographie, Paris, Press War Category, 1st Prize
- 2015: Prix Pictet Photography Prize is Disorder, Shortlist
- 2015: 1st place in Editorial: General News category, 13th Annual Lucie Awards (IPA)
- 2015: Editorial Photographer of the Year, Lucie Awards (IPA)
- 2015: International Photographer of the Year, Lucie Awards (IPA)
- 2016: LensCulture Exposure Awards, 3rd Prize Series
- 2016: Magnum Photography Awards, Finalist
- 2017: W. Eugene Smith Grant in Humanistic Photography, Finalist
- 2021: Ukrainian Cultural Fund, Grant recipient
- 2022: Polka Award for Photographer of the Year
- 2022: Recipient of the W. Eugene Smith Grant in Humanistic Photography from the W. Eugene Smith Memorial Fund for Ukraine 2014/22

== Exhibitions ==
=== Solo exhibitions ===
- 2011: Tuberculosis, Center of Documentary Photography «Fotodoc», Moscow
- 2012: TB epidemic in Ukraine, Donetsk; Zaporizhzhia; Uzhhorod; Vinnytsia; Dnipro, Ukraine
- 2013: Uman, Rosh Hashanah, Gallery Camera, Kyiv, Ukraine
- 2013: Culture of Confrontation, Ministry of Foreign Affairs of Ukraine, Kyiv, Ukraine
- 2018: Past. Present. Future., M17 Contemporary Art Center, Kyiv, Ukraine
- 2019: Culture of Confrontation, Municipal Museum im Kornhouse, Kirchheim unter Teck, Germany; Municipal Gallery Ehingen, Germany
- 2021: Untitled project from Chornobyl, The Ministry of Foreign Affairs of Ukraine, Kyiv, Ukraine
- 2022: Russian Invasion of Ukraine, the House of Lucie, Budapest, Hungary
- 2022: Modern Ukrainian landscape, Ya Gallery Center, Lviv, Ukraine
- 2022: Fight back / Відсіч, Dukat gallery, Kyiv, Ukraine
- 2023: Ukraine 2014/22, Municipal Gallery Ehingen, Germany

=== Group exhibitions ===
- 2014: Road to Freedom, Checkpoint Charlie Museum, Berlin
- 2014: Apocalypse of the 20th Century, Museum of The History of Ukraine in World War II, Kyiv, Ukraine
- 2014: Culture of Confrontation, Visa pour l'image, Perpignan, France
- 2015–2017: Culture of Confrontation as a part of Prix Pictet Disorder finalists: Musée d'Art Moderne, Paris; CAB Art Center, Brussels, Belgium; Kunstverein, Hamburg, Germany; International Red Cross and Red Crescent Museum, Geneva, Switzerland; LUMA Westbau – Löwenbräukunst, Zurich, Switzerland; MAXXI, National Museum of XXI Century Arts, Rome, Italy; The Old Municipal Gallery, Athens, Greece; Somerset House, London; Bank Gallery, Tokyo; Dublin Gallery of Photography, Dublin, Ireland; Palau Robert, Barcelona, Spain; Museum of Photographic Arts, San Diego, USA
- 2020: Untitled Project from Chornobyl, Vintage Photo Festival, Bydgoszcz, Poland
- 2020: Dealing with Memory, Frappant Gallery, Hamburg, Germany
- 2023: Between Life and Death, Le Carré d'Art, Chartres de Bretagne, France
- 2023: Ukraine 2014/22, Fondazione Imago Mundi, Gallerie delle Prigioni, Treviso, Italy
- 2023: War. Ukraine 2022, Le bleu du ciel, Lyon, France

== Screenings ==
- Crimea Sich, American Independence Film Festival, Kyiv, Ukraine, 2013
- Culture of Confrontation video installation, The Church of Saint-Merri, Paris, 2015; Museum of Photographic Arts, San Diego, USA, 2017; Ukraine 2022, PHOTO ELYSÉE, Lausanne, Switzerland, 2023
