= Daniel Beltrá =

American photojournalist

- Born: 1964 (age 61–62); Madrid, Spain
- Education: Complutense University of Madrid; Technical University of Madrid
- Known for: Fine art aerial photography documenting human impact on the environment.
- Style: Aerial and conservation Photography
- Movement: Environmental Art, Activist Art
- Awards: Wildlife Photographer of the Year (2011)>br>Lucie Award for International Photographer of the Year – Deeper Perspective (2011); World Press Photo (Nature Stories, 2006 & 2007; Environmental Stories, 2018); Prince's Rainforest Project Award (2009); BBVA Foundation Award for Environmental Communication (2013).

Daniel Beltrá (born 1964) is a Spanish photographer and artist who makes work about human impact on the environment.

The focus of Beltrá's recent work has been fine art aerial photography of landscapes and environmental issues. His best known project is a series of photographs of the Deepwater Horizon oil spill, titled Spill, which have been exhibited in galleries and museums across Europe and North America. Other topics he has photographed are tropical deforestation in Brazil, Indonesia, and the Democratic Republic of the Congo and global warming in the Arctic, Patagonia and the Southern Ocean. In September 2012, he documented the record-lowest summer sea ice level in the Arctic, which were later included in his "Ice" exhibition.

== Life and work ==
Beltrá started his career with photos of bombings by the Basque separatist organization Euskadi Ta Askatasuna (ETA) while he was a student at the Complutense University of Madrid. He went on to work at EFE and the Gamma photo agency while also photographing assignments for Greenpeace. He is a board member of the International League of Conservation Photographers. He moved to Seattle in 2001.

Beltrá has presented his work in slideshows and lectures at galleries and conferences across North America, including the 9th World Wilderness Congress, the Annenberg Space for Photography, the Aquarium of the Pacific, and the ABC Continuity Forum.

Beltrá was granted a commission by Charles, Prince of Wales for the Prince's Rainforests Project (PRP) to document the status of the world's great tropical rainforests in 2009.

== Artistic Influence & Legacy ==
Daniel Beltrá's work is notable within the field of environmental photography for his stylistic use of aerial photography.

Beltrá's approach to photography is deeply rooted in his belief that art can be a powerful tool for change. He often cites the work of Ansel Adams and Sebastião Salgado as major influences, both of whom used their photography to advocate for environmental conservation. Beltrá, however, has taken this tradition to new heights—literally—by focusing on aerial photography, which provides a broader, more impactful view of the landscapes under threat.

His work has also influenced the broader art community. Several contemporary artists and photographers have credited Beltrá with inspiring them to explore environmental themes in their work. His photographs have been featured in art books, documentaries, and even fashion campaigns, where his images are used to highlight the connection between consumer behavior and environmental degradation.

In academia, Beltrá's photography is studied in courses on environmental science, visual arts, and media studies. His ability to communicate complex environmental issues through visual storytelling has made his work a case study in the power of images to drive public awareness and policy change.

In 2023, Beltrá was honored with a retrospective exhibition at the Tate Modern in London, showcasing his most iconic works alongside new, unreleased pieces. The exhibition was widely praised for its emotional depth and artistic innovation, solidifying Beltrá's legacy as one of the most important environmental photographers of his generation.

Through his photography, Beltrá has not only documented the state of the planet but has also inspired countless individuals to take action in preserving its beauty for future generations. His legacy continues to grow as new projects and collaborations bring his work to an even wider audience.

== Publications ==
- Spill. London: Gost, 2013. ISBN 978-0-9574272-4-2. With an essay by Barbara Bloemink. Edition of 2500 copies.

== Exhibitions ==
- Benham Gallery, Seattle. Sustainability / Sostenibilidad, May 2009 – July 2009.
- City Hall, Paris. Prince's Rainforests Exhibition, October 2009.
- Kew Botanical Gardens, London. Prince's Rainforests exhibition, October–December 2009.
- 212 Gallery, Aspen. Spill, August–December 2010.
- Seattle Aquarium, Seattle. Spill, May–August 2011.
- Aquarium of the Pacific, Long Beach, Calif. Spill, October 2011 – January 2012.
- Roca Gallery, Barcelona. Marea Negra, October 2011 – January 2012.
- Catherine Edleman Gallery, Chicago. Spill, March–June 2012.
- "Power", Prix Pictet touring exhibition, toured the world, including London, Paris, and Istanbul.
- Somerset House, London. Landmark, Fields of Photography March–April 2013.
- Quintenz Gallery, Aspen. Ice, December 2012 – February 2013.
- Aperture Gallery, New York. Power, November 2013 – February 2014.
- Museum of Photographic Arts, San Diego. Power, February–April 2014.
- Lentos Kunstmuseum, Linz, Austria. Pure Water, October 2014 – February 2015.

== Awards ==
- 2006: 3rd prize, World Press Photo awards, nature series category, for his work on the Amazon rainforest drought
- 2006: Golden Award, China Press International Photo (CHIPP) Contest, for his work on the Amazon Rainforest drought
- 2007: 2nd prize, World Press Photo awards, contemporary issues category, for a photo of tropical deforestation in the Amazon
- 2009: Global Vision Award, Pictures of the Year International
- 2011: Winner, Veolia Environment Wildlife Photographer of the Year and the "Deeper Perspective of the Year" from the International Photography Awards for his photographs from the Gulf Oil spill
- 2012: Shortlisted, 2012 Prix Pictet
- 2013: Knowledge Dissemination and Communication in Biodiversity Conservation award, BBVA Foundation, Spain
- 2014: First place, Nature and Environment category, China Press International Photo contest
- 2018: Nominated, World Press Photo of the Year, World Press Photo, Amsterdam
