= Robert Storr (banker) =

Robert Walter Storr
- Born: 17 September 1920; Newcastle, New South Wales
- Died: 15 February 1992 (aged 71); Sydney, New South Wales
- Education: Newington College
- Occupation: Banking
- Spouse(s): Single; Never married

Robert Walter Storr (17 September 1920 – 15 February 1992) was an Australian-born banker active in Southeast Asia and his country of birth. After his death he became notable as a philanthropist with bequests in medical science and music education.

== Birth and education ==
Storr was born in Newcastle, New South Wales, and was aged eight his family moved to a rural property between Forbes and Grenfell. His early education was in the multi-class schoolroom at Ooma Creek Public School before attending Newington College as a boarder (1935–1936). He left school at 15 to return to the land.

== Banking career ==
Realising that he was not suited to farm life, Storr joined the Commonwealth Bank in 1939. After war service he returned to the bank and worked in both Australia and Papua New Guinea. From 1958 until 1963, Storr lived in Kuala Lumpur and was the Assistant to the Governor of Bank Negara Malaysia. After his return to Australia he became the first Principal of the Commonwealth Bank Staff Training College (later known as Callaghan Staff College, but now disbanded). In 1971, Storr moved to Jakarta and became Principal of the Training College for Indonesian Bankers before re-establishing the Jakarta Stock Exchange in 1977. In 1982 he moved to Singapore to start an office for the Commonwealth Bank and after his retirement he remained there and consulted to Westpac as a financial advisor.

== Honours ==
For his work with the central bank of Malaysia he was made an Officer of the Order of the Defender of the Realm (K.M.N.) by the then King of Malaysia, Putra of Perlis.

== War service ==
From May 1941 until November 1943, Storr served as a sergeant with the Australian Army in World War II.

== Golf ==
During his time in Malaysia, Storr became the Captain of the Royal Selangor Golf Club. He was the first Captain of the Jagorawi Golf and Country Club in Indonesia.

== Bequests ==
- The Robert W Storr Chair of Hepatic Medicine was established in 1993 under an A$5 million legacy to the University of Sydney. It funds Professor Jacob George to undertake research that focuses on non-alcoholic steatohepatitis and hepatic fibrosis. The bequest also funds research into the molecular and cellular basis for disease progression in chronic hepatitis C.
- Robert Walter Storr Music Bursary was established in 1993 under an A$1 million legacy to Newington College. The Bursary is awarded to a boy of exceptional musical ability who is a resident of Indonesia, Malaysia or Singapore and who is eligible to enter Years 9, 10 or 11 (14–17 years of age) whose financial means would not otherwise enable them to study in Australia. The Storr Bursary covers all normal tuition and boarding fees at Newington, as well as music fees, Higher School Certificate or International Baccalaureate Diploma charges, health cover and a return airfare from the country of normal residency.
