= John Chiara =

American contemporary artist and photographer

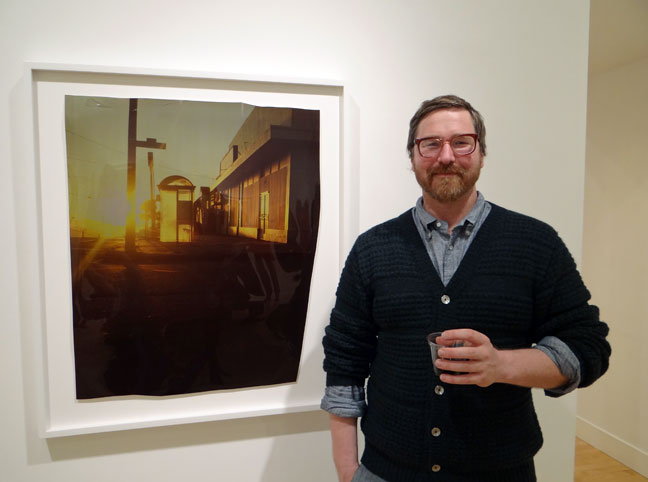
- John Chiara at Haines Gallery
- Born: 1971 (age 54–55); San Francisco, California
- Education: B.F.A. – University of Utah; M.F.A. – California College of the Arts
- Known for: Fine Art Photography
- Website: www.johnchiara.com

John Chiara (born in 1971, in San Francisco, California) is an American contemporary artist and photographer.

== Education ==
Chiara holds a B.F.A. from the University of Utah (1995) and an M.F.A. in photography from the California College of the Arts (2004) where he studied with Larry Sultan.

== Career ==
Chiara builds custom large-format cameras, and exposes his images directly onto hand-cut photographic paper. He built his first camera in 1997.

== Exhibitions ==
=== Solo ===
- 2017: John Chiara Lands End: California at Larkin, Haines Gallery, San Francisco, CA.
- 2017: John Chiara: New Cityscapes, Crown Point Press, San Francisco, CA
- 2018: John Chiara: California/Mississippi, Galerie Miranda, Paris, France.
- 2018: Pike Slip to Sugar Hill, Yossi Milo Gallery, New York, NY.
- 2021: John Chiara: La Poussière des Anges, Galerie Miranda, Paris, France.

=== Group ===
- 2012: Here, Pier 24 Photography, San Francisco, CA.
- 2013: Twsited Sisters: Reimaging Urban Portraiture, Museum Bärengasse, Zurich, CH.
- 2013: Crown Point Press at 50, de Young Museum, Fine Arts Museums of San Francisco, San Francisco, CA.
- 2014: A Sense of Place, Pier 24 Photography, San Francisco, CA.
- 2015: Light, Paper, Process, Reinventing Photography, Curated by Virginia Heckert, J. Paul Getty Museum, Los Angeles, CA.
- 2016: Boundless: A California Invitational, Museum of Photographic Arts, San Diego, CA.
- 2016: A Matter of Memory, George Eastman Museum, Rochester, NY.
- 2018: New Southern Photography, Ogden Museum of Southern Art, New Orleans, LA.
- 2018: Triennale de l’art imprimé contemporain, Musée des beaux-arts, Le Locle, CH.
- 2018: A Brilliant Spectrum: Recent Gifts of Color Photography, Santa Barbara Museum of Art, Santa Barbara, CA.
- 2018: New Territory Landscape Photography Today, Denver Art Museum, Denver, CO.

== Publications ==
=== Publications by Chiara ===
- John Chiara: California. New York: Aperture; San Francisco, Pier 24 Photography, 2017. ISBN 978-1597114233

=== Publications with contributions by Chiara ===
- Here., San Francisco: Pier 24 Photography, 2011. ISBN 978-0-9839917-0-0.
- A Sense of Place, San Francisco: Pier 24 Photography, 2015. ISBN 978-0-9839917-4-8. Exhibition catalog.
- Light, Paper, Process: Reinventing Photography, Los Angeles, J. Paul Getty Museum, 2015. ISBN 978-1606064375

== Collections ==
Chiara's work is held in the following public collections:

- J. Paul Getty Museum, Los Angeles, CA.
- Los Angeles County Museum of Art, CA.
- National Gallery of Art, Washington, D.C.
- Pier 24 Photography, San Francisco, CA.
- San Francisco Museum of Modern Art, San Francisco, CA.
