= Marco Breuer =

German photographer (born 1966)

- Born: 1966 (age 59–60); Landshut, Bavaria, Germany
- Education: Darmstadt University of Applied Sciences
- Occupation: Photographer

Marco Breuer (born 1966) is a German photographer. Much of his work is undertaken without the aid of a camera, aperture, or film, being instead produced through a combination of photogrammic, abrasive, and incisive techniques.

Breuer works in and outside of the darkroom, exposing photographic material to heat, light, and physical abrasion. Drawing implements have included 12-gauge shotguns, the guts of electric frying pans, modified turntables, razor blades, and power sanders.

Breuer's photographic techniques include recent works on chromogenic paper to early black-and-white photograms, gum bichromate prints, silkscreens, artist books, and unlimited newsprint editions.

Breuer was born in Landshut. He received a degree in photography from Lette-Verein Berlin in 1988 and later attended Hochschule Darmstadt–University of Applied Sciences, graduating with an advanced degree in photography in 1992. He is the recipient of a Guggenheim fellowship. He has been a guest lecturer at the Yale School of Art, Rutgers University, Princeton University, and the San Francisco Art Institute, among others; and has taught photography at New York’s School of Visual Arts, and in the MFA program at Bard College. Breuer lives in upstate New York.

== Exhibitions ==
One-person museum exhibitions include Line of Sight at the de Young Museum in San Francisco (2011), New Pictures 2: Marco Breuer at the Minneapolis Institute of Arts (2010), and Circa 1999 at the MIT List Visual Arts Center in Cambridge, Massachusetts (2001). His work has been included in group exhibitions at the Metropolitan Museum of Art, Museum of Modern Art, the Morgan Library & Museum, the International Center of Photography, the Drawing Center, and White Columns in New York; the Amon Carter Museum in Fort Worth, Texas; and the High Museum of Art in Atlanta, Georgia.

The artist is represented by Yossi Milo Gallery in New York.

== Collections ==
- Ackland Art Museum, University of North Carolina at Chapel Hill, NC
- Albright–Knox Art Gallery, Buffalo, NY
- Art Institute of Chicago, Chicago, IL
- Baltimore Museum of Art, Baltimore, MD
- Carnegie Museum of Art, Pittsburgh, PA
- Columbus Museum of Art, Columbus, OH
- Cornell Fine Arts Museum, Rollins University, Winter Park, FL
- Davis Museum, Wellesley College, Wellesley, MA
- de Young Museum, San Francisco, CA
- Fogg Art Museum at Harvard University, Cambridge, MA
- Fotomuseum im Münchner Stadtmuseum, Munich, Germany
- George Eastman House, Rochester, NY
- Harry Ransom Center, University of Texas at Austin, Austin, TX
- International Center of Photography, New York, NY
- J. Paul Getty Museum, Los Angeles, CA
- Legion of Honor – Achenbach Collection, San Francisco, CA
- Metropolitan Museum of Art, New York, NY
- Milwaukee Art Museum, Milwaukee, WI
- Minneapolis Institute of Arts, Minneapolis, MN
- Museum of Fine Arts, Boston, MA
- Museum of Fine Arts, Houston, TX
- Museum of Modern Art, New York, NY
- National Gallery of Art, Washington, DC
- Nelson-Atkins Museum of Art, Kansas City, MO
- New School, New York, NY
- New York Public Library – Spencer Collection, New York, NY
- Norton Museum of Art, West Palm Beach, FL
- Princeton University Art Museum, Princeton, NJ
- San Francisco Museum of Modern Art, San Francisco, CA
- Spencer Museum of Art, Lawrence, KS
- Staatsgalerie Stuttgart, Stuttgart, Germany
- Yale University Art Gallery, New Haven, CT

== Publications ==
- Tremors, Ephemera, published by Roth Horowitz, New York, 2000. Essay by James Elkins. (ISBN 978-0-9670774-3-7)
- SMTWTFS, published by Roth Horowitz, New York, 2002. Texts by Lynne Tillman, Richard Howard, Adam Klein, Evan Hause, and others. (ISBN 978-0967077482)
- Early Recordings published by Aperture, New York, 2007. Essay by Mark Alice Durant. (ISBN 978-1597110334)
- Col•or, published by Black Dog Publishing, London, 2014. Essays by Mary-Kay Lombino, Jeffrey DeShell, and Isabelle Dervaux. (ISBN 978-1-908966-90-2)

== Awards ==
- The Larry Sultan Photography Award (2016)
