= Foam Fotografiemuseum Amsterdam =

Foam
- Fotografiemuseum Amsterdam
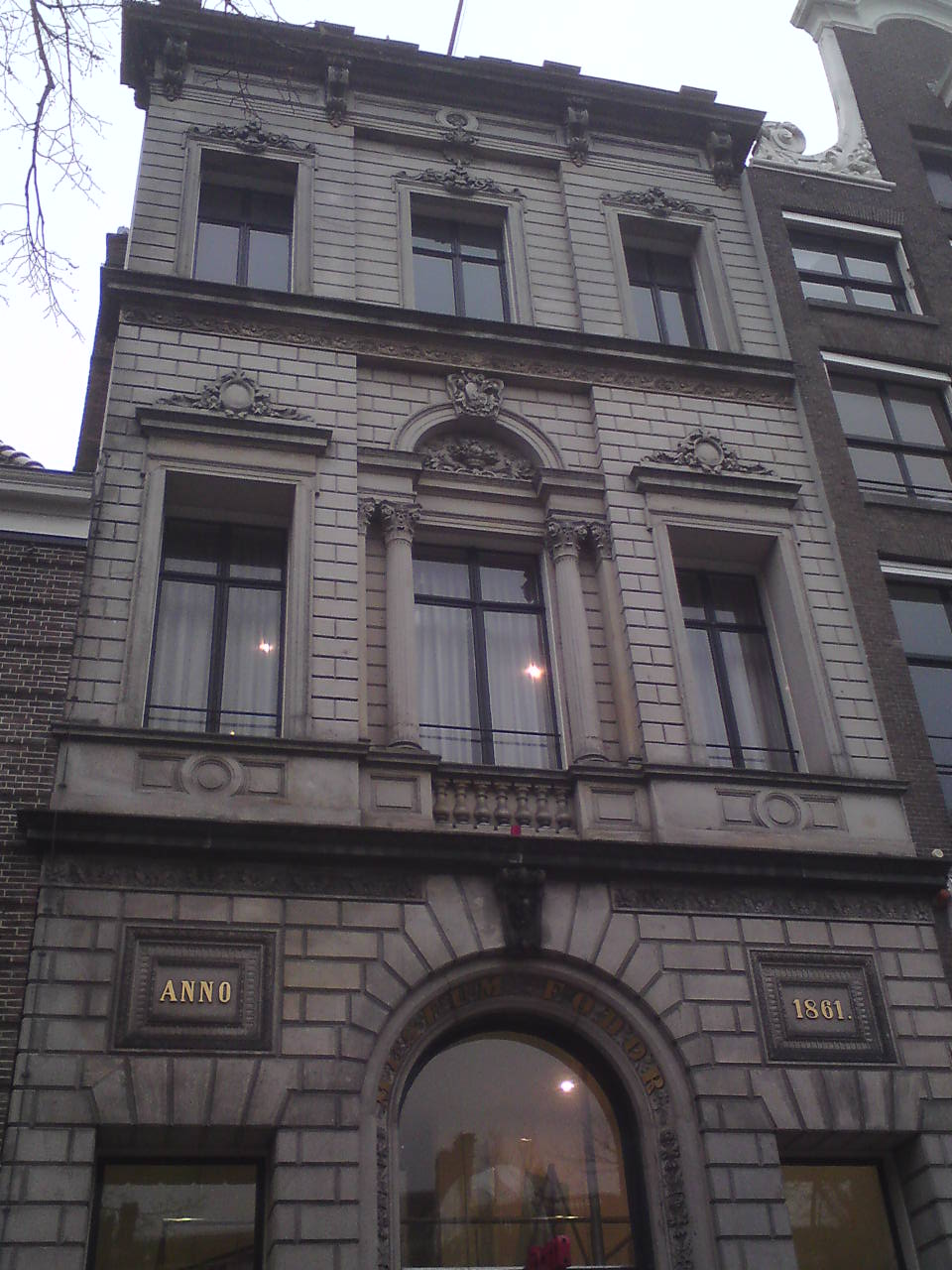
- Museum at the Keizersgracht in 2011

- Location in the city center of Amsterdam
- Established: 13 December 2001
- Location: Keizersgracht 609; Amsterdam, Netherlands
- Coordinates: 52°21′50″N 4°53′37″E
- Type: Photography museum
- Visitors: 193,000 (2019)
- Director: Karin van Gilst
- Website: www.foam.org

Foam or Fotografiemuseum Amsterdam is a photography museum located on Keizersgracht in Amsterdam, the Netherlands. The museum has four different exhibitions at any given time in which different photographic genres are shown, such as documentary, art and fashion. Next to large exhibitions by well-known photographers, Foam also shows the work of young and upcoming photographers, in shorter running exhibitions.

Two notable shows were Henri Cartier-Bresson - A Retrospective, work by Henri Cartier-Bresson, and Richard Avedon - Photographs 1946–2004, a major retrospective of Richard Avedon. In summer 2016, Foam presented a major Helmut Newton retrospective exhibition.

The museum contains a café, a library, a bookshop, and a commercial gallery called Foam Editions. The museum also publishes a quarterly international photography magazine called Foam Magazine.

== Building ==
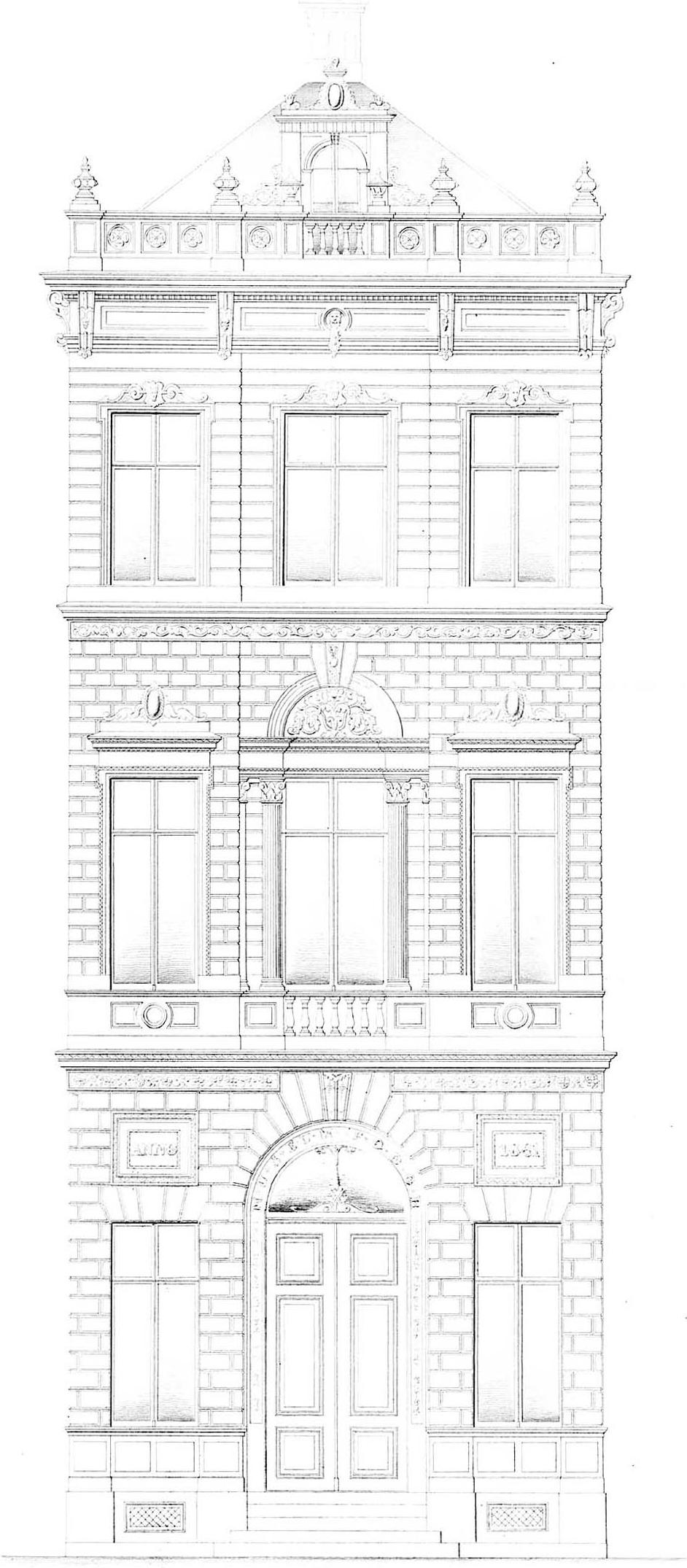
Design of Museum Fodor

The museum is in the historic Grachtengordel neighborhood of Amsterdam, across the Keizergracht from Museum Van Loon. The building in which Foam is located has a history dating back to Carel Joseph Fodor (1801–1860). Fodor first bought Keizersgracht 611, and later also bought the adjacent warehouse and residential house at Keizersgracht 609. Fodor destined the warehouse in his testament as the exhibition space that should receive the name Museum Fodor. Between 1863 and 1994, Museum Fodor was open to the public. Between 1994 and 2001 the Nederlands Vormgevingsinstituut was located in these buildings.

== History ==
Foam received permission in November 2001 from the city council for the start-up. On 13 December 2001, Foam opened its first exhibition Dutch Delight. More than 7000 people visited the exhibition in which Dutch light played a prominent or self-evident role.

After the opening exhibition the museum closed for renovation. Architects BenthemCrouwel turned three buildings at the Keizersgracht into a modern museum. The first exhibition in the new museum, was called Regie: Paul Huf, Paul Huf together with Eva Besnyö being the originator of the museum. The official opening took place on 6 June 2002. The exhibition was visited by approximately 8000 people.

== Exhibition policy ==
Every year, Foam organises four large exhibitions by particularly notable photographers, usually running for about three months. In conjunction, about 16 shorter running exhibitions are organised by the museum, which can be very different in character: either the work of relatively young photographers, or a specific project, work that is currently relevant, small retrospectives or the presentation of new developments within the medium. Emphasis is generally on documentary photography, street photography, portrait and glamour photography, and young and upcoming talents.

Documentary photography exhibitions at Foam have included Avenue Patrice Lumumba by Guy Tillim, The Hyena & Other Men by Pieter Hugo, In the Shadow of Things by Leonie Purchas, and Calais - From Jungle to City by Henk Wildschut. Street photography exhibitions have included Helen Levitt's In the Street, a retrospective by Weegee and Tom Wood’s Photieman. Portrait or glamour exhibitions have included Chemises by Malick Sidibé, People of the 20th Century by August Sander and Blessings from Mousganistan by Mous Lamrabat. Under the denominator Foam_3h, small shows by young photographers are presented under the Foam library. Recent examples include Control by Emilie Hudig and A Place to Wash the Heart by Monieka Bielskyte.

== Foam Paul Huf Award ==
Since 2007, Foam has been organising the Paul Huf Award, a prize that is awarded to a young, talented photographer under the age of 35. The award was at one time known as the KLM Paul Huf Award.

== Foam Magazine ==
Foam Magazine is a photography magazine published three times a year. Each issue is dedicated to a specific theme that is explored through work by both world-renowned image makers and newer, emerging talents. Accompanying essays, interviews and opinions by experts in the field come together to shape an in-depth and critical conversation. Foam Magazine has been the recipient of several awards for its high-grade graphic design and quality of content.
