= List of Guggenheim Fellowships awarded in 2023 =

List of Guggenheim Fellowships awarded in 2023:

Fellow	Category	Field of Study
Lucas Bessire	Social Sciences	Anthropology & Cultural Studies
Michael Cepek	Social Sciences	Anthropology & Cultural Studies
Emily Mendenhall	Social Sciences	Anthropology & Cultural Studies
David Scott	Social Sciences	Anthropology & Cultural Studies
Erkki Somersalo	Natural Sciences	Applied Mathematics
Elizabeth Currid-Halkett	Humanities	Architecture, Planning, & Design
Sonia A. Hirt	Humanities	Architecture, Planning, & Design
Inga Saffron	Humanities	Architecture, Planning, & Design
Diana Valencia Pineda	Natural Sciences	Astronomy – Astrophysics
David Greenberg	Creative Arts	Biography
Monica Dus	Natural Sciences	Biology
Felicia Keesing	Natural Sciences	Biology
Julius B. Lucks	Natural Sciences	Biology
Gordana Dukovic	Natural Sciences	Chemistry
Jon Kinzel	Creative Arts	Choreography
Liz Lerman	Creative Arts	Choreography
Makini (jumatatu m. poe)	Creative Arts	Choreography
Richard Move	Creative Arts	Choreography
Meg Stuart	Creative Arts	Choreography
Nejla Yatkin	Creative Arts	Choreography
Elspeth R. M. Dusinberre	Humanities	Classics
Alex Purves	Humanities	Classics
Anima Anandkumar	Natural Sciences	Computer Science
Venkatesan Guruswami	Natural Sciences	Computer Science
Ronitt Rubinfeld	Natural Sciences	Computer Science
Edward B. Foley	Social Sciences	Constitutional Studies
Kelly Copper	Creative Arts	Drama & Performance Art
Celeste Lecesne	Creative Arts	Drama & Performance Art
Pavol Liska	Creative Arts	Drama & Performance Art
Celeste Bedford Walker	Creative Arts	Drama & Performance Art
Kristina Wong	Creative Arts	Drama & Performance Art
Elizabeth B. Bearden	Humanities	Early Modern Studies
Tanya Pollard	Humanities	Early Modern Studies
Stephen R. Meyers	Natural Sciences	Earth Science
Amy Stanley	Humanities	East Asian Studies
Federico Rosei	Natural Sciences	Engineering
Deborah Lutz	Humanities	English Literature
David L. Hoffmann	Humanities	European & Latin American History
Stefani Engelstein	Humanities	European & Latin American Literature
Lucy Corin	Creative Arts	Fiction
Kali Fajardo-Anstine	Creative Arts	Fiction
James Hannaham	Creative Arts	Fiction
Jac Jemc	Creative Arts	Fiction
Don Lee	Creative Arts	Fiction
Rebecca Lee	Creative Arts	Fiction
Héctor Tobar	Creative Arts	Fiction
Jacqueline Woodson	Creative Arts	Fiction
Amber Bay Bemak	Creative Arts	Film-Video
Alex Camilleri	Creative Arts	Film-Video
Todd Chandler	Creative Arts	Film-Video
Maris Curran	Creative Arts	Film-Video
Mamadou Dia	Creative Arts	Film-Video
Mariam Ghani	Creative Arts	Film-Video
Jon-Sesrie Goff	Creative Arts	Film-Video
Larry Gottheim	Creative Arts	Film-Video
Idrissou Mora-Kpai	Creative Arts	Film-Video
Samantha Nye	Creative Arts	Film-Video
Sierra Pettengill	Creative Arts	Film-Video
Martine Syms	Creative Arts	Film-Video
Sheri Wills	Creative Arts	Film-Video
Sasha Wortzel	Creative Arts	Film-Video
Adam Lowenstein	Creative Arts	Film, Video, & New Media Studies
Olga Balema	Creative Arts	Fine Arts
Claudia Bitrán	Creative Arts	Fine Arts
Maura Brewer	Creative Arts	Fine Arts
Madison Brookshire	Creative Arts	Fine Arts
Pamela Council	Creative Arts	Fine Arts
Jamal Cyrus	Creative Arts	Fine Arts
Betsy Damon	Creative Arts	Fine Arts
Sharon Daniel	Creative Arts	Fine Arts
Anna Friz	Creative Arts	Fine Arts
Andrea Geyer	Creative Arts	Fine Arts
Kapwani Kiwanga	Creative Arts	Fine Arts
Mary Mattingly	Creative Arts	Fine Arts
Jiha Moon	Creative Arts	Fine Arts
Lavar Munroe	Creative Arts	Fine Arts
Erin Jane Nelson	Creative Arts	Fine Arts
Joan Nelson	Creative Arts	Fine Arts
Diane Severin Nguyen	Creative Arts	Fine Arts
Tammy Nguyen	Creative Arts	Fine Arts
Kelly Nipper	Creative Arts	Fine Arts
John Jerome O’Connor	Creative Arts	Fine Arts
Rachel Rotenberg	Creative Arts	Fine Arts
Jessica Segall	Creative Arts	Fine Arts
Evita Tezeno	Creative Arts	Fine Arts
Jordan Weber	Creative Arts	Fine Arts
Tetsuya Yamada	Creative Arts	Fine Arts
Bridget Alsdorf	Humanities	Fine Arts Research
Roland Betancourt	Humanities	Fine Arts Research
Arlene Dávila	Humanities	Fine Arts Research
Dodie Bellamy	Creative Arts	General Nonfiction
Liana Finck	Creative Arts	General Nonfiction
Jeff Hobbs	Creative Arts	General Nonfiction
Beth Macy	Creative Arts	General Nonfiction
Edward McPherson	Creative Arts	General Nonfiction
Danielle Ofri	Creative Arts	General Nonfiction
Roger Rosenblatt	Creative Arts	General Nonfiction
Abraham Verghese	Creative Arts	General Nonfiction
Kao Kalia Yang	Creative Arts	General Nonfiction
Andrew Herod	Natural Sciences	Geography & Environmental Studies
Margaret Wickens Pearce	Natural Sciences	Geography & Environmental Studies
Jeremy A. Greene	Humanities	History of Science, Technology, & Economics
Gabrielle Hecht	Humanities	History of Science, Technology, & Economics
Projit Bihari Mukharji	Humanities	History of Science, Technology, & Economics
Gretchen H. Gerzina	Humanities	Intellectual & Cultural History
Yuri Leving	Humanities	Intellectual & Cultural History
Scott L. Cummings	Social Sciences	Law
Mary Ziegler	Social Sciences	Law
Bonnie Honig	Humanities	Literary Criticism
Heather Love	Humanities	Literary Criticism
Michael Rothberg	Humanities	Literary Criticism
Lillian B. Pierce	Natural Sciences	Mathematics
Euan Angus Ashley	Natural Sciences	Medicine & Health
Ezekiel J. Emanuel	Natural Sciences	Medicine & Health
Lisa Bielawa	Creative Arts	Music Composition
Keith Fitch	Creative Arts	Music Composition
Kokayi	Creative Arts	Music Composition
Pascal Le Boeuf	Creative Arts	Music Composition
Eun Young Lee	Creative Arts	Music Composition
Nicole M. Mitchell	Creative Arts	Music Composition
Dafna Naphtali	Creative Arts	Music Composition
João Pedro Oliveira	Creative Arts	Music Composition
Timothy Page	Creative Arts	Music Composition
Donald Vega	Creative Arts	Music Composition
Shana L. Redmond	Humanities	Music Research
Orit Bashkin	Humanities	Near Eastern Studies
Stephen Darwall	Humanities	Philosophy
Jennifer M. Morton	Humanities	Philosophy
Susanna Siegel	Humanities	Philosophy
Tony Chirinos	Creative Arts	Photography
Deanna Dikeman	Creative Arts	Photography
Curran Hatleberg	Creative Arts	Photography
Pao Houa Her	Creative Arts	Photography
Laura Larson	Creative Arts	Photography
Klea McKenna	Creative Arts	Photography
Mark McKnight	Creative Arts	Photography
Edward Morris	Creative Arts	Photography
Rebecca Moseman	Creative Arts	Photography
Sasha Phyars-Burgess	Creative Arts	Photography
Shane Rocheleau	Creative Arts	Photography
Aaron Rothman	Creative Arts	Photography
Susannah Sayler	Creative Arts	Photography
Christina Seely	Creative Arts	Photography
Jerry Spagnoli	Creative Arts	Photography
Marita Sturken	Humanities	Photography Studies
Prineha Narang	Natural Sciences	Physics
Hirosi Ooguri	Natural Sciences	Physics
Christopher Walter	Natural Sciences	Physics
Nicky Beer	Creative Arts	Poetry
Brian Komei Dempster	Creative Arts	Poetry
Kathy Fagan	Creative Arts	Poetry
Wayne Koestenbaum	Creative Arts	Poetry
Shara McCallum	Creative Arts	Poetry
Roger Reeves	Creative Arts	Poetry
Atsuro Riley	Creative Arts	Poetry
Karen Solie	Creative Arts	Poetry
Frank R. Baumgartner	Social Sciences	Political Science
William Howell	Social Sciences	Political Science
Tali Mendelberg	Social Sciences	Political Science
Eduardo Mercado III	Social Sciences	Psychology
Jennifer Graber	Humanities	Religion
Jiang Wu	Humanities	Religion
Jason Fletcher	Social Sciences	Sociology
Leela Prasad	Humanities	South & Southeast Asian Studies
Patrick Anderson	Humanities	Theatre Arts & Performance Studies
Soyica Diggs Colbert	Humanities	Theatre Arts & Performance Studies
Petra Kuppers	Humanities	Theatre Arts & Performance Studies
Michael Berry	Humanities	Translation
Edward Ball	Humanities	U.S. History
Amanda Cobb-Greetham	Humanities	U.S. History
Mabel O. Wilson	Humanities	U.S. History
