= Housing crisis in the United States =

Housing shortage and inflation

Median cost of rent for a one-bedroom apartment by county

For decades, the United States has faced a growing shortage of housing. The scope and effect of the housing crisis depends on the affected region or segment of the population. The housing shortage has been cited as a major factor in inflation in the US. Artificial scarcity in the supply of housing, due to NIMBYism, has been a significant factor in making housing more expensive. Freddie Mac estimated that the shortage of homes increased by 52%, to 3.8 million units, between 2018 and 2020.

== History ==
Cartogram showing number of residents per bedroom across the US

Housing prices and rents fluctuate over time, but historical data indicates that real rents and real housing prices have substantially increased from 1890 to 2006. Real housing prices have nearly quadrupled while rents have increased by 60%. Key contributing factors include burdensome land use and zoning regulations, which have artificially constrained housing supply.

Decades of under-building in economically prosperous metropolitan areas has led to regional housing shortages with national implications. In the 19th century, housing development in the United States was characterized by rapid urban growth in economically productive places. Throughout the 20th century, however, a number of regulations that were designed to block in-fill and direct greenfield development took hold, such as exclusionary zoning. These regulations had the net effect of reducing housing construction and reducing the ability of regional housing stock to adjust to changing market conditions. Beginning in the last quarter of the 20th century, market-wide housing shortages have existed in a growing number of markets throughout the country, starting in prosperous coastal regions, such as Boston, New York, or the San Francisco Bay Area. In the last two decades, these shortages have spread from coastal superstar cities to affect broader areas of the country, so that on average there is a deficit of housing nationwide. Rental vacancy rates, for example, which are one marker of the balance of housing supply, have declined across the country. While, in a balanced market, rental vacancy rates should fall between 7 and 8 percent, only one US census region, the South, achieved target levels on average in its metro areas as of 2021.

These regional housing shortages have had nationwide effects. Rates of migration within the United States have fallen, housing costs have risen in areas that would otherwise provide quality jobs, and incomes from region to region have increasingly diverged. Immigration into the United States in certain markets could account for a minuscule amount of inflated housing costs while some economists believe that deportations would exacerbate the crisis given the high percentage of foreign-born workers building and fixing homes, with a professor at Wharton arguing there is no way to increase the supply without more immigration. Others point out that recent immigrants demand less space, often doubling-up. Immigrants are also more likely to seek out and be recruited to help revitalize places with flagging downtowns and empty homes.

Within areas experiencing these shortages, effects are especially acute among the young, the poor, among renters, those living in crowded conditions, and those experiencing homelessness. Areas with market-wide housing shortages have significantly higher rates of homelessness than those with adequate or surplus housing stock: variations in rent-levels and vacancies are chief factors explaining regional variations in homelessness rates.

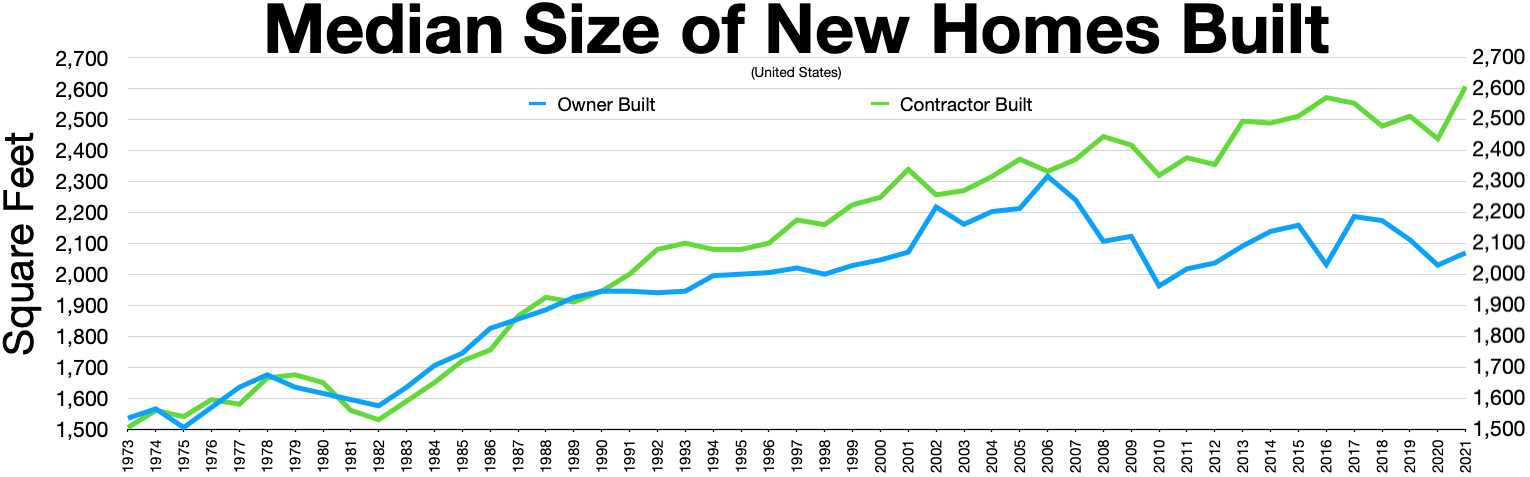
Median size of a new single-family home built in the United States, 1973–2021, according to census data. Zoning restrictions have contributed to this trend in a process called "McMansionization". Contractor built single-family homes Owner built single-family homes

In certain high-demand metros, single-family zoning has also contributed to the process of "McMansionization". Rather than preserving existing single-family homes, single-family zoning can lead to replacement and upscaling because of cost pressures associated with the housing shortage. A trend towards larger single-family homes is also observable in national census data.

After the COVID-19 pandemic, some baby boomers whose children have moved away have found it prohibitively expensive to move into smaller homes, a paradox caused by the higher prices of newer homes, tax benefits given to long-time owners, higher interest rates, and low supply of appropriately-sized housing caused by restrictive zoning that prohibits accessory dwelling units or requires single-family homes. As of 2024, this shortage is estimated to be between 4 and 7 million homes, resulting in rents rising 30% since 2017.

The 2026 State of the Nation's Housing Report by the Harvard Joint Center for Housing Studies determined that the United States housing market is characterized by a severe structural imbalance, featuring a surplus of luxury developments alongside a critical 7.2 million-unit deficit in affordable housing for low- and middle-income households. High construction costs and interest rates have stopped affordable development, pushing the fastest-rising cost burdens onto middle-class families and slowing household formation to the lowest levels since 2017.

== Cost burden ==
Cartogram showing the housing-cost burdened share of the population across the US

The United States Department of Housing and Urban Development (HUD) defines affordable housing as "housing on which the occupant is paying no more than 30 percent of gross income for housing costs, including utilities". HUD uses the terms "cost burdened" and "severely cost burdened" to describe individuals or families that spend more than 30% and 50% of their income on housing costs, respectively. According to the 2020 US census, 46% of American renters are cost burdened, with 23% severely cost burdened. The affordable housing gap especially impacts the lower-income households in America. A 2017 HUD survey found that 89% of extremely low income renter households were moderately or severely cost burdened. 83% of very low income households, 54% of low income households, 20% of moderate income households, and 6% of high income households met the same criteria.

The US Census Bureau found that if you took out housing costs, inflation at the end of 2023 would have been 1.8% instead of 3.2%.

== Affordable and supportive housing ==
In addition to market-wide housing shortages in certain regions of the United States, the term "housing crisis" has been used to describe persistent shortages of non-commodity and supportive housing provided to vulnerable members of the population. Even in regions with relatively abundant market-rate housing, the market can fail to supply safe and sufficient housing to populations with very low income or disabilities that impair independent living. Insufficient public funding has contributed to a distinct housing crisis affecting these groups. Even regions with relatively abundant housing supply and low rates of homelessness, such as Mississippi, face challenges with street homelessness due to factors like addiction, as well as issues with housing quality.

The affordable housing gap is a socio-economic phenomenon characterized by the scarcity of affordable housing relative to the demand for it. This disparity is linked to social, racial, and economic inequality, and disproportionately affects households with lower incomes. The insufficiency of suitable affordable housing options can lead to negative outcomes for both families and communities, including homelessness.

== Discrimination and evictions ==
In addition to shortage and affordability issues, the term "housing crisis" has been used for overlapping concepts such as a "fair housing crisis", involving residential discrimination and effects of segregation; an "eviction crisis"; issues of gentrification and displacement; and environmental concerns. Eviction, displacement, and forms of housing inequality are worsened by and related to the shortage and affordability crisis, but also have causes of their own and require distinct solutions. Some states and cities have begun passing just cause eviction laws to protect tenants from eviction.

== Health outcomes linked to eviction and overcrowding ==
In the United States, housing insecurity has been linked with a range of negative health outcomes. The medical journal, JAMA Pediatrics, published a 2021 study examining 5 million birth records in Georgia. The outcome found that eviction notices given during pregnancy were linked to higher preterm and low birth weight rates. These health problems are still present even after regarding the parent's age, income, living situation, and education. On average, researchers found that these actions happened especially in the second or third trimester. Birth weight lowered by about 26.88 grams, and pregnancies declined by 0.09 weeks. Low birth weight increased by a rate of 0.88 percentage points, and premature birth increased by a rate of 1.14 percentage points. The connection between housing instability and infant health shows how health problems can be passed down, especially during the second and third trimesters, a key time for fetal growth.

Overcrowded housing conditions have also been linked to worse health outcomes. In 2022, the International Journal of Environmental Research of Public Health conducted a systematic review that examines the health impacts of such conditions. It found that crowded living spaces were linked with hazardous environmental conditions that point to key health outcomes. This included the presence and growth of mold, lack of ventilation, the occurrence of pests, and harsh indoor temperatures. These conditions and risks are attributed to respiratory diseases and chronic conditions among the vulnerable population. Additionally, the Centers for Disease Control and Prevention (CDC) identified overcrowding as a public health concern, as it increases the transmission of infectious respiratory diseases, including COVID-19. Their observational study analyzed US hotspot counties. Hotspot counties are counties reported with 100 or more new active COVID-19 cases in the past week. According to the study analyzing data from April to July 2020, counties with more crowded housing were 2.0 times more likely to contract COVID-19 and become hotspots. Even after recognizing socially vulnerable factors, the study reports a 95% confidence interval ranging from 1.8 to 2.3.

== Rent algorithm ==
ProPublica in 2022 investigated the use of RealPage's algorithmic pricing scheme by many competing rental companies across the United States to set rental prices, which critics allege has helped to raise rents by limiting competition. The US DOJ escalated its investigation into price fixing in March 2024, and filed an anti-trust lawsuit in August 2024.

== Data ==
U.S. Annual Homeownership Rate (2010–2026). View chart definition.

== See also ==
- California housing shortage
- New York City housing shortage
- New York City migrant housing crisis
- Oregon housing shortage
- United States affordability crisis
