= Dalton Conley =

American sociologist (born 1969)

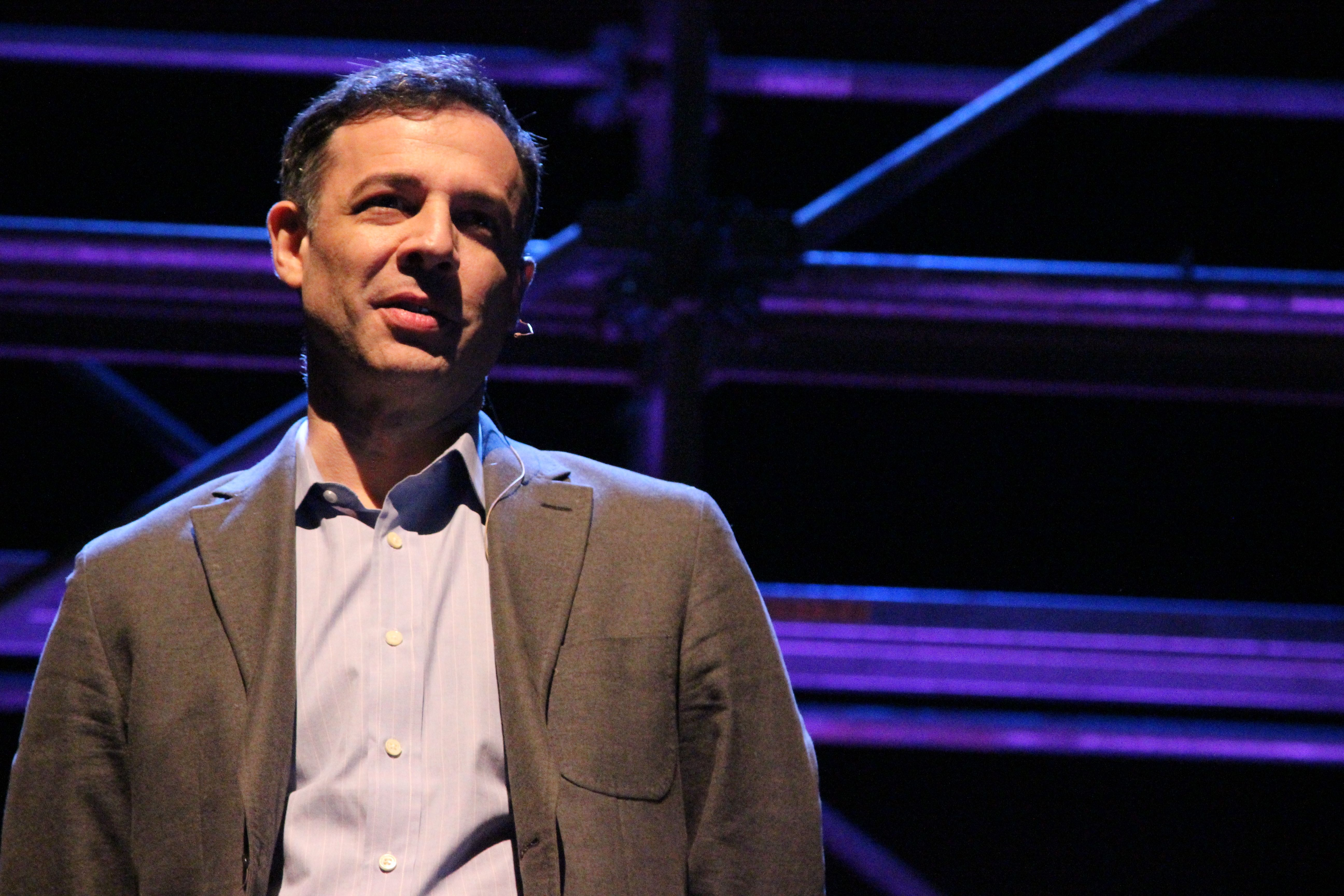
- Conley in 2015
- Born: Dalton Clark Conley; 1969 (age 56–57)
- Education: University of California, Berkeley (BA); Columbia University (MPA, PhD); New York University (MS, PhD)

Dalton Clark Conley (born 1969) is an American sociologist. He is a professor at Princeton University and has several books, including a memoir and a sociology textbook.

== Education ==
Conley attended Stuyvesant High School. He graduated from the University of California, Berkeley with a BA in humanities and from Columbia University with an MPA in public policy and a PhD in sociology. He also holds an MS and PhD in biology (genomics) from NYU.

== Career ==
Conley is best known for his contributions to understanding how health and socioeconomic status are transmitted across generations. His first book, Being Black, Living in the Red (1999), focuses on the role of family wealth in perpetuating class advantages and racial inequalities in the post-civil rights era.

His second book, the memoir Honky (2000), examines Conley's childhood growing up White in an inner-city neighborhood of housing projects in New York City.

Conley has studied the role of health in the status-attainment process. An article, "Is Biology Destiny: Birth Weight and Life Chances" (with Neil G. Bennett, American Sociological Review, 1999), and his third book, The Starting Gate: Birth Weight and Life Chances (with Kate Strully and Neil G. Bennett, 2003), addressed the importance of birth weight and prenatal health to later socioeconomic outcomes. Conley's next book, The Pecking Order, which followed in 2004, argued for the importance of within-family factors in determining sibling differences in socioeconomic success.

In 2008, Conley published the introductory sociology textbook You May Ask Yourself, which is set to be reissued in its eighth edition in late 2026.

His subsequent book, Elsewhere, U.S.A., published in 2009, describes changes in American work–life attitudes and social ethics in the information economy. In 2014, he published the satirical book Parentology: Everything You Wanted to Know About the Science of Raising Children but Were Too Exhausted to Ask, using his own parenting decisions as examples. Conley gave his children unusual names for sociological reasons: he has a daughter named E and a son named Yo Xing Heyno Augustus Eisner Alexander Weiser Knuckles Jeremijenko-Conley.

In 2017, Conley published The Genome Factor, co-authored with Jason Fletcher. This book discusses the nature versus nurture debate and the influence of genes on social life.

In 2025, he published The Social Genome: The New Science of Nature and Nurture.

Conley is the Henry Putnam University Professor of Sociology at Princeton University.

== Recognition ==
- CAREER Award, National Science Foundation (2001).
- Alan T. Waterman Award, National Science Foundation (2005).
- Elected to the Council on Foreign Relations (2007).
- Guggenheim Fellow (2011).
- Otis Dudley Duncan Award, American Sociological Association (2018).

== Personal life ==
Conley is married to the Bosnian-American astrophysicist Tea Temim, with whom he has a child. He also has two children from a previous marriage, to Natalie Jeremijenko.

== Works ==
- Being Black, Living in the Red. University of California Press. 1999. ISBN 978-0-520-21673-0.
- Honky. University of California Press. 2000. ISBN 0-520-21586-9.
- The Starting Gate. University of California Press. 2003. ISBN 978-0-520-23955-5.
- The Pecking Order. Random House. 2004. ISBN 978-0-375-71381-1.
- You May Ask Yourself. W. W. Norton & Company. 2008. ISBN 978-0-393-12020-2.
- Elsewhere, U.S.A. Random House. 2009. ISBN 978-0-375-42290-4.
- Parentology. Simon & Schuster. 2014. ISBN 978-1-476-71266-6.
- The Genome Factor. Princeton University Press. 2017. ISBN 978-0-691-16474-8., with Jason Fletcher
- The Social Genome. W. W. Norton & Company. 2025. ISBN 978-1324092636.
