= Oregon House Bill 2001 (2019) =

2019 housing legislation in the state of Oregon, U.S.

Oregon State Legislature
- Full name: Relating to housing; creating new provisions; amending ORS 197.296, 197.303, 197.312 and 455.610 and section 1, chapter 47, Oregon Laws 2018; and declaring an emergency.
- Introduced: January 14, 2019
- House voted: June 20, 2019
- Senate voted: June 30, 2019
- Signed into law: August 14, 2019
- Governor: Kate Brown

Status: Current legislation

Oregon House Bill 2001 (HB 2001) is an Oregon law which allows for alternative, more economical types of housing in an effort to preserve outer-city rural areas, such as farms. The law is especially aimed at reducing the pace of urban sprawl in densely populated cities such as Portland, Oregon, with non-traditional land use zoning.

== Content ==
On July 2, 2019, the state of Oregon passed House Bill 2001 which provides an alternative to only single-family zoning. The law is an example of inclusionary zoning and allows for more affordable housing to be built. The bill allows duplexes, triplexes, fourplexes, and cottage clusters (which are several smaller homes built around a community backyard or other green space) to be built on land zoned for single-family homes in cities with over 25,000 residents. In cities with over 10,000 residents, duplexes will be allowed on land zoned for single-family homes. Approximately 2.8 million people of Oregon’s 4.1 million population live in areas affected by this bill. The bill was signed into law by Governor Kate Brown on August 8, 2019 and took effect in 2020.

=== Background ===
Oregon has often been seen as a leader in non-traditional land use, as they have had a statewide urban growth boundary since 1973. While urban growth boundaries, and Portland's in particular, have become more controversial lately, the idea is to prevent urban sprawl from growing into farmland directly outside of the city. Housing has become increasingly unaffordable in Portland and other US cities, and HB 2001 is one way that Oregon is attempting to combat that.

The law is similar to the Minneapolis housing policy that legalizes small multifamily homes in residential parts of the city. A similar plan has been adopted in certain neighborhoods in Seattle. Oregon's bill is the first of its type to be implemented at a state rather than local level. The bill passed through the house fairly quickly and easily. The bill’s main sponsor, then-speaker Tina Kotek, defended the bill's emphasis on choice and providing more affordable alternatives.

=== Criticism ===
The bill received criticism from both the right and the left. From the right, opponents of the bill argued that the state should expand or get rid of the urban growth boundary to combat the rising cost of housing rather than implement HB 2001. From the left, affordability advocates argued that the bill was insufficient and would not address the crisis in the short-term.

== Proposed amendments ==
=== HB 2138 (2025) ===
In January 2025, Kotek, who was elected governor in 2022, announced her proposal for House Bill 2138, which would amend the applicability of HB 2011. Among its provisions:

- expanding allowed middle housing requirements to include urban unincorporated land;
- retroactively prohibiting private restrictions against middle housing, accessory dwelling units, or housing density enacted prior to passage of HB 2001;
- limiting local governments' ability to reduce density requirements within the urban growth boundary; and
- expanding single room occupancies.

== See also ==
- California HOME Act – similar legislation
- Oregon housing shortage
- YIMBY – pro-housing movement
