= Bitrán =

Bitrán is a surname. Notable people with the surname include:

- Claudia Bitrán (born 1986), Chilean painter, video artist, and educator
- Eduardo Bitrán (born 1957), Chilean civil engineer and politician
- Yael Bitrán (born 1965), Chilean-born Mexican historian, translator, and musicologist

== See also ==
- Albert Bitran (1931–2018), French painter, engraver and sculptor
