= Mark Christian Thompson =

American academic (b.1970)

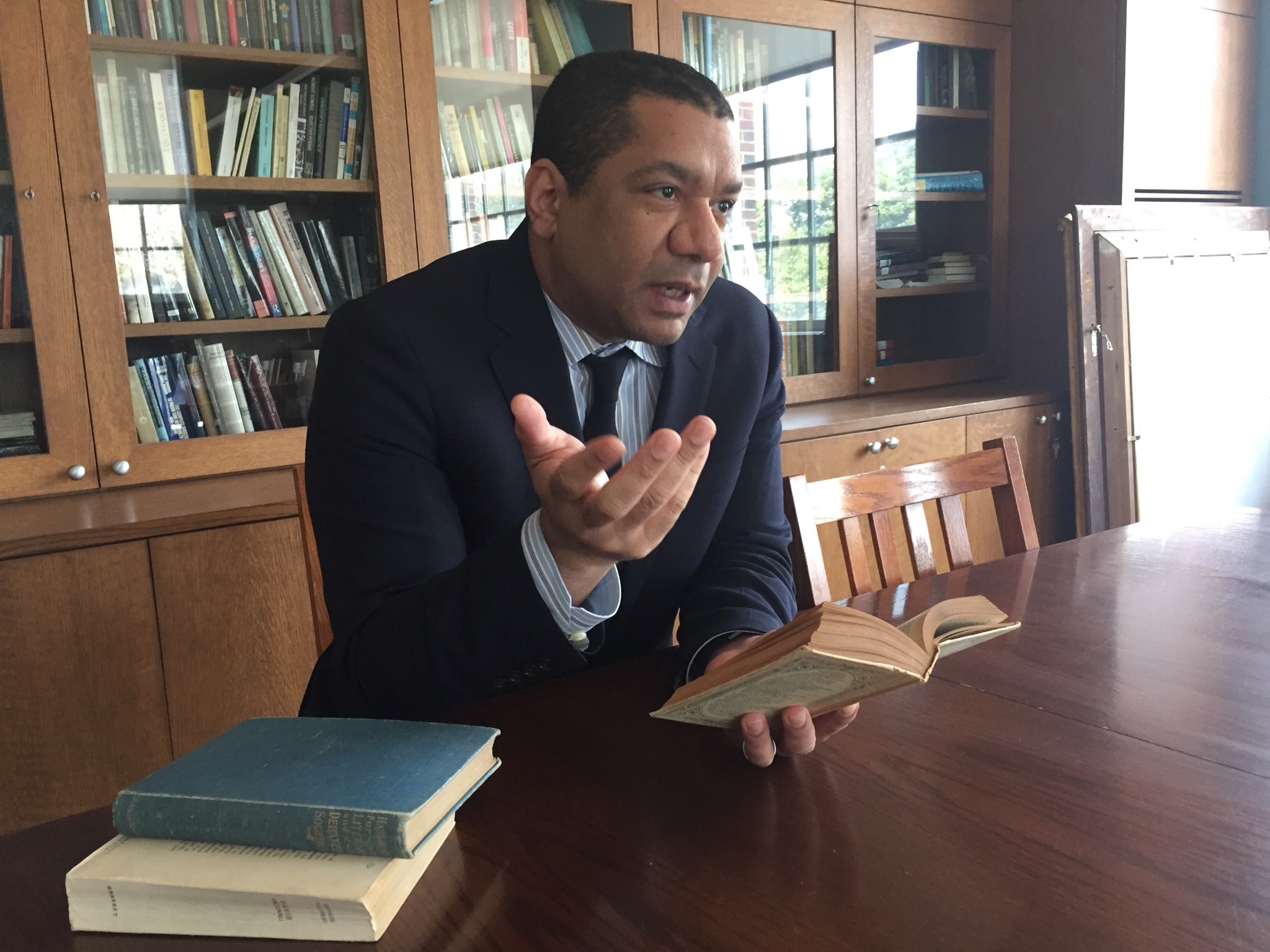
- Mark Christian Thompson lecturing in Baltimore, 2017
- Title: Professor of English

Mark Christian Thompson (born c. 1970) is an American academic who is Krieger-Eisenhower Professor and Professor of English at Johns Hopkins University in Baltimore, Maryland. His research focuses on African American literature and philosophy, as well as German philosophy and jazz studies.

== Early life and education ==
Thompson was born in New York City and speaks fluent German and French. He is the son of an African American father and a mother immigrated from Sicily. He studied art history as an undergraduate at the University of Virginia, graduating in 1993. He then completed both a Masters and a PhD in comparative literature at New York University, with a 2001 thesis titled Savage Modernism: Blood-sacrifice, Literary Primitivism and Culture.

== Career ==
Thompson was an Assistant Professor of English at the University of Illinois, Urbana-Champaign from 2001 to 2009. In 2007, he was awarded a Fulbright Scholar grant to lecture at Charles University in Prague on "the aesthetics of blackness".

Thompson started at Johns Hopkins University in 2010 as an Associate Professor English and was made Professor in 2016 and chair of the department in 2018. At Johns Hopkins, Thompson teaches courses including "The Philosophy of African American Literature; African American Literary Theory and Criticism"; "Modernism and Sacrifice; The Body, Space, and Modernity in Nineteenth-Century Fiction"; "African American Literature: The Beginnings to 1914"; "Slave Narratives and Neo-Slave Narratives"; "The Gothic Novel"; "The Bible as Literature"; and "Introduction to Literary Study".

Thompson's first book, Black Fascisms: African American Literature and Culture Between the Wars, was published in 2007, and addresses the fact that many African American intellectuals in the 1930s sympathized with fascism. Thompson argues these tendencies were more than merely a response to events in Germany and Italy but an "organise feature of the evolution of blackness." His 2016 book, Kafka’s Blues: Figurations of Racial Blackness in the Construction of an Aesthetic, deconstructs Kafka through the lens of race and argues that many of his major works engage in a "coherent, sustained meditation on racial blackness",

In 2018, Thompson published Anti-Music: Jazz and Racial Blackness in German Thought between the Wars, examining writings by Hermann Hesse, Bertolt Brecht, T.W. Adorno, and Klaus Mann, to look at the topic of jazz in the Weimar Republic and Nazi Germany using a "symptomatic textual reading" to examine attitudes.

Thompson's 2022 book, Black Power, Philosophy, and Theory "examines the changing interdisciplinary investments of key mid-century Black writers and thinkers" and places Black Power in a philosophical context.

Thompson has commented in the media on the Trump administration, the meaning of United States legal institutions such as the filibuster and the Electoral College, as well as police reform and racial profiling.

== Selected publications ==
=== Books ===
- Thompson, Mark Christian (2007). Black Fascisms: African American Literature and Culture Between the Wars. University of Virginia Press. ISBN 9780813926711.
- Thompson, Mark Christian (2016). Kafka's Blues: Figurations of Racial Blackness in the Construction of an Aesthetic. Northwestern University Press. ISBN 9780810132856.
- Thompson, Mark Christian (2018). Anti-Music: Jazz and Racial Blackness in German Thought between the Wars. SUNY Press. ISBN 9781438469874.
- Thompson, Mark Christian (2022). Phenomenal Blackness: Black Power, Philosophy, and Theory. University of Chicago Press. ISBN 9780226816425.
- Thompson, Mark Christian (2022). The Critique of Nonviolence: Martin Luther King, Jr., and Philosophy. Stanford University Press. ISBN 9781503632073.

=== Chapters and articles ===
- Thompson, Mark Christian (2004). "National Socialism and Blood-Sacrifice in Zora Neale Hurston's "Moses, Man of the Mountain"". African American Review. 38 (3). Johns Hopkins University Press: 395–415. doi:10.2307/1512442. JSTOR 1512442.
- Thompson, Mark Christian (2005). "Voodoo Fascism: Fascist Ideology in Arna Bontemps's Drums at Dusk". MELUS. 30 (3). Oxford University Press: 155–177. doi:10.1093/melus/30.3.155. JSTOR 30029777.
- Thompson, Mark Christian (2010). "Aesthetic Hygiene: Marcus Garvey, W.E.B. Du Bois, and the Work of Art". In Gene Andrew Jarrett (ed.). A Companion to African American Literature. John Wiley & Sons. pp. 243–253. ISBN 9781405188623.
- Thompson, Mark Christian (2013). "Review: What Will Be African-American Literature?". American Literary History. 25 (4). Oxford University Press: 958–966. doi:10.1093/alh/ajt048. JSTOR 43817611.
- Thompson, Mark Christian (2015). "The Negro who Disappeared: Race in Kafka's Amerika". In Stefani Engelstein; Carl Niekerk (eds.). Contemplating Violence: Critical Studies in Modern German Culture. Rodopi. pp. 183–198. ISBN 978-9042032958.
