= United States affordability crisis =

Ongoing cost-of-living crisis in the US

The United States affordability crisis is an ongoing cost-of-living crisis in the US characterized by stagnant wages, high inflation, rising bills, and high interest rates. The crisis began after inflation spiked in 2021, although some elements, such as low wage growth, have been a longstanding trend.

== Causes ==
The consumer price index (CPI) began increasing in the months following the April 2025 announcement of tariffs.

Stagnant wages are often considered a long-term cause of the affordability crisis. Although real wages have increased since the early 1980s, they have not grown at the same rate as overall economic productivity. According to the Brookings Institution, reduced union activity and collective bargaining, which has declined since the 1980s, is a big factor in the lack of wage growth.

The global 2021–2023 inflation surge increased the price of necessities in the United States. To lower inflation, the Federal Reserve raised interest rates, increasing the cost of car loans, home loans, and other consumer debt. Greatly expanded tariffs in the second Trump administration are widely considered to have continued the inflation crisis in the United States.

The retail price of gasoline in the US increased at the outbreak of war in Iran. In late April 2026, Trump said Americans should expect higher gas prices for "a little while".

The retail price of diesel fuel in the US increased at the outbreak of war in Iran.

While some communities near AI data centers experience much higher electricity prices, reports from various economic and energy research groups have found that there is no correlation between AI data centers and increased electricity prices, and in some cases data centers cause decreased electricity prices. The 2026 Iran war caused a sharp increase in gas prices nationally in the United States.

== Rising costs ==
=== Food ===
A 2024 survey found that 70% of Americans struggled with the cost of groceries. Three out of four said they had cut back on other expenses to afford food, particularly movies and concerts.

=== Childcare ===
The cost of childcare rose 30% between 2020 and 2024 with a yearly average of $13,000 per child.

=== Housing and utilities ===
The cost of utilities has risen significantly in the 2020s. Between 2020 and 2025, electricity bills rose 40%. Rising interest rates and low home construction following the Great Recession have caused mortgage and rent prices to rise significantly.

== Effects ==
Down payments on new cars have shrunk by $600 between 2024 and 2025. Consumers increasingly relied on longer terms to lower monthly payments. In March 2026, a majority of car dealerships said the economy was lowering new car sales. 74% of Americans said a new car is unaffordable. According to the June Fed Beige Book, used car sales have increased, showing a shift from new car purchases to used vehicles.

== Responses ==
=== Government ===
The 21st Century ROAD to Housing Act, designed to address the housing affordability crisis in the United States, passed the Senate and House in March and May 2026. New York City passed a universal childcare program in 2026 to combat rising costs.

=== Political ===
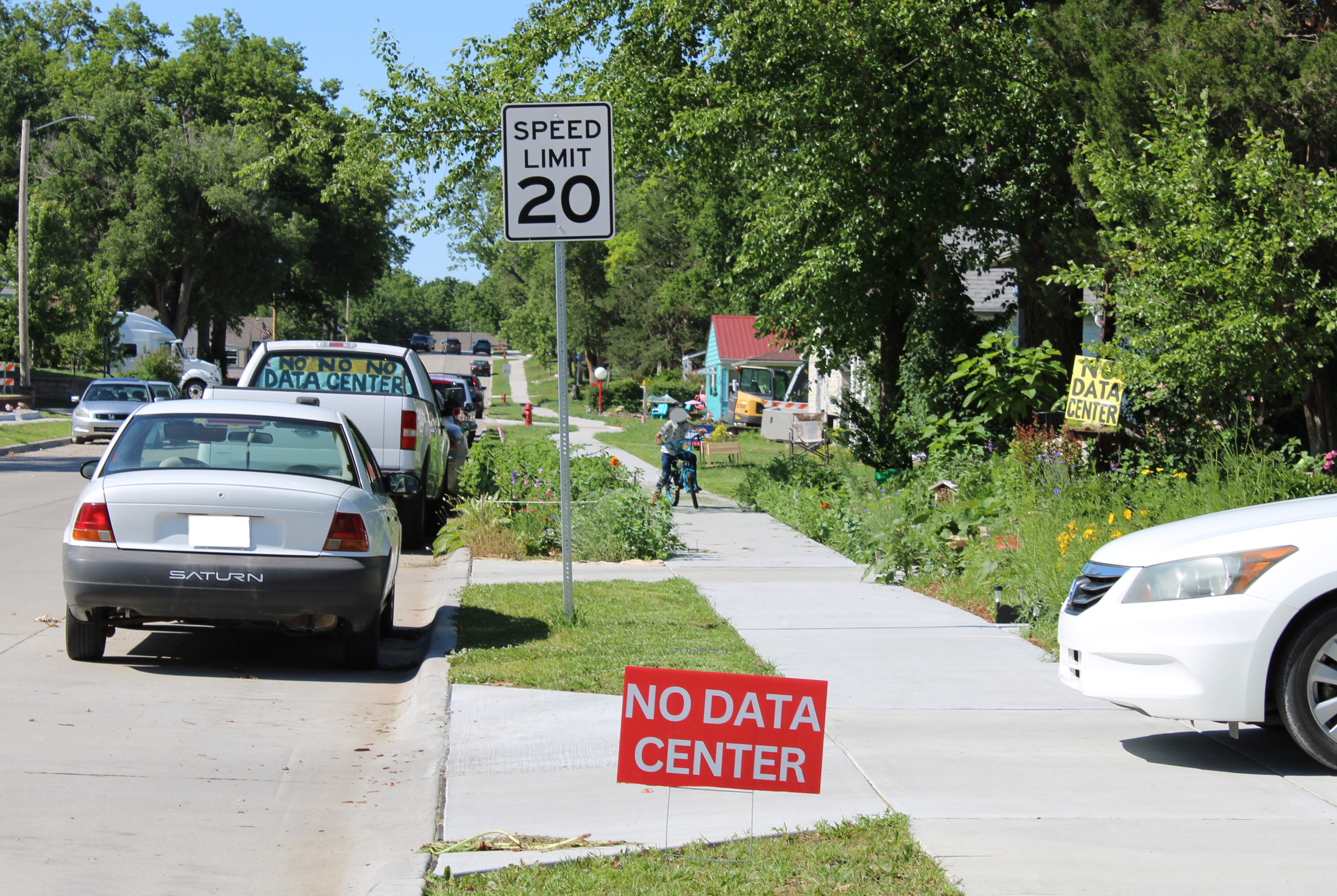
Anti-data-center sentiment in a rural Kansas neighborhood

Affordability was a key part of Donald Trump's 2024 presidential campaign. Trump listed "make America affordable again" as one of his 20 core promises of the campaign on his website, particularly in regard to lowering inflation. As the Republican vice-presidential nominee, JD Vance argued that the housing aspect of the affordability crisis was due to immigrants "[competing] with Americans for scarce homes." Following Zohran Mamdani's Democratic primary win in the 2025 New York mayoral election, Democrats have focused on an "affordability message". The affordability crisis was a prominent topic in the 2025 United States elections, especially in Virginia and New Jersey. In December 2025, President Trump called the affordability crisis a "hoax".

Some American politicians have responded to the backlash to AI data centers by calling for a pause on data center development in order to find a way to address electricity affordability concerns. House representatives Delia Ramirez and Analilia Mejia introduced the Living Wage for All Act to increase the federal minimum wage, which has been stagnant since 2009. The $25 minimum wage was calculated using the MIT living wage calculator. Many states have approved citizen-led ballot initiatives to raise the minimum wage in the 2020s during the affordability crisis. The raises have been intended to combat inflation.

== See also ==
- Income inequality in the United States
- K-shaped recession
- United Kingdom cost-of-living crisis
- Vibecession
