= Evita Tezeno =

- Born: 9 May 1960 (age 66); Port Arthur, Texas, US
- Education: Lamar University
- Known for: Collage art, visual art
- Awards: Guggenheim Fellowship

Evita Tezeno (born May 9, 1960) is an American artist currently based in Dallas, Texas. She works in collage art, employing patterned hand-painted papers and found objects. Tezeno's work is influenced by modernists including Romare Bearden, and is characterized by depictions of scenes from her life, family, and childhood memories in South Texas. Her work aims to present a cohesive portrayal of Black America, drawing inspiration from artists such as Elizabeth Catlett and William H. Johnson. In 2012, she was awarded the Elizabeth Catlett Printmaking Award.

Tezeno received a Guggenheim Fellowship in 2023, in recognition of her contributions to the fine arts. Her artworks are featured in the African American Museum of Dallas, Dallas Museum of Fine Arts and the Embassy of the Republic of Madagascar, and her works have been acquired by Samuel L. Jackson, Denzel Washington, Star Jones, Laurie David, Esther Silver-Parker, David Hoberman and Susan Taylor. According to Vogue magazine, "her uplifting work has lately been gaining attention in the art crowd, both regionally and across the country."

Tezeno designed the Congo Square poster for the New Orleans Jazz & Heritage Festival in 1999, making her the first female artist to undertake this task. Her group exhibitions have included "Phenomenal Women #UsToo" (2019) at the African American Museum, Dallas.

== Early life ==
Tezeno is a native of Port Arthur, Texas. After completing her primary education, she pursued a Bachelor of Science degree in Graphic Design at Lamar University in Beaumont, Texas, graduating in 1984.

== Artistry ==
Tezeno works in collage paintings that integrate patterned hand-painted papers and found objects. Each piece is a visual symphony, weaving together threads of personal narrative and broader societal themes. Her sources of inspiration include familial ties and childhood memories in South Texas, and the influence of 20th-century modernists like Romare Bearden, Elizabeth Catlett, and William H. Johnson. She incorporates vintage buttons inherited from her grandmother in most of her pieces.

Tezeno was awarded a Guggenheim Fellowship for fine arts and the Elizabeth Catlett Award for "The New Power Generation". Her work has been exhibited in the African American Museum of Dallas, the Embassy of the Republic of Madagascar, the Pizzuti Collection in Columbus, Ohio, the Bill and Christy Gautreaux Collection in Kansas City, Missouri, and the Beth Rudin DeWoody Collection in Palm Beach, Florida. She has been commissioned for the Essence Music Festival in New Orleans, The Deep Ellum Film Festival in Dallas, and the New Orleans Jazz & Heritage Festival ("Jazz Fest"), where she was the first female artist to design its Congo Square poster in 1999.

== Exhibitions ==
Her solo exhibitions have included "Better Days" (2021) at Luis De Jesus Los Angeles, "Memories Create Our Yesterdays and Tomorrows" (2019) at Thelma Harris Gallery, "Thoughts of Time Gone By" (2017) at the Peg Alston Gallery, "The Moments We Share Are the Memories We Keep" (2023) at Luis De Jesus Los Angeles in Los Angeles, California and “Out of Many” (2023) at Houston Museum of African American Culture in Houston, Texas, "My Life, My Story" at Luis De Jesus Los Angeles,

"Sharing Memories" (2021) was a two-person exhibition with Jas Mardis at the ArtCentre of Plano in Plano, Texas. She also participated in "Thoughts of Time Gone By" (2017) at the Peg Alston Gallery in New York City, and "Memories from Yesterday" (2014) at the same venue, "Phenomenal Women #UsTo" (2019) at the African American Museum in Dallas, Texas, and "Daughter of Diaspora – Women of Color Speak" (2018) at the Hearne Fine Art Gallery in Little Rock, Arkansas.

In 2023, "Talk of the Town: A Dallas Art Museum Pop Up Exhibition" was held at the NorthPark Centre in Dallas, Texas, and "Layer / Build: Contemporary Collage" at the Massachusetts College of Liberal Arts Gallery 51 in North Adams, Massachusetts.

Tezeno's work was included in This Is America: Selections from PAMM's Collection, at the Pérez Art Museum Miami, in 2026.

== Personal life ==
Tezeno adopted a vegan lifestyle in the late 1980s, influenced by her Seventh-day Adventist beliefs. Her dietary shift stirred controversy with her family, accustomed to annual traditions centered around preparation of freshly butchered meats. She said in a 2023 interview, "My family thought I'd lost my mind, that I was gonna just shrivel up and die.". She also hosted a raw-food cooking show in the early 2010s.

== Solo exhibitions ==
- Thoughts of Time Gone By, Peg Alston Gallery, New York, New York (2017)
- Memories That Speak to My Soul, Stella Jones Gallery, New Orleans, Louisiana (2018)
- Memories Create Our Yesterdays and Tomorrows, Thelma Harris Gallery, Oakland, California (2019)
- Sharing Memories, Evita Tezeno and Jas Mardis, ArtCentre of Plano, Plano, Texas (2021)
- Better Days, Luis De Jesus Los Angeles, Los Angeles, California (2021)
- My Life, My Story, Luis De Jesus Los Angeles, Los Angeles, California (2022)
- The Moments We Share, Are the Memories We Keep, Luis De Jesus Los Angeles, Los Angeles, California (2023)
- Out of Many, Houston Museum of African American Culture, Houston, Texas (2023)

== Collections ==
- Pérez Art Museum Miami, Florida
- African American Museum, Dallas, Texas
- Dallas Museum of Art, Dallas, Texas
- Figge Art Museum, Davenport, Iowa
- Embassy of the Republic of Madagascar, Washington D.C.
- Daimler-Chrysler Collection, Auburn Hills, Michigan Nortel Networks, Dallas, Texas
- The Pizzuti Collection, Columbus, Ohio
- Beth Rudin DeWoody Collection, Palm Beach, Florida
- Bill and Christy Gautreaux Collection, Kansas City, Missouri
- Sheryl and Geoff Green, Dallas, Texas
- Samuel L. Jackson, Los Angeles, California
- The Collection of Star Jones, New York, New York
- Arthur Lewis Collection, Los Angeles, California
- Jeff and Marlo Melucci, Dallas, Texas
- Jorge M. Pérez Collection, Miami, Florida
- Denise Rich, New York, New York
- Susan Taylor, Essence Magazine, New York, New York
- Denzel Washington, Los Angeles, California

== Awards ==
- 2012 Elizabeth Catlett Printmaking Award, The New Power Generation, Hampton University, Hampton, Virginia
- 2023 Guggenheim Foundation Fellowship in Fine Arts, John Simon Guggenheim Memorial Foundation, New York, New York
