= Natalie Jeremijenko =

Australian artist (born 1966)

Natalie Jeremijenko AO
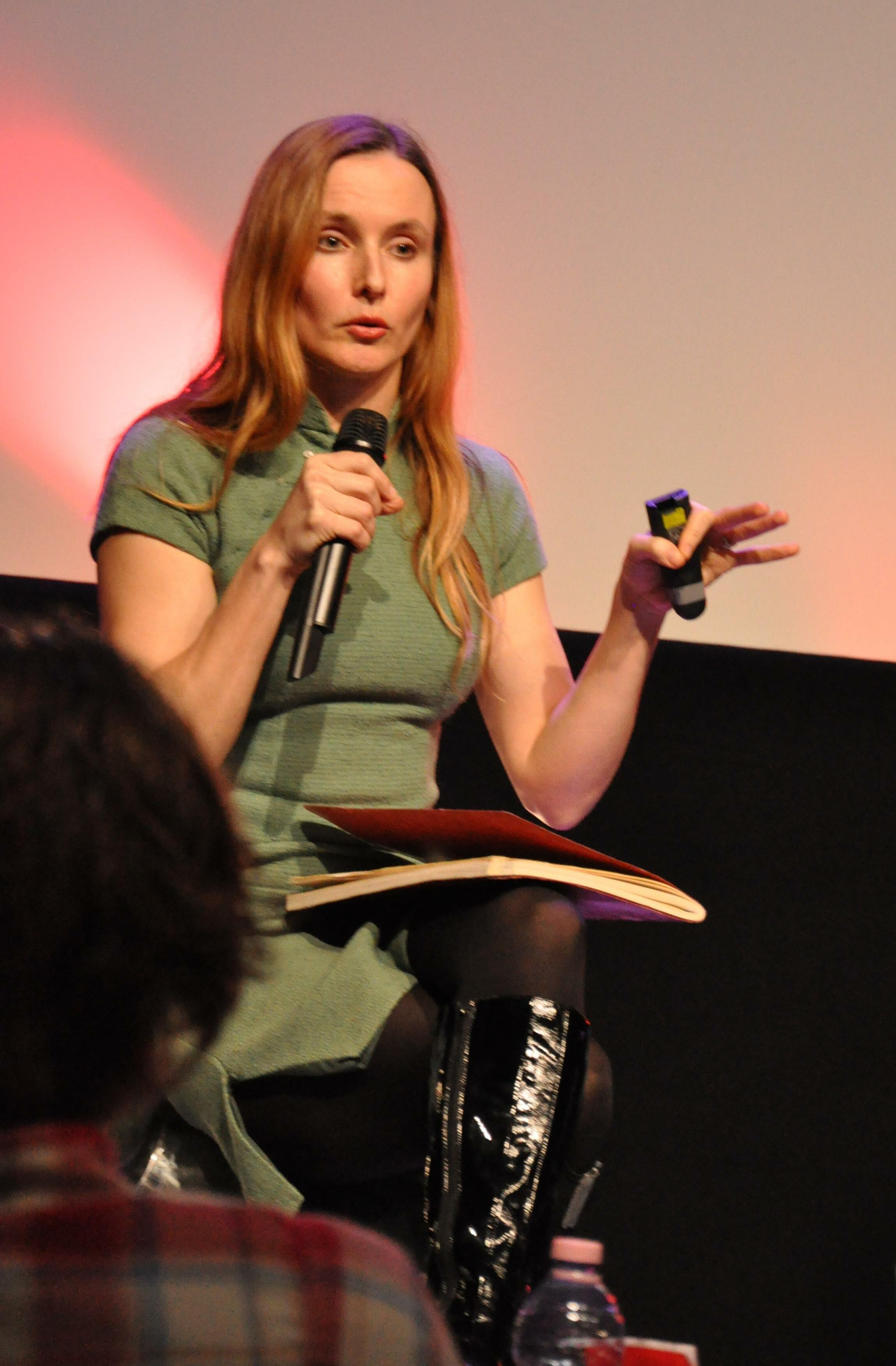
- Natalie Jeremijenko in 2009
- Born: 1966 (age 59–60); Mackay, Queensland, Australia
- Education: Royal Melbourne Institute of Technology; Griffith University
- Style: net.art
- Movement: Experimental design
- Spouse: Dalton Conley (div.)

xDesign Environmental Health Clinic's mobile office

Natalie Jeremijenko AO (born 1966) is an Australian environmental artist and engineer whose background includes studies in biochemistry, physics, neuroscience and precision engineering. She is an active member of the net.art movement, and her work primarily explores the interface between society, the environment and technology. She has alternatively described her work as "X Design" (short for experimental design) and herself as a "thingker", a combination of thing-maker and thinker. She is also described as an "artist-experimenter."

Jeremijenko describes her work as "socio-ecological systems design." As Rachael Rettner summarized, "She uses her engineering skills to set up public art projects that highlight social issues and focus on the relationship between humans and our environment."

== Life and education ==
Jeremijenko was born in Mackay, Queensland, and raised in Brisbane, the second of ten children to a physician and a schoolteacher. Her parents were champions of domestic technology, and Jeremijenko claims that her mother was the first woman in Australia to own a microwave.

She has a PhD in computer science and electrical engineering from the University of Queensland, and additionally did coursework for a PhD in mechanical engineering at Stanford University, without completing the degree.

Year	Degree	University	Details	Notes
1992	BFA (with Honors)	Royal Melbourne Institute of Technology	Digital Information: "Explorations in Scientific Representation Exploiting Surround Sensory Input (Virtual Reality)"	
1993	BS (Conferred)	Griffith University, Queensland, Australia	Neuroscience and biochemistry	

She was previously married to the sociologist Dalton Conley with whom she had two children: E and Yo. Jeremijenko also has a daughter, Jamba, from a previous relationship.

== Career ==
In the 1990s, Jeremijenko worked as an artist-in-residence at Xerox PARC in Palo Alto.

In 2018, she was Artist in Residence at Dartmouth College, and is currently an associate professor at New York University in the Visual Art Department and has affiliated faculty appointments in the school's Computer Science and Environmental Studies.

== Works ==
Jeremijenko created and published art under the Bureau of Inverse Technology (BIT). This group of anonymous artists started in the early 1990s and worked in both art and technology. BIT is based in Melbourne, Australia; San Francisco, California; and Berlin, Germany.

=== Film and speeches ===
==== Suicide Box, 1997 ====
Suicide Box consists of motion sensor cameras, placed on the Golden Gate Bridge for an initial 100 day period. The name is a reference to the location, the Golden Gate Bridge ranking amongst the most popular suicide spots in the United States. Cameras were installed without permission from local municipal authorities. Data recorded by the footage, vertical motions assumed to be suicides, came out to an average of .68 suicides per day over the duration of the project. Footage was later compared against information about fluctuations in the Dow Jones Industrial Average, the average being popularly held as an indicator of the economy's health. A commonly held conception is that suicides increase during times of economic downturn, though the comparison of data from "Suicide Box" when compared to DOW fluctuations indicated no correlations.

Controversies surrounding the work related to its subject matter and authenticity. Questions have been raised with regards to the authenticity of the footage (whether or not what are depicted are actually suicides) and the subject matter (the depiction of actual suicides as part of an art piece).

==== BIT Plane, 1998 ====
The BIT plane is a radio-controlled model aircraft, designed by the Bureau of Inverse Technology and equipped with a micro-video camera and transmitter. Its name could be a reference to bit plane, a set of digital discrete signals. In 1997, it was launched on a series of sorties over the Silicon Valley to capture an aerial rendering.

Guided by the live control-view video feed from the plane, the pilot on the ground could steer the unit deep into the heartlands of the Information Age. Most of the corporate research parks in Silicon Valley are no-camera zones and require US citizen status or special clearance for entry. The bit plane (with an undisclosed citizenship) flew covertly through this rarified information-space, buzzing over the largest concentration of venture capital in the world, returning with several hours of aerial footage.

==== The Art of The Eco-mindshift, 2009 ====
Jeremijenko gave a TED Talk in October 2009. Here she discussed her various projects and what she was currently working on with the Environmental Health Clinic. In the TED Talk she also discusses what her plans are to improve the environment in industrious areas like New York City.

=== Art installations ===
In 1988, Jeremijenko co-founded the Livid rock festival in Brisbane. She credits her involvement in helping her move towards public art as she created installations that would appeal to the young crowd.

==== D4PA: Designed 4 Political Action ====
A catalogue of devices and strategies for political engagement and direct action developed by the Bureau of Inverse Technology and others. Described by Wired Magazine as "the DARPA of dissent".

==== Live Wire (Dangling String), 1995 ====
In 1995, as an artist-in-residence at Xerox PARC in Palo Alto, California under the guidance of Mark Weiser, she created an art installation made up of spinning strings that changed speed relative to the amount of internet traffic. The work is now seen as one of the first examples of ambient or "calm" technology. This was installed in an office setting, "ultimately opening up a space for different narratives around, and reconfigurations of, the ubiquitous interface and ubicomp to emerge."

==== OneTree(s), 1999 ====
One Tree(s) was a public experiment that provided material and scientific evidence on environmental and cultural issues. Jeremijenko raised one hundred trees that were cloned from a single origin tree. This project explored issues such as global warming, air quality and genetically modified organisms. This art installation facilitates personal interpretation. It brilliantly uses the concept of information and conceptual art to communicate science. It removes the use of documentation like charts and graphs and challenges the concept of pure visualization in presenting information to its audience.

==== OOZ ====
OOZ was a series of exhibitions where animals pressed buttons to produce human speech. The series ran in 2006 at Mass MoCA.

==== Feral Robots ====
An open source robotics project providing resources and support for upgrading the raison d'etre of commercially available robotic dog toys; and facilitating mediagenic Feral Robotic Dog Pack Release events. Because the dogs follow concentration gradients of the contaminants they are equipped to sniff, their release renders information legible to diverse participants, provides the opportunity for evidence-driven discussion, and facilitates public participation in environmental monitoring and remediation.

==== Tree Logic, 1999 - 2023 ====
For Tree Logic, Jeremijenko suspended six live flame maple trees from a truss in courtyard A at the Massachusetts Museum of Contemporary Art (MASS MoCA). Although the trees were hung upside down, they still grew towards the sun, producing unnatural shapes, and "raising questions about what the nature of the natural is."

==== Biotech Hobbyist magazine ====
(1st issue) An online magazine with kits and resources to bring biotech to the garage, bedroom, and everyman, to raise the standards of evidence and capacity for public involvement in the political decisions on the biotechnological future.

==== Bat Billboard, 2008 ====
Created in 2008, this project's goal was to dispel misinformation, as well as educate people on bats, their habitat, and activities. The billboard was an interactive home for bats that would display written messages based on the sonar messages the bats were sending. This work was showcased at MoMA's 2011 exhibit "Talk to Me".

===== Environmental Health Clinic, 2009 =====
This clinic addressed peoples concerns with the environment by prescribing design interventions to "impatients" (rather than patients, as people are " too impatient to wait for legislative change." For example, people concerned about water quality were instructed to put tadpoles (which are sensitive to contaminants) into water samples for monitoring and to name each tadpole after a bureaucrat whose decisions could affect water quality.

==== xAirport, 2010 ====
Designed with Fletcher Studio, this wetland airport was a temporary installation at the San Jose Biennal in September 2010 to "reimagine" how we fly. This worked with the xAirport team and ICON A5 to develop a light aircraft to make wet landings.

=== Electronic literature ===
==== HowStuffIsMade, 2005 - ongoing ====
How Stuff is Made (HSIM) is a visual encyclopedia documenting the manufacturing processes, environmental costs and labor conditions involved in the production of contemporary products. This is a wiki-based student-authored academic project to change the information available on and about producing materials. Each semester, students in Jeremijenko 's course in NYU researched products and created photo essays for this wiki. The work was shown in the International Symposium on Electronic Art (ISEA) in 2006.

== Awards ==
- 2013 Creative Capital Emerging Fields Award
- 2011 Fast Company's Most Influential Women in Technology
- 2005 I.D. magazine annual Forty (#37)
- 1999 Rockefeller Fellow
- 1999 Technology Review's Top 100 Young Innovators

== Selected work timeline ==
Year	Title	Type	Details
2010	xAirport	Installation	http://www.environmentalhealthclinic.net/xairport/
2004	Clear Skies: FaceMasks		http://xdesign.ucsd.edu/facemasks/
1999	Tree Logic	Installation	
1998	Onetree	Installation	https://www.nyu.edu/projects/xdesign/onetrees/description/index.html
1998	Bitplane	film	
1998	CIRCA: The Ratio Virus		
1997	ALifeTree		http://www.onetrees.org/
1997	Suicide Box	Film	https://www.bureauit.org/sbox/
1997	1/2 Life Ratio		
1996	The Corporate Imagination	Film	
1996	Voice Box	Installation	
1996	Crossover Date		http://bureauit.org
1995	Live Wire	Installation	
1995	Despondency Index		
1993	The Bureau of Inverse Technology	Film	

== See also ==
- Bureau of Inverse Technology
- Critical technical practice
