= Oregon housing shortage =

The U.S. state of Oregon has enacted several reforms since the 2010s to address a statewide shortage of housing supply.

== Effects ==
=== Homelessness ===
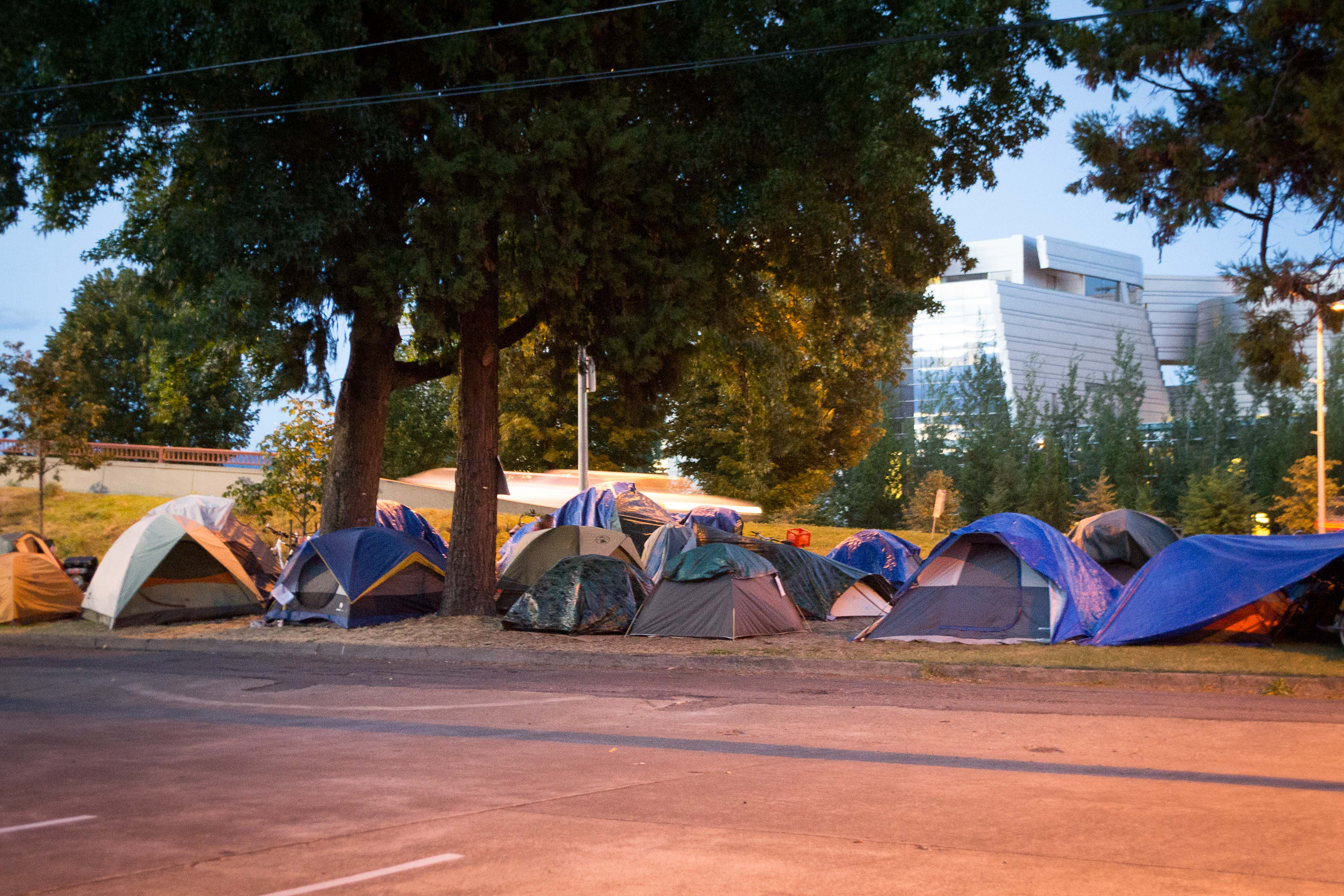
Whoville Homeless Camp in Eugene, Oregon, 2013

In 2016, a report from the Department of Housing and Urban Development (HUD) revealed that the U.S. state of Oregon had an estimated homeless population of 13,238 with about 60.5% of these people still unsheltered. In 2017, these numbers were even higher. As of January 2017, Oregon has an estimated 13,953 individuals experiencing homelessness. Of this homeless population, 1,083 are family households, 1,251 are veterans, 1,462 are unaccompanied young adults (aged 18–24), and 3,387 are individuals experiencing chronic homelessness. As of 2022, 17,959 people total experienced homelessness in Oregon, with 2,157 individuals being youth under 18, 6,671 being female, 10,931 being male, and 131 being transgender. Also among the 17,959 total homeless in 2022, 15,876 were Non-Hispanic/Non-Latino, 2,083 were Hispanic/Latino, 13,960 were white, 1,172 were Black, African American, or African, 101 were Asian or Asian American, 880 were Native American, and those of multiple race were 1,619. Oregon has seen an increase in its total homeless population consistently every year since 2010. In last three years specifically Oregon has seen a 98.5% increase 2021-2022, 22.5% increase 2020-2021, and a 13.1% increase 2019-2020.

Homeless people have found themselves unwelcome near businesses in Portland. Some of the complaints given are that homeless people 'scare customers away'; 'are too noisy'; and that 'they block the way'. A city ordinance called 'sidewalk obstruction ordinance' was an ordinance which homeless advocates complained "criminalizes homelessness". This was however, quashed by a judge's decision in 2009. This decision left the police and business owners with disorderly conduct which the police chief said comes with the difficulty of proving intent and finding witnesses.

=== Urban growth boundary ===
Oregon restricts the development of farm and forest land. Oregon's law provides that the urban growth boundary be adjusted regularly to ensure adequate supply of developable land; as of 2018 the boundary had been expanded more than thirty times since it was created in 1980. In the Metro area, the urban growth boundary has to have enough land within it for 20 years of growth; it is reviewed every six years. Other cities in Oregon seek regulatory review of proposed urban growth boundary expansions as needed. Some economic analysis has concluded that farmland lying immediately outside of Portland's growth boundary is worth as little as one-tenth as much as similar land located immediately on the other side; other analysis have found that the UGB has no effect on prices when some other variables are taken into account.

Urban growth boundaries have come under an increasing amount of scrutiny in the past 10 years as housing prices have substantially risen, especially on the West Coast of the U.S. By limiting the supply of developable land, critics argue, UGBs increase the price of existing developable and already-developed land. As a result, they theorize, housing on that land becomes more expensive. In Portland, Oregon, for example, the housing boom of the previous four years drove the growth-management authority to substantially increase the UGB in 2004. While some point to affordability for this action, in reality it was in response to Oregon State law. By law, Metro, the regional government, is required to maintain a 20-year supply of land within the boundary. Even with the addition of several thousand acres (several km^{2}) housing prices continued to rise at record-matching paces. Supporters of UGBs point out that Portland's housing market is still more affordable than other West Coast cities, and housing prices have increased across the country.

== Responses ==
=== State ===
==== 2019 session ====
===== HB 2001 =====
HB 2001, signed into law by Governor Kate Brown on August 14, 2019, provides an alternative to single-family zoning. The law allows duplexes, triplexes, fourplexes, and cottage clusters (which are several smaller homes built around a community backyard or other green space) to be built on land zoned for single family homes in cities with over 25,000 residents. In cities with over 10,000 residents duplexes will be allowed on land zoned for single family homes.

==== 2020 session ====
The Land Conservation and Development Commission passed a model housing code for mid-size cities to adopt to allow for missing middle housing.

==== 2021 session ====
===== SB 458 =====
SB 458, signed into law by Brown, amended HB 2001 to require all applicable local governments to allow lot divisions.

==== 2022 session ====
The LCDC passed a rule change prohibiting certain cities from enforcing parking requirements near high-frequency transit service.

==== 2024 session ====
===== SB 1537 =====
SB 1537, signed into law by Governor Tina Kotek on April 17, 2024, was drafted in order to provide more affordable housing options for local governments. Among its provisions:

- requiring the Department of Land Conservation and Development and the Department of Consumer and Business Services to jointly establish and administer the Housing Accountability and Production Office.
- providing qualifying local governments a one-time option to add up to 100 net acres of residential land to their Urban Growth Boundary. Additional acreage may be included to support the future residents, such as for parks, schools, commercial spaces, and roads.

===== Other 2024 bills =====
Other bills were passed in 2024:

- SB 1530: a $75 million revolving loan fund to help local governments issue loans for affordable low-income housing.
- HB 4134: Requiring the Oregon Business Development Department to provide grants to cities for specified infrastructure projects that will benefit housing developments that will make at least 30 percent of the dwelling units affordable to workforce income households

==== 2025 session ====
Kotek signed HB 2347, which authorized the Department of Land Conservation and Development to help tribes with planning assistance for housing production.

=== Local ===
==== Portland ====
On August 12, 2020, the Portland City Commission enacted 3-1 the Residential Infill Project (RIP) ordinance, which allows for up to four homes on lots across most of the city (including duplexes, triplexes and fourplexes), including in areas previously zoned for single-family housing, and exceed the mandate of HB 2001. On June 1, 2022 (effective June 30, 2022), the ordinance was expanded by the Commission with technical amendments as Residential Infill Project Part 2 (RIP2), which focuses on larger lots in outlying areas (R10 and R20), created new standards for accessory dwelling units and cottage clusters for all single-dwelling zones and brought the city in compliance with SB 458. In a progress report, the city stated that the enactment of both ordinances resulted in over 1,400 new housing units being built since RIP1 took effect, resulting in an increase in housing construction and availability, with middle housing being the most popular form of housing constructed in single-family areas and the majority of new middle housing being built between the Willamette River and I-205.
