= KIOSK =

British architecture magazine

KIOSK is an art, design and architecture magazine, the first edition of which was published in November 2007. The magazine was created by artists, designers, architects, historians, theorists, curators and experts in the built environment and has a wrap-around poster cover of the work of a featured artist, designer, or architect. It is published on a biannual basis.

KIOSK is edited by Marq Smith, and published by Simon Ofield.

== Notable contributors ==
Issue 1 (Winter 2007/08) contains:

- Fiona Banner (Feature poster artist)
- Jack Lohman, Director of the Museum of London
- Marilyn Martin, Director of Art Collections, Iziko South African Museum
- Geoff Grandfield
- Sara Fanelli
