= Claudia Bitrán =

Chilean-American artist

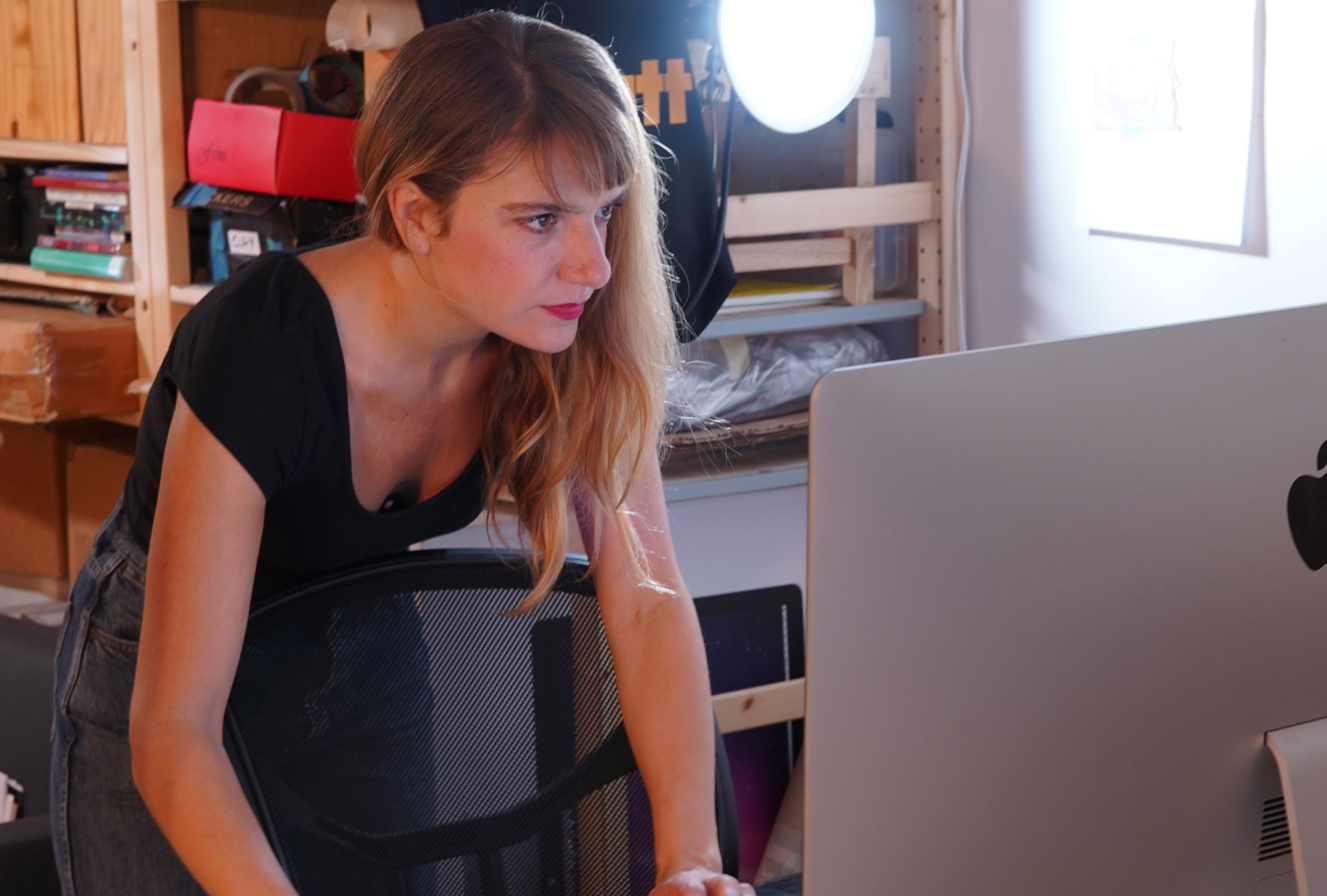
- Born: 24 December 1986
- Education: Pontifical Catholic University of Chile, Rhode Island School of Design
- Occupations: Painter, video artist, university teacher
- Employer: Pratt Institute
- Awards: Guggenheim Fellowship (visual arts, 2023, 2023)
- Website: www.claudiabitran.com

Claudia Bitrán (born 1986) is a painter, video artist, and educator. She spent her formative years in Santiago, Chile, and currently resides in Brooklyn, New York.

== Early life and education ==
Bitrán spent her formative years in Santiago, Chile, and obtained her French Baccalauréat in literature at Lycée Saint-Exupéry, minoring in cinéma, while taking singing courses at La Escuela Moderna de Música de Chile. She completed her Bachelor of Fine Arts (BFA) at the Pontifical Catholic University of Chile in 2009 and earned her Master of Fine Arts (MFA) in painting from the Rhode Island School of Design in 2013. In 2011, Bitrán participated in the televised talent show Mi Nombre Es... as a Britney Spears impersonator.

== Life and work ==
Bitrán's artistic practice revolves around painting and video, often employing DIY aesthetics to portray the realms of social media and pop culture. Her work encompasses a wide range of painting techniques that transform source material into rich and layered surfaces, effectively recontextualizing the content of her videos.

Bitrán maintains an active artistic career both in painting and in video, and shows internationally. Her work is in public and private collections within the US, Europe, and Chile. She is known primarily for her shot for shot remake of the film Titanic (1997), called Titanic, a deep emotion, her Britney Spears Impersonations and visual works, her painting animations that depict viral epic fails, and her white shoe teen installations.

Bitrán has had solo exhibitions at Cristin Tierney Gallery in New York (2022, 2025), the KIOSK Cultural Center, in Ghent, Belgium (2025), the Centro Cultural Matucana 100 in Santiago (2023), marytwo Gallery in Lucerne, Switzerland (2023), Signs and Symbols Gallery in New York (2022), Walter Storms Galerie in Munich (2020), Practice Gallery in Pennsylvania (2018), and the Roswell Museum and Art Center in New Mexico (2017).

Bitrán's recent solo show at Cristin Tierney Gallery, Titanic: A Deep Emotion, was covered by notable publications such as in articles written by art critic Jerry Saltz for New York Magazine, the writer Jillian Steinhauer for The New York Times, Artnet, Impulse Magazine, CBC Arts, AM NY, Interlocutor Magazine, New York Today, and Artforum.

Bitrán exhibited work at the art fair Spring/Break Art Show, New York, N (2024) in a solo Artist Spotlight Booth Claudia Bitran: White Shoes, as well as at Filmfest Dresden International Short Film Festival, in Dresden, Germany, (2024) and at Zona Maco with Cristin Tierney Gallery, Ciudad de Mexico, Mexico (2024)

Bitrán’s work was awarded and acquired by the Government of Chile's Ministry of Cultures for the program for Arts and Heritage in 2026. Additionally, Bitrán is the recipient of the Visual Arts Guggenheim Fellowship in 2023, the FondArt Nacional Audiovisual in 2022, the Emergency Grant from the Foundation for Contemporary Arts in 2015, and the Jerome Foundation Grant for Emerging Filmmakers in 2015. She received 1st Prize in the Britney Spears Dance Challenge, and a 1st Honorable Mention at the Bienal de Artes Mediales, Chilean National Museum of Fine Arts in Santiago, Chile.

Bitrán has completed residencies at Pioneer Works, Skowhegan School of Painting and Sculpture, Roswell Artist-in-Residence Program, Smack Mellon Studio Program, Outpost Projects, and the Wassaic Projects. She works as an educator in the painting department of Pratt Institute and Lehman College.

== Films about Bitran ==
- The F Word (2015) – directed by Robert Adanto; about various fourth-wave feminist artists
