= Sonia Hirt =

American academic

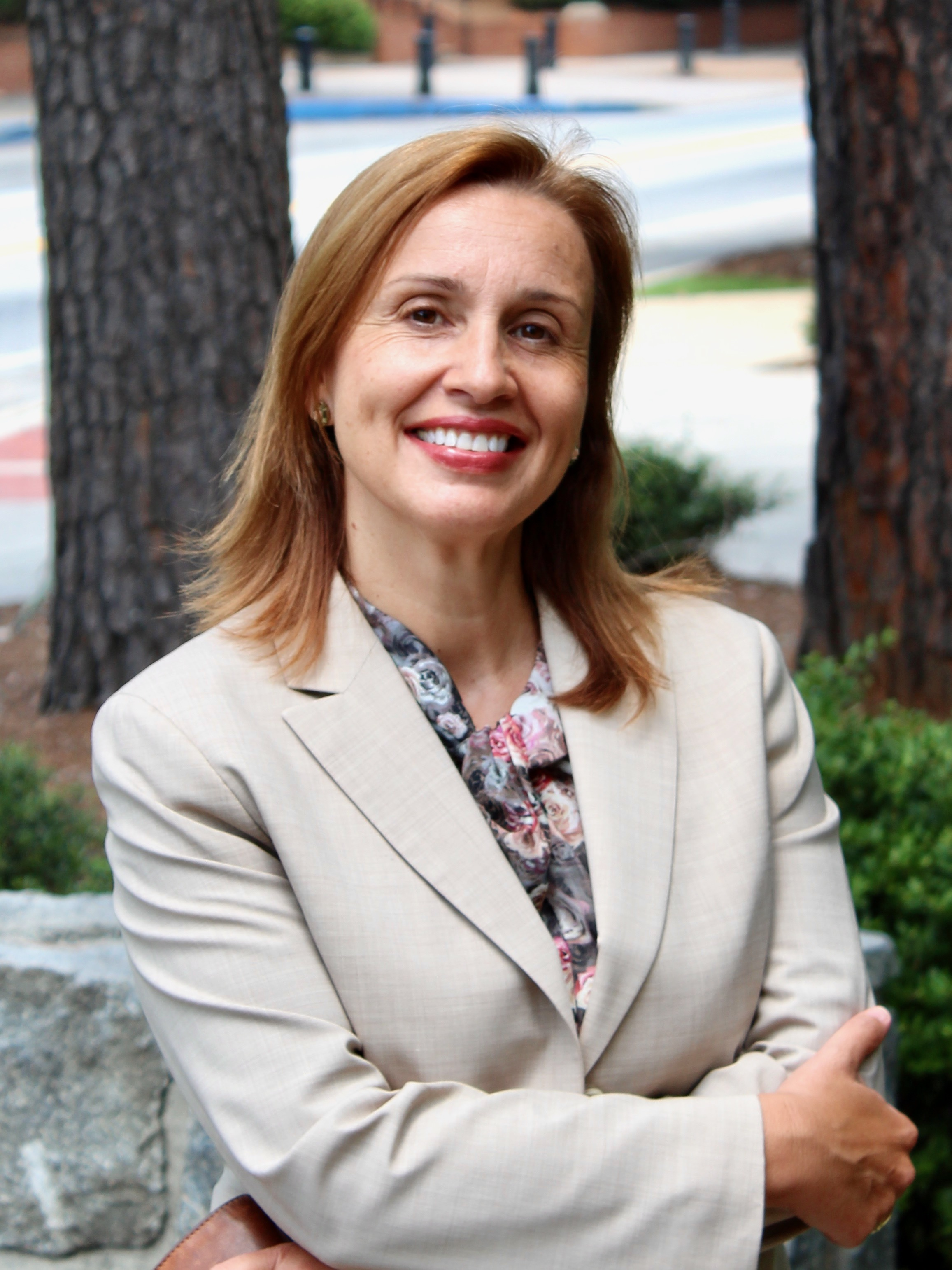
- Prof. Hirt in 2015
- Born: Sofia, Bulgaria

Academic background
- Education: University of Architecture, Civil Engineering and Geodesy, Sofia, Bulgaria
- Thesis: (2003)
- Doctoral advisor: Johnathan Levine, Scott Campbell

Academic work
- Discipline: Landscape architecture, Urban Planning
- Sub-discipline: Comparative urban form with a focus on Central and Eastern Europe; comparative urban planning and land-use regulation with a focus on Europe and the United States; and urban planning and design theory and history
- Institutions: University of Georgia College of Environment + Design, University of Maryland, College Park School of Architecture, Planning and Preservation, Virginia Tech College of Architecture and Urban Studies

Sonia Anguelova Hirt is a professor of Landscape Architecture and Planning and dean in the College of Environment + Design at the University of Georgia.

== Academic career ==
After training as an architect at the University of Architecture, Civil Engineering and Geodesy in her hometown of Sofia, Hirt earned masters (1995) and doctoral (2003) degrees from the Alfred Taubman College of Architecture and Urban Planning at the University of Michigan, Ann Arbor. In 2003 she became an assistant professor at the University of Toledo College of Languages, Literature and Social Sciences, and moved the next year to another assistant professorship at Virginia Tech's College of Architecture and Urban Studies. In 2011 she served as a visiting professor at the Harvard Graduate School of Design. In 2016 she was named dean of the School of Architecture, Planning and Preservation at the University of Maryland, College Park, replacing David Cronrath. Her most recent appointment is at the University of Georgia in 2018 as the Hughes Professor in Landscape Architecture and Planning. With Nicholas Dagen Bloom she is editor of the Journal of Planning History.

Hirt's work attempts to explain why houses in the U.S. are so large relative to other industrialized nations. "People intuitively often think that this is the explanation … because America is such a big country. Well, this is true, but Russia is a big country. Kazakhstan is a big country. Space itself doesn’t really make people do one thing or another." She rebuts President Trump's message to immigrants that "Our country is full", saying "Factually speaking, the country is not actually full — that’s impossible. The real question is, if you continue on the current path of immigration, does this bring more benefits than it brings costs?" She also notes the unusual preponderance of single-family zoning: "I could find no evidence in other countries that this particular form – the detached single-family home – is routinely, as in the United States, considered to be so incompatible with all other types of urbanization as to warrant a legally defined district all its own, a district where all other major land uses and building types are outlawed."

== Awards ==
Zoned in the USA: The Origins and Implications of American Land-Use Regulation won the biennial John Friedmann Book Award from the Association of Collegiate Schools of Planning, and an honorable mention for the 2015 Best Book in Urban Affairs Award from the Urban Affairs Association. Iron Curtains: Gates, Suburbs and Privatization of Space in the Post-Socialist City received a 2014 honorable mention from Harvard's Davis Center for Russian and Eurasian studies for "outstanding monograph published on Russia, Eurasia, or Eastern Europe in anthropology, political science, sociology, or geography".

== Selected publications ==
- Iron Curtains: Gates, Suburbs, and Privatization of Space in the Post-socialist City. Wiley & Sons. 2012. ISBN 978-1444338270.
- "Suburbanizing Sofia: Characteristics of Post-Socialist Peri-Urban Change". Urban Geography. 28 (8): 755–780. 2013. doi:10.2747/0272-3638.28.8.755. ISSN 0272-3638. S2CID 145548276.
- Zoned in the USA: The Origins and Implications of American Land-Use Regulation. Cornell University Press. 2014. ISBN 978-0-8014-5305-2.
- After the crises of modernity: Urban planning and patterns in post-industrial Cleveland, Ohio, and post-socialist Sofia, Bulgaria (doctoral thesis). University of Michigan. 2003. hdl:2027.42/123604.
