= Mark McKnight =

American photographer (1984)

- Born: Mark Armijo McKnight; April 10, 1984 (age 42); Los Angeles, California
- Education: University of California, Riverside; San Francisco Art Institute
- Known for: Photography
- Notable work: Hunger for the Absolute
- Awards: Guggenheim Fellowship Fulbright Program Aperture Foundation Light Work Photobook Award

Mark Armijo McKnight (April 10, 1984) is an artist and photographer known for his black-and-white images of nude bodies and landscapes in the American West. He shoots primarily on a 4x5 view camera, and regularly includes members of his queer community; people with bodies that have traditionally been excluded from art history. McKnight's photographs are frequently discussed in relation to beauty, abjection, queerness, landscape, eroticism and the history of photography.

== Early life and education ==
McKnight was born in Santa Clarita, California. His mother is Nuevomexicana and his father is Anglo-American from Tennessee. The artist was introduced to photography in high school, when he took a class that trained him to use cameras and a darkroom. McKnight has said about his childhood, "My close proximity to the culture in Los Angeles proper and also the sense of boredom I felt being on the geographical margins of it (not to mention the sense of isolation that was compounded by being young, brown, and gay in a predominantly conservative, white area) were instrumental in making me who I am today."

McKnight attended College of the Canyons, in Santa Clarita and transferred to the San Francisco Art Institute. In 2009 he was a Fulbright Scholar in Finland. McKnight received an MFA from the University of California, Riverside.

== Art works ==
=== Decreation ===
"Decreation" is an ongoing series of black-and-white photographs McKnight has been working on since 2018. The subject matter includes bodies, and otherworldly landscapes. The photographs are high contrast, often underexposed and in dramatic natural lighting with details in shadows deliberately rendered illegible through the printing process. In the photograph titled "Eric Voiding" a half-naked man sits on a rock, simultaneously urinating into a river and peeling his shirt off, over his face. The title "Decreation" is derived from French mystic Simone Weil, and describes an act of self effacement with the intention to connect with a divine power.

=== Hunger for the Absolute ===
Hunger for the Absolute was an exhibition staged by McKnight in galleries in Los Angeles and New York. The exhibitions, which featured large format silver gelatin prints at various sizes, describe nude figures copulating amidst rolling hills of the artist's native Southern California. This work was often described by critics for its references to the history of photography. Christopher Knight for example wrote in the Los Angeles Times, "A list of the notable photographers referenced in McKnight’s pictures would include William Henry Fox Talbot, Alfred Stieglitz, Robert Mapplethorpe and Laura Aguilar — 150 years of the medium at once embraced, absorbed and reworked. The frankly symbolic, formally attuned, ethereally abstract and potently political all merge."

=== Heaven is a Prison ===
The artist produced his first monograph Heaven is a Prison in 2020. The book contains over 90 photographs of Landscapes, clouds, and two male protagonists who engage in BDSM sex within the austere chaparral of Southern California. The book was co-published by Loose Joints and Light Work and received the 2020 Light Work Photobook Award.

== Work as an educator ==
McKnight is currently a professor at Rutgers. In 2020 McKnight became an assistant professor of photography at the University of New Mexico.

== Select exhibitions and collections ==
Selected solo exhibitions include Kendall Koppe Gallery, Glasgow, U.K; Park View / Paul Soto, Los Angeles, CA; Klaus von Nichtssagend Gallery, New York; Aperture Foundation, New York; James Harris Gallery, Seattle, WA.

Select group exhibitions include K11 Museum, Hong Kong; Southern Exposure, San Francisco, CA; Museum of Contemporary Art Tucson, AZ; California Museum of Photography & Riverside Art Museum, Riverside, CA; J. Paul Getty Museum, Santa Monica, CA

His work is in the collections of Los Angeles County Museum of Art, CA; The Henry Art Gallery, Seattle, WA; LightWork, Syracuse, NY.

== Awards ==
- 2020 Rema Hort Mann Foundation Artist Grant, Los Angeles
- 2019 Light Work Photobook Award
- 2019 Aperture Portfolio Prize
- 2017 Artist in residence, Storm King Art Center / Shandaken Projects, New York
