= Jason Fletcher (economist) =

American economist

Academic background
- Education: University of Wisconsin–Madison

Academic work
- Discipline: Economics of education Health economics
- Institutions: University of Wisconsin–Madison
- Awards: William T. Grant Foundation Young Scholars Award (2012)

Jason M. Fletcher is an American economist, Professor of Public Affairs and Population Health Sciences in the Robert M. La Follette School of Public Affairs, and former Director of the Center for Demography of Health and Aging at the University of Wisconsin–Madison (2018-2023). His research is in the fields of health economics and the economics of education, as well as the incorporation of social genomics into economic research. He received his B.S. degree from the University of Tennessee–Knoxville in 2000 and his M.S. and Ph.D. from the University of Wisconsin–Madison in 2003 and 2006, respectively. From 2010 to 2012, he was a Robert Wood Johnson Foundation Health & Society Scholar at Columbia University. In 2012, he became a research fellow at the IZA Institute of Labor Economics and received the Young Scholars Award from the William T. Grant Foundation.
