= Stefani Engelstein =

American scholar of German and British literature and the history of science

Academic background
- Education: University of Chicago
- Thesis: Organs of meaning : the "natural" human body in literature and science of the late eighteenth and early nineteenth centuries (2001)

Stefani B. Engelstein is an American scholar of German and British literature and the history of science. She is professor of German Studies and of Gender, Sexuality, and Feminist Studies at Duke University.

== Education and career ==
Engelstein received her BA from Yale University in 1992, and earned her PhD from the University of Chicago in 2001. Following her Ph.D., Engelstein taught in the German Studies program and was the director of the Life Sciences & Society Program at the University of Missouri, Columbia. She moved to Duke University in 2015, where she is also a professor in the Carolina-Duke Graduate Program in German Studies.

== Research ==
Engelstein's early work linked literature and science in German studies, which has since become an area in study of Romanticism. She has written two books, Anxious Anatomy: The Conception of the Human Form in Literary and Naturalist Discourse (SUNY 2008) and Sibling Action: The Genealogical Structure of Modernity (Columbia University Press, 2017), which was published in German as Geschwister-Logik. Genealogisches Denken in der Literatur und den Wissenschaften der Moderne (Trans. André Hansen, De Gruyter, 2024).

Engelstein’s first book, Anxious Anatomy: The Conception of the Human Form in Literary and Naturalist Discourse, traced the way that the body and the scientific fields that investigated it came to be used to legitimate social organization in the modern period. Through readings in German and British natural history, philosophy, and literature, the book demonstrates a shift from using teleological explanations for formative biological processes to using them to legitimate social structures through reference to biology. Anxious Anatomy explores the epigenesis – preformation debate in research on reproduction and healing around 1800 and its relationship to social formations such as class, race, sex, and ethics.

Engelstein’s 2017 book, Sibling Action: The Genealogical Structure of Modernity, proposed the theoretical concept of “sibling logic.” Genealogical systems were built in the nineteenth century to organize knowledge across the sciences, social sciences, and humanities. Genealogies were created for species, languages, religions, races, and subjects. The book argues that the definition of terms in a genealogical system is an effect of isolating sibling terms from each other, but that the boundaries between terms is contingent because of the similarity and overlap among sibling terms. Modern genealogical knowledge systems, on which collective identities have been built, are therefore both inherently unstable, Sibling Action argues. The book explores the histories of these fields and grants a special status to literary experimentation with the models they established. Engelstein proposes a “(counter)genealogical” way to approach political and social formations.

Deborah Coen describes the historical method of the book as a “‘fuzzy’ genealogy of the genealogical disciplines, one that eschews a rigid model of branching in favor of attention to repeated crossings and mixings. This is an attractive template for historical studies that cross today’s disciplinary borders”

== Awards and honors ==
In 2023, Engelstein was awarded a Guggenheim Fellowship, a National Endowment for the Humanities Fellowship, and a Fulbright U.S. Scholars Fellowship. She has also held fellowships from the Alexander von Humboldt Foundation and the Deutscher Akademischer Austauschdienst. Her article “On the Marionette Theater,” “Out on a Limb: Military Medicine, Heinrich von Kleist and the Disarticulated Body,” won the 2001 DAAD Outstanding Article Prize of the German Studies Association.

== Selected publications ==
- Engelstein, Stefani (2000). "Out on a Limb: Military Medicine, Heinrich von Kleist, and the Disarticulated Body". German Studies Review. 23 (2): 225–244. doi:10.2307/1432672. ISSN 0149-7952. JSTOR 1432672.
- Engelstein, Stefani (2008-08-21). Anxious Anatomy. Albany: SUNY Press. ISBN 978-0-7914-7477-8.
- Engelstein, Stefani; Niekerk, Carl (2011). Contemplating Violence. Amsterdam ; New York: Brill Rodopi. ISBN 978-90-420-3294-1. OCLC 709666385.
- Engelstein, Stefani (2011). "Sibling Logic; or, Antigone Again". Publications of the Modern Language Association of America. 126 (1): 38–54. doi:10.1632/pmla.2011.126.1.38. ISSN 0030-8129.
- Engelstein, Stefani (2013). "The Allure of Wholeness: The Eighteenth-Century Organism and the Same-Sex Marriage Debate". Critical Inquiry. 39 (4): 754–776. doi:10.1086/671355. ISSN 0093-1896.
- Engelstein, Stefani (2017-12-05). Sibling Action. New York: Columbia University Press. ISBN 978-0-231-54271-5.
