= Single-family zoning =

Residential planning classification

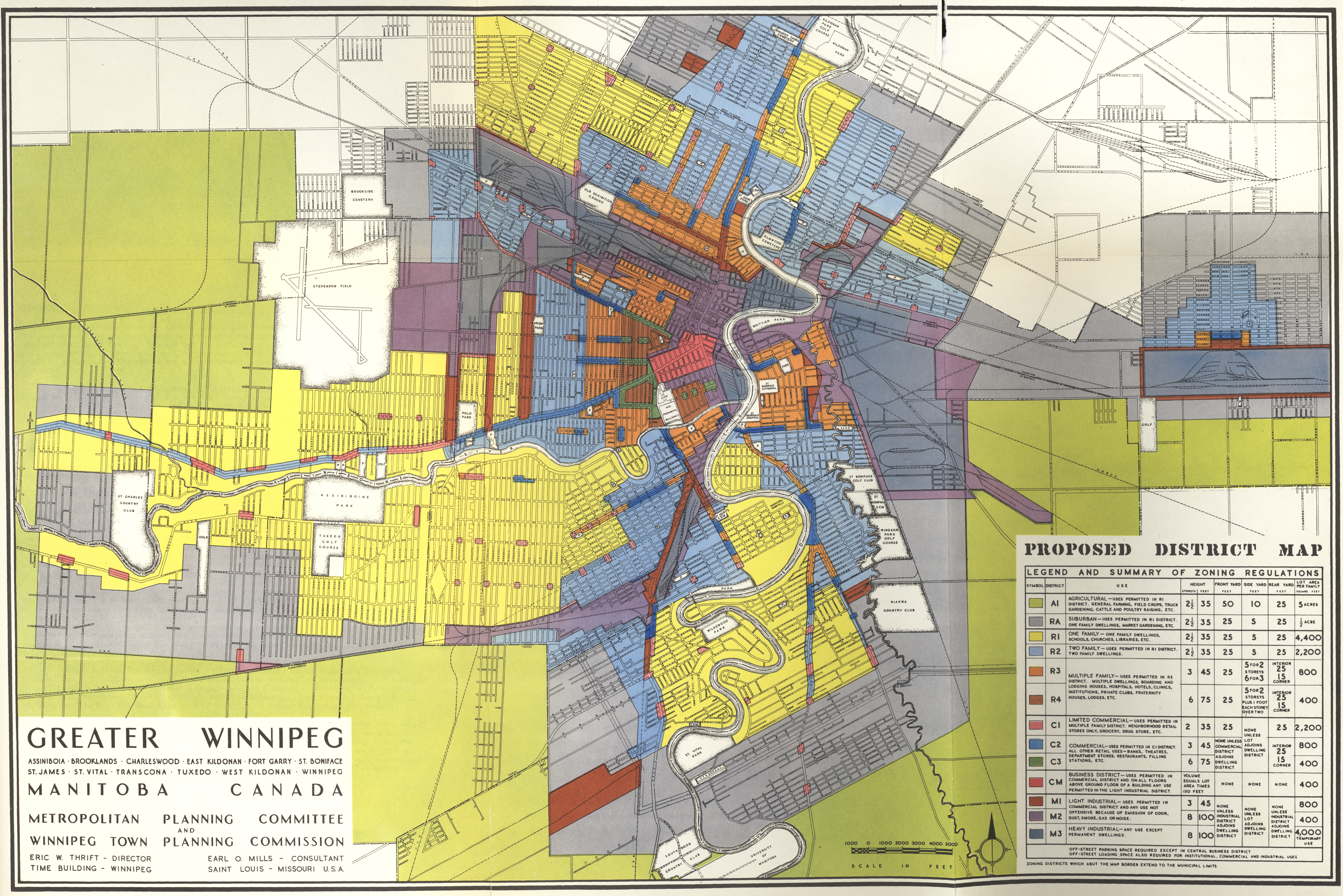
Zoning map of Winnipeg (1947); single-family zoning highlighted in yellow

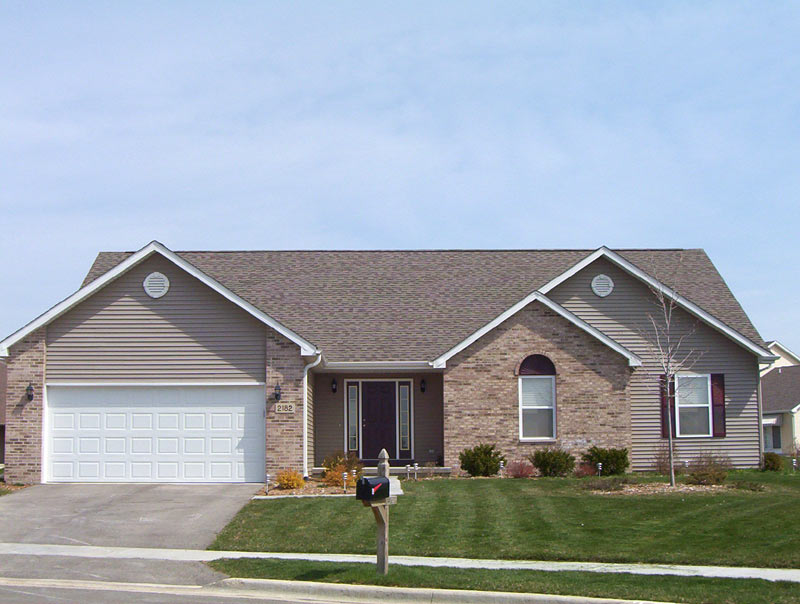
An example of a single-family home in the United States

Single-family zoning is a type of planning restriction applied to certain residential zones in the United States and Canada in order to restrict development to only allow single-family detached homes. It disallows townhomes, duplexes, and multifamily housing (apartments) from being built on any plot of land with this zoning designation.

It is a form of exclusionary zoning, and emerged as a way to keep minorities out of white neighborhoods. Single-family zoning both increases the cost of housing units and decreases the supply. During the 20th century, many advanced European and North American cities introduced restrictions on dense forms of housing, subsidizing single-family housing. In many United States cities, 75% of land zoned for residential uses is zoned single-family. Amid worsening housing crises in many cities, YIMBY movements and urbanists have become increasingly potent political forces, pushing for upzoning of areas exclusively preserved for single-family housing.

Beginning in the late 2010s, many cities across the United States have started looking at reforming their land-use regulations, particularly single-family zoning, in attempts to solve their housing shortages and reduce the racial inequities which arise from housing segregation. These upzoning efforts would not require that new housing types be built in a neighborhood, it merely allows for flexibility in options. For example, changing a single family zoning district to a multifamily residential zoning district would not mandate single family detached homes be converted, nor would it prohibit new single family homes, it would just allow owners of those single family detached homes to subdivide their property, or owners of empty lots to build something other than a single family home.

From the late 2010s and into the 2020s, multiple states including California and Oregon as well as cities like Minneapolis and Charlottesville, Virginia have signed bills, made proposals, or started investigations to effectively eliminate single-family zoning. This includes requiring cities to approve two units and under certain conditions up to four units on single-family lots for example.

== History ==
According to multiple sources, single-family zoning originated in 1916 in the Elmwood neighborhood of Berkeley, California, as an effort to keep minorities, specifically a Black dancehall and Chinese laundries, out of white neighborhoods. Real estate developer Duncan McDuffie was one of the early proponents of single-family zoning in this neighborhood of Berkeley to prevent a dance hall owned by a Black resident from moving into houses he was trying to sell. He worried that families of color moving into the neighborhood would decrease the desirability of the neighborhood and decrease property values. By advocating for single-family zoning, McDuffie and other developers at the time were attempting to price out social groups whom they deemed to be less desirable for the neighborhood. This makes single-family zoning one of many exclusionary zoning policies intended to limit who was able to afford living in a certain neighborhood. The goal of limiting certain neighborhoods to only single-family homes meant that only families who could afford to buy an entire house could live in the neighborhood. There was not the option to subdivide housing so that families who could not afford to buy the whole property could live in smaller units.

After the US Supreme Court's 1917 decision in Buchanan v. Warley, which declared explicit race-based zoning statutes unconstitutional, the court in 1926 decided in Euclid v. Ambler that it was a legitimate use of the police power of cities to ban apartment buildings from certain neighborhoods, with Justice George Sutherland referring to an apartment complex as "a mere parasite" on a neighborhood. This enabled the spread of single-family zoning as a means to keep poor and minority people out of white neighborhoods. In many cases, homeowners and neighborhood associations adopted covenants to prevent homes in their neighborhood from being sold to buyers of color. Restrictive covenants were legal until a 1948 Supreme Court decision in Shelley v. Kraemer made them unenforceable, though they continued to be included on deeds until the 1968 Fair Housing Act deemed that illegal as well.

"Single-family zoning became basically the only option to try to maintain both race and class segregation," - Jessica Trounstine (associate professor of political science at the University of California, Merced)

Sonia Hirt, professor of landscape architecture and urban planning at the University of Georgia, states that "In the early 1900s, the racially and ethnically charged private restrictions of the late nineteenth century were temporarily overshadowed by the rise of municipal zoning ordinances with the same explicit intent." Hirt says single-family zoning is a uniquely American phenomenon: "I could find no evidence in other countries that this particular form — the detached single-family home — is routinely, as in the United States, considered to be so incompatible with all other types of urbanization as to warrant a legally defined district all its own, a district where all other major land uses and building types are outlawed."

== Statistics ==
In many United States cities, 75% of land zoned for residential uses is zoned single-family, and across the state of California as a whole, that number is greater than 66%.

- 94% San Jose, California
- 89% Arlington, Texas
- 84% Charlotte, N.C.
- 81% Seattle
- 79% Chicago
- 77% Portland, Oregon
- 75% Los Angeles
- 36% Washington, D.C.
- 15% New York City

== Effects ==
=== Property values ===
Because this type of zoning reduces the amount of land available for new housing, it pushes development into poor, minority communities or to land beyond the borders of the city. Local public employees like teachers, firefighters, and police officers are often priced out of feasibly living in the communities they serve—even in municipalities that require these workers to do so. These cases are the most consistent exception to these policies that are "acceptable" to affluent residents. Housing developments in these areas designed to be affordable are frequently only granted an exception to zoning rules on the condition that they gave priority to those either living or working there. Even then, local concerns over affordability for existing town residents and public employees often fails to effect changes in zoning laws or the approval of new, denser, more-affordable developments due to local resistance. However, evidence suggests that larger, more heterogenous suburbs are more responsive to calls for change, likely due to an already-existing local population harmed by these policies.

According to Andrew Whittemore, a professor of city and regional planning at the University of North Carolina-Chapel Hill, one effect stems from the belief that higher density housing in neighborhoods decreases housing values, and that one role of the government is to keep homeowner's house values high, and because cities have prioritized single-family homeowners above other groups, this has turned city planners into wealth managers when city planners should be concerned with using zoning to prevent harm. Sonia Hirt supports this, stating, "In the United States, private profit as a result of zoning ordinances that preserved and enhanced 'investment values' was not only fully expected, it was a major zoning goal."

This effect is furthered by the unique reliance of Americans on homeownership and the value of such properties in securing a long-term, stable quality of life according to Monica Prasad, a professor of sociology at Northwestern University. She says that homeownership is a "lynchpin for the long-term distribution of resources," working in many ways as a replacement for the welfare state. The monetary value of the home is key not only for its own sake, but also for the quality of the education it provides access to. Additionally, home equity credit lines have become a key way for Americans to bear the cost of crises, like covering medical debt. Given the far reaching impacts of home value, this creates a natural incentive for homeowners and the government that likely influences policies seeking to protect property values to be as widely implemented and defended across the country as they are.

==== Increases housing costs and decreases housing supply ====
Single-family zoning both increases housing costs and decreases the number of available units by reducing the number of units that can be built on a piece of land. As an example, an old, run-down, single family home on a typical lot in Washington, DC, would sell for about $1 million, but if it were legal for a developer to build a three-story, six unit condominium building on that lot, those units would sell for about $600,000; which is 40% less per unit and 500% more units.

=== Racial segregation ===
In the 1970s, the American suburb became a new battleground for civil rights advocates. The standard American suburb was zoned to limit dense housing and rarely encouraged housing developments attainable for less affluent groups. Activists and scholars argue that these policies were borne out of racist motivations—fears of increased crime and property value degradation, as well as the preservation of "community character" were core rationales of suburbanites for these policies. These fears align with some of the driving cultural forces behind White Flight and suburbanization, with industrialization making cities more dangerous.

According to Sonia Hirt, zoning for detached single family homes in the suburbs provided upwardly mobile Whites more space to raise children in, and prevented the "moral corruption" that more diverse cities risked. Additionally, surrounding these homes with more like them prevented the existence of adjacent businesses that might bring types of people—primarily ethnic minorities and the poor—to the suburbs that these residents wanted to avoid. Since those excluded by these policies inherently could not afford to live in these communities, they lacked the franchise and political capital to secure enough influence to change these policies. Scholars argue that the economic segregation of living spaces deprives those in poor locales of economic opportunity and condemns them to being stuck in areas of concentrated poverty. At the same time, suburban residents get separated from racially-diverse urban areas and thus feel a decreased sense of responsibility for the issues contained there.

A 2020 study from UC Berkeley stated "The greater proportion of single-family zoning, the higher the observed level of racial residential segregation."

=== Political culture ===
According to Sonia Hirt, zoning, as opposed to centralized city planning favored by most other countries, grew popular in the US because of the opposition to state intervention prevalent in American politics. Zoning limits the need for bureaucrats by creating broad land-use guidelines for the private market to follow, rather than directing specific developments under centralized planning. Additionally, arbitration of disputes is largely left up to judicial system, a more popular institution among Americans, rather than through municipal officials.

Other academics highlight how the nature of zoning undermines the neoliberal values often seen as fundamental to the US. William Fischel, an economics professor at Dartmouth College, asserts that, from the outset of zoning policy, the protection of single-family homes from "incompatible" land use nearby was "paramount." While many suburbanites would identify the class mobility represented by a move out to the suburbs as a manifestation of success in the free market, they sought legal protection of their neighborhoods from commercial or high-density residential developments. He notes that early legal court cases regarding zoning policies led to anti-regulation judges ruling strongly in favor of empowering zoning laws.

== Rezoning efforts (2018-present) ==
In the late 2010s, cities across the nation have started looking at reforming their land-use regulations, particularly single-family zoning, in attempts to solve their housing shortages and reduce the racial inequities which arise from housing segregation.

A growing concern over "missing middle housing" developed in the United States housing market. This term refers to options in between renting apartments and buying a single family detached home on an entire lot. "Middle" housing options like this include duplexes, fourplexes, townhouses, and cottage court apartments which could provide options for lower and middle income individuals who cannot afford single family homes. Advocates for getting rid of single family zoning argue that by allowing housing options outside of only single family homes, more people would be able to stay in their cities without being priced out or relying on a shrinking supply of affordable units.

Ending single family zoning is a controversial topic. Many residents and NIMBY (Not in My Backyard) advocates do not want development to increase the density of their neighborhood of exclusively single family homes. Some argue that having apartments will decrease the value of their single family homes. Some argue that upzoning initiatives will increase effects of gentrification by increasing the housing costs in that area. Their argument is that homeowners will have a higher incentive to sell their properties at even higher rates because buyers or developers might be willing to pay more for houses they know they can convert into multiplexes. Those who are proponents of ending single family zoning call themselves YIMBYs (Yes in my Backyard) as a counter-movement to NIMBY sentiments. They argue that more housing is the answer to the housing shortage, so they see the increase in density of their neighborhood as justified.

=== United States ===
==== California ====
===== State-level =====
Before 2021, across the State of California, almost 66% of all residences were single-family homes and almost 75% of all developable land was zoned exclusively for single-family.

In September 2021, governor Gavin Newsom signed Senate Bill 9, which allowed for local municipalities to up-zone single-family-only zoning, allowing cities to approve two units and under certain conditions up to four units on single-family lots. This law is expected to have minimal impact on neighborhoods, as experts estimated that it is only cost effective for 5% of single-family owners to upgrade their property. A study by the Terner Center for Housing Innovation at UC Berkeley estimated that this new law could potentially result in 700,000 new housing units statewide, about 20% of the homes necessary to alleviate the housing shortage of 3.5 million homes.

===== Cities =====
In January 2021, the city council of Sacramento voted to permit up to four housing units on all residential lots to help the city reduce its housing shortage and to achieve equity goals by making neighborhoods with good schools accessible to people who cannot afford to purchase homes there.

In February 2021, the City Council of Berkeley, California, voted unanimously to allow fourplexes in all neighborhoods, with Vice Mayor Lori Droste saying that this is "necessary as a first step in undoing a history of racist housing policies."

San Francisco, where almost 75% of all land zoned residential allows only single-family homes or duplexes, is scheduled in 2021 to discuss a proposal to allow fourplexes on corner lots, and any lot within half a mile from a train station. David Garcia, policy director of the Terner Center for Housing Innovation at UC Berkeley, said that a proposal to allow fourplexes everywhere would be a more equitable proposal, and that research shows that the housing shortage is so large that limiting new housing to specific areas would not sufficiently address the shortage.

==== Idaho ====
In June 2023, Boise City Council unanimously approved a rewrite of the city's zoning code that allowed duplexes and cottage court homes on most of the city's residential land. Small portions of the city were excluded from the upzoning. The new code took effect on December 1, 2023.

==== Maine ====
In April 2022, the Maine Legislature passed LD 2003, requiring cities and towns to increase housing density. It requires municipalities to allow additional units on lots zoned for single-family homes, and to allow at least one accessory dwelling unit on lots with existing single-family homes, hence ending single family zoning in Maine. The Governor signed the bill in April 2022 and it went into effect July 27, 2022.

==== Maryland ====
In October 2024, the Anne Arundel County Council passed Bill No. 72-24, the Housing Attainability Act, legalizing missing middle housing in certain areas zoned for single-family homes. The bill legalizes triplexes, fourplexes, multiplexes, and stacked townhouses, which were not previously defined in the zoning code. The bill is set to take effect on July 1, 2025.

==== Massachusetts ====
In February 2025, the Cambridge City Council voted to end single family-only zoning across the city. Under the new rules, buildings up to four stories may be built without special authorization. And for lots 5,000 square feet or larger, buildings up to six stories do not require special authorization if all units on at least two stories are considered affordable. In the City of Cambridge, a housing unit is considered to be affordable if the tenant or homeowner pays 30% or less of their gross income on housing costs.

==== Minnesota ====
In 2018, Minneapolis became the first major city in the US to end single-family zoning (which had covered almost 75% of their residential land), by allowing duplexes and triplexes in every neighborhood, as well as higher-density housing along transit lines. By allowing triplexes in all neighborhoods their intention is to give all people opportunity to move to neighborhoods with good schools or jobs, as well as to increase affordability, reduce displacement of lower-income residents, and increase both the economic and racial diversity of neighborhoods.

==== Oregon ====
On July 2, 2019, the State of Oregon passed House Bill 2001, requiring medium cities (more than 10,000 people) to allow duplexes in areas zoned for single-family homes and large cities (more than 25,000 people or more than 1,000 people if they are in the Portland metropolitan area) to allow duplexes, triplexes, fourplexes, cottage court apartments, and townhouses in areas zoned for single-family homes. It went into effect on July 30, 2021, for medium cities and will go into effect July 30, 2022, for large cities. Almost 70% of the state (approximately 2.8 million people) lives in a city affected by the bill, and most of those live in a city affected by the provisions for large cities.

==== Texas ====
In December 2023, Austin, Texas' city council voted to allow up to three homes on every lot, effectively ending single-family zoning in the city.

==== Virginia ====
In August 2021, Charlottesville, Virginia's planning commission started investigating the idea of reducing some of their exclusionary zoning rules (particularly single-family zoning) to allow for more housing affordability, where working-class Black residents have been disproportionately displaced to surrounding communities.

==== Washington ====
In 2023, the State of Washington passed House Bill 1110, which banned single-family zoning in medium to large cities statewide. The bill stipulates that cities with a population higher than 25,000 must allow duplexes on all residential lots, and cities with a population higher than 75,000 must allow fourplexes on all residential lots. Two additional units must be allowed for properties within 1/4 mile (400 m) of a major transit stop and properties that include sufficient affordable units. The bill was signed into law by governor Jay Inslee on May 8, 2023.

=== Canada ===
Gentle densification has been proposed in cities including Edmonton, where zoning laws have been unchanged for over 60 years. Upzoning would allow for different forms of development with greater density and height including semi-detached, row housing, backyard houses, and three-storey apartments. The proposed revisions help to idealize the 15-minute city concept. In October 2022, Ontario announced up to three units could be built on a residential property, known as More Homes, Built Faster Act, which would also prevent municipalities from setting restrictions to limit expansion. In May 2023 Toronto approved new zoning laws to accommodate up to four unit multiplexes in neighbourhoods across the city to ease its exclusionary zoning policy, starting with a new height limit of 10 metres to allow for at least three storeys.
