= Morath =

Morath is a surname. Notable people with the surname include:

- Adelheid Morath (born 1984), German cross-country mountain biker
- Inge Morath (1923–2002), Austrian-born American photographer
- Kurt Morath (born 1984), New Zealand-born Tongan rugby union player
- Max Morath (1926–2023), American ragtime pianist, composer, performer, and author
- Mike Morath (born 1977), Commissioner of Education in the Texas Education Agency

== Fictional characters ==
- Morath, a character in the Klingon-language opera ’u’
- Nicholas Morath, a character in the 2000 novel Kingdom of Shadows

== See also ==
- Inge Morath Award
- Inge Morath Foundation
- Petra Morath-Pusinelli
- Pereswetoff-Morath
