= Kimberly dela Cruz =

Filipina photographer

- Occupation: Photographer
- Awards: World Press Photo (2023)

Kimberly dela Cruz is a Filipina photographer. In 2023, she was awarded the World Press Photo award. She has also been the project coordinator of the Philippine Center for Investigative Journalism's Stories Project.

== Career ==
While studying journalism, Dela Cruz became a student activist, carrying her camera during protests. After graduating, she started her career working from 2013 to 2017 as a photo correspondent for Philippine Daily Inquirer before working with documentary photography and working for different publications. Starting in 2016, she began documenting the Philippine drug war through photography and research, and the following year co-produced “Si Kian,” a children's book about the murder of Kian Delos Santos that won a National Children's Book Award. In 2018, she became a fellow at the International Women's Media Foundation and was sent to El Salvador to cover migration, LGBTQI and women's issues.

Among her projects, Dela Cruz produced Death of a Nation, a collection of photographs that narrate scenes related to the drug war in Manila and the lives of families affected by the killings. For the series, in 2019 she was shortlisted for the Magnum Foundation's Inge Morath Award, in 2021 she was awarded the W. Eugene Smith Memorial Fund for Humanistic Photography, and in 2023 was awarded in the “long-term project” category of the World Press Photo contest.

Her work has been featured in several publications and exhibitions internationally, including in The Washington Post, Time magazine, BuzzFeed and several local publications. She has participated in nightly group exhibitions on the work of Filipino photographers who have documented extrajudicial killings in the country. The exhibitions were held in Bosnia, France and Thailand. She has also been the coordinator of the Philippine Center for Investigative Journalism's story project, where she co-produced “Si Kian.”.
