= Yael Martínez =

Mexican photographer

Yael Esteban Martínez Velázquez (born 1984) is a Mexican photographer, based in Guerrero. He is a freelance photographer that photographs for Magnum Photos. In 2019 he won the W. Eugene Smith Grant from the W. Eugene Smith Memorial Fund. His photographs capture a feeling of emptiness and pain suffered by those affected by crime in their region.

== Awards ==
- 2016: Magnum Foundation, Emergency Fund grant
- 2019 2nd Prize, Long-Term Projects, Stories, World Press Photo, for The House That Bleeds
- 2019: W. Eugene Smith Grant, W. Eugene Smith Memorial Fund, a prize of $40,000
