= Krisanne Johnson =

American photojournalist

Krisanne Johnson (born 1976) is an American photojournalist. She is the winner of the 2011 W. Eugene Smith Grant in Humanistic Photography. Her work on post-apartheid South Africa and on HIV/AIDS and young women in Swaziland have appeared in Time, The New Yorker, The New York Times, The Fader, and The Wall Street Journal.

== Early life ==
Johnson grew up in Xenia, Ohio. She received a B.A. in Journalism from University of Colorado and studied graduate visual communications at Ohio University. In 1998, she studied in South Africa at Rhodes University and interned at the Cape Times newspaper in Cape Town, which fueled her later photographic interest in the region.

== Career ==
Johnson began working as a freelance photographer in New York City in 2006. Early in her career, she also worked briefly as a White House photographer. Shortly after, she began working on projects about young women and HIV/AIDS in Swaziland and youth culture in post-apartheid South Africa. Johnson describes how this work has shifted:

"The progression of this work has moved from traditional rites of passage to modern youth culture to an intimate look inside the homes of HIV-positive women. My insights have matured along with these young women. It has allowed me to witness fast-tracked intimacy and friends lost and gained. It has made me see that girls here are constantly on the verge––of giving birth to burying best friends, of finding love to fighting for life alone, stigmatized and heartbroken."

This study of females coming of age recognizes that one of two women in Swaziland were infected with AIDS. Her project, “I Love You Real Fast," contains four chapters—two that explore coming of age narratives juxtaposed with modern youth culture, one that examines life with HIV., and the fourth explores women's daily lives after they move to cities from rural areas.

Her work on Swaziland has been shown at the Visa pour l'Image festival in Perpignan, France and at the Festival of Ethical Photography in Lodi, Italy. Her photojournalism has been included in Time, The New Yorker, The New York Times, The Fader, The Wall Street Journal, CNN, US News & World Report, L’Espresso (Italy), Vanity Fair (Italy), and D La Repubblica (Italy).

== Awards ==
- 2005: 2nd prize, Daily Life, Singles, World Press Photo, Amsterdam
- 2005: First Place and Award of Excellence, Magazine Division / Feature Picture, Pictures of the Year International
- Best of Photojournalism
- 2010: Magnum Foundation Emergency Fund Grant
- 2011: Winner, W. Eugene Smith Grant in Humanistic Photography for I Love You Real Fast
- Getty Images Grant for Editorial Photography
- Photo Urbanism Fellowship from the Design Trust for Public Space (2013–2015)
