= Benjamin Lowy =

American photojournalist

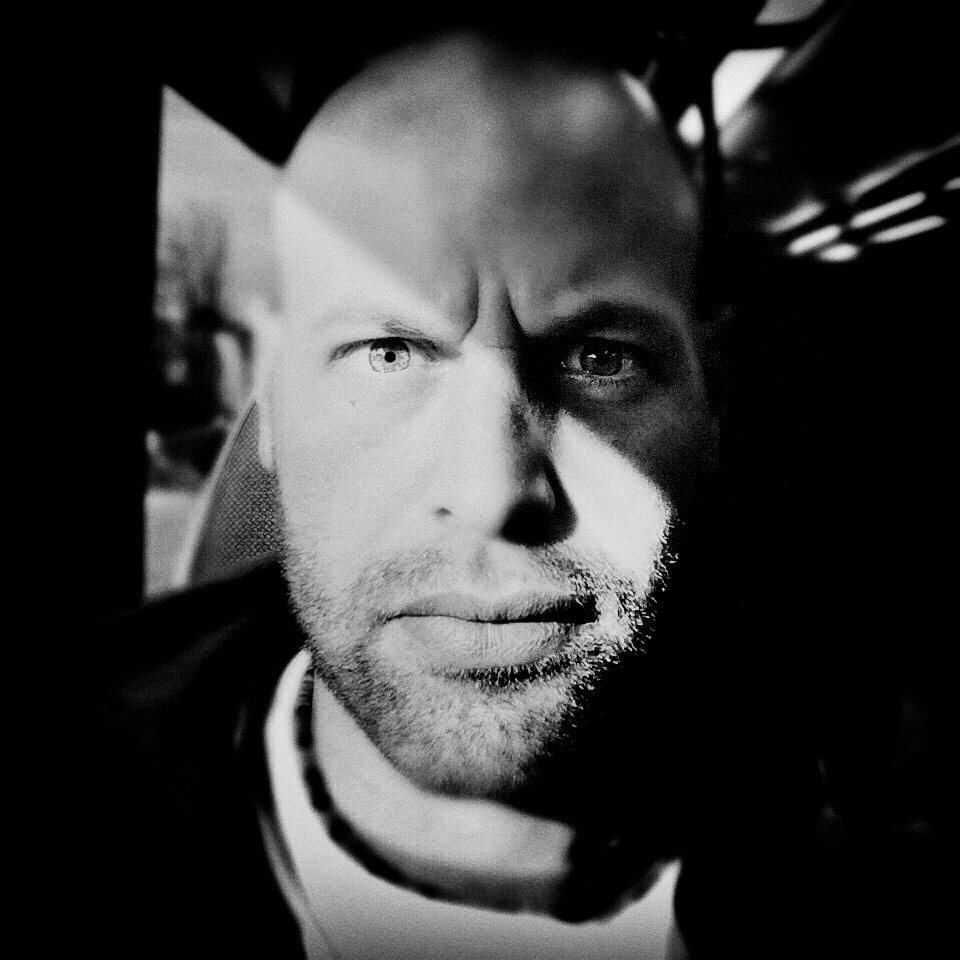
- Born: 1979 (age 46–47); New York, NY
- Education: Washington University in St. Louis
- Occupation: Photojournalist
- Years active: 2002–present
- Spouse: Marvi Lacar
- Children: 2
- Website: benlowy.com

Benjamin Lowy (born 1979) is an American photojournalist. He is best known for his work as a conflict photographer in war zones, and is one of the early adopters of and a vocal proponent for mobile photography.

== Early life and education ==
Lowy was born in New York City, a first-generation American. He attended the Sam Fox School of Design & Visual Arts at Washington University in St. Louis, receiving a BFA in 2002. Initially intending to pursue a career as a comic book artist, he started out as a design and illustration major, before switching to photography. He was heavily influenced by Inferno, a book of James Nachtwey's war crimes photos from the 1990s.

== Career ==
=== Iraq War ===
Shortly after graduating from college, Lowy was hired by the Corbis photo agency and assigned to cover the Iraq War for Time magazine. He was 23 at the time. He covered the war from 2003 to 2008, embedded with numerous units of the American and Iraqi military.

In 2011, Lowy was awarded the Duke University Center for Documentary Studies/Honickman First Book Prize in Photography, appearing on The Daily Show with Jon Stewart to promote the related book, Iraq | Perspectives. The book documents his time covering the Iraq war, with profiles of the US soldiers' experiences as seen from their points of view, along with photos of everyday life in the war-torn country. The photos in the first chapter were shot exclusively through armored military vehicle windows, and the second chapter is composed of photos he took with a DSLR attached to a pair of night vision goggles.

To help himself deal with his own anger resulting from post-traumatic stress disorder after photographing the Iraq war, Lowy began photographing cage fighting.

=== Afghanistan and Libya ===
In October 2011, The New York Times Magazine published "Life During Wartime," a collection of 33 Hipstamatic photos Lowy took of daily life in Kabul, Afghanistan. His Hipstamatic photos of militia in Afghanistan appeared alongside a separate article in The New York Times that same month. Preferring their "rich palette and high contrast," the Times chose to use Lowy's iPhone photos over his 35-millimeter photos.

His photos taken in Libya's war zone were published as a photoblog on NBC News online, and were also featured in GQ. Social media played a large role in the story, as he first published his iPhone photos from Libya in real-time on Tumblr.

=== iPhone photography and use of social media ===
Lowy started out primarily using 35-millimeter digital SLRs, before becoming a pioneer of cellphone photography. He is a vocal proponent of the Instagram and Hipstamatic apps, and in-camera digital processing in general. He began shooting on an iPhone in 2008, shortly after it first came out, and began using the Hipstamatic app around the time it launched in 2010. His first use of the iPhone while on assignment was in 2010, documenting the abandoned town of Uravan, Colorado, for The New Yorker.

After shooting in Libya using iPhone, DSLR and Holga cameras, Lowy suggested to Hipstamatic that the company create a new lens and filter combination better suited for photojournalism, that would be more acceptable for Hipstamatic critics in photojournalism. He collaborated with the company on the new filter, which has minimal processing, was released in 2012 and named The Lowy Lens.

Along with four other photographers, Time magazine assigned Lowy to cover Hurricane Sandy with an iPhone, posting the photos on Instagram, and used one of his iPhone shots as the cover photo of the November 12, 2012 print issue of Time.

Lowy has been publicly defending cellphone photography since 2009, viewing it as an artistic choice, much like photographers who choose black and white film over color. He also feels the anonymity, ease of use and light weight of an iPhone is helpful when reporting in conflict zones. He appreciates that the resulting photos have a unique aesthetic, which helps bring attention for the war or social issues the images are documenting. In high intensity situations, Lowy typically carries two Canon DSLRs, and prime lenses with a variety of focal lengths, depending on the situation; a film camera that shoots 6x6; and his iPhone.

=== Other work ===
Lowy's first assignments were documenting the conflict in the West Bank, and then covering the Beltway sniper attacks in Virginia and DC. In 2008, he covered fashion shows in Paris, Milan and New York City for New York magazine. Lowy covered the 2010 Gulf of Mexico oil spill for GQ. To cover the vast spill, he focused on the oil collected on the water's surface, shooting the psychedelic shapes in extreme close ups and abstract compositions, in an attempt to pique the viewer's curiosity. He also documented the cleanup and the toll the spill took on the environment. His behind the scenes photos of The Daily Show with Jon Stewart appeared on RollingStone.com in 2011. He covered the 2012 Republican and Democratic National Conventions for The New Yorker. He has also covered stories in Darfur, Chad, Haiti, Indonesia and China.

== Personal life ==
Lowy resides in McAllen, Texas with his wife, photographer Marvi Lacar, and their two children, Kaleb and Mateo, who are sometimes featured in his photography.

== Exhibitions ==
- Open Society Foundations, Moving Walls 16, New York, 2009
- Tate Modern, Exposed, London, 2010
- San Francisco Museum of Modern Art, Exposed, San Francisco, 2010
- L'Invalides, Afghanistan Et Nous, Paris, 2010
- Museum of Fine Arts, War/Photography, Houston, 2012
- Brooklyn Museum, War/Photography, Brooklyn, 2013

== Awards ==
- Photo District News 30, 2004
- World Press Photo award, 2008
- Pictures of the Year International, Spot News, Third Place, 2008
- Oskar Barnack Award finalist, 2009
- Critical Mass finalist, 2009
- Pictures of the Year International, Feature Picture Story, Award of Excellence, 2009
- Pictures of the Year International, Sports Picture Story, First Place, 2009
- Duke University Center for Documentary Studies/Honickman First Book Prize in Photography, 2011
- World Press Photo award, 2011
- International Center of Photography Infinity Award for Photojournalism, 2012
- Magnum Foundation Emergency Fund grant, 2012
- W. Eugene Smith Memorial Fund finalist, 2013

== Bibliography ==
- Iraq | Perspectives (2011, Duke University Press Books)
