= Brenda Ann Kenneally =

American photojournalist and documentary photographer

- Born: October 23, 1959 (age 66); Albany, New York
- Education: University of Miami
- Occupation: Photojournalist
- Website: www.brendakenneally.com

Brenda Ann Kenneally (born October 23, 1959) is an American photojournalist and documentary photographer, specializing in social causes and the illegal drug economy. Her work has been featured in the NYT Magazine, Rolling Stone, and Ms. She won the 2000 Community Awareness Award from the National Press Photographer's Association, and the 2001 International Prize for Photojournalism. Kenneally is the founder of A Little Creative Class, a non-profit art organization that works to address the obstacles that deter poor and low-income youth from participation in art and the emerging idea-based economy.

== Early life ==
Kenneally was born in Albany, New York in the late 1950s, and grew up nearby Troy, New York. Her parents divorced eight years into their marriage. She then moved back in with her mother, and Kenneally's grandmother. Kenneally's grandmother sought out to keep Kenneally from making the same mistakes as her mother, barring her from friends whom her grandmother deemed as bad influences. At the age of twelve, she was declared "incorrigible" by the Albany County Family Court and declared a ward of the New York State Division for Youth. She began living in group homes and temporary shelters where she became acquainted with the people her grandmother had once forbidden. Kenneally's cynicism of the system, which influence her later works, was learned in these homes, where experiences with abuses preceded criminal behavior.

She left the city at the age of 17. She fled to Florida and worked intermittently as a snake charmer in the carnival and as an assistant to photographers Rosalind Solomon and Eugene Richards. She attended the University of Miami after getting sober, studying both photojournalism and sociology. She was introduced by her journalism professor at Miami to Tom Schroeder, the editor of "Tropic," the Miami Herald Sunday magazine, which subsequently led to the publishing of her photographs of South Beach, Miami.

After graduating from the University of Miami, Kenneally moved to Bushwick, Brooklyn in 1996 to receive a masters in Photography from N.Y.U graduate school. She began photographing her neighbors’ struggles with poverty and drugs. Her photographs from that time are "an investigation into the effects of various social and political policies."

== Career ==
Kenneally began her career in Florida, photographing the economic and racial divisions. She took photos over a seven-year period before moving back to New York. She moved to Brooklyn and started photographing people's struggles with drugs and poverty. It was her work in New York that gained her national attention for photography.

In 2003, Kenneally began a project she called Upstate Girls. The project was sparked by a teenager named Kayla who approached Kenneally and asked if she wanted to film the birth of her child. She spent the next 14 years photographing Kayla, including taking pictures of her children, family, and friends. Images from the project were posted by Slate in 2014. The images caused a backlash on social media with some people criticizing both Kenneally and Kayla, while others defended them.

She is also a recipient of the W. Eugene Smith Grant in Humanistic Photography which was awarded to her in 2001.

== Bibliography ==
Publication year	Title	Original publisher	ISBN	Notes
2018	Upstate Girls	Regan Arts	ISBN 9781942872832	
2005	Money Power Respect: Pictures of My Neighborhood	Channel Photographics	ISBN 9780976670858	Foreword written by Adrian Nicole LeBlanc)

== Select installations and exhibitions ==
- 2014 - Vintage Miami Photographs, 1939-2003

== See also ==
- List of photojournalists
