= Dieu-Nalio Chery =

Haitian photojournalist (born 1981)

Dieu-Nalio Chery (born 1981) is a Haitian photojournalist, living in Michigan, United States. He won the Robert Capa Gold Medal in 2019 and was a finalist of the Pulitzer Prize for Breaking News Photography in 2020.

== Life and work ==
Chery was born in Haiti.

In 2019, he was shot by a Haitian senator who opened fire outside the country's parliament, wounding him in the face. Later he left the country after becoming the target of violence by gang members. He now lives in Michigan, United States.

== Awards ==
- 2015: Magnum Emergency Fund Grantee, Magnum Foundation
- 2019: Robert Capa Gold Medal, from the Overseas Press Club of America for "Haiti: Nation on the Brink"
- 2020: Finalist, with Rebecca Blackwell, Pulitzer Prize for Breaking News Photography for "images from Haiti, conveying the horrors of lynching, murder and human rights abuses as the country wrestles with ongoing unrest."
