= Mohammed Elshamy =

Egyptian photojournalist (born 1994)

- Born: April 12, 1994 (age 32)
- Citizenship: Egypt
- Education: Cairo University, International Center of Photography
- Occupation: Photojournalist
- Website: www.elshamy.me

Mohammed Elshamy (born April 12, 1994) is an Egyptian photojournalist based in Lagos and New York.

== Education ==
Elshamy holds a Bachelor of Arts degree from Cairo University and New York University (2014). He also did a Certificate Program in Documentary Practice and Visual Journalism at the International Center of Photography in 2017.

== Career ==
Elshamy started his career as a trainee at Egyptian daily newspaper Al-Masry Al-Youm before joining Anadolu Agency based in New York. He has covered notable events such as the United Nations General Assembly meetings, Elections, Muslim protests and other events.

He documented the Egyptian street clashes and the 2013 Egyptian coup d'état while he was in Egypt. He also covered the outbreak of Ebola epidemic in Sierra Leone and Liberia. He also covered the armed rebellion in South Sudan. He also documented the aftermath of Boko Haram attacks in Northern Nigeria. He also documented the Makoko floating slum, which accommodates thousands of people in Lagos. He equally covered the refugee crisis in Europe and social and economic issues in Darfur, Sudan in 2015 His works has been featured in Time Magazine, The Guardian, Al Jazeera, Amnesty USA, and other publications.

== Awards and honors ==
- 2011 - Received the Egyptian Press Award, at the age of 17.
- 2014 - Selected for the Magnum Foundation Human Rights Fellowship in New York University.

== See also ==
- Magnum Foundation
