= Peter van Agtmael =

American photographer

Peter van Agtmael (born 1981) is a documentary photographer based in New York. Since 2006 he has concentrated on the wars in Iraq and Afghanistan, and their consequences in the United States. He is a member of Magnum Photos.

Van Agtmael's photo essays have been published in The New York Times Magazine, Time, The New Yorker and The Guardian. He has published three books. His first, 2nd Tour Hope I Don't Die, was published by Photolucida as a prize for winning their Critical Mass Book Award. He received a W. Eugene Smith Grant from the W. Eugene Smith Memorial Fund to complete his second book, Disco Night Sept. 11. His third, Buzzing at the Sill, was published by Kehrer Verlag in 2016. He has twice received awards from World Press Photo, the Infinity Award for Young Photographer from the International Center of Photography and a grant from the Pulitzer Center on Crisis Reporting,

== Life and work ==
Van Agtmael was born in Washington D.C. and grew up in Bethesda, Maryland. He studied history at Yale, graduating in 2003. He became a nominee member of Magnum Photos in 2008, an associate member in 2011, and a full member in 2013.

After graduation he received a fellowship to live in China for a year and document the consequences of the Three Gorges Dam. He has covered HIV-positive refugees in South Africa; the Asian tsunami in 2005; humanitarian relief efforts after Hurricane Katrina's effects on New Orleans in 2005 and after the 2010 Haiti earthquake, the filming of the first season of TV series Treme on location in New Orleans in 2010; the Deepwater Horizon oil spill in 2010, Hurricane Sandy in 2012 and its aftermath, Nabi Salih and Halamish in the West Bank in 2013 and the 2014 Israel–Gaza conflict and its aftermath.

Since 2006 he has concentrated on the wars in Iraq and Afghanistan, and their consequences in the United States. He first visited Iraq in 2006 at age 24 and has returned to Iraq and Afghanistan a number of times, embedded with US military troops. Later he continued to investigate the effects of those wars within the US. In 2007 his portfolio from Iraq and Afghanistan won the Monograph Award (softbound) in Photolucida's Critical Mass Book Award. As part of the prize Photolucida published his first book, 2nd Tour, Hope I Don’t Die. With work made between January 2006 and December 2008, this "is a young photojournalist’s firsthand experience: the wars’ effects on him, on the soldiers and on the countries involved." The 2012 W. Eugene Smith Grant for Humanistic Photography provided $30,000 to work on his second book, Disco Night Sept. 11, which "chronicles the lives of the soldiers he has met in the field and back home."

In 2025, rapper Kanye West reportedly used a picture Van Agtmael took in 2015 of Ku-Klux-Klan members for the cover of West's ultimately unreleased album Cuck. The use was not authorised by Van Agtmael, who confirmed to Norwegian newspaper Aftenposten that he was pursuing a legal case.

== Publications ==
=== Publications by van Agtmael ===
- 2nd Tour Hope I Don't Die. Portland, OR: Photolucida, 2009. ISBN 978-1934334072.
- Disco Night Sept. 11. Brooklyn: Red Hook, 2014. ISBN 978-0984195428.
- Buzzing at the Sill. Heidelberg, Germany: Kehrer Verlag, 2016. ISBN 978-3868287363.
- Sorry for the War. Mass, 2021.
- Look at the U.S.A.. Thames & Hudson, 2024. ISBN 978-0500027028.

=== Publications with contributions by van Agtmael ===
- 25 Under 25: Up-and-Coming American Photographers, Volume 2. New York: powerHouse, 2008. ISBN 978-1-57687-192-8. Edited by Iris Tillman Hill, preface by Lauren Greenfield, introduction by Tom Rankin.
- A Year in Photography: Magnum Archive. Munich: Prestel; New York, Paris, London, Tokyo: Magnum, 2010. ISBN 978-3-7913-4435-5.
- The Contact Sheet. Pasadena, CA: Ammo, 2012. ISBN 9781934429082. Edited by Steve Crist.
- Photographs Not Taken. New York: Daylight, 2012. ISBN 9780983231615. Edited by Will Steacy.
- Photojournalists on War: The Untold Stories from Iraq. Austin: University of Texas Press, 2013. ISBN 9780292744080. Edited by Michael Kamber, foreword by Dexter Filkins.
- Photographers' Sketchbooks. London: Thames & Hudson, 2014. ISBN 9780500544341. Edited by Stephen McLaren and Bryan Formhals.

== Awards ==
- 2006: 25 Under 25: Up and Coming American Photographers, The Center for Documentary Studies at Duke University, Duke University, Durham, NC.
- 2007: Second prize, General News stories category, World Press Photo Awards, World Press Photo, Amsterdam, for a series depicting night raids in Iraq.
- 2007: Monograph Award (softbound), Critical Mass Book Award, Photolucida.
- 2008: Grant from the Pulitzer Center on Crisis Reporting, Washington, D.C.
- 2011: Infinity Award, Young Photographer category, International Center of Photography, New York.
- 2012: W. Eugene Smith Grant from the W. Eugene Smith Memorial Fund.
- 2014: Second prize, Observed Portraits category, World Press Photo Awards, World Press Photo, Amsterdam.
- 2020: Guggenheim Fellowship from the John Simon Guggenheim Memorial Foundation

== Exhibitions with others ==
- 2009: Battlespace, Prix Bayeux-Calvados, Bayeux, France, 5 October – 1 November 2009. Named after the military term Battlespace.
- 2010: Bringing the War Home, Impressions Gallery, Bradford, England, 17 September – 14 November 2010. Curated by Pippa Oldfield. Also included photographs by Sama Alshaibi, Farhad Ahrarnia, Lisa Barnard, Adam Broomberg & Oliver Chanarin, Edmund Clark, Kay May, Asef Ali Mohammad and Christopher Sims.
