= Anastasia Vlasova (journalist) =

Ukrainian photojournalist

Anastasia Vlasova (Ukrainian: Анастасiя Власова, Russian: Анастасия Власова) is a Ukrainian photojournalist, notable for her coverage of the 2014 Ukrainian revolution and the War in Donbass.

In 2015, Vlasova got a master's degree in journalism at Taras Shevchenko National University of Kyiv. She is a former staff photojournalist for Kyiv Post and collaborates with European Pressphoto Agency. Her photographs have been published in The Guardian, NBC, Newsweek, The Wall Street Journal, The Washington Post, and other media.

Vlasova started her professional career as a photographer in December 2013 during Euromaidan protests. She worked for the website svidomo.com and got an assignment to take pictures of the protests. She subsequently went to Crimea to cover the 2014 Crimean referendum, and after the start of the war in Donbass, she was travelling all the time between Kyiv and the east of Ukraine.

She received an honorable mention for 2015 IWMF 2015 Anja Niedringhaus Courage in Photojournalism Award. The citation includes "quality of light and texture that illicit a connection with the people and the extent of suffering they endure" for her photos and "uncover<ing> the truth of war crimes from both sides" for the photojournalist activity. One of her photographs was selected by the Time among the 100 best pictures of 2015.

Vlasova was the 2015 Magnum Foundation Photography and Human Rights Fellow at New York University, and attended the Eddie Adams Workshop in 2015.

== See also ==
- Serhii Korovayny
