= Serhii Korovayny =

Ukrainian photo-journalist

- Сергій Коровайний
- Born: 1995 (age 30–31); Khartsyzk, Donetsk Oblast, Ukraine
- Occupation: Photo-journalist
- Known for: Photo-journalism during the Russo-Ukrainian war

Serhii Korovayny (Note: Sometimes credited as Serhii Korovainyi.) (Ukrainian: Сергій Коровайний; born 1995) is a Ukrainian photo-journalist notable for his work covering the Russo-Ukrainian war. He is a regular contributor to the Wall Street Journal, and his work has been featured in numerous publications and organizations, such as Time magazine, National Geographic, and the United Nations.

In 2022, Korovayny was awarded the James Foley Award for Conflict Reporting.

Before the war, Korovayny worked primarily on environmental documentary journalism in Ukraine.

Korovayny was a Fulbright scholar and earned a Master of Arts in Photography from Syracuse University.

== See also ==
- Stanislav Aseyev
- Anastasia Vlasova (journalist)
