= Magnum Foundation =

Non-profit foundation

- Company type: Foundation
- Industry: Photography
- Headquarters: New York City
- Area served: Worldwide
- Products: Photojournalism
- Website: www.magnumfoundation.org

Magnum Foundation is a non-profit photographic foundation based in New York City. Its mission is to "expands creativity and diversity in documentary photography."

== History and mission ==
Magnum Foundation was founded in 2007 during the collapse of the media system that had traditionally supported photographic reporting. Founded by the photographers of the Magnum Photos collective, including board president Susan Meiselas, the organization was created as an initiative to support independent, long-form visual storytelling on social issues. As photojournalism practices diversify, the foundation seeks to develop and experiment with new models for documentary photography projects.

Magnum Foundation seeks to create and support a global network of social justice and human rights-focused photographers. The foundation works to preserve the histories of humanistic and documentary photography, including the larger Magnum Photos community estate.

== Programs ==
=== Arab Documentary Photography Program ===
The Arab Documentary Photography Program (ADPP) supports and mentors photographers from across the Arab region. ADPP is jointly funded by the Prince Claus Fund and the Arab Fund for Arts and Culture. It seeks to amplify non-stereotypical and unconventional visual documentation of social issues and narratives relevant to the Arab region. It aims to raise the level of documentary photography in the Arab region by training photographers and expanding their approaches to visual storytelling, to share strong visual narratives from the Arab region regionally and internationally, and to explore wider access to documentary photography and a more active engagement with its audiences. Each year, ten grantees are chosen through an open call for proposals. Mentors for the program are photographers Peter van Agtmael, Tanya Habjouqa, Eric Gottesman, and Randa Shaath.

=== Archives and research ===
Magnum Foundation draws on the legacy of Magnum Photos, which was founded in 1947 as a photographic cooperative that would allow for the creation and distribution of visual images unencumbered by the constraints of for-profit journalism. Magnum Photos has evolved into one of the world's most influential photographic organisations, producing diverse images and content that educate and shape perceptions of world events. Magnum Foundation leads the process of identifying collections and estate holdings of work by Magnum photographers and to connect these materials through an online consortium.

=== Inge Morath Award ===
The Inge Morath Award is given annually to a woman photographer under 30 years of age to support the completion of a long-term documentary photography project. The Award was established by Magnum Photos as a tribute to Inge Morath, who was associated with Magnum for more than fifty years and was one of the first women in the field. The awardee and finalists are selected by the full membership of Magnum Photos during its Annual General Meeting. The award is administered by the Magnum Foundation in partnership with the Inge Morath Foundation.

=== Magnum Foundation Fellowship ===
The Magnum Foundation Fellowship offers mentorship and stipends to photojournalism students and recent graduates. Fellows produce a story around New York City on an underreported or emerging issue. Throughout the fellowship they build relationships with subjects, seek partnerships with organizations, and experiment with multimedia. Calls for applications are announced throughout the year on a rolling basis.

=== Magnum Foundation Fund ===
Formerly known as the Magnum Emergency Fund, it was renamed as the Magnum Foundation Fund in 2017. The Fund supports photographers who are experimenting with new models of socially engaged practice. Through production grants, mentorship, and project development assistance, the Magnum Foundation Fund fosters diversity and creativity in documentary photography and related practices. In collaboration with the Prince Claus Fund, the Magnum Foundation Fund supports both emerging and experienced photographers. The Magnum Foundation Fund is by nomination only – typically educators, editors, curators, and critics with expertise in specific areas around the globe – so as to try to ensure a geographically diverse pool of proposals. (Note: The 2017 list of nominators and judges is available on the Magnum Foundation Fund microsite.)

=== Photography and Social Justice ===
The Photography and Social Justice Program supports and trains early career and emerging photographers, artists, journalists, scholars, and activists who want to pursue social equality and advance human rights through photography.

The Photography and Social Justice Program builds capacity and community among a diverse, international network of Fellows who have not had access to mentorship or training in photography but can demonstrate a commitment to activism and social justice. Priority is given to applicants from regions and communities where freedom of expression is limited. Using New York City as a cultural resource, the program provides space for interdisciplinary experimentation and cross-cultural, critical discourse around photography and social justice. The program has twice yearly laboratories, held at CUNY's Graduate School of Journalism in New York City that include technical trainings, lectures, and discussions exploring photography as a medium for social engagement.

=== Publications ===
Through collaboration and partnerships, Magnum Foundation coproduces books of historic and contemporary documentary photography.

- Bruce Davidson: An Illustrated Biography by Vicki Goldberg. Munich: Prestel. ISBN 9783791381350.
- Eve Arnold: Magnum Legacy by Janine di Giovanni. Munich: Prestel. ISBN 9783791349633.
- Negative Publicity: Artefacts of Extraordinary Rendition by Edmund Clark and Crofton Black. New York City: Aperture. ISBN 9781597113519.
- Afghanistan by Larry Towell. New York City: Aperture.
- Laying Foundations for Change: Capital Investments of The Atlantic Philanthropies. Magnum Foundation; Atlantic Philanthropies, 2014. Edition of 5000 copies. ISBN 9780692279236. (Note: The publication is available to download for free as a PDF from within The Atlantic Philanthropies' dedicated website here.) Given free to funders, philanthropy advisors and social investors.

== Grantees and fellows ==
Name	Nationality	Project Location	Year	Program	Project
Jenn Ackerman (Finalist)	USA	USA	2009	Inge Morath Award	Trapped: Mental Illness in America's Prisons
Hadeer Ahmed	Egypt	Egypt	2016	Arab Documentary Photography Program	Loss
Taslima Akhter	Bangladesh		2011	Photography and Social Justice	
Faisal Al Fouzan	Kuwait	Kuwait	2014	Arab Documentary Photography Program	Friday Gathering
Amira Al-Sharif	Yemen	Yemen	2014	Arab Documentary Photography Program	A Love Song to Socotra Island
Arwa Alneami	Saudi Arabia	Saudi Arabia	2015	Arab Documentary Photography Program	Never Never Land
Tasneem Alsultan	Saudi Arabia	Saudi Arabia	2015	Arab Documentary Photography Program	Saudi Tales of Love
Basel Alyazouri	Palestine		2015	Photography and Social Justice	
Evgenia Arbugaeva	Russia	Russia	2012	Magnum Foundation Fund	Tiksi, The Far North
Santiago Arcos	Ecuador	Chile	2016	What Works	The Skin of Palestine
Santiago Arcos	Ecuador		2013	Photography and Social Justice	
Nazik Armenakyan	Armenia		2011	Photography and Social Justice	
Olivia Arthur (Winner)	UK	Europe/Asia	2007	Inge Morath Award	The Middle Distance
Jessica Bal		USA	2016	Magnum Foundation Fellowship	
Lurdes R. Basolí (Winner)	Spain	Venezuela	2010	Inge Morath Award	Caracas, The City of Lost Bullets.
Mostafa Bassim	Egypt	Egypt	2016	Arab Documentary Photography Program	Post-revolutionary Social Change in Egypt
Mari Bastashevski	Denmark	China	2015	China File/Abigail Cohen Fellow	10,000 Things Out of China
Mari Bastashevski	Denmark	Horn of Africa	2017	Magnum Foundation Fund	State Business: Chapter IV
Mari Bastashevski	Denmark		2013	Magnum Foundation Fund	State Business
Poulomi Basu	India	Kashmir	2016	What Works	Kashmiriyat
Poulomi Basu	India		2012	Photography and Social Justice	
Poulomi Basu	India	Nepal	2016	Magnum Foundation Fund	A Ritual of Exile: Blood Speaks
Endia Beal	USA	USA	2016	Magnum Foundation Fund	Am I What You're Looking For?
Jonas Bendiksen	Norway	Persian Gulf region	2011	Magnum Foundation Fund	Far From Home
Massimo Berruti	Italy	Italy	2015	Magnum Foundation Fund	Epidemic
Matt Black	USA	USA	2015	Magnum Foundation Fund	The Geography of Poverty
Arthur Bondar	Ukraine		2012	Photography and Social Justice	
Injinaash Bor	Mongolia	Mongolia	2016	Magnum Foundation Fund	Mongolian Modern Teenagers
Jasper Briggs		USA	2015	Magnum Foundation Fellowship	
Nadia Bseiso	Jordan	Jordan	2016	Arab Documentary Photography Program	Infertile Crescent
Oscar Castillo	Venezuela	Venezuela	2014	Magnum Foundation Fund	Our War, Our Pain
Daniel Castro Garcia	UK	Italy	2017	Magnum Foundation Fund	Foreigner: I Peri N'Tera
Alejandro Cegarra	Venezuela	Venezuela	2016	Magnum Foundation Fund	Our Invisible War
Mimi Chakarova (Winner)	USA	Eastern Europe	2005	Inge Morath Award	Sex Trafficking in Eastern Europe
Chien-Chi Chang	USA	Burma	2016	Magnum Foundation Fund	The Price of Isolation
Zhe Chen (Winner)	China	China	2011	Inge Morath Award	Bees
Qingang Chen	China	Muli	2014	Magnum Foundation Fund	Patients at Muli County
Mimi Cherono Ng'ok	Kenya	Uganda	2017	Magnum Foundation Fund	Esther C.
Joana Choumali	Ivory Coast	Ivory Coast	2016	Magnum Foundation Fund	Siri Barra (Smoke Work)
Elodie Chrisment (Finalist)	France	France	2014	Inge Morath Award	Pleasure Places—Paris
Jordi Ruiz Cirera	Spain	Argentina	2016	Magnum Foundation Fund	The United Soya Republic
Edmund Clark	UK		2014	Magnum Foundation Fund	Unseen Spaces of the Global War on Terror
Yan Cong	China	China	2015	China File/Abigail Cohen Fellow	
Kathryn Cook (Winner)	USA	Turkey	2008	Inge Morath Award	Memory Denied: Turkey and the Armenian Genocide
Xyza Cruz Bacani	Philippines	Philippines	2016	What Works	Classrooms of Hope
Xyza Cruz Bacani	Philippines		2015	Photography and Social Justice	
Souvid Datta	India/UK	China	2015	China FIle/Abigail Cohen Fellow	
Gabriella Demczuk, (Finalist)	USA	USA	2016	Inge Morath Award	Baltimore Sings the Blues
Dieu-Nalio Chery	Haiti		2015	Photography and Social Justice	
Jessica Dimmock	USA	USA	2005	Inge Morath Award	The Ninth Floor (Finalist)
Jessica Dimmock	USA	USA	2006	Inge Morath Award	The Ninth Floor (Winner)
Carolyn Drake	USA	USA	2014	Magnum Foundation Fund	Invisible Bus
Marko Drobnjakovic	Serbia	Former Yugoslavia	2017	Magnum Foundation Fund	The Last Yugoslavs
Philippe Dudouit	Switzerland	Sahara	2013	Magnum Foundation Fund	The Dynamics of Dust
Thomas Dworzak	Germany	Europe	2016	Magnum Foundation Fund	Europa: The Guide for Refugees
Faiham Ebna Sharif	Bangladesh	Bangladesh	2017	Magnum Foundation Fund	Tea Workers of Bangladesh
Rena Effendi	Azerbaijan	Caucasus	2007	Inge Morath Award	Pipe Dreams: A Chronicle of Lives Along the Pipeline in Azerbaijan, Georgia and Turkey. (Finalist)
Rena Effendi	Azerbaijan	Egypt	2012	Magnum Foundation Fund	We Are Here
Mohamed El Fatih Hamadain	Sudan	Sudan	2015	Arab Documentary Photography Program	Gold Madness
Elsie El Haddad	Lebanon	Lebanon	2015	Arab Documentary Photography Program	Stranded: On Life After Imprisonment
Hamada El Rasam	Egypt	Egypt	2014	Arab Documentary Photography Program	Traces of the Conflict
Mohammed Elshamy	Egypt		2014	Photography and Social Justice	
Reem Falaknaz	UAE	UAE	2014	Arab Documentary Photography Program	The Place of Perpetual Undulation
Stephen Ferry	USA	Colombia	2011	Magnum Foundation Fund	The Poisoning of El Dorado
Adrian Fussell	USA	USA	2012	Magnum Foundation Fellowship	
Carlo Gabuco	Philippines	Philippines	2017	Magnum Foundation Fund	Less than Human
Ziyah Gafić	Bosnia & Herzegovina	Bosnia & Herzegovina	2016	Magnum Foundation Fund	Paradise Lost
Rahima Gambo	Nigeria	USA	2014	Magnum Foundation Fellowship	
Hicham Gardaf	Morocco	Morocco	2015	Arab Documentary Photography Program	Intersections
Balazs Gardi	Hungary		2011	Magnum Foundation Fund	Cresi
Cedric Gerbehaye	Belgium	South Sudan	2010	Magnum Foundation Fund	Land of Cush
Bruce Gilden	USA	USA	2010	Magnum Foundation Fund	No Place Like Home
Eric Gottesman	USA	Ethiopia	2012	Magnum Foundation Fund	Baalu Girma
Emine Gozde Sevim	Turkey	Turkey	2015	Magnum Foundation Fund	Unbeknown
Brigitte Grignet	Belgium	Belgium	2016	Magnum Foundation Fund	Welcome
Claudia Guadarrama (Winner)	Mexico	Chiapas	2004	Inge Morath Award	Before the Limit
Eric Gyamfi	Ghana	Ghana	2016	Magnum Foundation Fund	Just Like Us
Tanya Habjouqa	Jordan	West Bank, Gaza, and East Jerusalem	2013	Magnum Foundation Fund	Occupied Pleasures
Abbas Hajimohammadi	Iran	Iran	2016	What Works	Jesus In Iran
Abbas Hajimohammadi	Iran		2014	Photography and Social Justice	
Curran Hatleberg	USA	USA	2015	Magnum Foundation Fund	Shadow Country
Samar Hazboun	Palestine	Palestine	2014	Arab Documentary Photography Program	Beyond Checkpoints
Eman Helal	Egypt	Egypt	2016	What Works	Back Home
Eman Helal	Egypt	Egypt	2014	Arab Documentary Photography Program	Just Stop
Eman Helal	Egypt		2013	Photography and Social Justice	
Eduardo Hirose	Peru	Peru	2017	Magnum Foundation Fund	Expansión
Zann Huizhen Huang	Singapore	Lebanon	2014	Magnum Foundation Fund	Remember Shatila
Saiful Huq Omi	Bangladesh	UK	2010	Magnum Foundation Fund	The Disowned and The Denied
Sohrab Hura	India	India	2010	Magnum Foundation Fund	Pati
Sara Hylton	Canada	USA	2015	Magnum Foundation Fellowship	
Omar Imam	Syria	Syria	2014	Arab Documentary Photography Program	Live Love Refugee
Nneka Iwunna	Nigeria	Nigeria	2017	Magnum Foundation Fund	Left Behind
Shannon Jansen (Winner)	USA	Sudan	2014	Inge Morath Award	A Long Walk
Liu Jie	China		2012	Photography and Social Justice	
Justin Jin	Hong Kong	Russia	2011	Magnum Foundation Fund	Zone of Absolute Discomfort
Krisanne Johnson	USA	Swaziland (since 2018 renamed to Eswatini)	2010	Magnum Foundation Fund	I Love You Real Fast
Manca Juvan	Slovenia	Slovenia	2016	What Works	Solidarity, Not Charity
Manca Juvan	Slovenia		2011	Photography and Social Justice	
Eyad Kasem	Syria	Syria	2015	Arab Documentary Photography Program	A Small Forest on The Other Side
Nour Kelze	Syria		2015	Photography and Social Justice	
Heba Khalifa	Egypt	Egypt	2015	Arab Documentary Photography Program	Homemade
Tomoko Kikuchi	Japan	China	2014	China File/Abigail Cohen Fellow	
Tomoko Kikuchi	Japan	China	2013	Magnum Foundation Fund	The River
Isadora Kosofsky (Winner)	USA	USA	2012	Inge Morath Award	Selections from "The Three" and "This Existence."
Yuri Kozyrev	Russia	Yemen	2011	Magnum Foundation Fund	Yemen's Unfinished Revolution
Youcef Krache	Algeria	Algeria	2016	Arab Documentary Photography Program	El Houma
Olga Kravets	Russia	Chechnya	2013	Magnum Foundation Fund	Radicalization
Alexis Lambrou	USA	USA	2012	Magnum Foundation Fellowship	Teaching for Life
Sebastian Liste	Spain	Brazil	2012	Magnum Foundation Fund	The Brazilian Far West
Yuyang Liu	China	China	2016	What Works	On Court Uyghur Dreams Grow
Yuyang Liu	China	China	2015	China File/Abigail Cohen Fellow	
Yuyang Liu	China		2014	Photography and Social Justice	
Kai Löffelbein	Germany	Bangka island	2014	Magnum Foundation Fund	Death Metals
Ben Lowy	USA	Libya	2012	Magnum Foundation Fund	iLibya: Libya's Growing Pains
Alex Majoli	taly	Brazil	2011	Magnum Foundation Fund	Modern Slavery
Mehdy Mariouch	Morocco	Morocco	2016	Arab Documentary Photography Program	Bribes de Vie
Claire Martin (Winner)	Australia	Canada/USA	2010	Inge Morath Award	Selections from The Downtown East Side and Slab City
Guy Martin	UK	Turkey	2015	Magnum Foundation Fund	Parallel State
Yael Martinez	Mexico	Mexico	2016	Magnum Foundation Fund	Broken Roots
Justin Maxon	USA		2012	Magnum Foundation Fund	Fallen Not Forgotten
Nadege Mazars	France	Colombia	2016	Magnum Foundation Fund	The Other Colombia
Ramin Mazur	Moldova		2013	Photography and Social Justice	
Tamara Merino (Finalist)	Chile	Australia	2016	Inge Morath Award	Underland
Rafał Milach	Poland	Belarus	2013	Magnum Foundation Fund	The Winners
Karen Mirzoyan	Georgia		2010	Photography and Social Justice	
Karen Mirzoyan	Georgia	Caucasus	2010	Magnum Foundation Fund	Unrecognized Islands of Caucasus
Laura Morton	USA	California	2014	Magnum Foundation Fund	Wild West Tech
Ahmad Mousa Qasem	Iraq	Iraq	2015	Arab Documentary Photography Program	Awaiting Their Dead
Sipho Mpongo	South Africa		2015	Photography and Social Justice	
Loubna Mrie	Syria		2014	Photography and Social Justice	
Pete Muller	USA	Africa	2015	Magnum Foundation Fund	Wildlife Wars: The Growing Movement of Militarized Anti-Poaching
Boniface Mwangi	Kenya		2011	Photography and Social Justice	
Julius Mwelu	Kenya	Kenya	2011	Magnum Foundation Fund	The Disintegration of the Matatus
Natalie Naccache	Lebanon	Lebanon	2014	Arab Documentary Photography Program	Our Limbo
Adam Nadel	USA	Greater Everglades	2013	Magnum Foundation Fund	Getting the Water Right
Dominic Nahr	Switzerland	Kenya	2010	Magnum Foundation Fund	The Unhealed Rift
Showkat Nanda	India	Kashmir	2016	Magnum Foundation Fund	The Endless Wait
Musuk Nolte	Peru	Peru	2017	Magnum Foundation Fund	Open Mourning
Katie Orlinsky	USA	USA	2016	Magnum Foundation Fund	Chasing Winter
Ed Ou	Canada		2014	Magnum Foundation Fund	North
Alessandro Penso	Italy	Bulgaria	2014	Magnum Foundation Fund	Refugees in Bulgaria
Elena Perlino	Italy	Italy	2015	Magnum Foundation Fund	Pipeline
Peter Pin	USA	USA	2011	Magnum Foundation Fellowship	Displaced: The Cambodian Diaspora
Giulio Piscitelli	Italy	Italy	2013	Magnum Foundation Fund	From There to Here
Lauren Pond (Finalist)	USA	USA	2013	Inge Morath Award	Faith and Its Price
Ruth Prieto	Mexico	USA	2013	Magnum Foundation Fellowship	Safe Heaven
Nii Obodai Provençal	Ghana	Ghana	2015	Magnum Foundation Fund	Big Dreams: Life Built on Gold
Leone Purchas (Finalist)	UK	UK	2008	Inge Morath Award	In the Shadow of Things
Asim Rafiqui	USA/Sweden/Pakistan	Pakistan	2015	Magnum Foundation Fund	Law & Order: A People's History of the Law in Pakistan
Pattabi Raman	India		2013	Photography and Social Justice	
Stephen Reiss	USA	USA	2013	Magnum Foundation Fellowship	
Yue Ren (Finalist)	China	Beijing	2005	Inge Morath Award	Gay Scene in Beijing
Dana Romanoff (Finalist)	USA	Africa	2006	Inge Morath Award	Wife of the God
Zeid Romdhane	Tunisia	Tunisia	2015	Arab Documentary Photography Program	West of Life
Roy Saade	Lebanon	Lebanon	2016	Arab Documentary Photography Program	Dalieh; On the Edge
Mustafa Saeede	Somalia	Somalia	2015	Arab Documentary Photography Program	Division Multiplied
Muhammad Salah	Sudan	Sudan	2016	Arab Documentary Photography Program	Who Said White Is Better?
Sara Sallam	Egypt	Egypt	2016	Arab Documentary Photography Program	Hide and Seek
Zara Samiry	Morocco	Morocco	2014	Arab Documentary Photography Program	Tales of the Moroccan Amazons
Alessandra Sanguinetti	USA	Argentina	2017	Magnum Foundation Fund	El Deslinde
Cinthya Santos Briones	Mexico	USA	2016	Magnum Foundation Fellowship	
Emily Schiffer	USA	USA	2009	Inge Morath Award	Cheyenne River (Winner)
Emily Schiffer	USA	Chicago	2011	Magnum Foundation Fund	Securing Food in Chicagoland
Mimi Schiffman	USA	USA	2012	Magnum Foundation Fellowship	
Alex Scott	USA	USA	2015	Magnum Foundation Fellowship	
Pedro Silveira	Brazil		2014	Photography and Social Justice	
Alice Smeets (Finalist)	Belgium	Haiti	2008	Inge Morath Award	Growing Up in Haiti
Prasiit Sthapit	Nepal	Nepal	2016	Magnum Foundation Fund	Change of Course
Brock Stoneham	USA	USA	2014	Magnum Foundation Fellowship	Recycled
Pooyan Tabatabaei	Iran		2012	Photography and Social Justice	
Shannon Taggart (Finalist)	USA	USA	2005	Inge Morath Award	The Spiritualists
Nic Tanner		USA	2014	Magnum Foundation Fellowship	
Newsha Tavakolian (Finalist)	Iran	Iran	2007	Inge Morath Award	Iran, Girl Power!
Ian Teh	UK	China	2014	China File/Abigail Cohen Fellow	
Ian Teh	UK	China	2011	Magnum Foundation Fund	Traces
Larry Towell	Canada	Afghanistan	2010	Magnum Foundation Fund	Crisis in Afghanistan
Sumeja Tulic	Bosnia	USA	2016	Magnum Foundation Fellowship	Undocumented Recipes
Sumeja Tulic	Bosnia		2014	Photography and Social Justice	
Angelos Tzortzinis	Greece	Greece	2016	Magnum Foundation Fund	In Search of The European Dream
Shehab Uddin	Bangladesh	Bangladesh	2010	Magnum Foundation Fund	Pavement Dwellers
Sofia Valiente (Finalist)	USA	USA	2015	Inge Morath Award	Miracle Village
Peter Van Agtmael	USA	USA	2015	Magnum Foundation Fund	Untitled
Tomas Van Houtryve	Belgium	North Korea	2011	Magnum Foundation Fund	Borderline: In the Shadow of North Korea
Kadir van Lohuizen	Netherlands	Iraq	2010	Magnum Foundation Fund	The Last 50,000 U.S. Soldiers
Danielle Villasana (Winner)	USA	Peru	2015	Inge Morath Award	A Light Inside
Ami Vitale (Winner)	USA	Kashmir	2002	Inge Morath Award	Kashmir
Anastasia Vlasova	Ukraine	Ukraine	2016	What Works	Homeland in Exile
Anastasia Vlasova	Ukraine		2015	Photography and Social Justice	
Teun Voeten	Netherlands	Mexico	2011	Magnum Foundation Fund	Narco Estado
Donald Weber	Canada	Iraq	2012	Magnum Foundation Fund	War is Good*
Alex Welsh	USA	USA	2013	Magnum Foundation Fund	Home of the Brave
Christian Werner	Germany	Balkan Region	2014	Magnum Foundation Fund	Depleted Uranium: The Silent Genocide
Danny Wilcox Frazier	USA	USA	2016	Magnum Foundation Fund	Bury Me Not on the Lone Prairie
Muyi Xiao	China	USA	2016	What Works	Talk 2 Muslims
Muyi Xiao	China		2015	Photography and Social Justice	
Carmen Yahchouchi	Lebanon	Lebanon	2016	Arab Documentary Photography Program	Beyond Sacrifice
Yeong-Ung Yang	South Korea	USA	2013	Magnum Foundation Fellowship	
Sim Chi Yin	Singapore		2010	Photography and Social Justice	
Wang Yishu	China	China	2010	Magnum Foundation Fund	Substitute Teacher
Daniella Zalcman (Winner)	USA	Canada/USA	2016	Inge Morath Award	Signs of Your Identity
Zalmai	Afghanistan	Greece	2011	Magnum Foundation Fund	Walking in Quicksand
Carlotta Zarattini (Finalist)	Italy	Cambodia	2012	Inge Morath Award	The White Building: A Mirror of Cambodia
Lijie Zhang	China		2013	Photography and Social Justice	
Emine Ziyatdinova	Ukraine	USA	2012	Magnum Foundation Fellowship	
