= Eric Gyamfi =

Ghanaian photographer

- Born: 1990 (age 35–36)
- Education: University of Ghana
- Known for: Photography
- Awards: Foam Paul Huf Award; 2019 Fixing Shadows; Julius and I

Eric Gyamfi (born 1990) is a Ghanaian photographer, living in Accra and has held exhibitions in Mampɔn Akuapem, London, Amsterdam, Accra, Vienna, Berlin, Tamale, New York, Cape Town and Bamako.

Gyamfi's work explores the poetics of queerness in his home country and within the photographic medium

== Early life and education ==
Gyamfi holds a B.A in Information studies with Economics from the University of Ghana (2010 to 2014) and an MFA from the Department of painting and sculpture, Kwame Nkrumah University of Science and Technology (2018- 2024). Gyamfi was also a fellow at the Photographers’ Master Class (Khartoum, Sudan 2016 and Nairobi, Kenya 2017, Johannesburg, South Africa 2018), after a brief apprenticeship with Ghanaian photographer Francis Nii Obodai Provençal. He also participated in the Nuku Studio Photography Workshops (2016) and World Press Photo West African Master Class (2017), both in Accra.

== Life and work ==
The series Just Like Us documents queer individuals and communities in Ghana, "to show queer people exist and that they are like anyone else." Made in black and white, the photographs as described by Ekow Eshun in The Guardian, are "an intimate evocation of everyday life, titled with studied plainness: Ama and Shana at lunch; Kwasi at Kokrobite beach; Atsu during dance; Kwasi in bed. When queerness is regarded as the opposite of normality, the answer, suggests Gyamfi, is to insist on the very ordinariness of the people being documented and in so doing declare them as individually complex as everyone else." His work has been featured in A Diagnosis of Time: Unlearn What You Have Learned (Red Clay Studio, Tamale, Ghana 2021), Ecologies and Politics of the Living (Vienna Biennale, 2021), The 11th and 12th Bamako Encounters (Musée National du Mali/Mémorial Modibo Kéita, 2017/2019), Fixing Shadows: Julius and I (FOAM, 2019/2020, Autograph, 2023), the 74th Berlinale International Film Festival (Forum Expanded, Betonhalle, Silent Green, Arsenal —Institute for Film and Video Art– 1& 2, 2024), The New York African Film Festival (Brooklyn Academy of Music 2023, The Africa Center 2024), Punya 2.0 (Kunsthallbern, Switzerland, 2024), Kɔηsεt Pāti (Accra, Ghana, 2025) and others

== Awards ==
- 2016: Magnum Foundation Emergency Fund grant, Magnum Photos for Just Like Us
- 2019: Foam Paul Huf Award from Foam Fotografiemuseum Amsterdam, a £20,000 award, for all his work to date, including Fixing Shadows; Julius and I
