= Justyna Mielnikiewicz =

Polish photographer

Justyna Mielnikiewicz is a Polish photographer, based in Tbilisi, Georgia. She works as a documentary photographer and on long-term personal projects about post-Soviet states. She has published Woman with a Monkey (2014) and Ukraine Runs Through It (2019). She won the W. Eugene Smith Grant in 2016.

== Early life and education ==
Mielnikiewicz was born in Poland. She earned a Master's degree from Jagiellonian University in Krakow, Poland in 1998 for the "Science of Culture at New Media and Culture Management".

== Work ==
Mielnikiewicz is a self-taught photographer. Beginning work as a photojournalist for the Polish newspaper Gazeta Wyborcza from 1999, she then moved to Georgia (in the South Caucasus) in 2001. She based herself in Tbilisi from 2002 and works as a freelance documentary photographer and on personal, long-term projects about post-Soviet states. The first conflict she covered was the 2008 Russo-Georgian War.

Her decade-long project Woman with a Monkey (2014) is a collection of stories and photographs from the South Caucasus. "Pictures of lovers and celebrations flow into scenes of loss and war, black and white moves seamlessly to color. Pages of thick paper stock unfold to reveal handwritten captions, and small texts written by Mielnikiewicz are scattered throughout. Longer stories written by her husband Paul appear as type-written entries—like a letter from an old friend."

Following the 2014 annexation of Crimea by the Russian Federation, her long-term project Ukraine Runs Through It (2019) documents the political divide along the Dnieper river. The Dnieper is the main river in Ukraine, slicing the country into two parts—east and west—as it flows roughly north to south. As described in National Geographic, for Mielnikiewicz "it's a metaphor for modern Ukraine, a country split along historical and ideological divides: on one side, those aligned with the pro-Western ideas of democracy and on the other, those aligned with Russia" "The stories she has gathered illustrate the complex patchwork of histories, ethnicities, and experiences that make up modern Ukraine, and Mielnikiewicz is careful to point out that the current struggles fall along different versions of history and statehood, rather than along ethnic lines."

She won the W. Eugene Smith Grant in 2016 for "a new project that explores the role of ethnicity in identity formation for Russians residing in former Soviet states, twenty-five years after the fall of the Soviet Union."

== Personal life ==
As of 2014, Mielnikiewicz was married and has a daughter.

== Publications ==
=== Books by Mielnikiewicz ===
- Woman with a Monkey: Caucasus in Short Notes and Photographs. 2014. OCLC 904407935.
- Ukraine Runs Through It. Self-published; Poznań, Poland: Pix.house, 2019. Photographs and stories by Mielnikiewicz. ISBN 978-83-952480-6-1. Edition of 500 copies.

=== Publications with contributions by Mielnikiewicz ===
- At the Border. [Warsaw]: Sputnik Photos, 2008. ISBN 978-83-927485-0-2. Photographs by Andrej Balco, Jan Brykczyński, Manca Juvan, Mielnikiewicz, Rafał Milach, Domen Pal, Agnieszka Rayss and Filip Singer; texts in English. The untitled preface says that the book "describes the illegal labour markets in the new member states of the European Union (Poland, Slovakia and Slovenia)."
- U. [Warsaw]: Sputnik Photos, 2010. ISBN 978-83-927485-1-9. Photographs by Jan Brykczyński, Andrej Balco, Andrei Liankevich, Agnieszka Rayss, Rafał Milach, Filip Singer, Ivan Kurinnoy, Janis Pipars and Mielnikiewicz. With short texts in English by Serhiy Zhadan, Irena Karpa, and the photographers. "Photos taken in Ukraine in 2008–2010"; "the non-profit organization Altemus commissioned a team of young East European photographers from Sputnik Photos collective and Ukrainian writers, to travel the country and capture its ethos". Edition of 300 copies.
- Stand By = Ӡа Беларусь. Warsaw: Sputnik Photos, 2012. ISBN 978-83-927485-5-7. Photographs of Belarus by Jan Brykczyński, Andrei Liankevich, Manca Juvan, Rafał Milach, Mielnikiewicz, Adam Pańczuk and Agnieszka Rayss. With text by Victor Martinovich in English and Belarusian. Edition of 1000 copies.

== Awards ==
- Winner, Canon Female Photojournalist Grant, Canon Inc.
- 2009: 2nd prize, People in the News, Stories, World Press Photo for work made during the 2008 Russo-Georgian War
- 2014: 2015 Aftermath Project Grant. A $20,000 USD award.
- 2016: W. Eugene Smith Grant from the W. Eugene Smith Memorial Fund. A $30,000 USD award.

== Exhibitions ==
- The Meaning of a Nation – Russia and its Neighbours: Georgia and Ukraine, Cortona on the Move festival, Cortona, Italy, 2017
