= Lu Guang (photographer) =

Chinese photojournalist

Lu Guang (Chinese: 卢广; Traditional: 盧廣; born 1961) is a Chinese independent photojournalist. His work consists of large documentary projects on social, environmental, and economic issues, exposing the lives of "people on the margins of Chinese society: coal miners, drug addicts, HIV patients." His stories on pollution and environmental destruction cover topics traditionally under-reported due to the risk of punishment by the Chinese government.

He has received three World Press Photo awards, the Henri Nannen Prize for photojournalism, the W. Eugene Smith Grant, a photography grant from the National Geographic, and the Prince Claus Award.

Lu is based in New York City, the first Chinese photographer to be invited by the U.S. State Department as a visiting scholar, and Beijing. In early November 2018, whilst travelling in Xinjiang, he was taken away by state security agents. He was released in 2019.

== Life and work ==
Lu was born in 1961 in the city of Yongkang in the Zhejiang province of China. He grew up under Mao Zedong's policies in the People's Republic of China.

In 1980, Lu encountered photography while working in a silk factory in Yongkang. From 1987 until 1993, he ran his own photo studio. Later, he studied photography at the Fine Arts Academy of Tsinghua University (Beijing) from 1993 to 1995. He worked for several years on advertising assignments before going freelance as a reportage photographer. During his years of study at Tsinghua University, Lu encountered Xie Hailong, another Chinese photographer, from whom he gained inspiration to become a photojournalist.

Lu's work covers a wide range of consequences of China's rapid industrialization. A reoccurring theme is that of "cancer villages" in certain affected provinces, the negative environmental conditions (such as water pollution) causing these cancer villages and other related health issues, and the effect of industrialization on Chinese countrysides and its people. Lu has stated that his choice of subject in his photography is done to raise awareness in both China and on a global scale.

Shanxi province is the setting for a photograph within the series capturing severe birth defects present in the children living there. The province is also one of the most polluted areas in China. Beyond the Yellow River, Lu also documented pollution in the Yangtze River and the Qiantang River, with leaking sewage from the industrial districts. Heavy sewage and air pollution in Anyang City of Henan province is shown negatively affecting the lives of villagers.

His projects have included one on AIDS in the Chinese province of Henan as well as Pollution in China, Gold Rush, Drug Girl, and Development and Pollution.

Lu's photographs have been published in the National Geographic, The Guardian, and by Greenpeace. He lives in New York. Because of his reporting on social issues, Lu has faced attempts to stop his work.

Lu is based in New York City, the first Chinese photographer to be invited by the U.S. State Department as a visiting scholar, and Beijing.

In early November 2018, whilst travelling in Xinjiang, Lu was taken away by state security agents. A restrictive security regime with re-education camps for the predominantly Muslim ethnic Uyghurs and Kazakhs is in place in the region. Amnesty International is concerned Lu's detention may relate to this situation in the region and has called on the Chinese government to "release him immediately", and Human Rights Watch has called on it to "immediately confirm and clarify" his "whereabouts and well-being".

In September 2019, Lu's wife Xu Xiaoli published on Twitter that Lu had been home for a few months.

== Awards ==
- 2004: First Prize, World Press Photo, Contemporary Issues category, for a story about Henan province peasants who had been infected with HIV after selling their blood.
- 2008: Henri Nannen Prize for photojournalism from Gruner + Jahr.
- 2009: $30,000 W. Eugene Smith Grant in Humanistic Photography from the W. Eugene Smith Memorial Fund for his project Pollution in China.
- 2010: Photography grant from National Geographic to support a project documenting pollution in China and its impact on people's lives.
- 2011: Third Prize, World Press Photo, Spot News category.
- 2013: Prince Claus Award.
- 2015: Third Prize, World Press Photo, Long-Term Projects category for his project Development and Pollution in China.

== Exhibitions ==
- 2017: Development and Pollution, Visa pour l'Image, Perpignan, France
