= Lalo de Almeida =

Brazilian photographer (born 1970)

- Born: 1970 (age 55–56)
- Education: Istituto Europeo di Design, Milan
- Known for: Photography
- Notable work: "Amazonian Dystopia"
- Awards: W. Eugene Smith Grant; 2021
- Website: lalodealmeida.com.br

Lalo de Almeida (born 1970) is a Brazilian documentary photographer based in São Paulo. He has been co-winner of the W. Eugene Smith Grant and has twice won first prize awards in the World Press Photo Contest.

== Life and work ==
Almeida studied photography at the Istituto Europeo di Design in Milan, Italy. Since the late 1990s, he has worked in Brazil for the daily newspaper Folha de S.Paulo and since 2005 for The New York Times. Since 2020, he has been represented by Panos Pictures. His long-term project Amazonian Dystopia is about the destruction of the Amazon rainforest, by logging, gold mining and hydroelectric power generation, under the presidency of Jair Bolsonaro.

== Publications ==
- Nas Asas do Correio Aéreo: a rota do Tocantins = Flying with the airmail service. São Paulo: Metalivros, 2002. ISBN 978-8585371449. Edited by Isio Bacaleinick and with text by Tânia Carvalho. Brazilian Portuguese-language edition.

== Short video documentaries ==
- A World of Walls
- The Battle of Belo Monte
- The Climate Crisis

== Awards ==
- 2017: 2nd prize, Contemporary Issues category, World Press Photo Contest, Amsterdam, Netherlands for "Victims of the Zika Virus"
- 2021: 1st Prize, Environment category, World Press Photo Contest, Amsterdam, Netherlands for "Pantanal Ablaze"
- 2021: Co-winner, W. Eugene Smith Grant from the W. Eugene Smith Memorial Fund, USA for Amazonian Dystopia. A $10,000 grant.
- 2022: Overall winner, Long-Term Projects category, World Press Photo Contest, Amsterdam, Netherlands for Amazonian Dystopia
