= Rahima Gambo =

Nigerian photographer and artist

- Awards: Contemporary African Photography Prize 2020

Rahima Gambo is a multidisciplinary artist based between London, UK and Abuja, Nigeria.

== Early life and career ==
Gambo graduated from Columbia Graduate School of Journalism. Later in 2014 she started a fellowship at Magnum Foundation Her early work Tatsuniya 2017 - ongoing) a photography and film series takes place at Shehu Sanda Kyarimi school, Maiduguri, Nigeria became widely known for extending a collaboration with students of the school who perform in the series.

== Work ==
Rahima Gambo is an artist who explores the conceptual territories between photography, moving image and installation as it intersects with documentary, biography and place. Her process-driven practice is often circular and serial, where repetition and return to sites of interest are essential.

Selected solo and group exhibitions include Diriyah Biennale (2026) Gasworks London (2024) Liverpool Biennale (2023) Kunsthalle Bern (2022), Stevenson Gallery (2022), Rencontres de la Photographie, Arles (2022), Biennale Mercosur, Porto Alegre, Brazil (2020), and the 11th and 12th editions of Rencontres de Bamako, Mali (2017-2019), Have you seen a Horizon Lately? MACAAL, Morocco, “Resisting Images, Images Responding” at Coalmine, Winterthur, Switzerland, Mercosur Biennial, 12th edition—Feminine(s): visualities, actions and affections, “Afterglow” Yokohama Triennale 2020, Lagos Biennale 2019. “Diaspora at Home” curated by KADIST and the Centre for Contemporary Art in Lagos, Nigeria.
