= Adriana Loureiro Fernández =

Adriana Loureiro Fernández is a photojournalist reporting from Venezuela. Her work focuses on political and environmental changes occurring in Venezuela, social conflict, and migration.

== Early life and education ==
Born in Caracas, Venezuela, in 1988, Loureiro Fernández received a master’s degree in journalism from Columbia University in 2017.

== Career ==
In recent years, Loureiro Fernández has received professional recognition as a photojournalist, receiving a Remi Ochlik Award at Visa Pour L’Image in 2019, a W. Eugene Smith Grant in 2024, and honorable mention for the Anja Niedringhaus Courage In Photojournalism Award in 2025. She was also shortlisted for the Leica Oskar Barnack Award and Picture of the Year International. Loureiro Fernández’s work has appeared in international publications, such as The New York Times, Los Angeles Times, Der Spiegel, and Bloomberg Businessweek.
