= Rania Matar =

Lebanese/Palestinian/American documentary, portrait and fine art photographer

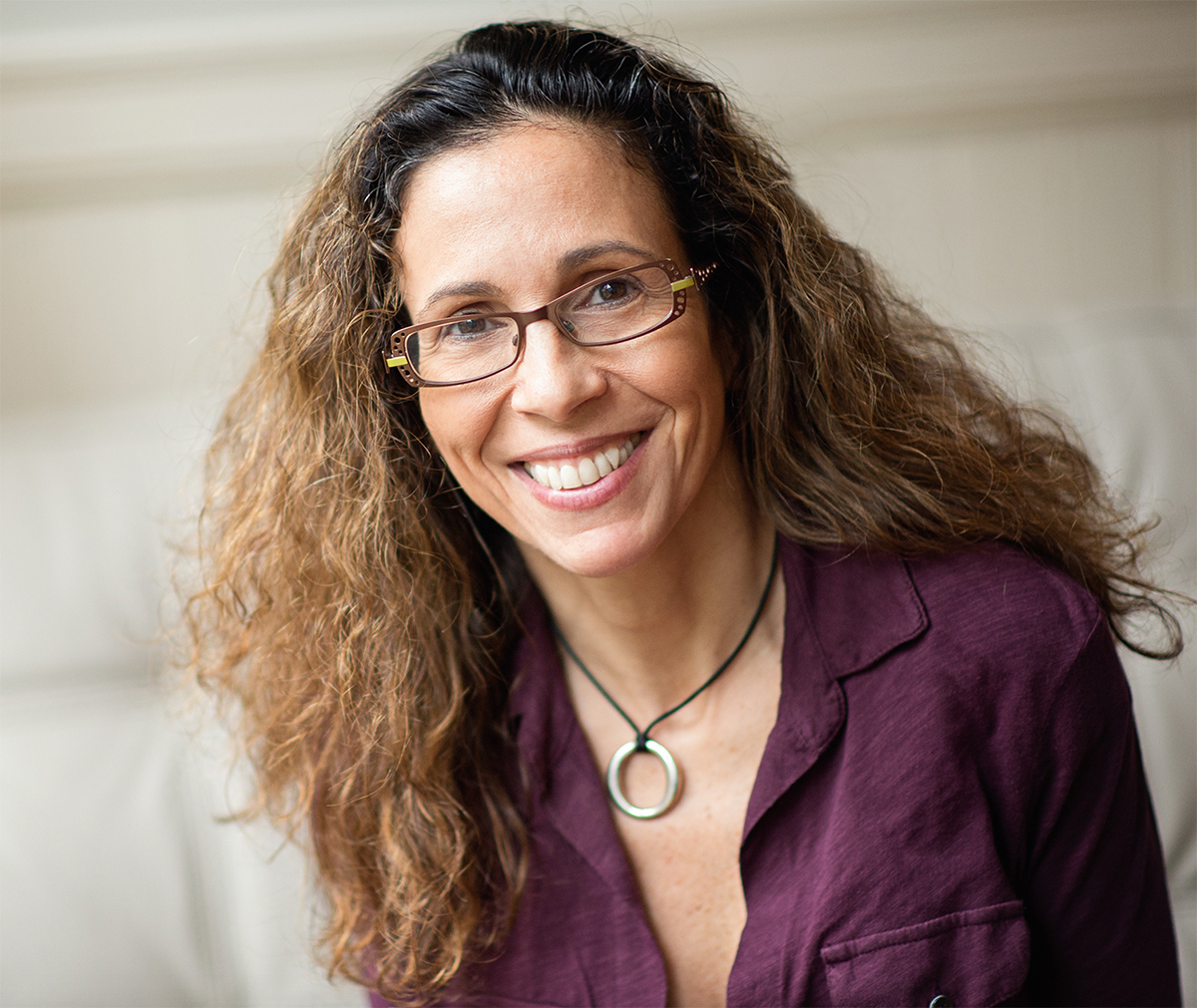
- Born: 1964 (age 61–62); Lebanon
- Education: American University of Beirut, Cornell University
- Known for: Fine art photography
- Website: www.raniamatar.com

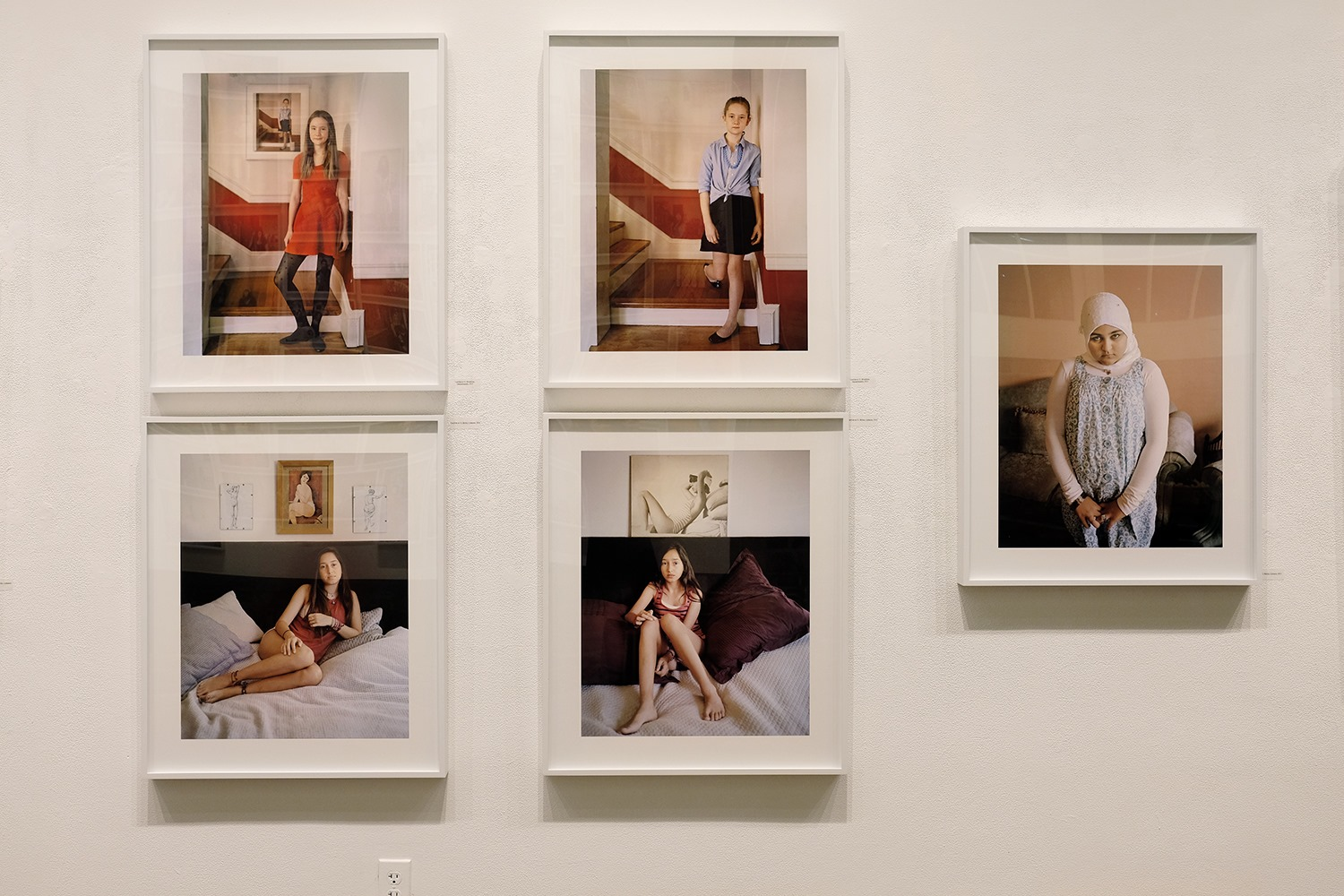
Becoming at RayKo Photo Center, San Francisco

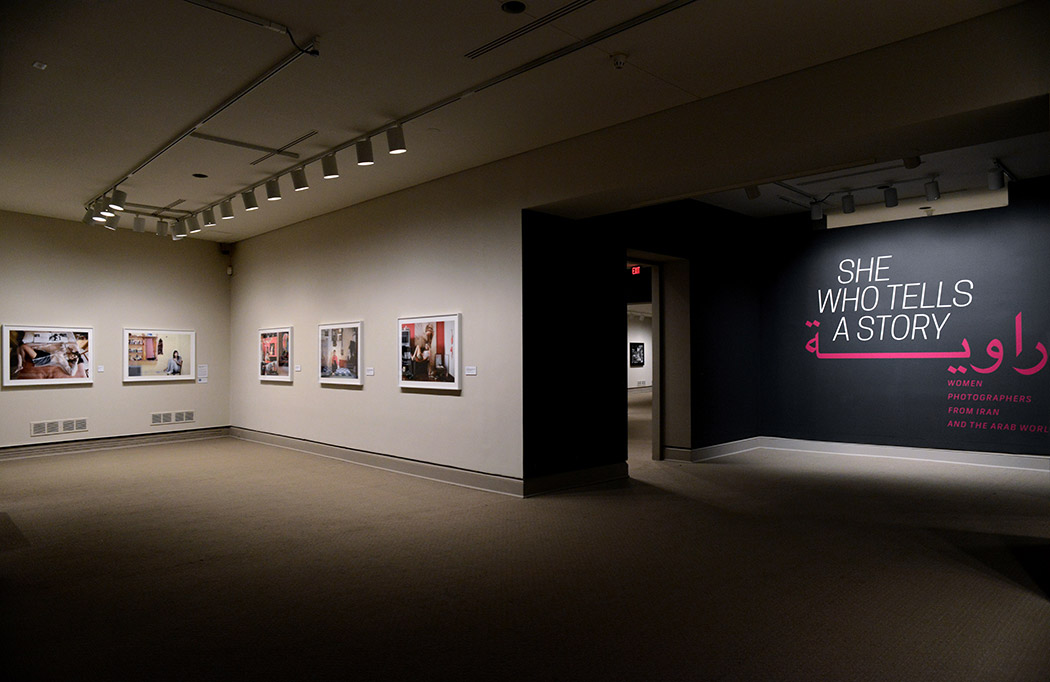
She Who Tells a Story exhibited at National Museum of Women in the Arts

Rania Matar (born 1964) is a Lebanese/Palestinian/American documentary, portrait and fine art photographer. She photographs the daily lives of girls and women in the Middle East and in the United States, including Syrian refugees.

== Early life ==
Matar was born and raised in Lebanon and moved to the U.S. in 1984. Originally trained as an architect at the American University of Beirut and at Cornell University, she later studied photography at the New England School of Photography and the Maine Photographic Workshops. Since 2009 she has taught photographic workshops for teenage girls in Lebanon’s refugee camps. She now teaches at the Massachusetts College of Art and Design and exhibits her work worldwide.

== Career ==
Matar has made several series of photographs, including SHE, L'Enfant Femme, Unspoken Conversations, Women Coming of Age, A Girl and Her Room, Invisible Children, and Ordinary Lives. Her portraits explore gender studies and often consider varying national identities. L'Enfant Femme depicts preteen girls living in the United States and the Middle East, and focuses on documenting the age between childhood and maturity. Mothers and daughters are photographed together and present a universal nature of womanhood in the series Unspoken Conversations. Matar began her series Invisible Children after a visit to Beirut in 2014. She noticed how many Syrian refugee children were on the streets begging for work and money. This series documents the individuality of each child. In 2017, Matar's work was included in the Biennale of the Contemporary Arab World held in Paris at the Arab World Institute.

== Publications ==
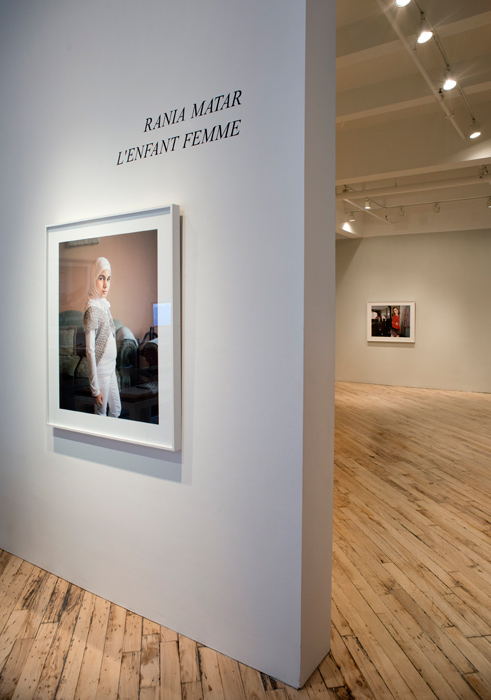
L'Enfant-Femme at Carroll and Sons

- Ordinary Lives (2009). With an essay by Anthony Shadid. Selected as best photo book of 2009 by Photo-Eye Magazine.
- A Girl and Her Room (2012). With essays by Anne Wilkes Tucker and Susan Minot. Selected as best photo book of 2012 by PDN, Photo-Eye, British Journal of Photography, Feature Shoot and L'Oeil de la Photographie.
- L'Enfant-Femme (2016). With an introduction by Queen Noor of Jordan, and essays by Lois Lowry and Kristen Gresh. Selected as best photo book of 2016 by PDN Magazine and Foto Infinitum, and was a Staff Pick by The Christian Science Monitor.
- SHE (2021). Published by Radius Books with essays by Orin Zahra and Mark Alice Durant.

== Awards ==
- 2018: Guggenheim Fellowship, Photography, John Simon Guggenheim Memorial Foundation
- 2021: Massachusetts Cultural Council Artist Fellowship
- 2022: Leica Women Foto Project Award Winner
