= Xyza Cruz Bacani =

Filipina photographer

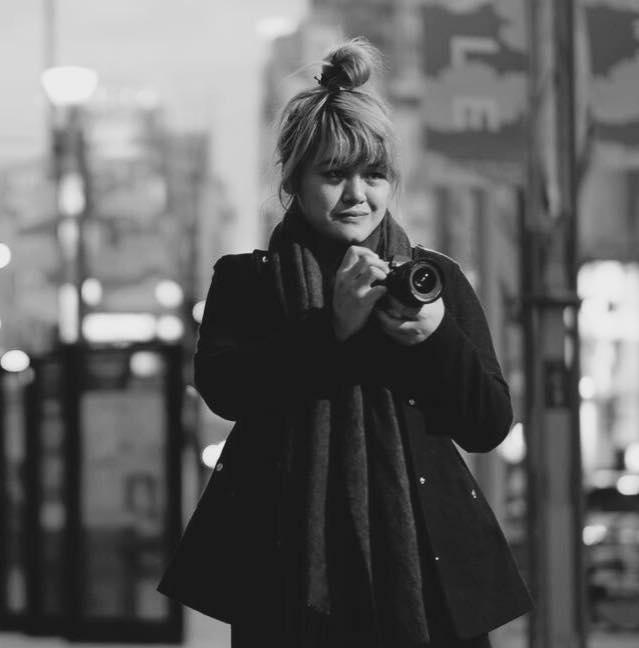
- Born: 1987 (age 38–39)
- Occupation: Street photographer

Xyza Cruz Bacani (born 1987) is a Filipina artist and documentary photographer. She is known for her black-and-white photographs of Hong Kong and documentary projects about migration and the intersections of labor and human rights. She is one of the Magnum Foundation's Human Rights Fellows and is the recipient of a resolution passed by the Philippines House of Representatives in her honor, HR No. 1969. Xyza is one of the BBC’s 100 Women of the World 2015, 30 Under 30 Women Photographers 2016, Forbes 30 Under 30 Asia 2016, and a Fujifilm Ambassador. She is the recipient of grants from Pulitzer Center on Crisis Reporting 2016, WMA Commission 2017, and part of Open Society Foundations Moving Walls 24.

== Early life ==
Bacani grew up in Bambang, Nueva Vizcaya, the eldest of three children. She studied for a bachelor's degree in nursing at Saint Mary's University in Bayombong before dropping out and leaving the Philippines to raise funds for the education of her siblings.

== Career ==
At the age of 19, she joined her mother in Hong Kong, working as a nanny for an affluent family in the Mid-Levels. Bacani started taking casual photographs after purchasing her first digital single-lens reflex camera with a loan from her employer. Her interest in photography developed while she was still in college, but she was unable to afford her own camera at the time. She is now a full time photographer working on various under reported projects around the world.

== Works ==
Among her various street photography images of Hong Kong society, she has covered the 2014 Hong Kong protests in Central and documented the lives of other domestic helpers at Bethune House Migrant Women's Refuge in Jordan, Hong Kong.

Her work has drawn comparisons to those taken by American street photographer Vivian Maier, who had also worked as a nanny; however, Bacani dismisses the comparison, wanting her work to stand on its own.

== Exhibitions ==
- Nov 2014 – Philippine Consulate General, Hong Kong
- Dec 2014 – Foreign Correspondents' Club, Hong Kong

== Magnum Foundation Human Rights Fellowship ==
In 2015, Xyza won the prestigious Magnum Foundation Human Rights scholarship to New York University, which will pay for her to enroll in the Tisch School for the Arts six-week photography course. She then obtained her MA in Arts Politics from NYU in 2022, despite a lack of an undergraduate degree.
