= Daniella Zalcman =

American photographer (born 1986)

- Born: 1986
- Alma mater: Columbia University
- Occupation: Freelance journalist, photojournalist
- Employer: Tulane University
- Website: www.dan.iella.net/about

Daniella Zalcman (born 1986) is a Vietnamese-American documentary photographer whose work often addresses the history and impact of western colonization. Her works include Signs of Your Identity, a series of portraits which documents survivors of Canadian residential schools. This exhibition has received multiple awards, including the Inge Morath Award. The accompanying book Signs of Your Identity (2016) received the 2016 FotoEvidence Book Award. Her work is included in the permanent collection at the Museum of Fine Arts, Houston.

In 2017, Zalcman launched Women Photograph, an international US-based non-profit supporting women and nonbinary visual journalists. Zalcman has co-edited Women Photograph's first published book, What we see : women & nonbinary perspectives (2023). Zalcman is a co-author of the Photo Bill of Rights.

== Early life and education ==
Zalcman was born in Washington, D.C. and is of part-Vietnamese ancestry. She wanted to become a journalist from a young age. While still a student at Columbia University, Zalcman wrote for the college newspaper and began to freelance for the New York Daily News. She graduated from Columbia in 2009 with a degree in architecture.

== Career ==
Zalcman went on to work as a daily assignment photographer for the New York Daily News and then The Wall Street Journal. Her photographs have appeared widely, in publications including TIME, Sports Illustrated, Vanity Fair, Smithsonian Magazine, Mashable and others.

=== New York + London ===
In 2012, Zalcman moved from New York City to London, England. At this time she created a series of double exposures overlaying New York and London. Informal images taken with her iPhone were then "beautifully composed" to take advantage of negative space, colour and contrast, creating “imaginary landscapes”. She published a limited run Photo Book of 100 images, New York + London: A Collection Of Double Exposures.

=== Signs of Your Identity ===
Zalcman's body of work Signs of Your Identity documents the history and impact of Canadian residential schools on people who were forcibly removed from their homes as children, and placed in coercive assimilation educational systems. Residential schools operated in both the U.S. and Canada. Zalcman became aware of this history during a trip to British Columbia, Saskatchewan, and Ontario in 2014, while researching abnormally high HIV rates in Indigenous communities.

Unsatisfied with her initial photographs, Zalcman returned in 2015 and interviewed 45 individuals in the province of Saskatchewan. In her resulting works, Zalcman overlays portraits of residential school survivors in a double exposure suggestive of their memories, adding an “extra layer of storytelling". An accompanying published book used transparent pages to place the secondary image over the original portrait, allowing the viewer to see both versions. This work was supported by the Pulitzer Center on Crisis Reporting, and has received multiple awards. The book “Signs of Your Identity” (2016) won the FotoEvidence Book Award and was considered one of the Best Photobooks of 2016 by Sara Terry of Photo-Eye.

"Zalcman’s multiple exposure black-and-white portraits of native Canadian survivors of residential schools are layered with images that evoke the dislocation and cultural and physical violence of their shared past. We are pleased to be able to recognize Zalcman’s creative approach to addressing memory and trauma."-Kristen Lubben, Magnum Foundation

=== Women Photograph ===
In 2017, Zalcman founded Women Photograph, a US-based non-profit working internationally to support the presence of women and nonbinary people in visual journalism. Statistics suggest that between 85 and 89.1 per cent of photojournalists are men. Women Photograph's website includes a hiring database of more than 1,300 independent women and nonbinary photographers from more than 110 countries, enabling employers to draw on a more diverse population of photojournalists. The project offers opportunities for skill-building, mentorship and some forms of financial support such as travel. They also track and publish metrics such as the percentage of front-page images by photographer's gender across eight international papers.

Women Photograph's first published book, What we see : women & nonbinary perspectives (2023), was co-curated by Zalcman and Sara Ickow from the International Center of Photography (ICP) in New York. The book features 100 photographs by women and gender-diverse photographers such as Lynsey Addario, Paula Bronstein, Jess T. Dugan, Lola Flash, Nada Harib and Yumna Al-Arashi. Photographs are grouped into four chapters – Identity, Place, Conflict and Reclamation – and illustrate diverse perspectives from international women photographers. Each photograph is accompanied by a short text from its photographer. The book was a 2023 Foreword INDIES Book of the Year Bronze Award Winner for Women's Studies and for Photography.

=== Further activities ===
Zalcman has been a visiting professor at Wake Forest University (2018-2020) and the University of Montana (T. Anthony Pollner Distinguished Professor, 2022). As of 2023, Zalcman became a Professor of Practice at Tulane University in New Orleans. As part of her work at Tulane, she curated Việt Nam in New Orleans, presented as part of CatchLight's Night of Photojournalism U.S. tour.

Zalcman has received grants from the National Geographic Society and the Pulitzer Center on Crisis Reporting. She is an International Women's Media Foundation fellow and a Global Catchlight Fellow.

Zalcman is a co-founder of the affinity groups Indigenous Photograph and We, Women and a member of Diversify Photo and the Authority Collective. She has served on the board of trustees of the W. Eugene Smith Memorial Fund (2017-2023), the board of directors of the ACOS Alliance (2018-2023), the board of governors of the Overseas Press Club (2021-2025), and the board of directors of the New Orleans Photo Alliance (2025–present).

== Awards and honors ==
- 2016, Inge Morath Award, Magnum Foundation
- 2016, FotoEvidence Book Award
- 2016, Bright Spark Award, Magenta Foundation
- 2017, Arnold Newman Prize, Arnold & Augusta Newman Foundation
- 2017, Robert F. Kennedy Journalism Award for Photography – International
- 2017, Open Society Moving Walls Grantee, Open Society Foundations, New York
- 2021, CatchLight Fellow
- 2023, Foreword INDIES Book of the Year Bronze Award Winner for Women's Studies and for Photography

== Selected publications ==
- Zalcman, Daniella (2016). Signs of your identity (1st ed.). Brooklyn, NY: FotoEvidence Press. ISBN 9780996391221.
- Zalcman, Daniella; Ickow, Sara, eds. (2023). What we see: women & nonbinary perspectives through the lens. London: White Lion Publishing. ISBN 9780711278547.
