= Balazs Gardi =

Hungarian-American photographer

- Balázs Gárdi
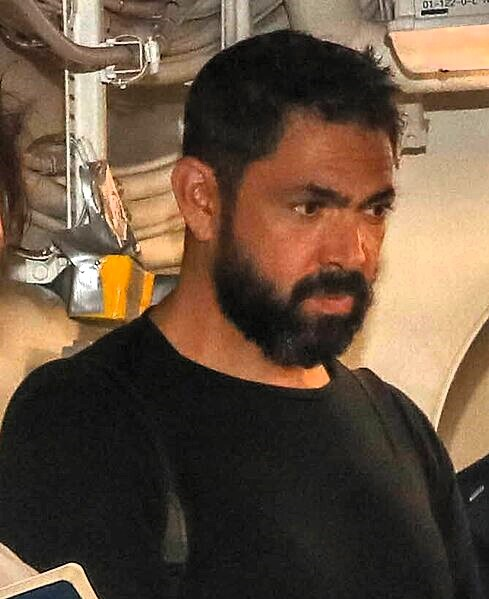
- Gardi on the USS Rafael Peralta in 2023
- Born: 1975 (age 50–51); Budapest, Hungary
- Education: MÚOSZ Journalism School
- Website: balazsgardi.com

Balazs Gardi (born 1975) is a Hungarian-American photographer. Gardi photographed the landscape of the war in Afghanistan over a two decade period. Gardi has travelled to dozens of countries to survey and photograph the consequences of the global water crisis.

In 2008, Gardi received two 1st Prizes in the World Press Photo Awards and won the Photojournalism prize in the Bayeux-Calvados Award for War Correspondents for his work from Afghanistan.

== Photography career ==
Gardi started working as a photographer for the daily newspaper Népszabadság around 2000. In the mid-2000s, he spent two years documenting the Roma (Gypsy) minorities, photographing the often impoverished and discriminated peoples throughout a dozen Eastern European countries. His photographs have appeared publications including Harper's Magazine, National Geographic, The New York Times, Wired, Time, Outside, The Atlantic, Newsweek, and The Guardian.

Gardi's series titled "Thirst," depicts human civilization in water stressed areas. The Thirst series is part of Facing Water Crisis, Gardi's project documenting the impact of human population growth on water scarcity.

In 2010 and 2011, he documented the First Battalion, Eighth Marines, throughout their deployment in southern Afghanistan's war-torn deserts. In Afghanistan, Gardi also experimented with using an iPhone as his primary camera, publishing a photo essay in Foreign Policy titled "The War in Hipstamatic".

In 2011, Gardi travelled to rural KwaZulu-Natal Province of South Africa to document the communities who live there. His work there was supported by a Magnum Foundation Fund grant.

The Storm, a body of work Gardi created during the aftermath of the 2020 U.S. presidential election working alongside writer Luke Mogelson for The New Yorker, was a finalist for the 11th cycle of Prix Pictet Award.

== Exhibitions ==
Solo exhibitions of Gardi’s work have been held at the European Parliament, Brussels (2005); DokuFoto, Prizren (2007 and 2008); The New York Photo Festival (2011); and Roca Gallery, Barcelona (2015). Gardi has also participated in group exhibitions at venues including Museum of Fine Arts, Budapest (2008); Les Invalides, Paris (2009); Noorderlicht Gallery, Groningen (2008 and 2010); The Annenberg Space for Photography, Los Angeles (2009); The Museum of Fine Arts, Houston, Texas (2012) and Saatchi Gallery, London (2022).

== Awards ==
Gardi has received grants and fellowships from the Alexia Foundation, INK, Magnum Foundation, Reuters Foundation, World Press Photo Foundation and Getty Images. He is the recipient of the Bayeux-Calvados Award for War Correspondents, in 2008; the Global Vision Award at Pictures of the Year International in 2009 and three first prizes at World Press Photo.
