= Far North (Russia) =

Geographical region of Russia located mainly north of the Arctic Circle

The Extreme North Territories equated to the Extreme North

The Extreme North (Note: Russian: Крайний Север, romanized: Krajnij Sever, IPA: [ˈkrajnʲɪj ˈsʲevʲɪr]) or the Far North (Note: Russian: Дальний Север, romanized: Daljnij Sever, IPA: [ˈdalʲnʲɪj ˈsʲevʲɪr]) is a large part of Russia located mainly north of the Arctic Circle and boasting enormous mineral and natural resources. Its total area, mostly within Siberia, is about 5,500,000 square kilometres (2,100,000 mi^{2}), comprising about one-third of Russia's total area. Formally, the regions of the Extreme North comprise the whole of Chukotka Autonomous Okrug, Kamchatka Krai, Magadan Oblast, Murmansk Oblast and Sakha, as well as certain parts and cities of Arkhangelsk Oblast, Irkutsk Oblast, Khabarovsk Krai, Komi Republic, Krasnoyarsk Krai, Republic of Karelia, Sakhalin Oblast, Tuva, Tyumen Oblast, as well as all islands of the Arctic Ocean, its seas, the Bering Sea, and the Sea of Okhotsk.

Due to the remoteness and the harsh conditions of the area, since the Soviet times people who work there have traditionally been entitled by the Russian government to higher wages and many other benefits, including earlier retirement age, than workers of other regions. As a result of the climate and environment, the indigenous peoples of the area have developed certain genetic differences that allow them to better cope with the region's environment, as do their cultures.

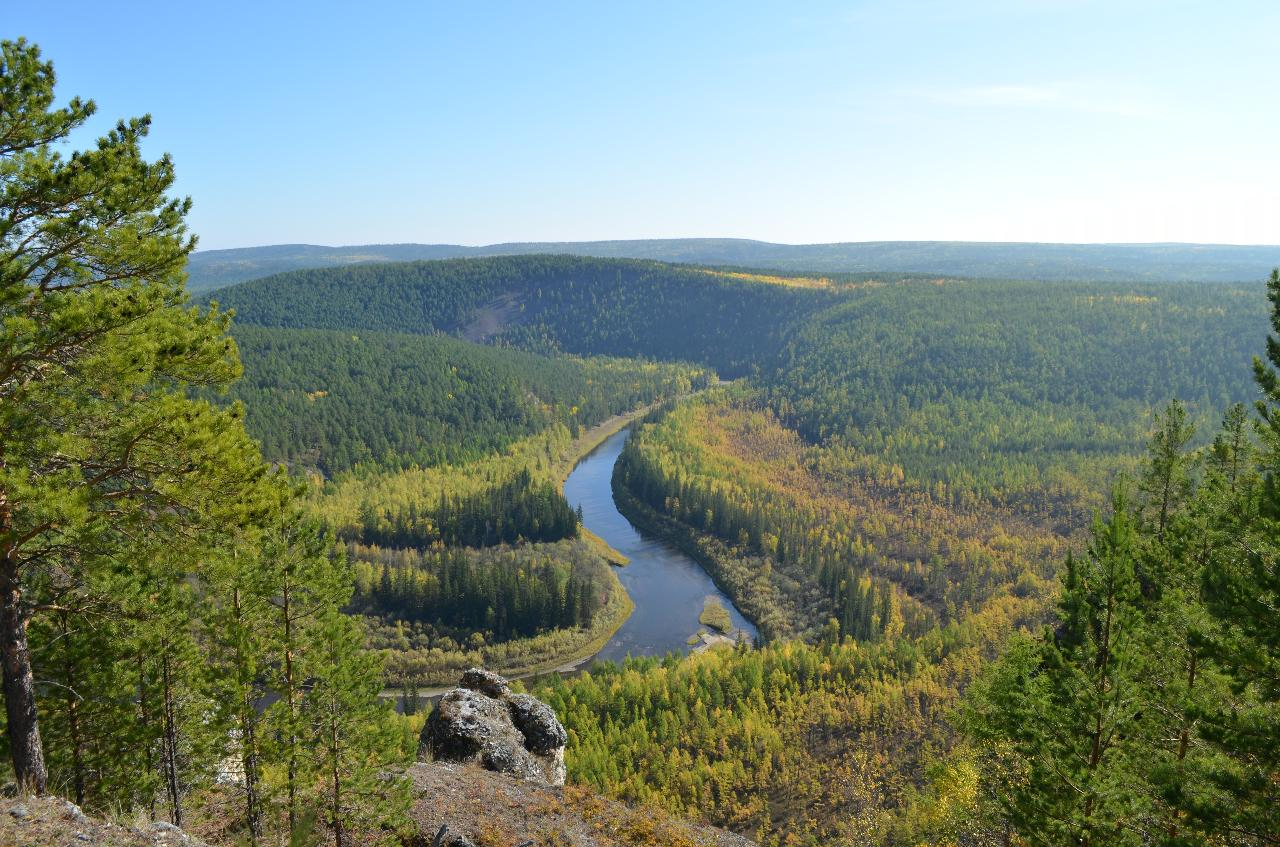
Yakutia

In 2012, photoreporter Justin Jin released a photodocumentary Zone of Absolute Discomfort about gas extraction in Russian Arctic.

== Largest cities ==
- Arkhangelsk (pop. 348,783),
- Yakutsk (pop. 311,760),
- Murmansk (pop. 270,384),
- Severodvinsk (pop. 192,353),
- Norilsk (pop. 176,735),
- Petropavlovsk-Kamchatsky (pop. 164,900),
- Novy Urengoi (pop. 104,107),
- Noyabrsk (pop. 110,620),
- Magadan (pop. 92,782) are the largest cities within the Russian Far North by their population, according to the 2021 Russian census. The larger and more southern Surgut (pop. 396,443) is the largest among cities and territories equated to the Far North.

== Legal status ==
The Far North is known for its extremely harsh climate. People who work there, other than the inmates of labor camps that constituted the Gulag system of the Soviet Union and the inmates of corrective labor colonies in present-day Russia, receive an extra grade of payment, referred to as the "Northern Bonus" (severnye nadbavki Russian: северные надбавки). Additional benefits include extra vacation, extra disability benefits, extra retirement benefits (a lower retirement age), and housing benefits, in compensation for the difficult working conditions. Such compensation began under the Soviet Union and has been maintained by the Russian Federation.

In January 2007, the State Duma Committee for Issues of the North and Far East approved a proposed law defining regions within the Far North that would determine the extent of compensation for workers. The regions were established based on general climate, with harsher regions garnering greater compensation relative to milder regions. In this legal definition, some areas, such as some mountainous areas of Tuva, do not match the intuitive geographical definition of "Extreme North"; in fact they are among the southernmost in Russia.

== See also ==
- Land of Darkness
- List of Russian explorers
- Northern Sea Route
- Russian Far East
- Russian North
- Unified list of Indigenous minority peoples of the North, Siberia, and the Far East of Russia
