= Siân Davey =

British photographer

Siân Davey (born 1964) is a British photographer. Her work focuses on her family, community and self, and is informed by her background in psychology.

Davey has published two books, Looking for Alice (2015) and Martha (2018). In 2017 she had a solo exhibition at the National Portrait Gallery, London, and was awarded the Royal Photographic Society's Hood Medal for Looking for Alice.

== Life and work ==
Davey was born in Brighton in 1964. She studied painting at Bath Academy of Fine Art (1985) and social policy at the University of Brighton (1990). She was a psychotherapist for 15 years before taking up photography in 2014, which she studied at Plymouth University (MA 2014 and MFA 2016).

Her photographic practice focuses on her family, community and self, and is informed by her background in psychology. Her series Looking for Alice is a portrait of her daughter Alice, who has Down syndrome. One of the photographs from this series was selected for the 2014 Taylor Wessing Photographic Portrait Prize exhibition. The series was published by Trolley Books in 2015. In 2016, Looking for Alice was shortlisted for Photobook of the Year in the Paris Photo–Aperture Foundation PhotoBook Awards.

Davey's teenage daughter Martha assisted with the creation of Looking for Alice. This led to Davey's next series Martha, focusing on Martha and her teenage friends. Two photographs from this series were selected for the 2016 Taylor Wessing Photographic Portrait Prize exhibition.

In 2017 Davey exhibited her series Together as a pop-up exhibition at the National Portrait Gallery, London. The work was made as a commission for the McCain Foods We Are Family series, "which celebrates British families in all their shapes and sizes". In creating the work, she travelled across Britain and photographed 31 families in 21 days.

== Publications ==
- Looking for Alice, London: Trolley, 2015. ISBN 978-1-907112-52-2. With a text by David Chandler.
- Martha, London: Trolley, 2018, with a foreword by Kate Bush (Tate Britain photography curator, not the musician of the same name).

== Awards ==
- 2017: Hood Medal, Royal Photographic Society, Bath, for Looking for Alice
- 2019: W. Eugene Smith Fellowship from the W. Eugene Smith Memorial Fund

== Solo exhibitions ==
- We Are Family (Davey's Together series), Print Shop Gallery, National Portrait Gallery, London, 2017
