= W. Eugene Smith Memorial Fund =

W. Eugene Smith Memorial Fund is an organisation established to encourage and support individuals who are active in the field of photography for humanitarian purposes. It gives out the W. Eugene Smith Grant and Howard Chapnick Grant.

Since 1979 the fund has worked to seek out independent voices who work and create outside the boundaries of modern publishing and mass media, following the legacy of W. Eugene Smith. The American photojournalist, working between 1936 and 1978, was committed to the documentation of human condition and suffering. He travelled searching to portray and capture people's behaviour in emotional distress.

For more than thirty years the fund has recognized photographers who explore matters of global importance and address them with integrity and courage.

== W. Eugene Smith Grant ==
Every year a grant is given to a photographer with an innovative and intriguing sight of humans dealing with social, economical, political or environmental issues.

=== Recipients of W. Eugene Smith Grant ===
- 1980: Jane Evelyn Atwood
- 1981: Eugene Richards
- 1982: Sebastião Salgado
- 1983: Milton Rogovin
- 1984: Gilles Peress
- 1985: Donna Ferrato
- 1985: Letizia Battaglia
- 1986: John Vink
- 1987: Graciela Iturbide
- 1988: Paul Graham
- 1989: Cristina Garcia Rodero
- 1990: Carl De Keyzer
- 1991: Dario Mitidieri
- 1992: Eli Reed
- 1993: Marc Asnin
- 1993: James Nachtwey
- 1994: Ellen Binder
- 1995: Vladimir Syomin
- 1996: Gideon Mendel
- 1997: Alain Keler
- 1998: Ernesto Bazan
- 1999: Chien-Chi Chang
- 2000: Brenda Ann Kenneally
- 2001: Maya Goded
- 2002: Kai Wiedenhöfer
- 2003: Trent Parke
- 2004: Stanley Greene
- 2005: Pep Bonet
- 2006: Paolo Pellegrin
- 2007: Stephen Dupont
- 2008: Mikhael Subotzky
- 2009: Lu Guang
- 2010: Darcy Padilla
- 2011: Krisanne Johnson
- 2012: Peter van Agtmael
- 2013: Robin Hammond
- 2014: Joseph Sywenkyj
- 2015: Matt Black for The Geography of Poverty.
- 2016: Daniel Castro Garcia
- 2017: Justyna Mielnikiewicz
- 2018: Mark Peterson
- 2019: Yael Martínez
- 2020: Andrés Cardona, Sabiha Çimen, Laura El-Tantawy, Mariceu Erthal García, Yuki Iwanami
- 2021:Lalo de Almeida, Kimberly dela Cruz, Melissa Lyttle, Cristopher Rogel Blanquet, Nicolò Filippo Rosso
- 2022: Maxim Dondyuk
- 2024: Adriana Loureiro Fernández

== W. Eugene Smith Fellowship ==
With the award of the Grant, a $5000 (US) Fellowship is also shared between one or more finalists deemed worthy of special recognition.

=== Recipients of W. Eugene Smith Fellowship ===
- 2010: Kosuke Okahara for Ibasyo: self-injury among young Japanese girls
- 2011: Massimo Berutti for Dusty path
- 2014: Moises Saman for Discordia: The Arab Spring
- 2015: Jointly awarded to Mary F. Calvert (for The Battle Within: Sexual Violence in America’s Military) and Marcus Bleasdale (for The Unravelling: Central African Republic).
- 2016: Oscar B. Castillo
- 2017: Edmund Clark and Alex Majoli
- 2018: Sarah Blesener
- 2019: Siân Davey
- 2022: Mary F. Calvert

== Howard Chapnick Grant ==
In 1996 a new award was added, the Howard Chapnick Grant, to encourage leadership in fields that are complementary to photojournalism, such as editing research or education and management. The grant was established to honor the memory of Howard Chapnick, former president of Black Star picture agency and writer of The Truth Needs No Ally: Inside Photojournalism. The $5000 (US) grant funds a variety of projects which might include a program of further education, research, a special long-term sabbatical project, or an internship to work with a noteworthy group or individual.

=== Recipients of Howard Chapnick Grant ===
- 1996: Colin Jacobson
- 1997: Susan Grayson
- 1998: Dr. Shahidul Alam
- 1999: Peter Mecca
- 2000: David Spear
- 2001: Zana Briski
- 2002: Elizaveta G. Faktor
- 2003: Tamas Revesz
- 2004: Manoocher Deghati
- 2005: Stephen Edward Ferry
- 2006: Michael Itkoff
- 2007: Danny Peralta, Miguel Anaya, Lyric Cabral, Mark Nevers and Bashira Webb, the Jocelyn Benzakin Fellowship
- 2008: Ren Yue
- 2009: Richard Steven Street
- 2010: [No recipient]
- 2011: Ryan Libre
- 2012: David J. Spear
- 2013: FotoKonbit
- 2014: Muriel Hasbun
- 2015: Tom Garber
- 2016: Liza Faktor
- 2017: Michael Shaw
- 2018: Pete Brook
- 2019: NYC Salt
- 2020: OjoRojo Fabrica Visual (Red Eye Visual Factory)
- 2021: The 400 Years Project
- 2022: Seydou Camara
