= Eugene Richards =

American documentary photographer (born 1944)

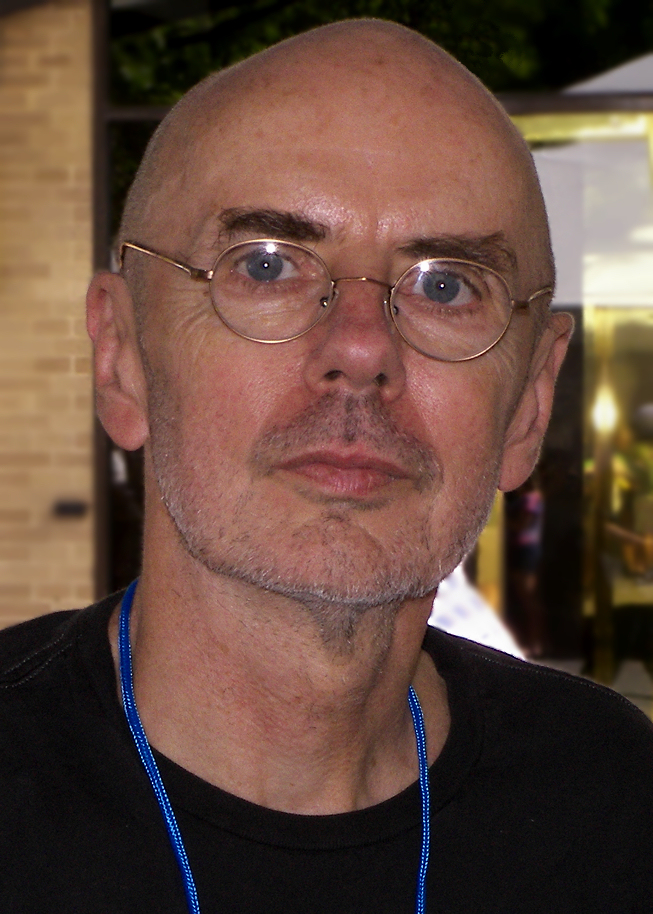
- Richards in 2010
- Born: 1944 (age 81–82); Dorchester, Massachusetts
- Education: Northeastern University; Massachusetts Institute of Technology
- Known for: Photography
- Notable work: Dorchester Days (1978)
- Style: Documentary photography
- Awards: W. Eugene Smith Grant – W. Eugene Smith Memorial Fund; 1981 Photojournalism award – Infinity Award; 1987; Publication award – Infinity Award; 1995 Missouri Honor Medal for Distinguished Service in Journalism; 2014
- Website: www.eugenerichards.com

Eugene Richards (born 1944) is an American documentary photographer living in Brooklyn, New York. He has published many books of photography and has been a member of Magnum Photos and of VII Photo Agency. He was born in Dorchester, Massachusetts.

== Early life and education ==
Richards was born and grew up in Dorchester, Massachusetts.

He received a BA in English from Northeastern University then studied photography at Massachusetts Institute of Technology, supervised by Minor White.

== Life and work ==
During the 1960s, Richards was a civil rights activist and VISTA (Volunteers in Service to America) volunteer.

His first book was Few Comforts or Surprises (1973), a depiction of rural poverty in Arkansas. His second book, the self-published Dorchester Days (1978), set in Dorchester, Massachusetts is "an angry, bitter book", both political and personal. Gerry Badger writes that "[Richards's] involvement with the people he is photographing is total, and he is one of the best of photojournalists in getting that across, often helped by his own prose".

Richards founded Many Voices Press to publish his books, beginning with Dorchester Days. He was invited to join Magnum Photos in 1978, where he remained until 1995, then rejoined in 2002 for three more years. He joined VII Photo Agency in 2006. He lives in Brooklyn, New York.

== Publications ==
- Few Comforts or Surprises: The Arkansas Delta. Cambridge, MA: MIT Press, 1973. ISBN 0-262-18062-6.
- Dorchester Days.
  - Wollaston, MA: self-published / Many Voices, 1978.
  - Second edition, revised and expanded. London: Phaidon, 2000. ISBN 0-7148-4001-7. With an introduction by Dorothea Lynch and an afterword by Richards.
- 50 Hours. New York: Many Voices, 1983. ISBN 0-394-62023-2. With Dorothea Lynch.
- Exploding into Life. New York: Aperture in association with Many Voices, 1986. ISBN 0-89381-177-7. With Dorothea Lynch.
- Below the Line: Living Poor in America. Mount Vernon, NY: Consumers Union, 1987. ISBN 0-89043-061-6 (paperback); ISBN 0-89043-062-4 (hardback). Text ed. Christiane Bird, story researched by Janine Altongy.
- The Knife and Gun Club: Scenes from an Emergency Room. New York: Atlantic Monthly, 1989. ISBN 0-87113-255-9. 2nd ed. 1995.
- With Edward Barnes. Cocaine True, Cocaine Blue. New York: Aperture, 1994. ISBN 0-89381-543-8 (hardback), ISBN 0-89381-564-0 (paperback). New York: Aperture, 1996. ISBN 0-89381-687-6.
- Americans We: Photographs and Notes. New York: Aperture, 1994. ISBN 0-89381-594-2.
- Eugene Richards. Photo Poche series. Paris: Nathan, 1997. ISBN 978-2-09-754106-2.
- Eugene Richards. Phaidon 55 series. London and New York: Phaidon, 2001. Text by Charles Bowden. ISBN 978-0-7148-4025-3
- Stepping through the Ashes. New York: Aperture, 2002. ISBN 1-931788-01-4. With interviews by Janine Altongy.
- The Fat Baby. London: Phaidon, 2004. ISBN 0-7148-4196-X.
- A Procession of Them. University of Texas Press, 2008. ISBN 978-0-292-71910-1.
- The Blue Room. 2008. ISBN 978-0-7148-4832-7.
- War Is Personal. 2010. ISBN 978-0-292-70441-1.
- Red Ball of a Sun Slipping Down. New York: Many Voices, 2014. ISBN 978-0991218905.
- The Day I Was Born. New York: Many Voices, 2020. Edition of 1000 copies.

== Exhibitions ==
- The Blue Room, Rencontres d'Arles, Arles, France, 2009
- Eugene Richards: The Run-On of Time, George Eastman Museum, Rochester, New York, 2017; Nelson-Atkins Museum of Art, Kansas City, Missouri, 2017/18

== Awards ==
- 1981: W. Eugene Smith Grant from the W. Eugene Smith Memorial Fund.
- 1987: Infinity Award: Photojournalism award from the International Center of Photography, New York, for Below The Line: Living Poor in America
- 1995: Infinity Award: Publication award, from the International Center of Photography, New York for Americans We
- 2014: Missouri Honor Medal for Distinguished Service in Journalism, Missouri School of Journalism, University of Missouri, Columbia, MO

== Collections ==
- Addison Gallery of American Art, Andover, Massachusetts: 23 prints (as of 5 January 2022)
- Centre Pompidou, Paris: 4 prints (as of 5 January 2022)
- Fogg Museum, Harvard Art Museums, Cambridge, Massachusetts: 6 prints (as of 5 January 2022)
- Museum of Contemporary Photography, Chicago: 2 prints (as of 4 January 2022)
- Museum of Fine Arts, Boston, Massachusetts: 4 prints (as of 5 January 2022)
- Nelson-Atkins Museum of Art, Kansas City, Missouri: 26 prints (as of 5 January 2022)
- Smithsonian American Art Museum, Washington, D.C.: 4 prints (as of 5 January 2022)

== Videos of Richards ==
- Lassiter, Kenneth T., Gary Bechtold, et al. Techniques of the Masters (videoconference, April 18, 1991). 1991.
- Richards, Eugene. Eugene Richards Photographer of the Year. Rochester, NY: Eastman Kodak Company, 1991.
