= Justin Jin =

Hong Kong-born photojournalist (born 1974)

Justin Jin (born 1974) is a Hong Kong-born Belgian photojournalist. He is a journalist for the South China Morning Post and a photographer for National Geographic.

Jin attained a bachelor's degree in philosophy and his master of arts in political science at Cambridge University. Jin started his career as a correspondent for Reuters.

== Notable works ==
- 2012: Zone of Absolute Discomfort, about Russian Arctic (POYi award) It is a work about gas extraction in Northers Siberia, created during several visits over the previous decade
- 2020: Jens Mühling (text), Justin Jin (photos), "Eiszeit am Baikal" ("Ice Age in Baikal")
- 2022: Heroes of Hydrogen, a photobook. The 2022 book covers four stories: about decarbonization efforts of Swedish steelmaker SSAB; about a French energy entrepreneur Thierry Lepercq, founder of Solairedirect; on how "a Croatian team invents a machine that turns faeces and other wastes into hydrogen-rich gas"; and about the first "hydrogen valley" in the Netherlands. In 2022 King Willem-Alexander of the Netherlands was presented with the first copy by Hydrogen Europe and New Energy Coalition.
- 2023: China: the high-achieving child, on the childhood policies of China

== Awards ==
- 2009: Hansel Mieth Prize for "Sein ist die Rache" ("His Is Revenge") by Erwin Koch (text), Justin Jin (photos), about the military conflict in Caucasus published in Die Zeit
- 2013: Pictures of the Year international (POYi) (for 2012): Award of Excellence in the Science and Natural History, Picture Story category for his work on the Russian Arctic, Zone of Absolute Discomfort
- 2020: Hansel Mieth Prize for "Eiszeit am Baikal" ("Ice Age in Baikal")
- 2023: China: the high-achieving child was nominated for the UNICEF Photo of the Year Award and received the honorable mention.
- 2023: Pictures of the Year international (POYi) (for 2022): Award of Excellence in the Environmental Vision category for his series Fuel of the Future, Now about hydrogen-based energy

== Personal ==
His wife, Heleen, is a Dutch video journalist.
