= Edmund Clark =

British artist and photographer

Edmund Clark HonFRPS is a British artist and photographer whose work explores politics, representation, incarceration and control. His research based work combines a range of references and forms including bookmaking, installations, photography, video, documents, text and found images and material. Several of his projects explore the war on terror.

His notable projects include Guantanamo: If The Light Goes Out, Control Order House, The Mountains of Majeed, and Negative Publicity: Artefacts of Extraordinary Rendition (in collaboration with researcher and writer Crofton Black). Edmund Clark's awards include the 2009 International Photography Award from The British Journal of Photography, 2016 Rencontres d'Arles Photo-Text Book Award and 2017 Infinity Award in Documentary and Photojournalism category from International Center of Photography. In 2018 Clark was awarded an Honorary Fellowship of the Royal Photographic Society. Edmund Clark was the Ikon Gallery's artist-in-residence at Europe's only wholly therapeutic community prison, HM Prison Grendon from 2014 until 2018. Supported by the Marie-Louise von Motesiczky Charitable Trust, the residency culminated in the publication of My Shadow's Reflection (Ikon Gallery: Birmingham and Here Press: London) and a solo exhibition In Place of Hate at Ikon Gallery.

== Life and career ==
Clark worked as a researcher in London and Brussels before gaining a postgraduate diploma in photojournalism at London College of Communication.

He gained access to Guantanamo Bay detention camp and to a house under a control order (housing an individual held under the Terrorism Prevention and Investigation Measures Act 2011). His book Control Order House is his response to a period he spent staying in a house with a man known as 'CE' who had been placed under a Control Order due to his suspected involvement with terrorist-related activity. Clark spent three days working in the house taking a large number of quick, uncomposed photographs surveying the site. These images, along with architectural plans of the house, redacted documents relating to the case and a diary kept by 'CE' form a portrait of sorts: of the site and its inhabitant and of the structure of legal restriction imposed and represented by the house.

His most recent project, again with Crofton Black, is a study of US Department of Defense spending in Cosmopolemos.

== Publications ==
- Still Life: Killing Time. Stockport: Dewi Lewis, 2007. ISBN 978-1904587538
- Guantanamo: If the Light Goes Out. Stockport: Dewi Lewis, 2010. ISBN 978-1904587965
- Control Order House. London: Here, 2013. ISBN 978-0-9574724-0-2. Edition of 250 copies.
  - Second edition. London: Here, 2016. ISBN 978-0-9935853-1-9. Edition of 500 copies.
- The Mountains of Majeed. London: Here, 2014. ISBN 978-0-9574724-8-8. 8 photographs, 4 paintings by Majeed, 3 Taliban poems. Edition of 450 copies.
- Negative Publicity: Artefacts of Extraordinary Rendition. New York: Aperture and Magnum Foundation, 2016. ISBN 978-1-59711-351-9.
  - Second edition. New York: New York: Aperture and Magnum Foundation, 2017.
- My Shadow's Reflection. London: Here; Birmingham: Ikon Gallery, 2018. ISBN 978-1-911155-15-7. Edition of 1000 copies.

== Awards ==
- 2009: International Photography Award, British Journal of Photography
- 2011: Best Photography Book of the Year at the International Photography Awards/Lucie Awards
- 2011: Best Book of the Year Award at the New York Photo Awards
- 2012: Shortlisted for Prix Pictet: Power
- 2012: Best Book of the Year, Premio Ponchielli, GRIN Italian Photography Editors Association
- 2012: Winner Zeit Magazin Fotopreis
- 2013: John Kobal Foundation Grant
- 2011 & 2013: Best Books of the Year, Kassel Photobook Award
- 2014: Magnum Foundation Grant
- 2011 & 2015: The Roddick Foundation Grant
- 2016: Rencontres d'Arles Photo-Text Book Award
- 2017: W. Eugene Smith Memorial Fund Fellowship
- 2017: Infinity Award, International Center of Photography
- 2014: Shortlisted for the Prix Pictet for Guantánamo: If the Light Goes Out
- 2018: Honorary Fellowship of the Royal Photographic Society

== Exhibitions ==
- The Mountains of Majeed, Flowers Gallery, London, 27 February – 4 April 2015
- Edmund Clark: Terror Incognitus, Zephyr, Reiss Engelhorn Museum, Mannheim, 31 January – 3 July 2016
- Edmund Clark: War of Terror, Imperial War Museum, London, 28 July 2016 – 28 August 2017
- In Place of Hate, Ikon Gallery, Birmingham, 6 December 2017 – 11 March 2018
- Edmund Clark: The Day the Music Died, International Center of Photography, New York, NY, 26 January – 6 May 2018
- Unseen Conflicts – War on Terror, Parrotta Contemporary Art, Cologne and Bonn, 7 September – 10 November 2018

== Permanent collections ==
- Fotomuseum Winterthur, Switzerland
- George Eastman Museum, Rochester, NY, USA
- Grinnell College, IA, USA
- Imperial War Museum, London, UK
- Museum of Fine Arts, Houston, TX, USA
- National Science and Media Museum, Bradford, UK
- National Portrait Gallery, London, UK
