= Inge Morath Award =

The Inge Morath Award was established by Magnum Photos in tribute to Inge Morath, an Austrian-born photographer who was associated with Magnum for almost fifty years, and who died in January, 2002. Funded by her colleagues at Magnum Photos, the Award is administered by Magnum Foundation in cooperation with the Inge Morath Foundation.

== Details ==
The annual Inge Morath Award is given to a woman photographer under thirty years of age, to assist in the completion of a long term documentary project. The winner and finalists are selected by the photographer members of Magnum Photos, and a representative of the Morath Foundation, at the Magnum annual meeting. It is the only award that carries the imprimatur of Magnum Photos.

The call and guidelines for submissions are announced annually by Magnum Foundation and The Inge Morath Foundation on their web sites, usually in January/February.

== Winners and finalists ==
Clicking on the project name will link to the presentation, hosted at the Inge Morath Foundation's web site.

Year	Award Winner(s)	Project Title(s)	Finalist(s)
2002	Ami Vitale (USA)	Kashmir	
2004	Claudia Guadarrama (Mexico)	Before the Limit	
2005	Mimi Chakarova (USA)	Sex Trafficking in Eastern Europe	Jessica Dimmock (USA), Shannon Taggart (USA), and Ren Yue (China)
2006	Jessica Dimmock (USA)	The Ninth Floor	Dana Romanoff (USA)
2008	Kathryn R. Cook (USA)	Memory Denied: Turkey and the Armenian Genocide	Leonie Purchas (UK) and Alice Smeets (Belgium)
2007	Olivia Arthur (UK)	The Middle Distance	Newsha Tavakolian (Iran) and Rena Effendi (Azerbaijan)
2009	Emily Schiffer (USA)	Cheyenne River	Jenn Ackerman (USA)
2010	Lurdes Basoli (Spain) and Claire Martin (Australia)	Caracas, The City of Lost Bullets / Selections from "The Downtown East Side" and "Slab City"	
2011	Zhe Chen (China)	Bees	
2012	Isadora Kosofsky (USA)	Selections from “The Three” & “This Existence”	Carlotta Zarattini (Italy)
2013	No Award given		Lauren Pond
2014	Shannon Jansen	A long Walk	Elodie Chrisment
2015	Danielle Villasana	A Light Inside	Sofia Valiente
2016	Daniella Zalcman	Signs of Your Identity	Gabriella Demczuk; Tamara Merino
2017	Johanna-Maria Fritz	Like a Bird	Isadora Romero
2018	Melissa Spitz	You Have Nothing to Worry About	Peyton Fulford; Emily Kinni
2019	Alex Potter	Once a Nation	Kimberly dela Cruz; Tamara Merino; Ioanna Sakellaraki
