= Inge Morath Foundation =

The Inge Morath Foundation was a privately operating non-profit foundation headquartered in New York, New York. The Foundation was established in 2003 to facilitate the study and appreciation of Inge Morath's contribution to photography. Morath was a member of Magnum Photos.

The Foundation also supported work in three program areas: grants and awards, educational programs, and traveling exhibitions.

== See also ==
- Inge Morath Award
