= Sara Sallam =

Sara Sallam (born 1991) is an Egyptian multidisciplinary contemporary artist whose work combines photography, video, writing, sound, collage, and self-publishing handmade books. As an artist, she is known for consulting resources like archival records and using Ancient Egyptian artifacts found in European collections to explore homesickness while critically engaging with the roles space and landscape play in the context of Egyptian artifacts. Her work touches on re-imagining the colonial narratives by exploring death, grief, temporal space, and fiction in an act of reclaiming her Egyptian heritage.

== Biography ==
Born in Cairo, Egypt, 1991, Sallam's interest in Ancient Egypt developed after she left Cairo and moved to Europe. She now resides in the Netherlands.

== Career ==
In November 2022, Sallam held a residency position with the Sainsbury Centre at the University of East Anglia, in Norwish, United-Kingdom, where she worked with the Sainsbury Collection. Sallam produced Come to Your House, a mixed media installation that questioned what it meant to see art museums displaying artifacts that were closely associated with death. Sallam contributed her art pieces The Fourth Pyramid Belongs to Her (2016–2018) and You Died Again on Screen (2018–2020) to install in the Visions of Egypt temporary exhibit that was being held at the Sainsbury Centre. Both of Sallam's art pieces present "alternate ways of experiencing an Egyptian tomb and the dissonance between ancient Egyptians as archaeological artefacts, on the one hand, and ancestors, on the other."

Sallam prepared for a small installation at the Museo Egizio in Turin called Through Tutankhamun's Eyes: Alternative Perspectives on Egyptology. Christina Riggs writes that Sallam's contribution to this exhibition links the experience of immigration with displacement to underline “the epistemic violence of archaeology in colonized lands”. Sallam emphasizes the displacement of Egyptian antiquities in the museum space by using ancient religious motifs to communicate “modern anxieties round death”. Sallam was invited by curator Paolo Del Vesco in an attempt for the museum to present alternative perspectives on Egyptology and challenge the authority of institutions. By playing with notions of the sanctity of the tomb and the Pharaoh's body, Sallam engages with Egypt's past intellectually and emotionally. Based on secondhand accounts, the guests who attended the exhibition were moved greatly by Sallam's work. Alice Stevenson remarks that "Egyptology scholars were reportedly more likely to express scepticism about the value of the intervention than non-Egyptological museum professionals in the building."

Following her exhibition in Turin, in 2023, Sallam had an intervention in the Musées royaux d'art et d'histoire's exhibition: Expedition d'Égypte. For this exhibition, Sallam put together three new works based on her independent research: Home Outside of Home, A Layer of Salt for my Oblivion, and If I Can Be Heard in the Place Where You Are. These were included in the exhibition along with four other of Sallam's works. One of which was Sallam's video installation I Prayed for the Resin not to Melt (2020) that presents a counter narrative to the history of excavation. I Prayed for the Resin not to Melt was the first contemporary art piece to be added to the Egyptology collection, and became a permanent installation in the museum.
