= Inge Morath =

Austrian-American linguist and photographer (1923–2002)

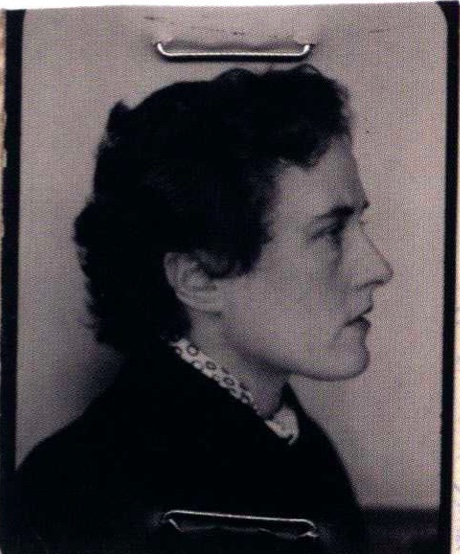
- Self-portrait, 1956
- Born: Ingeborg Hermine Mörath; 27 May 1923; Graz, Austrian Republic
- Died: 30 January 2002 (aged 78); Manhattan, New York, U.S.
- Citizenship: Austria; United States (from 1968)
- Education: Humboldt University of Berlin
- Known for: Photography
- Spouses: Lionel Birch (m. 1951; div. 1953); Arthur Miller (m. 1962)
- Children: 2, including Rebecca
- Relatives: Daniel Day-Lewis (son-in-law); Ronan Day-Lewis (grandson)

Ingeborg Hermine "Inge" Morath (née Mörath; Austrian German: [ˈɪŋɛbɔrɡ ˈmoːraːt]; 27 May 1923 – 30 January 2002) was an Austrian photographer. Joining the Magnum Photos Agency in 1953, Morath became a full photographer with the agency in 1955. Morath is also known for being the third wife of the playwright Arthur Miller and the mother of the filmmaker Rebecca Miller.

== Early years (1923–1945) ==
Morath was born Ingeborg Hermine Mörath on May 27, 1923, in Graz, First Austrian Republic (present-day Austria) to Edgar Mörath, a wood scientist, and Mathilde Mörath (née Wiesler), a scientist. Both of Morath's parents had converted from catholicism to protestantism, and she was raised in a liberal protestant household.

First educated in French-speaking schools, Morath relocated in the 1930s with her family to Darmstadt, a German intellectual center. In 1936, the family moved to Berlin where Morath's father directed the Research Institute for Plywood and Wood Products (German: Leitung des Forschungsinstituts für Sperrholz und andere Holzerzeugnisse). Morath was registered at the Luisenschule near Bahnhof Friedrichstraße.

Morath's first encounter with avant-garde art was the Entartete Kunst (Degenerate Art) exhibition organized by the Nazi Party in 1937, which sought to inflame public opinion against modern art. "I found a number of these paintings exciting and fell in love with Franz Marc's Blue Horse", Morath later wrote. "Only negative comments were allowed, and thus began a long period of keeping silent and concealing thoughts."

After finishing high school, Morath passed the Abitur and was obliged to complete six months of service for the Reichsarbeitsdienst (Reich Labour Service) before entering Humboldt University of Berlin. At university, Morath studied languages. She became fluent in French, English and Romanian in addition to her native German (to these she later added Spanish, Russian and Chinese). "I studied where I could find a quiet space, in the University and the Underground stations that served as air-raid shelters. I did not join the Studentenschaft (Student Body)."

Toward the end of World War II, Morath was drafted for factory service in Tempelhof, a neighbourhood of Berlin, alongside Ukrainian prisoners of war.

During an attack on the factory by Russian bombers, she fled on foot to Austria. In later years, Morath refused to photograph war, preferring to work on stories that showed its consequences.

== Middle years (1945–1962) ==
Mrs. Eveleigh Nash, London, 1953

After the war, Morath worked as a translator and journalist. In 1948, she was hired by Warren Trabant, first as Vienna Correspondent and later as the Austrian editor, for Heute, an illustrated magazine published by the Office of War Information in Munich. Morath encountered photographer Ernst Haas in post-war Vienna, and brought his work to Trabant's attention. Working together for Heute, Morath wrote articles to accompany Haas' pictures. In 1949, Morath and Haas were invited by Robert Capa to join the newly founded Magnum Photos in Paris, where she started as an editor. Working with contact sheets sent into the Magnum office by founding member Henri Cartier-Bresson fascinated Morath. "I think that in studying his way of photographing I learned how to photograph myself, before I ever took a camera into my hand."

Morath was briefly married to the British journalist Lionel Birch and relocated to London in 1951. That same year, she began to photograph during a visit to Venice. "It was instantly clear to me that from now on I would be a photographer", she wrote. "As I continued to photograph I became quite joyous. I knew that I could express the things I wanted to say by giving them form through my eyes." Morath applied for an apprenticeship with Simon Guttman, who was then an editor for Picture Post and running the picture-agency Report. When Guttman asked what Morath wanted to photograph, and why, she answered that "after the isolation of Nazism I felt I had found my language in photography." After Morath had spent several months working as Guttman's secretary, she had an opportunity to take photographs. She sold her first photographs - of opening nights, exhibitions, inaugurations, etc. - under the pseudonym "Egni Tharom", her names spelled backwards.

Morath divorced Birch and returned to Paris to pursue a career in photography. In 1953, after Morath presented her first large picture story, on the Worker Priests of Paris, to Capa, he invited her to join Magnum as a photographer. Her first assignments were stories that did not interest "the big boys." She went to London on an early assignment to photograph the residents of Soho and Mayfair. Morath's portrait of Mrs. Eveleigh Nash, from that assignment, is among her best-known works. At Capa's suggestion, in 1953–54, Morath worked with Cartier-Bresson as a researcher and assistant. In 1955 she was invited to become a full member of Magnum Photos. During the late 1950s, Morath traveled widely, covering stories in Europe, the Middle East, Africa, the United States, and South America, for such publications as Holiday, Paris Match, and Vogue. In 1955 she published Guerre à la Tristesse, photographs of Spain, with Robert Delpire, followed by De la Perse à l'Iran, photographs of Iran, in 1958. Morath published more than thirty monographs during her lifetime.

Like many Magnum members, Morath worked as a stills photographer on numerous motion picture sets. Having met director John Huston while she was living in London, Morath worked on several of his films. Huston's Moulin Rouge (1952) was one of Morath's earliest assignments, and her first time working in a film studio. When Morath confessed to Huston that she had only one roll of color film to work with and asked for his help, Huston bought three more rolls for her, and occasionally waved to her to indicate the right moments to step in with her camera. Huston later wrote of Morath that she "is a high priestess of photography. She has the rare ability to penetrate beyond surfaces and reveal what makes her subject tick."

In 1959, while photographing the making of The Unforgiven, starring Audrey Hepburn, Burt Lancaster, and Audie Murphy, Morath accompanied Huston and his friends duck hunting on a mountain lake outside Durango, Mexico. Photographing the excursion, Morath saw through her telephoto lens that Murphy's companion had capsized their boat 350 yd (320 m) from shore. She could see that Murphy was stunned, and the men were struggling. A skilled swimmer, Morath swam out, stripped down and used her bra straps to haul the two men ashore .

Marilyn Monroe, dancing with Eli Wallach, and Clark Gable, rehearsing a scene during the filming of The Misfits, 1960

Morath worked again with Huston in 1960 on the set of The Misfits, a film featuring Marilyn Monroe, Clark Gable and Montgomery Clift, with a screenplay by Arthur Miller. Magnum Photos had been given exclusive rights to photograph the making of the movie, and Morath and Cartier-Bresson were the first of nine photographers to work on location outside Reno, Nevada during the process. Morath met Miller while working on The Misfits.

== Later years (1962–2002) ==
Morath married Arthur Miller on 17 February 1962 and relocated permanently to the United States. Miller and Morath's first child, Rebecca, was born in September 1962. The couple's second child, Daniel, was born in 1966 with Down syndrome, and Miller institutionalized him shortly after his birth, over Morath's objections. Rebecca Miller is a film director, actress, and writer who is married to the actor Daniel Day-Lewis.

After re-locating to the United States, during the 1960s and 1970s Morath worked closer to home, raising a family with Miller and working with him on several projects. Their first collaboration was the book In Russia (1969), which, together with Chinese Encounters (1979), described their travels and meetings in the Soviet Union and the People's Republic of China. In the Country, published in 1977, was an intimate look at their immediate surroundings. For both Miller, who had lived much of his life in New York City, and Morath, who had come to the US from Europe, the Connecticut countryside offered a fresh encounter with America.

Reflecting on the importance of Morath's linguistic gifts, Miller wrote that "travel with her was a privilege because [alone] I would never been able to penetrate that way." In their travels Morath translated for Miller, while his literary work was the entrée for Morath to encounter an international artistic elite. The Austrian photographer Kurt Kaindl, her long-time colleague, noted that "their cooperation develop[ed] without outward pressure and is solely motivated by their common interest in the people and the respective cultural sphere, a situation that corresponds to Inge Morath's working style, since she generally feels inhibited by assignments."

Morath sought out, befriended, and photographed artists and writers. During the 1950s she photographed artists for Robert Delpire's magazine L'Oeil, including Jean Arp and Alberto Giacometti. She met the artist Saul Steinberg in 1958. When she went to his home to make a portrait, Steinberg came to the door wearing a mask which he had fashioned from a paper bag. Over a period of several years, they collaborated on a series of portraits, inviting individuals and groups of people to pose for Morath wearing Steinberg's masks. Another long-term project was Morath's documentation of many of the most important productions of Arthur Miller's plays.

Louise Bourgeois with her sculpture To Fall on Deaf Ears, 1991

Some of Morath's signal achievements are in portraiture, including posed images of celebrities as well as fleeting images of anonymous passersby. Her pictures of Boris Pasternak's home, Pushkin's library, Chekhov's house, Mao Zedong's bedroom, as well as artists' studios and cemetery memorials, are permeated with the spirit of invisible people still present. The writer Philip Roth, whom Morath photographed in 1965, described her as "the most engaging, sprightly, seemingly harmless voyeur I know. If you're one of her subjects, you hardly know your guard is down and your secret recorded until it's too late. She is a tender intruder with an invisible camera."

Actor Dustin Hoffman with Lee J. Cobb, who originated the role of Willy Loman in Arthur Miller's Death of a Salesman, 1965

As the scope of her projects grew, Morath prepared extensively by studying the language, art, and literature of a country to encounter its culture fully. Although photography was the primary means through which Morath found expression, it was but one of her skills. In addition to the many languages in which she was fluent, Morath was also a prolific diary and letter-writer; her dual gift for words and pictures made her unusual among her colleagues. Morath wrote extensively, and often amusingly, about her photographic subjects. Although she rarely published these texts during her lifetime, posthumous publications have focused upon this aspect of her work. They have brought together her photographs with journal writings, caption notes, and other archival materials relating to her various projects.

During the 1980s and 1990s, Morath continued to pursue both assignments and independent projects. The film Copyright by Inge Morath was made by German filmmaker Sabine Eckhard in 1992, and was one of several films selected for a presentation of Magnum Films at the Berlin International Film Festival in 2007. Eckhard filmed Morath at home and in her studio, and in New York and Paris with her colleagues, including Cartier-Bresson, Elliott Erwitt and others. In 2002, working with film director Regina Strassegger, Morath fulfilled a long-held wish to revisit the lands of her ancestors, along the borderlands of Styria and Slovenia. This mountainous region, once part of the Austro-Hungarian Empire, had become the faultline between two conflicting ideologies after World War II and until 1991, when attempts at rapprochement led to conflict on both sides of the border. The book Last Journey (2002), and Strasseger's film Grenz Räume (Border Space, 2002), document Morath's visits to her homeland during the final years of her life.

== Death ==
Morath Miller died of cancer on January 30, 2002, at the age of 78.

== Honors and legacy ==
- 1983 State of Michigan Senate Resolution NO 295; Tribute to Inge Morath.
- 1984 Doctor Honoris Causa Fine Arts, University of Connecticut, Hartford, US.
- 1992 Austrian State Prize for Photography
- 2002, members of Magnum Photos established the Inge Morath Award in honor of their colleague as an annual award. It is administered by the Inge Morath Foundation, and is given to a woman photographer under the age of 30, to support her work towards the completion of a long-term project.
- 2003, her family established the Inge Morath Foundation to preserve and share her legacy.
- Since 2012 Salzburg, Austria has an "Inge-Morath-Platz" in tribute to the photographer. It is also the location of Fotohof, a photographic institution which has collaborated with her since the beginning of the 1980s

== Trivia ==
- Early in her photography career, Inge Morath sold her first photographs under the playful pseudonym "Egni Tharom"-her own name spelled backwards.

== Solo exhibitions ==
- 1964 Inge Morath: Photographs, Gallery 104, Art Institute of Chicago, Illinois, US.
- 1979 Inge Morath: Photographs of China, Grand Rapids Art Museum, Michigan, US.
- 1984 Salesman in Beijing, Hong Kong Theatre Festival.
- 1988 Retrospective, Union of Photojournalists, Moscow, Russia; Sala del Canal Museum, Madrid, Spain; Rupertinum Museum, Salzburg, Austria.
- 1989 Portraits, Burden Gallery, Aperture Foundation, New York, New York, US; Norwich Cathedral, Norwich, UK; American Cultural Center, Brussels, Belgium.
- 1991 Portraits, Kolbe Museum Berlin, Germany; Rupertinum Museum Salzburg, Austria
- 1992/94 Retrospective, Neue Galerie Linz, Austria; America House, Frankfurt, Germany; Hardenberg Gallery, Velbert, Germany; Galerie Fotogramma, Milano, Italy; Royal Photographic Society, Bath, UK; Smith Gallery and Museum, Stirling, UK; America House, Berlin, Germany; Hradcin Gallery, Prague, Czech Republic.
- 1994 Spain in the fifties, Spanish Institute, New York, US
- 1995 Spain in the fifties, Museo de Arte Contemporaneo, Madrid, Spain; Museo de Navarra, Pamplona, Spain.
- 1996 Inge Morath: Danube, Neues Schauspielhaus, Berlin, Germany; Leica Gallery, New York, US; Galeria Fotoforum, Bolzano, Italy.
- 1996 Women to Women, Takashimaya Gallery, Tokyo, Japan
- 1997 Photographs 1950s to 1990s, Tokyo Museum of Photography, Tokyo, Japan
- 1997 Inge Morath: Danube, Keczkemet Museum, Esztergom Museum, Hungary
- 1997 Retrospective Kunsthal, Rotterdam, Netherlands.
- 1998 Celebrating 75 Years Leica Gallery, New York, US.
- 1998 Retrospective, Edinburgh Festival, Edinburgh, UK; Museum of Photography in Charleroi, Belgium; Municipal Gallery, Pamplona, Spain.
- 1998 Inge Morath: Danube, Festival of Central European Culture, London, UK; Museen d. Stadt Regensburg, Regensburg, Germany.
- 1999 Spain in the Fifties, Museo del Cabilde, Montevideo, Uruguay.
- 1999 Retrospective, Kunsthalle Wien, Austria; FNAC Etoile, Paris, France; FNAC, Barcelona, Spain.
- 2002 Inge Morath: New York, Galerie Fotohof, Salzburg, Austria; Stadt Passau, Europäische; Wochen, Germany ESWE Forum, Wiesbaden; Esther Woerdehoff Galerie, Paris, France; Amerikahaus Tübingen, Germany.
- 2002 Inge Morath: Danube, City Gallery of Russe, Russe, Bulgaria.
- 2003 Exposition, Henri Cartier-Bresson Foundation, Paris, France.
- 2004 Inge Morath: Chinese Encounters, Pingyao International Photography Festival, Pingyao, China.
- 2004 Inge Morath: The Road to Reno, Chicago Cultural Center, Illinois, US.
- 2008 Well Disposed and Trying to See: Inge Morath and Arthur Miller in China, University of Michigan Museum of Art, Ann Arbor, US.
- 2023 Where I See Color. For Her 100th Birthday, Fotohof, Salzburg, Austria

== Monographs ==
- 1955 Guerre à la Tristesse. Delpire, France.
- 1956 Fiesta in Pamplona. Universe Books, US.
- 1956 Venice Observed. Reynal & Co., US.
- 1958 De la Perse à l'Iran. Robert Delpire, France.
- 1960 Bring Forth the Children: A Journey to the Forgotten People of Europe and the Middle East. McGraw-Hill, US.
- 1967 Le Masque (Drawings by Saul Steinberg). Maeght Editeur, France.
- 1969 In Russia. Viking Press, US.
- 1972 In Russia Penguin. ISBN 978-0-670-02028-7
- 1973 East West Exercises. Simon Walker & Co., US.
- 1975 Grosse Photographen unserer Zeit: Inge Morath. C.J. Bucher Verlag, Switzerland.
- 1977 In the Country. Viking Press, US.
- 1979 Inge Morath: Photographs of China. Grand Rapids Art Museum, US.
- 1979 Chinese Encounters. with Arthur Miller. Straus & Giroux, US.
- 1981 Bilder aus Wien: Der Liebe Augustin. Reich Verlag, Switzerland.
- 1984 Salesman in Beijing. with Arthur Miller. Viking Press, US. ISBN 978-0-670-61601-5
- 1986 Portraits. Aperture, US. ISBN 978-0-89381-244-7
- 1991 Russian Journal. Aperture Foundation, US. ISBN 978-1-85619-102-9
- 1992 Inge Morath: Photographs 1952 to 1992. Otto Müller/Verlag, Austria.
- 1994 Inge Morath: Spain in the Fifties. Arte con Texto, Spain.
- 1995 Donau. Verlag, Austria. ISBN 978-3-7013-0916-0
- 1996 Woman to Woman. Magnum Photos, Japan.
- 1999 Inge Morath: Portraits. Verlag, Austria.
- 1999 Arthur Miller: Photographed by Inge Morath. FNAC, Spain.
- 1999 Inge Morath: Life as a Photographer. Kehayoff Books, Germany. ISBN 978-3-929078-92-3
- 2000 Saul Steinberg Masquerade. Viking Studio, US. ISBN 978-0-670-89425-3
- 2002 New York. Otto Müller/Verlag, Austria. ISBN 978-3-7013-1048-7
- 2003 Inge Morath: Last Journey Prestel. ISBN 978-3-7913-2773-0
- 2006 The Road to Reno. Steidl, Germany. ISBN 978-3-86521-203-0
- 2009 Inge Morath: Iran. Steidl, Germany. ISBN 978-3-86521-697-7
- 2009 Inge Morath: First Color. Steidl, Germany. ISBN 978-3-86521-930-5
- 2015 History Travels Badly. London: Fishbar. ISBN 978-0-9569959-6-4
- 2016 Inge Morath: On Style. Abrams, US. ISBN 978-141972234-9
- 2018 Inge Morath: Magnum Legacy. Prestel, US. ISBN 978-3-7913-8201-2

== Secondary literature ==
- 2023 Kurt Kaindl: After Work. In the Home of Inge Morath.. Salzburg: FOTOHOF>EDITION. ISBN 978-3-903334-59-5

== See also ==
- List of Austrian artists and architects
- List of Austrians
- List of street photographers
