= Christopher Nunn =

British photographer

- Born: 1983; Huddersfield, England
- Education: Bradford College
- Occupation: Social documentary photographer
- Website: www.christophernunn.co.uk

Christopher Nunn (born 1983) is a British social documentary and portrait photographer. He had a solo exhibition of his work about the Donbas, Ukraine, at Impressions Gallery in Bradford.

== Life and work ==
Nunn was born in Huddersfield. He earned a BA in photography at Bradford College.

He makes social documentary and portrait photography. He has spent over a decade making work in Ukraine, predominantly in the Donbas region (he suffered a serious eye injury there after being caught up in a mortar attack). He has also made a long term photographic study of his friend the artist David Blackburn, and made work about a woman called Edith.

Together with Kateryna Radchenko and Donald Weber, Nunn has created a series of newspaper-format publications called The Information Front that collates images by Ukrainian photographers and photojournalists of the war in Ukraine.

== Publications ==
=== Booklets, zines and newspapers by Nunn ===
- Kalush. 2013.
- Ukrainian Street Dogs. Leeds: Village, 2014. Zine. Edition of 120 copies.
- Holy Water. Leeds: Village, 2015. Edition of 500 copies.
- Borderland: Stories from Donbas. Essarter, 2019. English, French and Russian text. Newspaper format. Edition of 1000 copies.

=== The Information Front ===
- The Information Front #1: Ukrainian Photographers Witness War in Ukraine. 2022. Newspaper format. Edition of 1500 copies.
- The Information Front #2: Ukraine: The Path to Freedom: a struggle for nationhood through fifty years of photographic history. 2023. Newspaper format.

== Exhibitions ==
=== Solo exhibitions ===
- Borderlands: Stories of Donbas, Impressions Gallery, Bradford, 2019/20

=== Group exhibitions ===
- Youth Rising in the UK 1981–2021, Side Gallery, Newcastle, 2021
