= Tarrah Krajnak =

American photographer

Tarrah Krajnak (born 1979) is an American artist who works with photography, performance, and poetry. In 2020 she received the Lange-Taylor Prize. Krajnak's work is held in the collections of the Centre Pompidou, Paris, Museum of Modern Art, New York, Pinault Collection, Paris and Victoria & Albert Museum, London.

== Life and work ==
Krajnak was born in an orphanage in Lima, Peru in 1979 and adopted by Slovak Americans as a baby. >

Tarrah Krajnak currently works as an associate professor in the UCLA department of art as of July 1, 2024.

== Publications ==
- 1979: Contact Negatives. Zine. Edition of 75 copies.
- El Jardín De Senderos Que Se Bifurcan = The Garden of Forking Paths. DAIS, 2021. With text by Krajnak and Kavior Moon. ISBN 978-1-7339499-3-4. Edition of 175 copies.
- Master Rituals II: Weston's Nudes. TBW, 2022. ISBN 978-1-942953-58-6. Edition of 500 copies.

== Group exhibitions ==
- Image/Counterimage: Tarrah Krajnak, Valie Export, Sanja Iveković, Ana Mendieta, Carrie Mae Weems, Museum Ludwig, Cologne, Germany, April–August 2023
- Regards de Femmes = Women's Perspectives, Fondation A Stichting, Belgium, September–December 2022
- Energy: Sparks from the Collection, Victoria and Albert Museum, London, May 2023 – January 2024 includes Krajnak's 1979: Contact Negatives
- Body to Body, Histories of Photography, Centre Pompidou, Paris, September 2023 – March 2024

== Awards ==
- 2020: Lange-Taylor Prize from the Center for Documentary Studies at Duke University
- 2024: Guggenheim Fellowship

== Collections ==
Krajnak's work is held in the following permanent collections:

- Centre Pompidou, Paris
- Museum of Modern Art, New York
- Pinault Collection, Paris
- Victoria and Albert Museum, London
