= Lange-Taylor Prize =

Academic prize

The Lange-Taylor Prize (or Dorothea Lange–Paul Taylor Prize) is a prize awarded annually since 1990 by the Center for Documentary Studies at Duke University, Durham, NC, to encourage collaboration between documentary writers and photographers. The prize, that has variously been $10,000 and $20,000 (USD), is named after photographer Dorothea Lange and her husband, writer Paul Schuster Taylor. It has been awarded since 1990.

== Winners ==
- 1991: Keith Carter
- 1992: Gray Brechin and Robert Dawson
- 1993: Donna DeCesare and Luis J. Rodriguez for Mara Salvatrucha – An exploration of the lives of the young men and women in Salvadoran street gangs.
- 1994:
- 1995:
- 1996: Mary Berridge and River Huston for Women – Visual and verbal portraits of HIV-positive women and their families.
- 1997: Ernesto Bazan and Silvana Paternostro for El Periodo Especial – Life in Cuba since the collapse of the Soviet Union.
- 1998: Rob Amberg and Sam Gray for I-26: Corridor of Change – the physical, economic, and social changes accompanying highway construction in remote Appalachia.
- 1999: Jason Eskenazi and Jennifer Gould Keil for Mountain Jews: A Lost Tribe – the transition of a centuries-old village in the Caucasus from its traditional way of life.
- 2000: Deborah Luster and C.D. Wright for “One Big Self: Prisoners of Louisiana”
- 2001: Mary Cappello and Paola Ferrario
- 2002: Dona Ann McAdams and Brad Kessler for The Garden of Eden: Living with Schizophrenia on Coney Island, 1983-1998.
- 2003: Misty Keasler and Charles D'Ambrosio.
- 2004: Katherine Dunn and Jim Lommasson.
- 2005: Kent Haruf and Peter Brown.
- 2006: Donald Weber and Larry Frolick.
- 2007: Kurt Pitzer and Roger LeMoyne.
- 2008: Ilan Greenberg and Carolyn Drake for Becoming Chinese: Uighurs in Cultural Transition.
- 2009: Teru Kuwayama and Christian Parenti.
- 2010: Tiana Markova-Gold and Sarah Dohrmann.
- 2013: Jen Kinney.
- 2014: Jon Lowenstein.
- 2015: Michel Huneault Post Mégantic
- 2016: Steven M. Cozart for The Pass/Fail Series
- 2017: Katherine Yungmee Kim for Severance
- 2018: Daniel Ramos for The Land of Illustrious Men
- 2019: Chinen Aimi for Finding Ryukyu
- 2020: Tarrah Krajnak for El Jardín De Senderos Que Se Bifurcan
- 2021: V Haddad and Sam Richardson for Self Portrait Service
