= Rosem Morton =

Filipino documentary photographer, registered nurse

Rosem Morton is a Filipino documentary photographer and registered nurse. She is known for photographing daily life, focusing on themes of health, gender, and racial adversity. Morton's work has been featured in National Geographic, the Washington Post, NPR, and CNN. She has been the recipient of multiple grants from National Geographic and is the founder of Dear Survivor, an audio-visual collection to empower sexual trauma survivors. In 2020, her autobiographical project Wildflower won the Visa d'or Award at Visa pour l'Image.
