= Zed Nelson =

British photographer and filmmaker (born c. 1967)

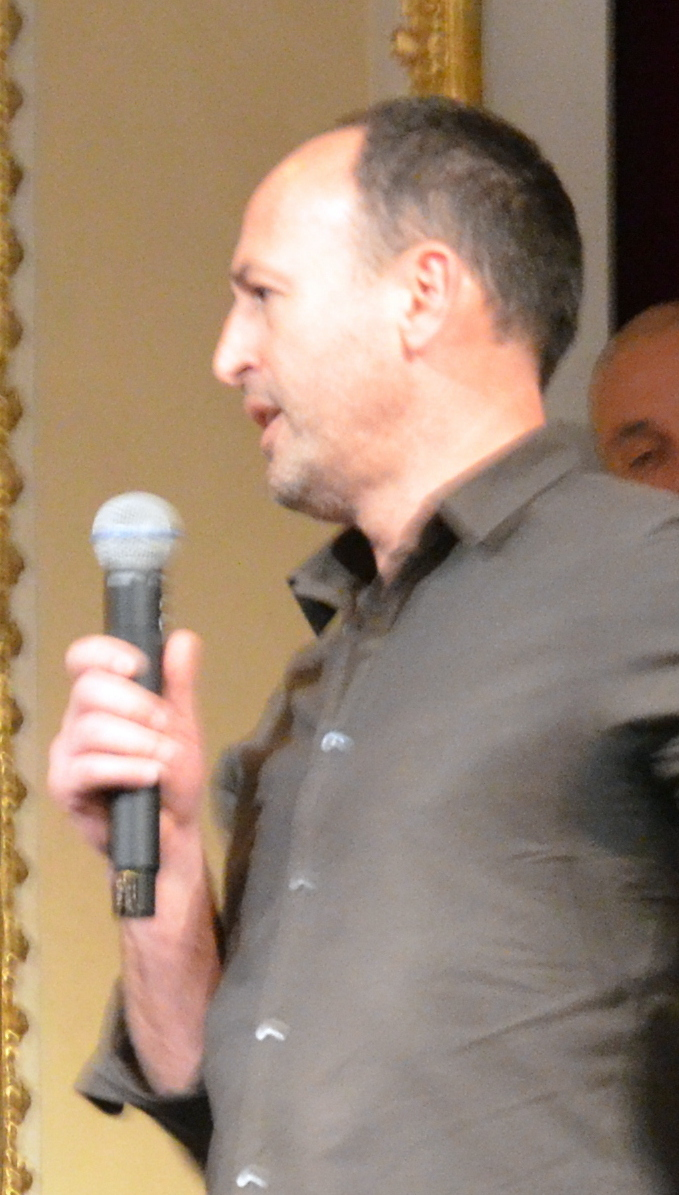
- Nelson in 2015
- Born: Zik Nelson c. 1967; Uganda
- Education: Polytechnic of Central London
- Known for: Photography, filmmaking
- Style: Documentary
- Awards: Visa d'or Feature Award – Visa pour l'Image 1998 Gun Nation; First prize, Daily Life Award – World Press Photo 1998 Gun Nation; First prize – Pictures of the Year International 2010 Love Me; Photographer of the Year – Sony World Photography Awards 2025 The Anthropocene Illusion
- Website: www.zednelson.com

Zik Nelson (born 1965, 1967 or 1968), known professionally as Zed Nelson, is a British documentary photographer and filmmaker who works on long-term projects about contemporary social issues. He lives in London.

In 1999, his Gun Nation photography series, about guns in America, won the Visa d'or Feature Award at Visa pour l'Image and a First prize World Press Photo award. Prints from Gun Nation are held in the collection of the Victoria and Albert Museum in London. In 2010, his Love Me photography series, about Western beauty ideals, won a First prize award from Pictures of the Year International. The Anthropocene Illusion is about the fractured relationship between humans and the natural world, for which he was awarded Photographer of the Year at the 2025 Sony World Photography Awards.

Nelson's films include Gun Nation (2016), a follow-up to his book; and The Street (2019), about gentrification in London.

== Early life and education ==
Nelson was born in Uganda and raised in Hackney, East London from the age of three. He left school at 16 without formal qualifications. He later studied fine art photography at the Polytechnic of Central London.

== Life and work ==
=== Photography ===
He began his career in 1990, working as a freelance photojournalist for The Independent, The Observer, Arena and The Face, and later for The Telegraph Magazine. He undertook assignments in flash-points and war zones including El Salvador, Angola, Afghanistan, Cambodia, Nagorno-Karabakh, and South Africa. In 1994 in Kabul, a vehicle he was travelling in was ambushed and shot up by Afghan mujahideen, after which he moved away from photojournalism.

Gun Nation, made in the late 1990s, explored "America's deadly love affair with guns in the wake of the increasing prevalence of mass shootings." The "photo essay, book and touring exhibition marked a step away from strictly documentary work towards a more analytical approach."

For "The Family" project, Nelson has photographed the same family, in the same way and at the same time every year, from 1991 to the present (2025). The book Love Me (2009) is about the reach of the global beauty industry, cataloguing "operations and other bodily transformations — some of them practically medieval — in 17 countries on five continents." In the early 2010s, Nelson made portraits of people from a "disappearing Britain": war veterans, miners, boxers and fishermen; and photographed people helping to create the then newly emerging country of South Sudan. "Hackney: A Tale of Two Cities" (2014), is about "hyper-gentrification" and the "bizarre juxtapositions of wealth and poverty, aspiration and hopelessness". Some of the work from "Hackney: A Tale of Two Cities" appeared in his book A Portrait of Hackney (2014). In 2015 he photographed the homes of Britain's billionaires.

The Anthropocene Illusion "explores the fractured relationship between humans and the natural world." "It is less concerned with evidencing environmental catastrophe than exploring how and why we let it happen." The project was made over six years and four continents.

=== Filmmaking ===
Shelter in Place (2009) "exposes malpractices in the petrochemical industry in Texas". Europe's Immigration Disaster (2014), filmed over a five-month period, tells the story of the 2013 Lampedusa migrant shipwreck. Following his 2000 book of the same name, the film Gun Nation (2016) is about guns in America, for which Nelson "captured unguarded interviews with the Americans who use guns every day, as well as one affected by disaster". His first feature-length film The Street (2019), made over 4 years, examined similar issues to his "Hackney: A Tale of Two Cities" photography project. The film "captures the rapid gentrification of Hoxton Street — a historically working-class neighbourhood in Hackney, one of London's poorest boroughs."

== Personal life ==
Nelson lives in London.

== Publications ==
=== Books by Nelson ===
- Gun Nation. Westzone, 2000. ISBN 978-0953743834.
- In This Land. 2013. Published to coincide with an exhibition at Noorderlicht, the Netherlands. Edition of 200 copies.
- Love Me. Rome: Contrasto, 2009. ISBN 978-8869651656. With an introduction by Tim Adams and a foreword by Susan Bright.
- A Portrait of Hackney. Book 3: East London Photo Stories. London: Hoxton Mini Press, 2014. ISBN 978-0-9576998-3-0.

=== Books with contributions by Nelson ===
- The Slate Sea. Camden Trust, 2015. Edited by Nelson and Paul Henry. Photographs by Nelson, poems by A. Conran, Menna Elfyn, Paul Henry, Christopher Meredith, Owen Sheers, and Samantha Wynne Rhydderch. With a foreword by Bob Borezello and an introduction by Tom Henry. ISBN 9780993250903.

== Films ==
- Shelter in Place (2009) – director, cinematographer; 48 mins
- Europe's Immigration Disaster (Channel 4, 2014) – director, cinematographer; 30 mins
- Gun Nation (2016) – director, producer, cinematographer; 30 mins
- The Street (2019) – director, producer, cinematographer; 94 mins

== Awards ==
- 1998: Winner, Visa d'or Feature Award, Visa pour l'Image, France for Gun Nation
- 1998: First prize, Daily Life Award, World Press Photo 1997, Amsterdam for Gun Nation
- 1999: First prize, Alfred Eisenstaedt Awards for Magazine Photography, Columbia University Graduate School of Journalism, New York City for Gun Nation
- 2010: Third prize, Contemporary Issues, World Press Photo 2010, Amsterdam for Love Me
- 2010: First prize, Pictures of the Year International, for Love Me
- 2025: Photographer of the Year, Sony World Photography Awards, for The Anthropocene Illusion

== Solo exhibitions ==
- Zed Nelson: Love Me, Impressions Gallery, Bradford, March–May 2011; then toured to Perspektivet Museum, Norway, October 2012 – January 2013; Durham Art Gallery, May–June 2012; and Wolverhampton Art Gallery, February–June 2013

== Collections ==
Nelson's work is held in the following permanent collection:

- Victoria and Albert Museum, London: 2 prints from Gun Nation
