= David Zimmerman (photographer) =

American photographer

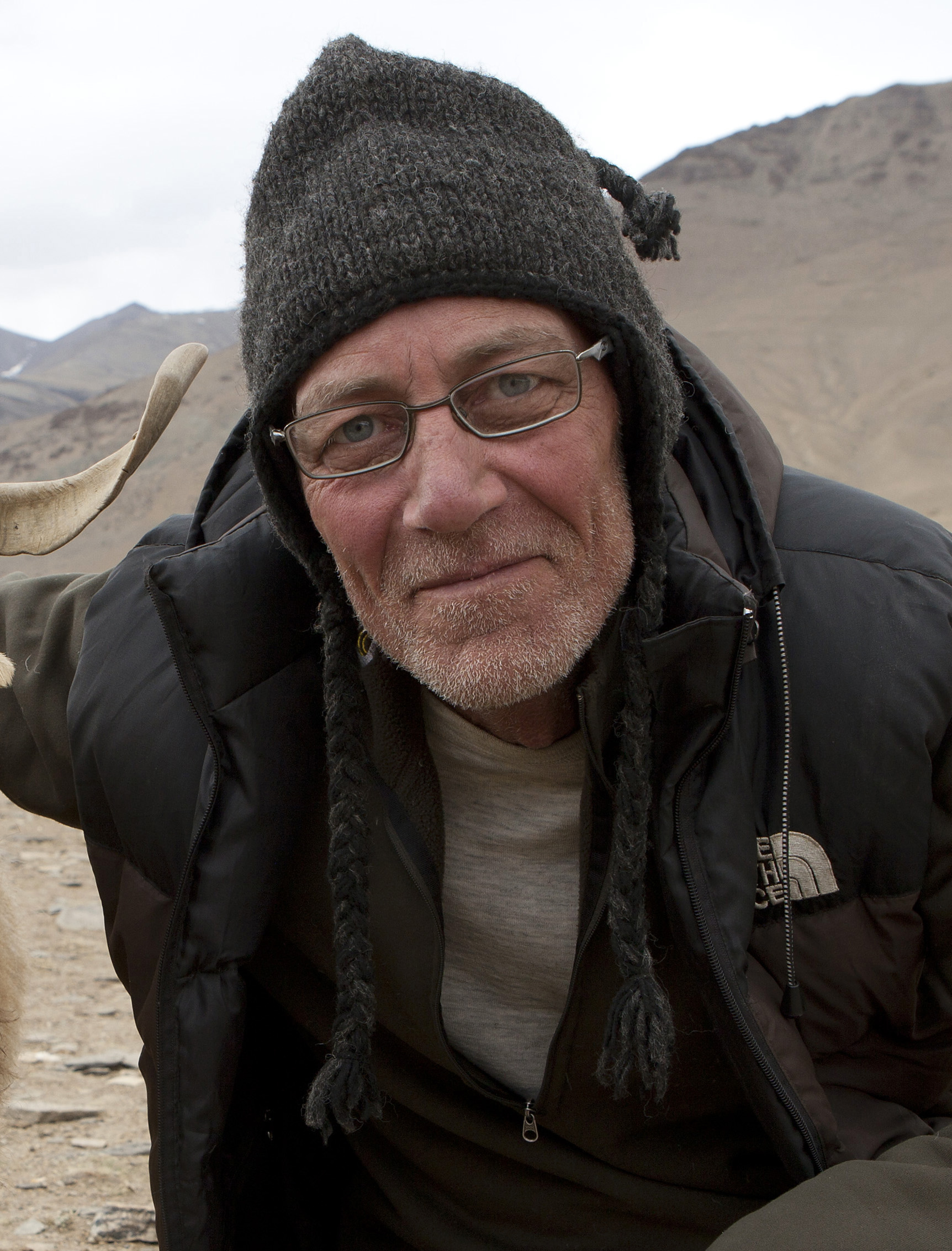
David J. Zimmerman in the Indian Himalayas

David J. Zimmerman (born 1955) is an American photographer who works on long-term projects of social documentary and landscape photography. His works include landscape photographs in deserts of the American southwest, still life studies in communities of marginalized inhabitants in New Mexico, and portraits of Tibetan refugees living in India.

Zimmerman's monograph, One Voice: Portraits from the Tibetan Diaspora was published in 2017.

Zimmerman has won the L'Iris d'Or, 'Photographer of the Year' at the Sony World Photography Awards. He is a member of the World Photographic Academy.

== Life and work ==
Zimmerman was born in 1955 in Milwaukee, Wisconsin. He graduated from Brooks Institute in Santa Barbara, California in 1981 with a degree in photography.

Photographer Mary Ellen Mark called Zimmerman's Desert works "a unique vision of the beauty, poetry and power possible in great landscape photography". Of Zimmerman's series Last Refuge – photographs in marginalized communities in New Mexico, photo historian Carole Naggar writes:

Even though they speak to us of an endangered territory and its marginalized inhabitants, Zimmerman's photographs leave us room for hope. They do not illustrate an idea but remain open to mystery, projecting a metaphysical presence. Zimmerman's work is unique in that it is positioned at the crossroads of two traditions: landscape photography and the study of the impact of man on his environment, represented by photographers such as Robert Adams and Richard Misrach, both of whom he admires; and humanistic photography in the tradition of the Farm Security Administration, which documented the great migrations in the wake of the Depression. Whether indirectly, through photos of the territory, or directly, through portraits, it is always people who are at the center of Zimmerman's preoccupations. Between sand and sky, earth and heaven, the images of Last Refuge are above all a testimony to man's resilience and spirit, living in a damaged territory.

Zimmerman's work, One Voice: Portraits from the Tibetan Diaspora (2012–2017) was photographed in Tibetan villages, nomad camps, and refugee settlements in India. Robert Hariman writes (in his essay "The Last Individuals") "The portraits are profoundly evocative precisely because they draw on deep wells of moral and artistic truth. By risking dismissal for being conventional, they each paradoxically achieve the singularity of a work of art."

Zimmerman has been a guest artist in Mumbai, India at the Photographers Guild of India in 2005, and the National Centre for the Performing Arts in 2013. In 2014 he presented a seminar of the work One Voice at the Annenberg Space for Photography in Los Angeles.

In 2011 Zimmerman co-founded the Himalayan Art Centre – a school providing free education in visual story-telling through photography and filmmaking in Dharamshala, India.

In July 2020, David Zimmerman partnered with the digital collectible cards company Phil Ropy and created a card to raise awareness for The Tibet Fund. The picture on the card shows a portrait of a Tibetan monk from his monograph, One Voice: Portraits from the Tibetan Diaspora. The card is displayed on the home page of the Tibet Fund's website and the proceeds from the sales of the card are redistributed to the organization.

== Publications ==
- Last Refuge. Exhibition catalog. New York, NY: Sous Les Etoiles Gallery, 2011. ISBN 9781467509213
- One Voice: Portraits from the Tibetan Diaspora. Heidelberg, Germany: Kehrer Verlag, 2017. ISBN 978-3-86828-773-8.

== Technique ==
Zimmerman's Gulf Coast portraits were photographed with an 8×10 inch large format view camera.

== Exhibitions ==
- Desert, Aperture Gallery, New York, NY., Galerie Esther Woerdehoff, Paris, France. Centro de la Imagen, Mexico City. World Photography Awards global tour, 2009 (with others).
- Desert, World Photography Organisation, Cannes, France, 2010. (solo)
- Barriers, Thessaloniki Photo Festival "Contrast", Thessaloniki, Greece, 2010 (solo).
- Manmade Landscape, "Curator's Choice", Harwood Museum of Art, Taos, NM, 2011 (with others).
- Last Refuge, Sous Les Etoiles Gallery, New York, NY, 2011/2012 (solo).
- One Voice: Portraits from the Tibetan Diaspora, "Tulkus 1880-2018, Paola Pivi", Witte de With Centrum voor Hedendaagse Kunst, Rotterdam, Netherlands, 2013 (with others).
- One Voice: Portraits from the Tibetan Diaspora, "Refugee", Annenberg Space for Photography, Los Angeles, CA, 2016 (with others).
- One Voice: Portraits from the Tibetan Diaspora, Sous Les Etoiles Gallery, New York, NY, 2017 (solo).

== Awards ==
- 2009: World Photography Awards, World Photography Organisation, L'Iris d'Or, Photographer of the Year, for the Desert project.
- 2009: World Photography Awards, World Photography Organisation, Fine Art Landscape, Winner, for the Desert project.
- 2009: Photolucida Critical Mass, Finalist, for the Barriers project.
- 2009: Center for Fine Art Photography, Director's Selection Award, Juror's Selection Award, for a photograph from the Desert project.
- 2017: International Photography Awards, Best of Show (Print), 3rd Prize, Monograph, One Voice: Portraits from the Tibetan Diaspora.
