= Donald Weber (photographer) =

Canadian photographer

Donald Weber (born 1973) is a Canadian photographer who focuses on the effects of world power. He is a member of VII Photo Agency. Weber's books include Bastard Eden, Our Chernobyl (2008), Interrogations (2011), Barricade: The EuroMaidan Revolt (with Arthur Bondar, 2015) and War Sand (2017).

Weber has had solo exhibitions at Phodar Foundation, Pleven, Bulgaria; Pikto Gallery, Toronto, Canada; and Alice Austen House, New York City. He has received a Guggenheim Fellowship, a World Press Photo Award, the Lange-Taylor Prize, a Sony World Photography Award and the Duke and Duchess of York Prize in Photography.

== Life and work ==
Weber was born in 1973 in Toronto, Ontario.

He joined VII Network in 2008 and became a full member of VII Photo Agency in 2013.

Weber focuses on the effects of world power, how state power functions the world over and how those in power use theatre to coerce their subjects; he seeks to uncover the unspoken collaboration between the parties with his photography.

He worked in Ukraine and Russia for seven years, making numerous visits beginning in 2005. In 2010 and 2011 for his book Interrogations he investigated the power relationship between police and criminals by photographing people being interrogated by Ukrainian police and subjected to both psychological and physical abuse in order to extract information. Weber has spoken about how these techniques are not specific to Ukraine but are standard police practice and used elsewhere, for example in Canada. In The Photobook: A History, Vol. 3, Martin Parr and Gerry Badger praised Interrogations, writing "Weber's vision is clear-eyed and unflinching in its sober directness, which makes it both effective and discomforting to look at."

Together with Christopher Nunn and Kateryna Radchenko, Weber has created a series of newspaper-format publications called The Information Front that collates images by Ukrainian photographers and photojournalists of the war in Ukraine.

== Publications ==
- Bastard Eden, Our Chernobyl. Portland, Oregon: Photolucida, 2008. ISBN 978-1934334058. With text by Larry Frolick.
- Interrogations. Amsterdam: Schilt, 2011. ISBN 978-90-5330-759-5. With an epilogue comprising a short story by Frolick, "The State is me and you", a short essay by Weber and Frolick, "Confessions of an Invisible Man", and an "Afterthought" by Weber.
- Barricade: The EuroMaidan Revolt. Amsterdam: Schilt, 2015. ISBN 978-9053308417. By Weber and Arthur Bondar. With text by Frolick, "Pursued by the Thing: God, History & Ukraine".
- War Sand. Self-published, 2017. With text by Frolick, Kevin Robbie and Weber. English, French and German.

== Exhibitions ==
=== Solo exhibitions ===
- 2007: Phodar Photography Biennial, Phodar Foundation, Pleven, Bulgaria.
- 2009: The Drunken Bride, Russia Unveiled, Pikto Gallery, Toronto, Canada, 29 April – 31 May 2009.
- 2009: Russian Archive, Alice Austen House, New York City.

=== Group exhibitions and exhibitions with others ===
- 2013: Interrogations, White Cloth Gallery, Leeds, England, 21 February – 2 April 2013. With Maciej Dakowicz.
- 2014: Shift: Ukraine in crisis, Third Floor Gallery, Cardiff, Wales, 3 May – 29 June 2014. Photographs by Alexander Chekmenev, Maxim Dondyuk, Corentin Fohlen, Louisa Gouliamaki, Brendan Hoffman, Tom Jamieson, Marco Kesseler, Anastasia Taylor-Lind, Donald Weber and Emine Ziyatdinova.

== Awards ==
- 2006: Lange-Taylor Prize from the Center for Documentary Studies, Duke University, Durham, NC, with Larry Frolick.
- 2006: Honorable mention, World Press Photo Awards, Daily Life category, World Press Photo, Amsterdam.
- 2007: Guggenheim Fellowship to work on Interrogations.
- 2007: Critical Mass Book Award, Photolucida, for Interrogations.
- 2009: Duke and Duchess of York Prize in Photography, Canada Council.
- 2012: Emergency Fund Grant, Magnum Foundation.
- 2012: Sony World Photography Award, World Photography Organisation, Professional category, for Life in the Exclusion Zone.
- 2012: First prize, World Press Photo Awards, Portraits–Stories category, World Press Photo, Amsterdam, for Interrogation Room.
- 2014: Shortlisted / finalist for the Scotiabank Photography Prize, Scotiabank, for Interrogations.
