= Jason Eskenazi =

American photographer (born 1960)

Jason Eskenazi (born April 23, 1960) is an American photographer, based in Brooklyn, New York. The majority of his photography is from the countries of the former Soviet Union, including his book Wonderland: A Fairy Tale of the Soviet Monolith (2008).

Eskenazi received the Dorothea Lange/Paul Taylor Prize and a Guggenheim Fellowship, both in 1999. Wonderland won first place in a book award from Pictures of the Year International in 2008.

== Biography ==
Eskenazi was born April 23, 1960, in Queens, New York. He attended Bayside High School then studied psychology and American literature at Queens College. While at Queens College he was photo editor for the yearbook, assisted photographers on assignment and worked as a freelance photographer for the Queens Tribune. After graduation he worked in darkrooms, obtained local photo assignments, continued as an assistant and interned at a photo agency in New York. At age 29, inspired by the fall of the Berlin Wall, he began to travel and make photographs. His first trips were to Romania (for its first democratic election) and to Germany, then Russia in 1991 just before the August coup that marked the end of the Soviet Union.

In 2004 and 2005 Eskenazi directed a Kids with Cameras project in Jerusalem, teaching photography to Arab Muslims and Jewish children. Their photographs were exhibited in New York, San Francisco, Oklahoma, and Montreal, and in Eskenazi's self-published book, Beyond the Wall.

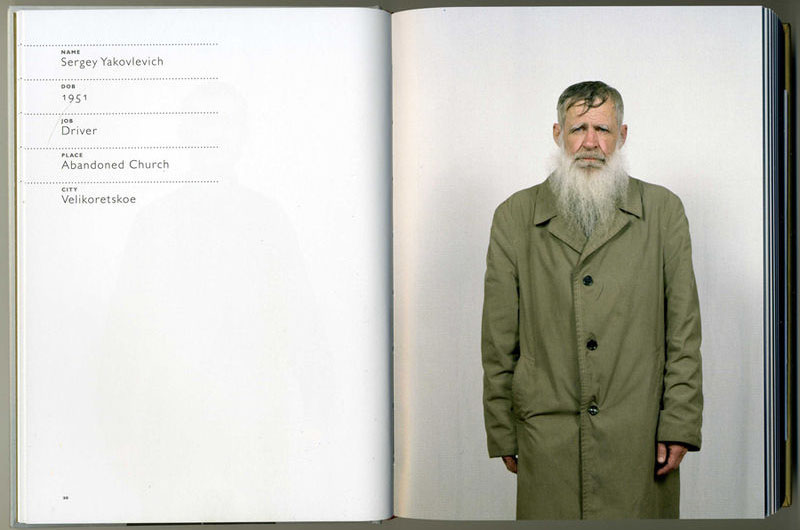
Page spread from Title Nation

In 2005, funded by a grant from the Fulbright Program, Eskenazi and Russian photographer Valeri Nistratov travelled in the Russian Federation, from Kaliningrad to Vladivostok. They made color portraits of people using a 4×5 large format camera, resulting in the book Title Nation.

For economic reasons as well as to obtain health insurance, Eskenazi worked from 2008 to 2009 as a security guard at the Metropolitan Museum of Art in New York. During this time, he worked as a guard for the exhibition Looking In: Robert Frank's The Americans, which allowed him much time to study and be inspired by Robert Frank's photographs. He asked renowned photographers and others he recognized visiting the exhibition what their favorite image was from Frank's book The Americans, and why. He edited the resulting notes and thoughts of 276 photographers into a book, By the Glow of the Jukebox: The Americans List. William Meyers, writing in The Wall Street Journal, favorably reviewed The Americans List, as did photographer David Carol.

Eskenazi is one of the founding editors of Sw!pe magazine, created by guards at the Metropolitan who are artists in their free time. Eskenazi co-founded Red Hook Editions, a publishing cooperative of photographers. He is co-creator of a large-format zine titled Dog Food, blending parody and photography and also published online. (Note: Dogfood within Eskenazi's site.)

== The trilogy ==
Eskenazi's preferred way of disseminating his work is the photobook. His most important work is a trilogy of photobooks spanning 30 years. Although their page size varies, they share a common design with bare boards and an open spine. Each consists of three numbered sections; the numbering of these sections, and of the plates, is consecutive across the trilogy. In each book, the photography style appears documentary black and white, but the photos are recontextualized in an imagined conceptual and visual narrative.

For the first of these books, Wonderland: A Fairy Tale of the Soviet Monolith, Eskenazi undertook an extensive project in Russia and the former Soviet Union between 1991 and 2001. Using the fairy tale as a framework, he "took the title of his book from Alice in Wonderland, [and] likens the breakup of the Soviet Union (and the food and security provided by the Communist Party) to the end of childhood." Eugene Richards commented: "Most photographers today either do art photography or create blunt, in-your-face messages. . . . The place he went to could be seen in a million ways, but Eskenazi always seems to capture the little non-moments, the lonely souls." An exhibition of the work was held at the Leica Gallery in New York. The book won first prize in Pictures of the Year International's 'Best Use Books' category in 2008.

In 2011 Eskenazi successfully raised funding via a Kickstarter campaign to complete The Black Garden, envisioned as "a companion to" Wonderland and a photographic investigation of the East–west divide. It appeared, eight years later, as the second volume (largest in format) of a trilogy.

The framework for The Black Garden is Greek mythology, and the book was photographed within "the vast geographical and mythical world known to ancient Greece", from the Mediterranean to the Caucasus, including Turkey, Greece, Iraq, Afghanistan, Ukraine, Egypt, Libya, and Sicily, as well as New York City.

The third book in the trilogy, Departure Lounge completes the cycle by revisiting the territory of the first book, forming "an aged or matured Wonderland, as you can see some of the Wonderland characters reappearing in Departure Lounge". The book investigates how we depart from reality, from friends, and from ourselves. The Black Garden and Departure Lounge were published simultaneously in 2019. Eskenazi felt that with that release, his work was completed, and has stated his intention to quit photography and start a family.

== Publications ==
=== Publications by Eskenazi ===
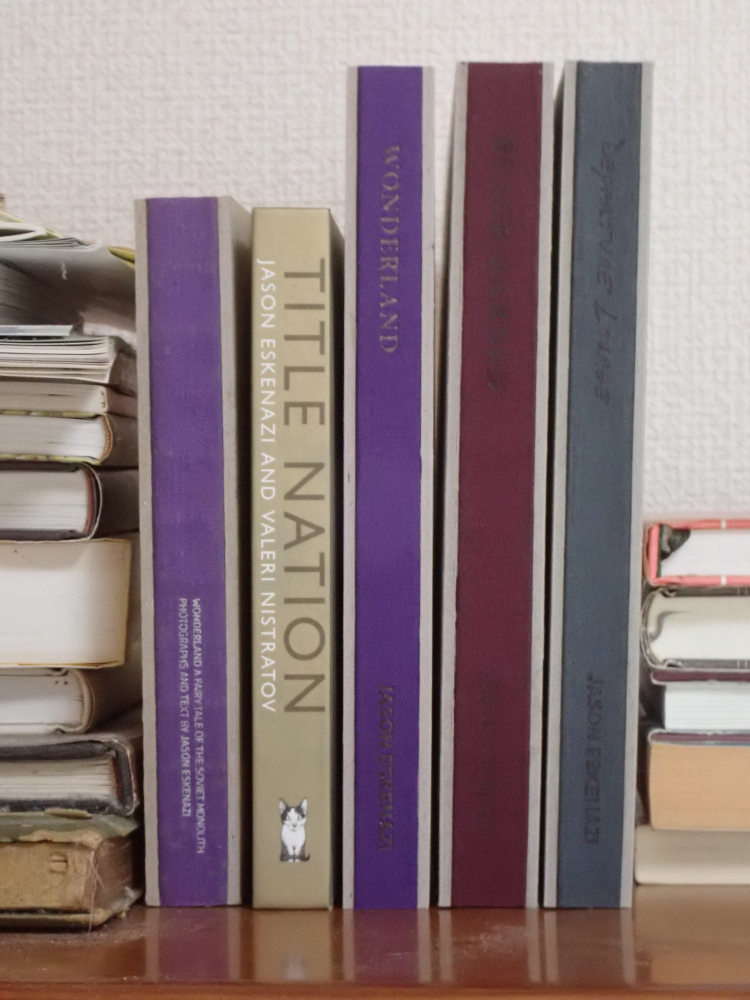
From left to right: Wonderland (2009), Title Nation (with Valeri Nistratov), Wonderland (2020), Black Garden, Departure Lounge

- Wonderland: A Fairytale of the Soviet Monolith.
  - Millbrook, New York: de.MO, 2008. ISBN 978-0-9742836-7-8. Edition of 712 copies. (Note: Its web page at de.MO (as retrieved by the Wayback Machine on 8 March 2014) is here. Eskenazi's description (as retrieved by the Wayback Machine on 21 November 2008) is here.)
  - New York: Red Hook, 2009. ISBN 978-0-9841954-0-4. Edition of 2000 copies. (Note: Eskenazi's description (as retrieved by the Wayback Machine on 29 April 2011) is here.) 17.8×12.7 cm. Sections 1 to 3; plates 1 to 77.
  - New York: Red Hook, 2020. ISBN 978-0-9841954-1-1. Larger format (21×14.5 cm). (Note: Eskenazi's description (as retrieved by the Wayback Machine on 9 November 2020) is here. Red Hook's page about Wonderland is here.)
- Title Nation (with Valeri Nistratov). Amsterdam: Schilt, 2010. ISBN 978-9-053307-39-7. (Note: Its web page at Schilt (as retrieved by the Wayback Machine on 28 December 2013) is here.) With a DVD containing Title Nation, Vitebsky and Camera Obscura.
- Black Garden. New York: Red Hook, 2019. ISBN 978-0-9841954-6-6. Sections 4 to 6; plates 78 to 231. (Note: Red Hook's page about Black Garden.)
- Departure Lounge. New York: Red Hook, 2019. ISBN 978-0-9841954-7-3. Sections 7 to 9; plates 232 to 314. (Note: Red Hook's page about Departure Lounge.)

=== Publications edited by Eskenazi ===
- Beyond the Wall. Self-published using Blurb.com, 2010. (Note: Its web page at Blurb is here.)
- By the Glow of the Juke Box: The Americans List.
  - New York: Red Hook, 2012. ISBN 978-0-9841954-8-0. (Note: Its web page at Red Hook is here.)
  - Müzik Kutusunun Parıltısı Eşliğinde: The Americans Listesi. Istanbul: Espas Kuram Sanat Yayınları [Espas art & theory publications], 2012. ISBN 978-6054363148. Turkish-language edition.
  - By the Glow of the Juke Box: The Americans List II. Expanded edition. New York: Red Hook, 2016. ISBN 978-0-9841954-2-8. With contributions by Mary Ellen Mark, Joel Meyerowitz, Jeffrey Ladd, Robert Frank, Martin Parr, Philip Perkis, David Alan Harvey, Bill Burke, Josef Koudelka, John Gossage, Juliana Beasley, Sara Terry, Mark Steinmetz, Vanessa Winship, Alec Soth, Peter van Agtmael, Glenna Gordon, Alan Chin, and others.
- Dog Food, Issue 1. New York: Red Hook, 2012. (Note: It is available to read within Eskenazi's site at http://jasoneskenazi.com/DOGFOOD_01.pdf)
- Dog Food, Issue 2. New York: Red Hook, 2013. (Note: It is available to read within Eskenazi's site at http://jasoneskenazi.com/DOGFOOD_02.pdf)
- Dog Food, Issue 3. New York: Red Hook, 2014. (Note: It is available to read at http://issuu.com/dogfoodmagazine/docs/df3-web (Issuu))

=== Publications with contributions by Eskenazi ===
- Contatti. Provini d'Autore = Choosing the best photo by using the contact sheet. Vol. II. Edited by Giammaria De Gasperis. Rome: Postcart, 2013. ISBN 978-88-98391-01-1.
- 100 Great Street Photographs. Munich, London, New York: Prestel, 2017. By David Gibson. ISBN 978-3791383132. Contains a commentary on and a photograph by Eskenazi.

== Awards and grants ==
- Alicia Patterson Foundation Grant, 1996.
- Dorothea Lange/Paul Taylor Prize, 1999, for his story The Red Village, photographs of Jewish people in the village of Krasnayasloboda in Azerbaijan.
- Guggenheim Fellowship from the John Simon Guggenheim Memorial Foundation, 1999.
- Fulbright Program Scholarship, 2004, to make Title Nation.
- Residency, Blue Mountain Center, 2006, New York, to make prints for Wonderland.
- Milton and Sally Michel Avery Residency, Yaddo, New York, 2007.
- Best Photography Book, Pictures of the Year International, 2008, for Wonderland.

== Exhibitions ==
=== Solo exhibitions ===
- 2004: Wonderland, Visa pour l'image, Perpignan, France.
- 2007: Wonderland, Berkeley Graduate School of Journalism, North Gate Hall, University of California.
- 2008–2009: Wonderland, Leica Gallery, New York.
- 2011: Vanishing Points, Reilly Gallery, Providence College, Rhode Island, USA. Photographs of people at the World Trade Center site in New York City, taken with a Zenit Horizon panoramic camera. (Note: Its web page within Eskenazi's site is here.)

=== Exhibitions with others ===
- 1999: Caucasus and Haiti: The Boys of Summer, Moving Walls 2, Open Society Institute, New York.
- 2012: Double Zero, Look3, Charlottesville Festival of the Photograph, USA. (Note: A video of the projected exhibit can be watched here at vimeo.com.)
- 2013: Double Zero, Develop Photo line-up, On Photography Online Film Festival, Fotoweek, the Netherlands.
- 2013: A Gathering of Images, Leica Gallery, New York. With numerous other photographers.
- 2014: Double Zero, Istituto Superiore Antincendi (ISA), FotoLeggendo festival, Rome.

=== Exhibitions curated by Eskenazi ===
- 2011: Bursa Photography Festival, Bursa, Turkey.
- 2013: Come Again! Seen-Unseen, Gallery BU, Istanbul, Turkey.

== Collections ==
Eskenazi's work is held in the following collections:

- Baku, Azerbaijan, 1992, Brooklyn Museum, New York.
- Leica Gallery, New York.
