= Kei Ito =

Japanese photographer and installation artist (born 1991)

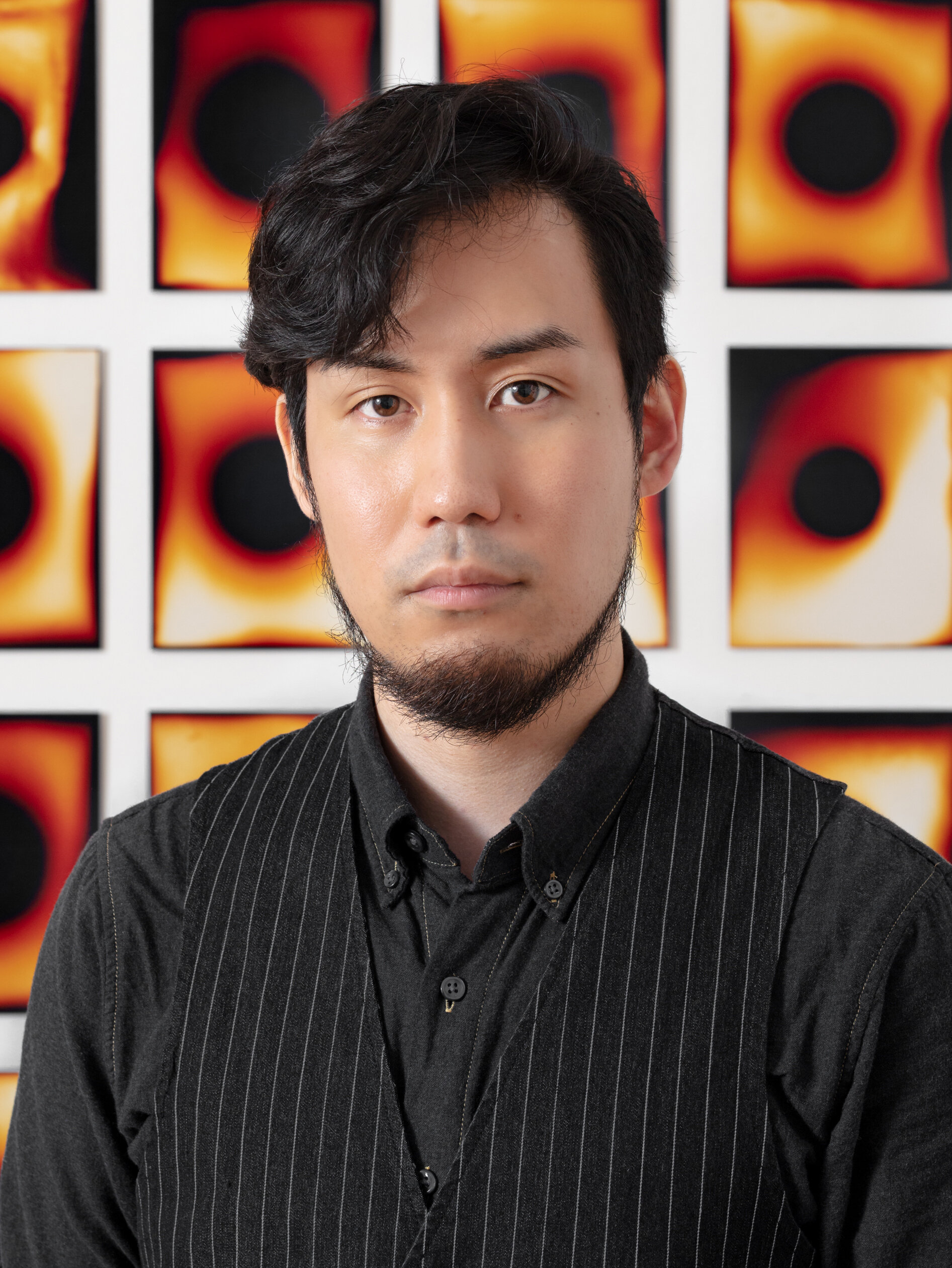
- Ito in 2021
- Born: 20 February 1991 (age 35)
- Occupations: Visual artist, photographer, installation artist
- Known for: Photography, installation art, conceptual art

Kei Ito (伊東 慧, Itō Kei; born 20 February 1991) is a Japanese visual artist working primarily with installation art and experimental photography currently based in the United States. He is most known for his Sungazing, Afterimage Requiem, and Burning Away series.

== Themes and inspiration ==
Ito's work addresses issues of deep intergenerational loss and connections as he explores the materiality and experimental processes of photography, visualizing the invisible: radiation, memory and life/death.

Ito's work, fundamentally rooted in the trauma and legacy passed down from his late grandfather ( Takeshi Ito )—a survivor of the atomic bombing of Hiroshima—, meditates on the complexity of his identity and heritage through examining the past and current threats of nuclear disaster and his present status as a US immigrant.

Many of Ito's artworks transformed both art and non-art spaces into temporal monuments that became platforms for the audience to explore social issues and the memorials dedicated to the losses suffered from the consequences of those issues.

== Exhibitions ==
Ito has shown in over 60 exhibitions worldwide. Among those are solo exhibitions at prominent spaces such as the Georgia Museum of Art, Athens, GA; Southeastern Center for Contemporary Art Museum, Winston-Salem, NC; Masur Museum of Art, Monroe, LA; IA&A at Hillyer (Hillyer Art Space), DC; and Manifest Gallery, Cincinnati, OH. Group exhibitions of note include: the Norton Museum of Art, West Palm Beach, FL; Ethan Cohen KuBe, NY; the Walters Museum of Art, Baltimore, MD; Museum of Contemporary Photography, Chicago, IL; California Institute of Integral Studies, San Francisco, CA; and PH21 Gallery in Budapest, Hungary.

2024

- Staring at the Face of the Sun, Georgia Museum of Art, GA
- Echoes of the Invisible, Munson-Williams-Proctor Art Institute, NY

2023

- The Beginning, In the Land Around Me, Gregory Allicar Museum/Center for Fine Art Photography, CO
- Each Tolling Sun, Hilliard Art Museum, LA
- Direct Contact: Cameraless Photography Now, Eskenazi Museum of Art, IN

2022

- Teach Me How to Love This World, Stamp Gallery at University of Maryland College Park
- The High Wall 2022, Inscape Arts, Washington
- The Heart Isn’t Heart-Shaped, Longwood Center for the Visual Arts, VA

2021

- Aborning New Light, Center for Fine Art Photography, Denver, CO
- Recovery to Normal Existence, The Halide Project, PA
- Our Looming Ground Zero, Creative Alliance, MD
- OD Photo Prize 2021, Open Door Gallery, London, UK
- This Place is a Message, ArtYard Contemporary Art Center, NJ
- Unbound 10!, Candela Gallery, Richmond, VA

2020

- Atomic Sentence, Harmony Hall Regional Center, DC
- Darkest Before Dawn: Art in A Time of Uncertainty, Ethan Cohen KuBe, NY
- Elongated Shadows, Apexart, NY
- What Does Democracy Look Like? Museum of Contemporary Photography, IL
- New Talents: 2020, PEP(Photographic Exploration Project), Berlin

2019

- Archives Aflame, Southeastern Center for Contemporary Art, NC
- Out of the Box: Camera-less Photography, The Norton Museum of Art, FL
- Ghostly Traces: Memory and Mortality in Contemporary Photography, Vicki Myhren Gallery at University of Denver, CO
- Dear Leader, Candela Gallery, Richmond, VA

2018

- InLight Richmond, Virginia Museum of Fine Arts, 1708 Gallery, VA
- Fotofocus Biennial 2018: Nuclear Fallout, Antioch College, OH
- The Noorderlicht Summer: Opera Spanga Aida, Noorderlicht: House of Photography, Netherland
- What Keeps You Up at Night, Mendocino College Art Gallery, Ukiah, CA
- Afterimage Requiem, Baltimore War Memorial, MD
- Only What We Can Carry, IA&A at Hillyer (Hillyer Art Space), DC
- Infertile American Dream, 14x48 Art Billboard, 215 Woodpoint Rd, Brooklyn
- Atomic Traces, Online sponsored by 14x48.org Art Billboard

2017

- Re:Collection, Museum of Contemporary Photography at Columbia College, Chicago, IL
- 3rd International Exhibition on Conceptual Art, CICA Museum, South Korea
- 54th Annual Group Exhibition, Masur Museum of Art, LA
- Wave Pool 44th Group Exhibition, Field Projects Chelsea Gallery, NY

== Residencies ==
2025

- Light Work, NY

2024

- Millay Arts Core Residency, NY

2023

- Santa Fe Art Institute, NM: Changing Climate Residency

2022

- FAR & Away Remote AIR at Florida State University

2021

- MASS MoCA Studio Artist in Residency, MA
- Denis Roussel Fellowship at the Center for Fine Art Photography, CO

2020

- Marva and John Warnock Biennial AIR, University of Utah, UT

2019

- The Center for Photography at Woodstock (CPW) Artist in Residency, NY

== Awards ==
2023

- ROTLICHT Main Exhibition Award Recipient, Academy of Fine Arts Vienna
- Grants for Arts Projects, National Endowment for the Arts (NEA) through the Center for Fine Art Photography (The Beginning, In the Land Around Me).

2022

- CPA Artist Grants, Center for Photographic Art, CA
- ACP Equity Scholarship, Atlanta Celebrates Photography, GA
- Baker Artist Award (Multi-disciplinary) Finalist, GCBA, MA

2021

- OD Photo Prize - Judges’ Picks Award, Open Door Gallery, UK
- The Candela Collection Acquisition Award, Candela Gallery, VA
- The Critical Mass 2021 TOP 50, PhotoLucida, OR
- Contemporary Art Purchasing Program, University of Maryland: Stamp Gallery, MD
- FCA Emergency Project Grant, Foundation for Contemporary Arts, NY
- Denis Roussel Fellowship, The Center for Fine Art Photography, CO

2020

- The Marva and John Warnock Biennial Award, University of Utah, UT

2019

- Artist in Residence at Center for Photography at Woodstock
- Semifinalist for the 14th Janet & Walter Sondheim Prize, Baltimore, MD
- Artist in Residence at Creative Alliance, Baltimore, MD

2018

- Individual Artist Award: Photography, Maryland Arts State Council, MD
- Artist in Residence at Creative Alliance, Baltimore, MD

2017

- Working Artist Photography Award/Grant, Working Artist Org, WA
- Honorable Mention for INFOCUS Sidney Zuber Photography Award, Phoenix Art Museum, AZ
- Maryland representative Artist for The States Project, Lenscratch

2016

- 7th Manifest One Award, Manifest Gallery, Cincinnati, OH
- Rubys Artist Project Grants: Full grant recipient, GBCA
- Honorable Mention for IPA: International Photography Awards
- 4th Annual New York Times Portfolio Review recipient
- Shortlisted for Royal Photography Society Annual print exhibition, UK
- Snider Prize honorable mention
- Awards for Innovations in Imaging awarded by Society of Photographic Education
- Shortlisted for Royal Photographic Society Annual print exhibition, UK
- Shortlisted for Tokyo International Foto Awards
- Honorable Mention Award at 53rd Annual Juried Exhibition at Masur Museum, Monroe, Louisiana

== Publications ==
- Washington Post, In the galleries: Multimedia show explores the nuances of Black life: A creative interpretation of Hiroshima by Mark Jenkins
- BmoreArt, Building Blocks of Narratives: New Solo Exhibits by Kei Ito and R.L. Tillman by Fanni Somogyi
- Hyperallergic, Kei Ito Traces Tragedy and Mourning by Dereck Stafford Mangus
- Strange Fire Collective, Q&A: THE HIGH WALL: KEI ITO By Jesse Egner and Kelly Lee Webeck
- Silver Eye Center for Photography, 2022 Silver List by The Black List
- PhotoLucida, 2022 Critical Mass Top 50 Photographers
- Catalyst Contemporary 2021 Catalog
- It's Nice That, Kei Ito builds an exhibition space around his grandfather’s survival of Hiroshima by Dalia Al-Dujaili
- Postdigital Science and Education, Simple, Dark, and Deep: Photographic Theorizations of As-Yet Schools by Sarah Pfohl
- Denverite, On the anniversary of the first nuclear test, an artist and third-generation Hiroshima victim imagines a nuclear-free world by Maggie Donahue
- Candela Gallery, Photography is Dead, Long Live Photography Exhibition Catalog
- BmoreArt, Art and: Kei Ito - Ito’s work tells how people were affected by nuclear warfare, and how we could be affected again by Suzy Kopf
- e-flux, Elongated Shadows by apexart
- apexart - Elongated Shadows by Liz Faust
- Hyperallergic, Review: In the Shadow of the Atomic Bomb, Artists Respond by Ilana Novick
- Strange Fire Collective, In This Body of Mine at Milwaukee Institute of Art & Design
- Studio Magazine (University of Utah), 2020 Warnock AIR Interview: All That Can Happen In a Single Breath by Marina Gomberg, 2020, printed
- Washington City Paper, The Best Photo Exhibits of 2018 by Louis Jacobson
- Exposure Magazine/Medium, Art of the Atomic Legacy: the Work of Kei Ito
- BBC World News and BBC Culture/Art interviewed about Afterimage Requiem exhibition.
- Washington Post Magazine published an article about the project Afterimage Requiem
- The Baltimore Sun Newspaper featured the project Afterimage Requiem on the front article
- Washington Post reviewed the solo exhibition at Hillyer Art Space in DC
- Strange Fire Collective Q&A: KEI ITO
- Velocity Magazine Making Meaning of the Atomic Bomb
- Art Maze Magazine International Issue 3: Summer, 2 page spread
- Featured on the Chicago Magazine The 5 Biggest Buys by Chicago Art Museum in 2016

== Collections ==
- Georgia Museum of Art
- Eskenazi Museum of Art
- Gregory Allicar Museum of Art
- Norton Museum of Art
- Museum of Contemporary Photography in Chicago
- Center for Photography at Woodstock
- Candela Collection
- Stamp Gallery at University of Maryland
- Rochester Institute of Technology
- Maryland Institute College of Art
- En Foco
- Chroma / California Institute of Integral Studies

== Art Fairs ==
- 2023 Art on Paper
- 2021 Art Miami

== Education ==
- Masters of Fine Arts in Photographic and Electronic Media from the Maryland Institute College of Art, 2016
- Bachelors of Arts in Fine Art Photography from Rochester Institute of Technology, 2014
