= Saleh Rozati =

Iranian Austrian Actor & multi-medium artist

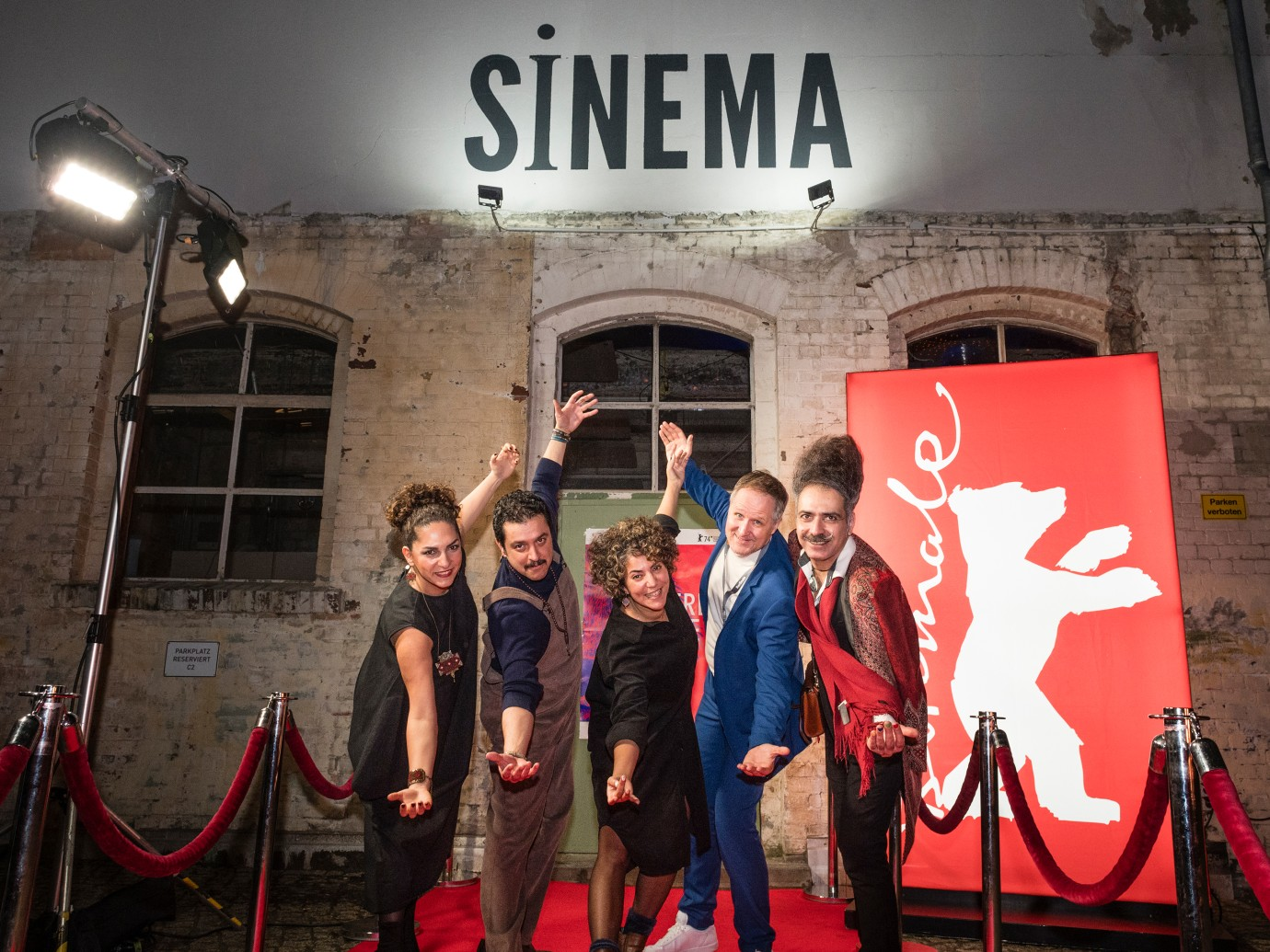
- Rozati on the red carpet at Berlinale-before screening at the entrance of Sinema Transtopia Berlin.
- Born: 17 August 1982 (age 44); Isfahan, Iran
- Education: University of Applied Arts Vienna, Academy of Fine Arts Vienna
- Known for: Acting, photography, Performance, painting
- Notable work: Don Bohlul from Isfahan series
- Awards: Sony world photo Awards (2015)

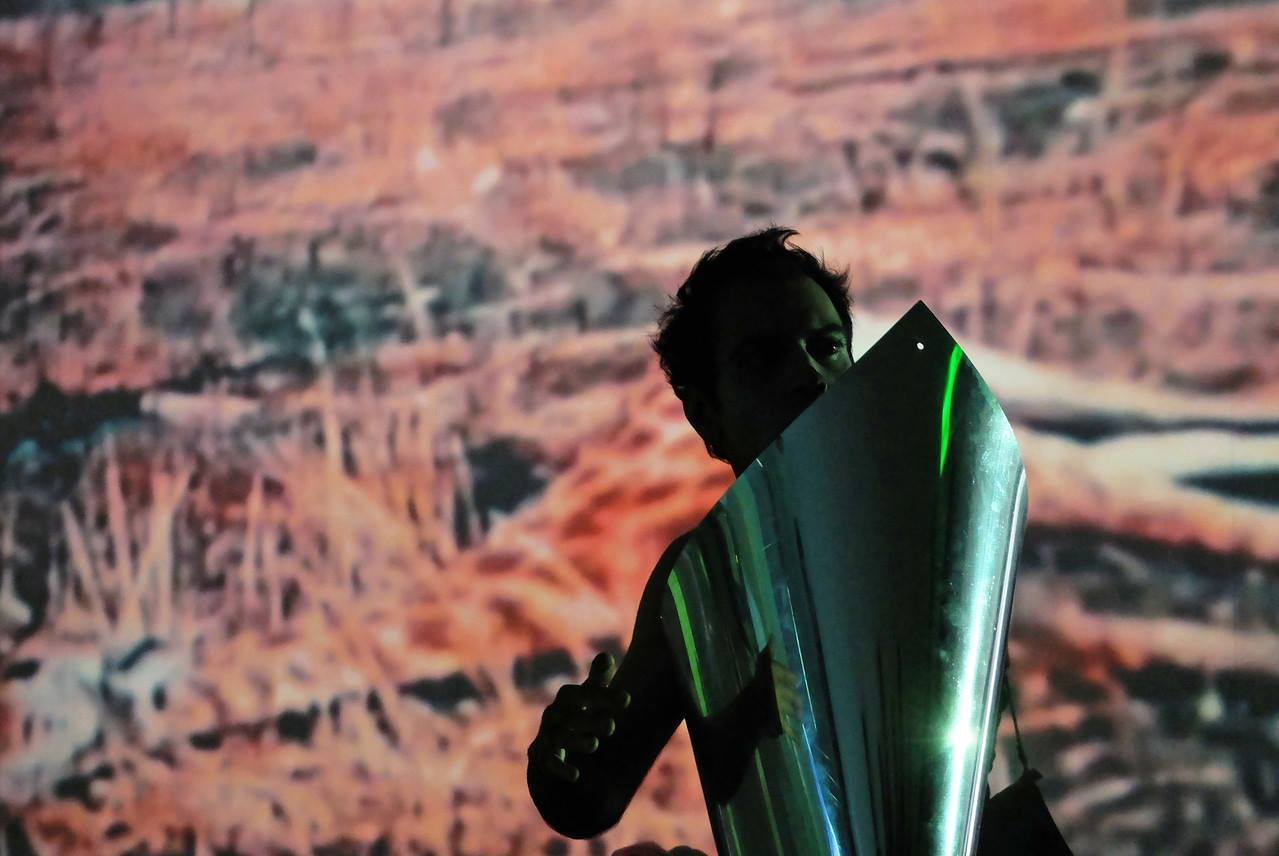
Saleh Rozati performing with KJDT Performance group "Wie die Blümlein draußen zittern", 1. und 2. November 2013 Freies Theater Innsbruck

Saleh Rozati (Persian: صالح روضاتی, born 17 August 1982) is an Iranian/Austrian actor, artist, photographer, stage designer, performing artist, and musician based in Austria.

== Biography ==
He was born on 17 August 1982 in Isfahan, Iran. Rozati graduated MA from Academy of Fine Arts Vienna.

He got Sony World Photography Awards 2015 in People Category.

He acted in Shahid Film as storyteller.

== Exhibitions ==
- 2017 – Austrian Days in Gdańsk-Gdynia
- 2015 – Sony World Foto Award 2015, Sumerset house, London
- 2010 – Preview of the past
- 2008 – The First Annual Detroit .gif Group Show – Stockholm

== Filmography ==
=== Film ===
Year	Title	Role	Notes
2024	Shahid	PardehKhan	
2023-2024	Happyland	Cello player from London	
2011	A Man Who...	the Man	

== Awards ==
- 1st Place, Sony World PhotographyAwards, People Category
- 1st Place, "Lichtfarben" international photography competition 2009
