= Ernesto Bazan =

Italian photographer

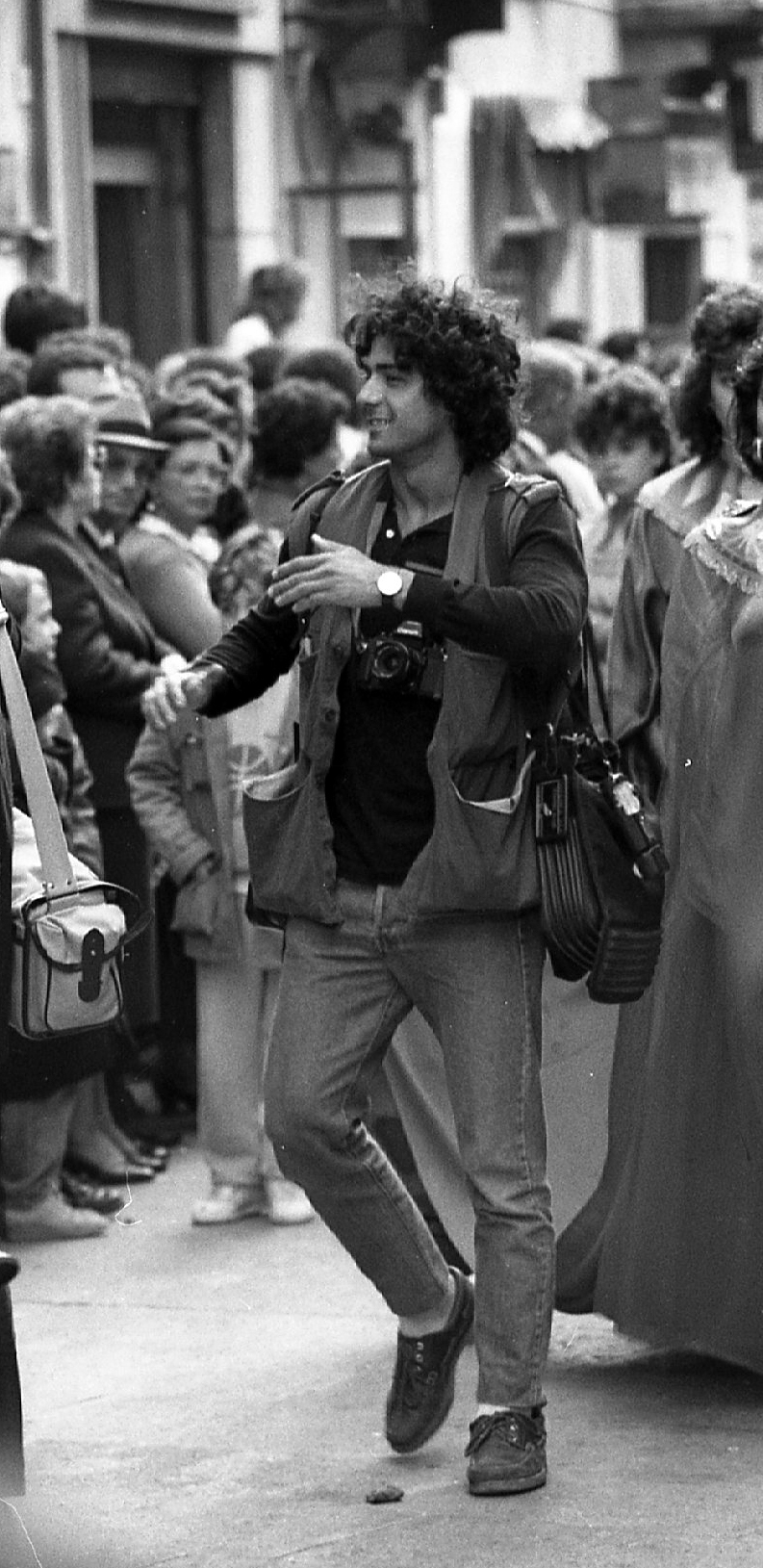
Ernesto Bazan. Marsala, April 1987

Ernesto Bazan (born 1959) is an Italian photographer, living in the United States. Cuba has been a major subject of his work. Bazan has received a 1st prize at the World Press Photo contest, the Lange-Taylor Prize, and the W. Eugene Smith Grant. He has had a solo exhibition at the Art Museum of the Americas in Washington, D.C. and his work is in the collections of the Art Institute of Chicago, Museum of Fine Arts, Houston, and San Francisco Museum of Modern Art.

== Early life ==
Bazan was born and grew up in Palermo, Sicily. His father was a doctor.

He started taking photographs as a teenager and at age 17 decided to become a photographer. Two years later, he moved to New York City to study photography and began working internationally.

== Life and work ==
He first traveled to Cuba in 1992 and lived there until 2006. He married a Cuban woman, Sissy, and became a father to twin boys, Stefano and Pietro. He and his family moved to Veracruz, Mexico "after suspicious authorities disapproved of his photography classes, which they thought were unauthorized journalism seminars". His self-published Cuba trilogy includes the "melancholy, gritty urban world" of Bazan: Cuba (2008) in black-and-white; the Cuban countryside in colour in Al Campo (2011); and Isla (2014), containing black-and-white panoramas. In 2014, they moved to Jersey City, USA. In 2016, after the death of Fidel Castro, Bazan again visited Cuba which provided the material for the book 25 de Noviembre (2020).

Before You Grow Up (2017) is a family album for his sons. In it, "photographs are mixed with drawings, letters, his mother's journal entries, memorabilia and notebook pages." According to James Estrin in The New York Times, Before You Grow Up "captures the joys and sorrows of 21st-century family life" and "is about the importance of family and the fragility of life".

== Publications ==
- The Perpetual Past. Palermo: Novecento, 1985. ISBN 978-8837300241. With an introduction by Jerre Mangione.
- Passing Through (1992) ISBN 9788885121119.
- Bazan: Cuba. Self-published, 2008.
- Al Campo. Self-published, 2011. ISBN 978-0979830334. With an afterword by Colin Westerbeck.
- Isla. Self-published, 2014.
- Before You Grow Up. Self-published, 2017. Photographs "mixed with drawings, letters, his mother's journal entries, memorabilia and notebook pages."
- 25 de Noviembre (2020)

== Awards ==
- 1995: 1st prize, Daily Life category, 1996 World Press Photo Contest, Amsterdam, Netherlands
- 1997: Lange-Taylor Prize with Silvana Paternostro, from the Center for Documentary Studies at Duke University, Durham, NC for El Periodo Especial
- 1998: W. Eugene Smith Grant from the W. Eugene Smith Memorial Fund
- 2000: Guggenheim Fellowship from the John Simon Guggenheim Memorial Foundation, New York City

== Exhibitions ==
- Raw Poetry: Ernesto Bazan and Cuba, Art Museum of the Americas, Washington, D.C., September 2023 – January 2024

== Collections ==
Bazan's work is held in the following permanent collections:

- Art Institute of Chicago, Chicago, IL: 4 prints (as of 21 March 2024)
- Museum of Fine Arts, Houston, TX: 2 prints (as of 21 March 2024)
- San Francisco Museum of Modern Art, San Francisco, CA: 2 prints (as of 21 March 2024)
