= The Street (2019 film) =

Documentary by Zed Nelson

- Poster
- Directed by: Zed Nelson
- Produced by: Zed Nelson
- Cinematography: Zed Nelson
- Edited by: Julian Rodd
- Music by: Rachel Portman
- Release date: 2019
- Running time: 94 minutes
- Country: England
- Language: English

The Street is a 2019 documentary about gentrification in London, made by Zed Nelson. For several years he interviewed people who lived and worked on Hoxton Street, a shopping street in the East End of London. The initially unfunded film was praised by critics.

== Synopsis ==
In 2015, Zed Nelson began to film a documentary about the gentrification of Hoxton Street, a traditionally working-class East End shopping street in Hoxton, in the London Borough of Hackney. He interviewed people who had lived and worked there for decades, such as the proprietors of a family-run pie and mash shop, a garage-owning car mechanic, a carpet salesman and a woman in her eighties. They reflect upon how the area has changed since the 1940s, as the street's proximity to the financial centre of the City of London caused an inexorable increase in property prices. The long-term residents complain about newer residents, although one interviewee remembers racist attacks by the National Front in the 1970s.

As filming progresses over several years, the elderly woman declines in health, the carpet shop shuts down and the garage-owner is forced to sell his property to developers. The documentary charts the rapid gentrification of the area, also interviewing people involved with other projects on the street such as a church, a free food cafe, an art gallery, an estate agents and a craft beer shop. In addition, Nelson meets representatives of Aviva, which has an expanding corporate campus on nearby Hoxton Square and a Stendhal-quoting homeless man who sleeps under a bridge. The reactions of the various interviewees to both the Brexit referendum in 2016 and the Grenfell Tower fire in 2017 are recorded. Khadija Saye, a young woman involved in the art gallery on the street died with her mother in the fire and the film records a community garden being named in her memory.

== Production ==
From the age of five, Zed Nelson grew up in Hackney, east London, where he still lives. He published his third photographic monograph in 2014, entitled A Portrait of Hackney (Hoxton Mini Press). He then began filming The Street as a personal project in 2015, working on it until 2019. The film was not commissioned and initially had no funding. Later the Museum of London gave Nelson a grant for editing and acquired the film for its collection.

== Release ==
The Street received a cinematic release in November 2019. The DVD was brought out in March 2020, when the film was also acquired by streaming services such as Amazon Prime, Curzon Home Cinema, i-Tunes and Google Play.

== Critical response ==
The documentary received generally favourable reviews from critics, The Observer calling it a "poignant stroll through a disappearing world". The Guardian appreciated the focus on the people living in the local area and the Time Out review said the documentary was "refreshingly complex", commenting that "What makes The Street so refreshing is Nelson’s even-handedness in exposing flaws in both sides' arguments". The Arts Desk enjoyed the music by Rachel Portman and stated "Nelson listens, patiently, to all who will talk to him". Whilst lauding the film for tracking the gentrification process as it happened, Empire found "little variety among the various locals' complaints".
