= David Delaney Mayer =

American documentary filmmaker and social entrepreneur

- Born: David Delany Mayer; 1992; America
- Occupation(s): social entrepreneur, filmmaker

David Delaney Mayer (born 1992) is an American documentary filmmaker and social entrepreneur. Mayer produced/directed the PBS special limited series, "Food Town," as well as Complex Network's "Road to Raceday." Mayer is the co-founder of DreamxAmerica, a Harvard Innovation Lab-based social enterprise joining filmmaking and impact investing to highlight and support immigrant entrepreneurs.

A former Duke University men's basketball player under Coach Mike Krzyzewski, Mayer quit the team after his first year to pursue film. He graduated with a focus in documentary filmmaking, where he was awarded the Center for Documentary Studies’ Julia Harper Day Award and Benenson Award in the Arts.

== Honor ==
In December 2019, Mayer was named as one of Forbes' 30 under 30 in Law and Policy.
