= Brad Kessler =

American novelist

- Born: 1963 (age 62–63)
- Education: Wesleyan University
- Occupation: Novelist
- Spouse: Dona Ann McAdams

Brad Kessler (born 1963) is an American novelist and non-fiction writer whose work has been translated into several languages. He is best known for his novel Birds in Fall which won the Dayton Literary Peace Prize and his memoir Goat Song about living with goats and the culture of pastoralism.

== Education ==
Kessler attended Wesleyan University where he studied with the writer Annie Dillard.

== Career ==
In his early career he worked as a magazine journalist and an editor at Interview. He also wrote scripts for Rabbit Ears Production that were recorded by Denzel Washington, Ben Kingsley, John Cleese, Susan Sarandon, and Danny Glover.

In 2001, Scribner published his first novel Lick Creek, set in West Virginia in the nineteen twenties.

His second novel, Birds In Fall, was published in 2006 by Scribner. Set on a remote island off Nova Scotia, the novel is a retelling of the Greek myth of the Halcyon days. It follows the grief and recovery of ornithologist Anna Gathreaux and an international cast of characters after the crash of Swissair flight 111. Birds in Fall earned Kessler a National Endowment for the Arts Fellowship, a Whiting Writer's Award, and a Rome Prize from the American Academy of Arts and Letters. It went on to win the 2007 Dayton Literary Peace Prize for fiction.

Kessler's memoir, Goat Song; A Seasonal Life, A Short History of Herding, and the Art of Making Cheese was published by Scribner in 2009. The book, consisting of small chapters in mixed-essay form, follows Kessler's initiation into the life of herding goats and making cheese and his simultaneous discovery of the pastoralist roots of much of Western culture today, from its alphabet and economy to its religions and poetry.

Kessler's third novel, North, was published in 2021 by The Overlook Press. It takes place in a Vermont monastery and follows the encounter of a Catholic monk and a Somali refugee denied asylum in the United States. Kessler spent ten years writing the book, staying for stretches in monasteries and working closely with the Somali community in Burlington, Vermont, as well as the Vermont Office of the United States Committee on Refugees and Immigrants in Colchester, Vermont, to whom he donated the proceeds of the book.

Kessler and Dona Ann McAdams collaborated on a photography-text project, the Garden of Eden that documented the lives of people living with severe mental illness in an adult home on Coney Island where McAdams worked for decades offering art therapy. The Garden of Eden won the 2002 Lange-Taylor Prize from Duke University's The Center for Documentary Studies. The couple also co-authored A Woodcutter's Christmas (Council Oaks Books, 2001), Kessler fictional text based on McAdams' photo series of discarded Christmas trees on the streets of New York City.

Kessler teaches creative writing at the MFA program at Antioch University, Los Angeles. He is a graduate of the Harvard Program in Refugee Trauma.

== Personal life ==
Kessler is married to the photographer-activist Dona Ann McAdams. In 1998, Kessler and McAdams moved to Sandgate, Vermont where they eventually raised dairy goats and became farmers and licensed cheesemakers. Their transition from work on paper to works on the land, and the blending of the two, culture and agriculture, is an ongoing project of their Northern Spy Farm.
