= Gun Nation =

- Directed by: Zed Nelson
- Produced by: Zed Nelson
- Edited by: Noah Payne Frank
- Release date: 16 September 2016
- Running time: 30 minutes
- Country: United Kingdom

Gun Nation is a 2016 documentary film directed and produced by British photographer and filmmaker Zed Nelson. The film explores issues surrounding gun ownership, gun violence, and gun culture in the United States and marks 18 years since the director's award-winning photography book of the same name. It was commissioned by The Guardian and by the Bertha Foundation, executive produced by Charlie Phillips and released online on 16 September 2016. The film was the first production to be screened in the documentary section of The Guardian.
