= Dona Ann McAdams =

American photographer

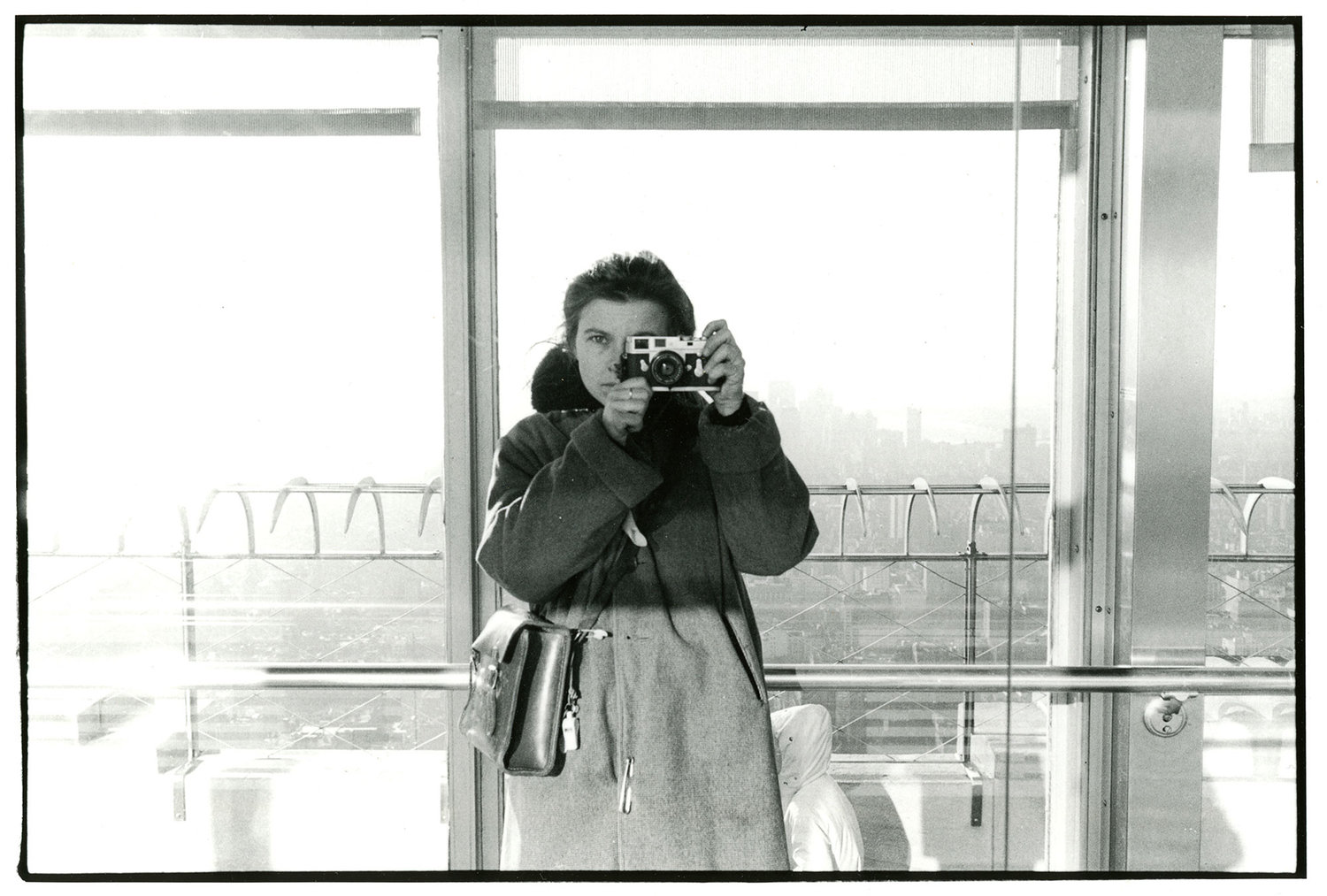
- Self Portrait, Empire State Building, NYC, 1981
- Born: Dona Ann McAdams; July 11, 1954; Cambria Heights, Queens, New York, USA
- Known for: Photography
- Spouse: Brad Kessler
- Awards: Lange-Taylor Prize, Obie Award, Bessie Award
- Website: www.donaannmcadams.com

Dona Ann McAdams (born 1954) is an American photographer known for her images of performance art, street activism, farm animals, and members of underrecognized communities, including backstretch workers at the Saratoga Race Course, Appalachian farmers, people living with severe mental illness on Coney Island, and cloistered nuns. She makes black and white photographs with a Leica M2.

In 2002 McAdams, along with her husband Brad Kessler, received the Dorothea Lange—Paul Taylor Prize.

== Early life and education ==
Dona Ann McAdams was born in 1954 in Cambria Heights, Queens, New York, and moved to Lake Ronkonkoma, New York when she was 6. She moved to San Francisco in 1973, where she met Harvey Milk, then a camera shop owner making his first run for office. Her friendship with Milk "taught her to use her art for social change." From 1974 to 1977, she sat in on classes at the San Francisco Art Institute. McAdams holds an MFA from Rutgers and a BA from Empire State University. After Milk's assassination in 1978, she moved back East to New York City.

== Career ==
McAdams has been described as a "social documentarian" and a "street activist" with "an eerie ability to encounter the influential movers and events of the day no matter where she was, from San Francisco to Australia to Central America." Her activist photography includes images of "queer liberation, ACT UP, antinuclear, and pro-choice protests," described as "agitprop work that is of its time, but timeless." McAdams was the house photographer for Performance Space New York (formerly called P.S. 122) for 23 years, from 1983 to 2006. She also made photographs at the WOW Café, St. Mark's Church-in-the-Bowery, La MaMa Experimental Theatre Club, and many other New York City performance art venues. During this time period, her subjects included Eileen Myles, Meredith Monk, Karen Finley, and David Wojnarowicz. Her work has been exhibited widely, nationally and internationally, at places such as the Museum of Modern Art, The Whitney Museum of American Art, The International Center of Photography, the Pratt Manhattan Gallery, and The Museum of Contemporary Art, Los Angeles. Her photography has been included in numerous group exhibitions, including Whose Streets? Our Streets! (2017) and Art After Stonewall (2019).

McAdams' work has appeared in numerous publications, including The New York Times, Artforum, DoubleTake, and Aperture. McAdams' work features prominently in José Esteban Muñoz's Disidentifications (1999)

Her book Black Box: A Photographic Memoir is an autobiography in two parts, one a retrospective of her photographic work, the other a series of prose memoirs.

== Teaching ==
She has taught and lectured at, among other places, Rutgers University, New York University, The International Center for Photography, The American Center in Barcelona, Spain, and Hostos Community College in New York City. She has also taught photography in a wide range of "underserved communities across the US—from dairy farms in New England to mountain towns in Southern Appalachia—empowering people to take their own photographs and preserve their memories." In 1998, McAdams helped create the photography program at The Point in Hunts Point, South Bronx. She created and oversaw community darkrooms for the Williamsburg District Historical Foundation in Williamsburg, West Virginia, for Hospital Audiences Inc. in mental health facilities, homeless shelters, and senior homes throughout the New York City area, and at the Warren-Washington Association for Mental Health (now called ASCEND Mental Wellness) in Glens Falls, New York (where she was awarded the Dorothea Dix Community Service Award). She ran a school photography program for youth for the Creative Time Forty Second Street Project in New York. Through The Triage Project, she worked with a collective of artists, doctors, and medical professionals who used photography to illustrate problems with health care in New York City.

== The Sendak Fellowship ==
In 2009, Maurice Sendak enlisted the help of Dona Ann McAdams as well as his longtime assistant, Lynn Caponera, to help realize his vision of a residency for illustrators, and in 2010, The Sendak Fellowship was founded. Dona Ann McAdams was its director until 2017. In 2018, The Sendak Fellowship received an Angel award from the Eric Carle Museum of Picture Book Art.

== Personal life ==
McAdams has collaborated with and is married to Brad Kessler. They live on a goat farm in Vermont.

== Publications ==
=== Books ===
- Black Box: A Photographic Memoir
- Caught in the Act: A Look at Contemporary Multimedia Performance
- The Woodcutter's Christmas, a collaboration with Brad Kessler. Council Oak Books, 2001.
  - The Woodcutter's Christmas: A Classic Holiday Fable. Galpón, 2025.

=== Exhibition catalogues ===
- The Garden of Eden. Robert B. Menschel Photography Gallery at Syracuse University, 1997. About people living with schizophrenia.
- Some Women. Opalka Gallery of The Sage Colleges, 2009. Catalogue for a 35-year survey of her work.
- A View from the Backstretch. National Museum of Racing and Hall of Fame, 2011. In conjunction with an exhibition of her photography workshops with backstretch workers at the Saratoga Racetrack.
- Dona Ann McAdams: Performative Acts. Brattleboro Museum & Art Center. In conjunction with a retrospective exhibition, curated by John Killacky, that toured to five Vermont venues, 2019–2021.

=== Artists' books ===
- The Nuclear Survival Kit
- Alphabet City
- The Barbie Book
- Olympic City

=== Publications with contributions by McAdams ===
- Disidentifications: Queers of Color and the Performance of Politics (1999) by José Esteban Muñoz
- The Body in the O (2019) by Tim Miller
- We Are Everywhere (2019) by Matthew Riemer and Leighton Brown
- Let the Record Show (2021) by Sarah Schulman

== Awards ==
- 2002: Dorothea Lange—Paul Taylor Prize, with her husband Brad Kessler, from the Center for Documentary Studies at Duke University
- Obie Award
- Bessie Award for her performance photography
- Grant, Mid Atlantic Arts Foundation
- Grant, National Endowment for the Arts
- Grant, Vermont Arts Council

== Collections ==
McAdams's work is held in the following permanent collections:

- Museum of Modern Art, New York
- Metropolitan Museum of Art, New York
- The Print Club of New York
