= Rory Doyle =

American photographer

Rory Doyle (born October 15, 1983) is an American photographer, based in Cleveland, Mississippi. Doyle's ongoing project, Delta Hill Riders, about African American cowboys and cowgirls has won Smithsonian magazine's annual Photo Contest and the Zeiss Photography Award at the Sony World Photography Awards.

He studied journalism at Saint Michael's College, Vermont.

== Awards ==
- 2018: Grand Prize winner, Smithsonian magazine's annual Photo Contest, for a photograph from Delta Hill Riders
- 2018: Winner, The Photojournalist category, EyeEm Awards, Berlin
- 2019: Winner, Zeiss Photography Award, Sony World Photography Awards, World Photography Organisation, for Delta Hill Riders
- 2019: Shortlisted, Taylor Wessing Photographic Portrait Prize, London, for a photograph from Delta Hill Riders
- 2020: Finalist, Head On Portrait award, Head On Photo Awards, Head On Photo Festival, for a photograph from Delta Hill Riders
