= Takeshi Ito (activist) =

Japanese economist and peace activist (1929–2000)

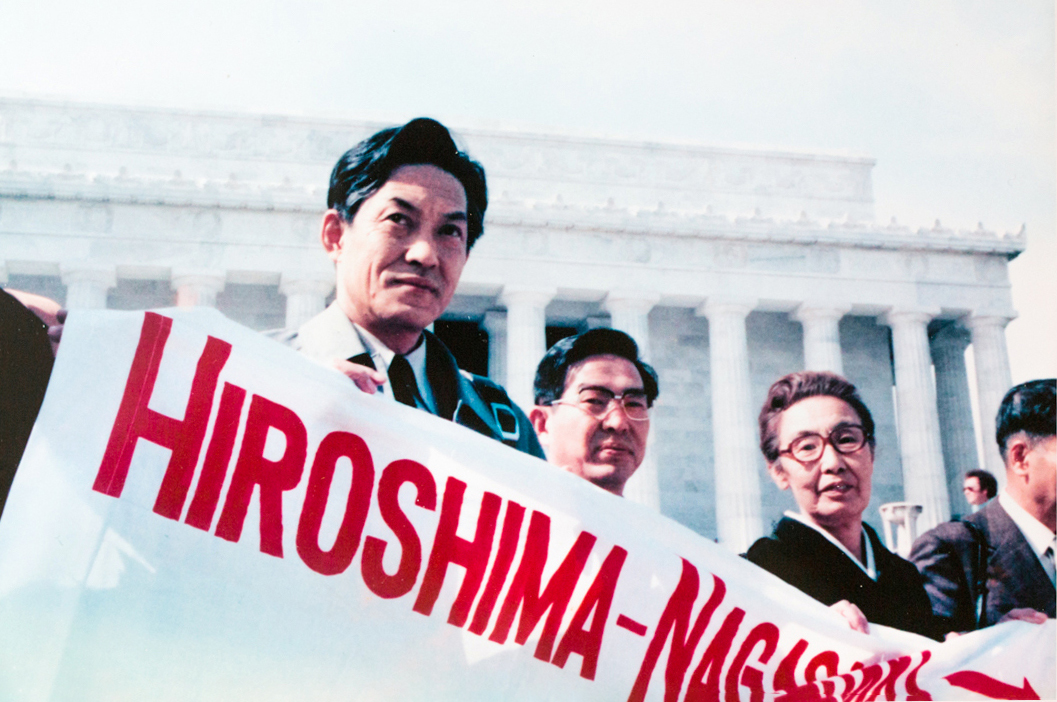
- Takeshi Ito at the October 1976 anti-nuclear protest in Washington D.C.
- Born: 5 October 1929
- Died: 3 March 2000 (aged 70)
- Occupations: Peace activist and economist

Takeshi Ito (Japanese: 伊東壮; 5 October 1929 – 3 March 2000) was a Japanese economist and peace activist. He served as the president of the University of Yamanashi, a representative committee member of the Japan Confederation of A- and H-Bomb Sufferers Organizations (Nihon Hidankyo) that won the Nobel Prize in 2024, and the chairman of the Tokyo Confederation of A-Bomb Sufferers Organizations.

== Biography ==
He was born in Hiroshima City. In his third year at the former Hiroshima Prefectural First Middle School, he was exposed to the atomic bomb. In 1959, he completed graduate studies at the Graduate School of Economics at Hitotsubashi University, where he studied under Kazushi Ohkawa.

After serving as a teacher at a Tokyo metropolitan high school, he became a faculty member at Yamanashi University in 1965. He held positions such as Dean of the Faculty of Education at Yamanashi University, President of Yamanashi University (1992–98), and representative committee member of Nihon Hidankyo (1981–2000). He was also the chairman of the Tokyo Confederation of A-Bomb Sufferers Organizations (Toyo-kai) and a special committee member of the Large-Scale Retail Store Council at the Ministry of International Trade and Industry.

In 1958, he was involved in founding the Association of A-Bomb Survivors in Kunitachi, Tokyo. From then on, he engaged in activities aiming to abolish nuclear weapons and establish a law for supporting A-bomb survivors based on national compensation. In 1976, then a Secretary of Nihon Hidankyo, he "took part in the second people’s delegation to the U.N., along with several Hibakusha representatives from different parts of Japan. The delegation submitted “A Report to the U.N. Secretary General: the Damage and Aftereffects from the Atomic Bombs on Hiroshima and Nagasaki”, and requested the U.N. to hold an international symposium in Japan with the participation of experts, to explore the impact of the atomic bombing and the situation of surviving victims. This request was not met by the U.N., but in 1977, the “International Symposium on the Damage and After-effects of the Atomic Bombing of Hiroshima and Nagasaki” was held by the U.N. Special NGO Committee for Disarmament."

In 1988, he gave a speech at the NGO Day of the 3rd UN Special Session on Disarmament at the United Nations headquarters, calling for the abolition of nuclear weapons while A-bomb survivors were still alive. In 1995, during the hearings at the International Court of Justice in The Hague, Netherlands on whether the use of nuclear weapons violated international humanitarian law, he argued against the legality of nuclear weapons.

Together with Tadao Ishida (Professor Emeritus at Hitotsubashi University) and Masaharu Hamaya (Professor Emeritus at Hitotsubashi University), he conducted research and analysis on the true nature of A-bomb damage from a sociological perspective. He pointed out that the atomic bomb brought about a "total collapse" of the body, life, and spirit for the survivors, influencing the ideological understanding of the A-bomb experience. In the field of economics, he specialized in economic policy and regional economics, mainly conducting statistical analyses of the regional economy in Yamanashi, and published papers and research reports.

His grandson, Kei Ito, is currently an artist in the United States, creating works that focus on nuclear issues, history, and memory in contemporary society.

== Major publications ==
- 6 August 1945 – Hiroshima Keeps Telling(1979, new edition 1989) Iwanami Shoten
- Fifty Years of A-Bomb Survivors (1988) Iwanami Shoten
- Is Nuclear Really Safe? – Considering the History and Future of Nuclear Power (1990) Poplar Publishing
- How to Live in the Nuclear Age (1991, edited) Poplar Publishing
- From Hiroshima and Nagasaki to the World and the Future (1985) Keiso Shobo
- Thoughts and Movements of A-Bomb Survivors – For the A-Bomb Survivors' Support Law (1975) Shin Hyoron
- The Recommendation of Changing Jobs – Talents and Environment in Occupations (1963) Daiwa Shobo
- Environment and Economy (1984)
- Taisho Culture (1965/1987, new edition, co-authored with Hiroshi Minami) Keiso Shobo
- The Global Environment and Human Society (1993, co-authored) Yamanashi Nichi Nichi Shimbun
- What We Can Do to Clean the Air (1994, supervised) Poplar Publishing
- The Economy of Yamanashi Prefecture (1995, edited) Yamanashi 21st Century Industrial Development Organization

== See also ==
- Anti-nuclear movement
- Anti-nuclear power movement in Japan
- International Campaign to Abolish Nuclear Weapons
- Treaty on the Prohibition of Nuclear Weapons
