= Carole Naggar =

Poet, photography historian, curator and painter

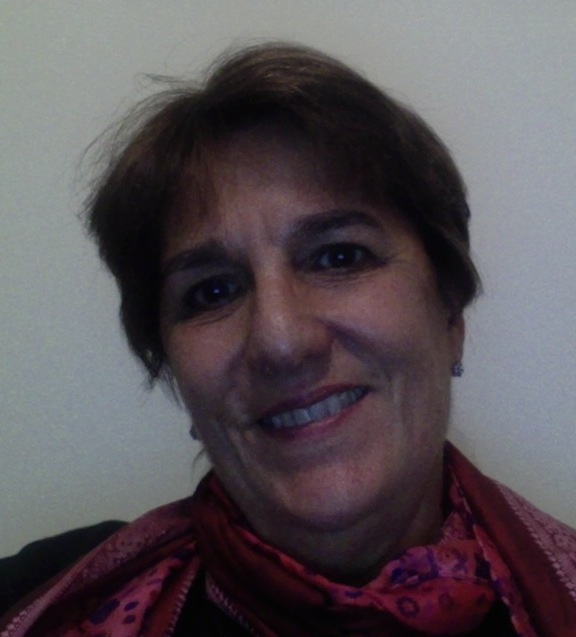
Carole Naggar

Carole Naggar is a poet, photography historian, curator and painter. She is a regular contributor to Aperture, and Time Lightbox, and since 2014 she has been Series Editor for the Magnum Photos Legacy Biography series. She has written biographies of photographers George Rodger, Werner Bischof and David Seymour (photographer). She was the cofounder and Special Projects Editor of Pixelpress from 1999-2006. Born in Egypt, she currently splits her time between New York and Paris.

== Publications ==
=== Photography books ===
- “Saul Leiter: In My Room” (Steidl, 2017). Lead essay
- “Henri Cartier-Bresson: Interviews 1956-1998” (Aperture, Spring 2017)
- “Magnum Photobook: Catalogue raisonné” (Phaidon, 2017). Co-authored with Fred Ritchin.
- “Eve Arnold, An Illustrated Biography” (2015, Magnum) Series Editor.
- “Bruce Davidson, An Illustrated Biography” (2017, Magnum) Series Editor.
- “Bruno Barbey: Passages” (La Martinière, 2015) (Beijing United Publishing Co., 2017)
- “Dennis Stock: Time is on Our Side” (Prestel, 2015)
- “David Seymour: Vies de Chim” (Contrejour Editions, 2014)
- “Chim’s Children of War” (Umbrage Editions, 2013)
- “Christer Stromholm: Passages and Metamorphoses” (Max Strom, 2013)
- “David Seymour” (Photopoche, Delpire/Actes Sud, Fall 2011)
- “The Mexican Suitcase, Catalogue” (ICP/Steidl, Fall 2011) Essay on a never-published 1936 Chim reportage “The Regulares Indigenas: A Forgotten History”
- “Magnum: Contacts” (Thames & Hudson, October 2011) Essays on two of Chim’s contact sheets.
- “Werner Bischof: Carnets de Route” (Editions Delpire, 2008)
- “George Rodger, An Adventurer in Photography” (Syracuse University Press, 2003)
- “Mexico Through Foreign Eyes” (W.W. Norton, 1992)

=== Poetry ===
- “Voyage à Kyoto” (PixelPress, 2015)
- “Haiku de Nuit” (Dobbin Books, 2015)
- “Ukiyo-e, Images of a Floating World” (Studio Equis, 2005)
- “Cité du Sang / Le Bain” (Fanlac Publishers, 1988)
- “Egypte” (Fot’Oeil publishers, 1979)
- “Night Light” (Bordas, 1979)
- “En Blanc” (A/Z Publishers, 1975)

== Exhibits curated ==
- “Magnum Analog Recovery” Exhibit contributor, Paris (2017)
- “Chim’s Children: Hungary, 1948” Budapest (2016)
- “Chim in Mexico: The Gamboa Connection, 1936-1939” Mexico City (2010-2011)
- “Chasing the Dream” United Nations, New York (2005)
- “Linn Sage: American Flag” New York (2005)
- “George Rodger At War” Europe, Japan, Taiwan (2004)
- “John Berger: Drawings” New York (1994-1995)
- “John Berger: Photographs and Texts” New York (1994-1995)
- “Mexico Through Foreign Eyes” United States, Mexico (1993-1996)
- ”Hana Iverson, Photographs” Mexico City (1995)
- “George Rodger: En Afrique” Grenoble (1985)
- “Biennale de Paris: Photography” Paris, (1982)
- “Documents on Minorities”, New York (1982)
- “Christian Boltanski” Lublin (1978)
- “Annette Messager” (1978)

== Honors and awards ==
- Shortlisted for the Historic Book Award, Rencontres d'Arles (2017)
- Member, Oracle Group for Photography Curators (2016)
- The Ansel Adams Scholarship, Center for Creative Photography (Spring 2010)
- The Paul Strand/Virginia Stevens Fund (Spring 2009)
- La Caixa Foundation, Jury for Documentary Awards (2000, 2001)
- Seeds of Peace, Artist-in-Residence (1999)
- The Samuel Rubin Foundation Grant (1994)
- Consultant, International Center of Photography Infinity Awards (1995)
- Bronx Council for the Arts, Grantee and Artist-in-Residence (1994)
- Maine Photography Workshops Golden Light Award, “Best Book in History of Photography” for Mexico Through Foreign Eyes (1993)
- Juror, Mother Jones Award for Documentary Photography, (1990)
- Writer’s Grant, France National Center for Literature (1987, 1981)
- Juror, Grand Prix National de la Photographie (1983-1986) Awards to Robert Doisneau, William Klein and André Kertesz.
- Co-founder, Biennale de la Photographie, Musée d’Art Moderne de la Ville de Paris (1989)
- Member, International Association of Art Critics (1977–present)
