= Center for Fine Art Photography =

Coordinates: 40.592505°N 105.076276°W

The Center for Fine Art Photography
- Interactive map of The Center for Fine Art Photography
- Address: 321 Maple Street (Administration offices); Fort Collins, Colorado; United States
- Capacity: c4fap.org

Construction
- Architect: Check the website for current exhibition location

Website
- www.c4fap.org

The Center for Fine Art Photography is a non-profit exhibition and education space located in Fort Collins, Colorado, United States. The Center was founded in 2004 and features rotating exhibitions of fine art photography by artists from around the world.

== History ==
Founded in 2004 to promote and support the art of photography through exhibitions and educational programs, The Center for Fine Art Photography is a nonprofit organization supported by donations, grants and memberships. The Center's in gallery and online gallery exhibitions gives photographers and photography enthusiasts from all over the globe an opportunity to engage with the Center.

== Exhibitions ==
The Center's exhibitions occur in galleries and other art spaces around Fort Collins and beyond. In addition to solo and group shows, The Center hosts juried exhibitions with esteemed juror's that are gallerist's, curators, editors or a master photographer. Susan Spiritus, Alex Webb and Rebecca Norris Webb, Darren Ching and Debra Klomp Ching, Catherine Edelman, Mary Ellen Mark, Nick Brandt, and Chris Jordan have all served as Jurors for various shows. Some notable Call for Entries have been Black and White, Blue, Red, Art in Nature, Black and White 2013, and the Box Squared Exhibition. Participants are shown in a Main Gallery exhibition and archived in an online gallery. Noteworthy photographers that have been shown at The Center include G. M. B. Akash, Yoichi Nagata, Manjari S Sharma, S. Gayle Stevens, Steen Doessing, Gilles Perrin, Michael Grecco, Daniel Beltra and David Zimmerman.

== Education ==
The Center for Fine Art Photography offers a variety of photographic workshops suited to a range of interests and experience, from the emerging enthusiast to the seasoned professional. Each workshop is presented by an instructor who has extensive experience in the topic area covered.
