= Sara Naomi Lewkowicz =

American photographer

Sara Naomi Lewkowicz is a 42 year old American photographer best known for her 2013 Time magazine article "Photographer as Witness: A Portrait of Domestic Violence". Her work with the article and Lewkowicz's overall work covering domestic violence won her the Ville de Perpignan Rémi Ochlik Award in 2013.

== Education ==
Lewkowicz attended Ohio University, where she completed a master's degree in Visual Communication.

== Photographer as Witness ==
On February 27, 2013, Lewkowicz published "Photographer as Witness", which had originally been published on the photography website fotovisura as “Maggie and Shane”. The article showed photographs of Shane, a 31-year-old ex-convict abusing his 19-year-old girlfriend Maggie, and was accompanied by an essay by Lewkowicz. In the essay Lewkowicz described how her initial purpose for photographing the couple was to "paint a portrait of the catch-22 of being a released ex-convict: even though they are physically free, the metaphorical prison of stigma doesn’t allow them to truly escape." However, during one of her visits Shane and Maggie began fighting over a woman that had flirted with Shane at a bar they had just left. Once they returned home and entered the house's kitchen, the two continued to fight and Shane escalated the dispute and attacked Maggie in view of her daughter Memphis, who had heard the altercation. Lewkowicz photographed the events, pausing at one point to ensure that the police had been called. Shane was arrested for his actions and Maggie has since left Shane.

After the photos were published in Time Lewkowicz began receiving criticism from Internet users, who questioned why she continued to photograph while the physical violence was still ongoing. Lewkowicz responded to the criticism by stating "The incident raised a number of ethical questions. I’ve been castigated by a number of anonymous internet commenters who have said that I should have somehow physically intervened between the two. Their criticism counters what actual law enforcement officers have told me — that physically intervening would have likely only made the situation worse, endangering me, and further endangering Maggie."

The photographs have since won several awards, including the 2014 L'Iris d'Or Award.
