= David Blackburn (artist) =

British artist (1939–2016)

- Born: 22 June 1939; Huddersfield, England
- Died: 23 March 2016 (aged 76); Huddersfield, England
- Education: Royal College of Art (1959–1962)
- Known for: Drawing, Collage
- Notable work: Landscape Vision (series)

David Blackburn MBE (22 June 1939 – 23 March 2016) was a British artist based in the north of England. He worked almost exclusively in the pastel medium and was noted for his highly evocative depictions of the landscape.

== Early life and education ==
Blackburn was born in Huddersfield in 1939 to Wilfred, a painter and decorator, and Nora. As an only child, Blackburn spent his time painting and walking on the moors near his home; it is this period which he credits as helping him to the cultivate the ‘strong inner vision’ which is a major hallmark of his art. After securing a scholarship to the local grammar school, Blackburn studied at the Huddersfield School of Art for several years. His friends included the playwright David Halliwell, whose play Little Malcolm and His Struggle Against the Eunuchs was loosely based on the students who attended the college, and the children's television personality Wilf Lunn.

On the advice of his tutor, Blackburn successfully applied for a place at the Royal College of Art, where he studied from 1959–1962. Although he was initially based in the Textile Department, students were encouraged to move between areas, and Blackburn quickly found himself drawn to the more subtle challenges of landscape art, a slightly unfashionable subject at the time. Many of Blackburn's contemporaries, including David Hockney and R.B. Kitaj, were gaining major critical recognition for their innovations in what would soon become known as Pop Art, or 'Royal College Pop'. Blackburn was unmoved by the playful aesthetic of such trends, preferring instead the quieter visions of landscape artists such as Gerhart Frankl and Prunella Clough, the former of whom went on to become a major influence and personal friend.

Unknown Title (Belgrave), circa 1970s, 40x33.75 cm, pastel on paper.

== Career ==
After leaving college, Blackburn travelled to Germany, France and Italy for a year before accepting a position at the Royal Melbourne Institute of Technology. During his time in Australia, he was deeply affected by the work of Fred Williams, who helped him to develop an understanding of space away from the 'European concept of foreground, middle distance and background', which he increasingly came to regard as 'irrelevant'. After a few years living between Britain and Australia and lecturing at institutions such as the University of Manchester and Melbourne University, Blackburn accepted a Visiting Fellowship at Merton College, Oxford, an experience which he describes as 'a delightful interlude between trips'; acquaintances included Rex Richards and W.H. Auden.

In 1981, Blackburn took up a position as a visiting professor at Georgetown University in Washington D.C. At this time he became influenced by the vertical perspectives of the American cityscape, and began to experiment with electronic imagery and collage techniques. However, after this short period of experimentation Blackburn realised that his 'inner life was based in the natural world, not the city', and subsequently embarked on a complex and long-running sequence of transcendent pastel drawings known as the Landscape Vision series. In the early 90s, Blackburn returned to Huddersfield to care for his mother, who died in 1993. He remained in the north of England, where he continued to observe the landscape and work on his project of visionary panels, until his death in 2016.

Blackburn was appointed Member of the Order of the British Empire (MBE) in the 2015 New Year Honours for services to art.

== Work ==
One of the earliest people to recognise Blackburn's talent as an artist of major significance was the eminent cultural theorist Sir Kenneth Clark, who described him as 'a very distinguished artist – a great artist who has not yet received sufficient recognition'. Other early supporters included Humphrey Brooke, secretary of the Royal Academy, and the war photographer Humphrey Spender. In subsequent years, Blackburn has been the subject of three documentaries, Celebrations (ITV), Northern Lights (BBC) and Landscapes of the Mind (Optic Nerve), and was awarded an Hon. D.Litt. by the University of Huddersfield in 1997. Such a wealth of appreciation has done little to raise Blackburn's popular profile, however, and at present his work is mainly appreciated by academics, collectors and fellow artists.

Blackburn's approach to the landscape is to find what he describes as the 'hidden poetry' or the 'visual magic', in which a recognisable object, such as a cobweb or a leaf, can be 'transform[ed] into something richer and stranger'. Blackburn's works are noted for the way in which they play with notions of scale and perspective; often one can be observing what appears to be a fragment of rock or sand, when the scale suddenly shifts to suggest a vista of topographical magnitude. Coupled with Blackburn's interest in capturing the process of transformation is a desire to 'express an inner vision in terms of an external reality', a pursuit of the sublime which lends his work a 'beauty of ineffable inner radiance', to quote Sister Wendy Beckett.

Windows, 1992, 42x37cm, collage.

Part of Blackburn's major achievement is his mastery of pastel, a substance which is notoriously difficult to control. His interest in this medium was piqued by his intense reaction as a young man to the art of Gerhart Frankl, who used it as a means of conveying the vividness of his native Austrian landscape. Blackburn has praised the effects which result from the unpredictability of his chosen medium, saying that 'I may get something that is totally unexpected and even magical', and describing it as a material which allows 'forms [to] continually emerge then disappear'. Blackburn's mastery of pastel is regarded as unequalled in contemporary art, with the critic Peter Fuller observing that he has developed 'techniques which are not only entirely suited to his aesthetic purposes, but also, as far as I know, unique.'

Blackburn's earliest pieces to garner critical attention were Creation (1963–1966) and Metamorphosis (1966–1968), completed whilst he was still in his twenties. Both of these works consist of a number of small, largely symbolic drawings depicting a cluster of ideas defined by Blackburn as 'Life, Change, Development and Death'. After his introduction to the bush, however, these more broadly philosophical qualities began to be discarded in favour of techniques which engaged with the spatial void of the Australian landscape. New vivid blocks of colour which took up large portions of the canvas began to appear, along with less literal representations of the environment; often in these works, trees and rocks are suggested, only for the image to transform into a micro close-up of the ground or a sweeping aerial vista overhead, a trend which would go on to be a defining feature of his artistic vision.

After his move to America in the early 80s, Blackburn's art responded to the largely urban environment in which he found himself. His work began to assimilate more diagrammatic structures, suggestive of blueprints or architectural plans, and his central images were often framed in a device resembling a glass window. Blackburn described his interest at this time in capturing what he defined as the 'visual geometry' of the cityscape, using the vertical impulse of the skyscraper to explore new methods of representing space in contrast to the blank expanse of the Australian bush. In the mid-80s this new style was expanded to include curious fragments of collage material, lending his work something of a 'sci-fi quality', to quote the art historian Charlotte Mullins.

A Landscape Vision No. 2, 1986, 150x162.5 cm, pastel on paper.

However, these innovations proved to be somewhat temporary, and in the late 80s Blackburn began to synthesise his skills into the overarching project of the Landscape Vision series. These works consist of a number of small panels which are carefully arranged to create a larger whole. The connection between individual pictures is often quite oblique, encouraging the viewer to trace a through-line which is meandering and non-linear, complementing the metamorphic aesthetic contained within each individual drawing. Many of the most recent images are quite sombre in tone and evoke the bleakness of the moorland near Huddersfield. However, Blackburn is sceptical of being regarded as northern artist, arguing that such a view pressures the work to be regarded as 'isolated', 'unworldly' and 'grim' at the expense of its other qualities. In the Landscape Vision series, as in all his art, Blackburn continues to cultivate a response to the landscape in which its pictorial elements are re-shaped into magical or transformative structures. The sense of immanence in his work is a way of providing expression for a personal vision in which 'the relationship between the unnoticed and the infinite' is regarded as a central means through which the artist can respond the world which he inhabits.

== Bibliography ==
- Simon Armitage, 'Somewhere To Believe In', Modern Painters 17 (2004), pp. 105–107.
- Peter Fuller, 'David Blackburn: Light and Landscape', catalogue essay, Yale Centre for British Art (1989), pp. 7–13.
- Sasha Grishin, David Blackburn and the Visionary Landscape Tradition (London: Hart Gallery, 1994).
- Charlotte Mullins, David Blackburn: The Sublime Landscape (London: Hart Gallery, 2002).
- John Sheeran, 'David Blackburn', catalogue essay, Dulwich Picture Gallery (1986), pp. 7–13.
- Malcolm Yorke, David Blackburn: A Landscape Vision (London: Hart Gallery, 1999).
