= Silvana Paternostro =

- Born: 1962 (age 63–64); Barranquilla, Colombia
- Occupations: Journalist, author
- Writing career
- Genres: Narrative journalism, oral history, nonfiction
- Notable works: In the Land of God and Man (1998); My Colombian War (2007); Solitude & Company (2014/2019)
- Notable awards: Dorothea Lange–Paul Taylor Prize (1997); PEN/Martha Albrand Award nomination (1998); Time/CNN 50 Latin American Leaders (1999)

Silvana Paternostro (born c. 1962 in Barranquilla, Colombia) is a Colombian-American journalist and author who has written extensively on Cuba and Central and South America. She specializes in women's issues, and has also written comprehensively about AIDS, revolutionary movements, underground economies, and the intersection of literature, music and other cultural forms with politics and economics. In 1999 she was selected by Time/CNN as one of 50 Latin American Leaders for the New Millennium.

== Early life and education ==
Paternostro was born circa 1962 in Barranquilla, Colombia. She left Colombia for the United States in 1977 at the age of fifteen.

== Career ==
=== Journalism ===
Paternostro is a Contributing Editor of BOMB magazine and a frequent contributor to The New York Times Magazine, Newsweek, The Paris Review, The New Republic, and numerous other publications. Her work is frequently translated and reprinted, especially in Latin America.

Her exposé of re-virginization centers in the United States appeared in the book Se Habla Español: Voces Latinas en USA, the first anthology of new Latino voices in the United States published in Spanish.

=== Books ===
==== In the Land of God and Man (1998) ====
Paternostro's first book, In the Land of God and Man: Confronting Our Sexual Culture, was published by Dutton Adult in 1998. The book explores gender roles and the effect of government and religion on women's lives in Latin America, tracing connections between structural machismo, the Catholic Church, and the spread of HIV/AIDS among women in the region. It was nominated for the PEN/Martha Albrand Award for First Nonfiction. A 20th-anniversary edition was published in Colombia in 2023.

==== My Colombian War (2007) ====
Her second book, My Colombian War: A Journey Through the Country I Left Behind, mixes memoir with history and reportage to tell the story of Colombia's 40-year-old civil war and uncover the truth about United States involvement in the country. It was published by Henry Holt in September 2007.

==== Solitude & Company (2014) ====
In 2014, Paternostro published Soledad & Compañía, an oral history biography of Gabriel García Márquez constructed from interviews with the author's friends, family, and literary associates. The English translation, Solitude & Company, was published in March 2019 in translation by Edith Grossman. Foreign rights have been acquired in Brazil, India, Russia, Serbia, Poland, and China.

=== Film ===
Paternostro was associate producer on Che: The Argentine and Che: Guerrilla, a two-part biographical film about Che Guevara directed by Steven Soderbergh and starring Benicio del Toro. The film started shooting in July 2007 and premiered at the Cannes Film Festival in 2008.

== Awards and recognition ==
- 1997 – Dorothea Lange–Paul Taylor Prize, Center for Documentary Studies at Duke University, with photographer Ernesto Bazan, for El Periodo Especial, a documentary project on daily life in Cuba during the Special Period.
- 1998 – PEN/Martha Albrand Award for First Nonfiction, nomination, for In the Land of God and Man
- 1999 – Time/CNN 50 Latin American Leaders for the New Millennium
- Senior Fellow, World Policy Institute
