= Visa pour l'Image =

- Genre: Festival photography
- Locations: Perpignan, France
- Founded: 1989
- Website: www.visapourlimage.com

Visa pour l'Image is an international photojournalism festival established in 1989, which takes place annually in the entire city of Perpignan, France. This is the main and most important festival of photojournalism in France and runs from late August to mid-September for a period of 15 days.

Visa pour l'Image not only offers exhibitions spread across the city, but also conferences and meetings. Photographers such as Herb Ritts and Claude Gassian have participated in the festival.

In April 2019, Renaud Dondieu de Vabres succeeded Jean-Paul Grimolet as president of the Visa association for the image that oversees the festival. In 2022, the festival will run from August 27 to September 11. The professional week takes place from August 29 to September 42. The period reserved for schools is from September 12 to 23.

== France: awards ==
=== 2012 ===
The awards for 2012 were as follows.

- Visa Off: Clara Gabrielli / "Libros a Euro"
- Visa d'or News : Éric Bouvet pour Le Figaro Magazine – Bab al-Azizia, la fin.
- Visa d'or Magazine : Stephanie Sinclair / VII pour National Geographic Magazine – Ces petites filles que l'on marie.
- Visa d'or Presse Quotidienne : Tomas Munita pour The New York Times magazine (USA)
- Visa d'or Humanitaire du Comité international de la Croix-Rouge (CICR) : Mani pour Le Monde – Syrie, dans Homs
- Prix de la Ville de Perpignan Rémi Ochlik : Sebastián Liste / Reportage by Getty Images – Urban Quilombo
- Prix Canon de Femme Photojournaliste 2012 : Sarah Caron – Les femmes paschtounes au Pakistan
- Prix France 24 / RFI du Webdocumentaire : " Défense d'Afficher " par Sidonie Garnier, François Le Gall et Jeanne Thibord
- Prix ANI-Pixpalace 2012 : Misha Friedman – Tuberculose en Ouzbékistan, en Ukraine et en Russie.
- Getty Images Grants for Editorial Photography : Bharat Choudhary (Le silence des autres), Sebastián Liste / Reportage by Getty Images (Le Far West brésilien), Kosuke Okahara (Fragments / Fukushima), Paolo Marchetti (Fever – Le réveil d'un fascisme européen).
- Prix Pierre et Alexandra Boulat : Maciek Nabrdalik / VII – Les migrations économiques en Europe.

=== 2013 ===
The awards for 2013 were as follows.

- Visa d'or de la Presse Quotidienne : Niklas Meltio / Helsingin Sanomat : Syrie
- Visa d'or Magazine : Noriko Hayashi / Panos Pictures – Réa : Le mariage au Kirghizistan : une institution pas très sainte
- Visa d'or News : Laurent Van der Stockt / Reportage by Getty Images pour Le Monde : Syrie
- Visa d'or humanitaire du Comité International de la Croix-Rouge (CICR) Sebastiano Tomada / Sipa Press : Alep (Syrie), situation des blessés, difficultés d'accès aux soins et précarité des structures de secours.
- Visa d'or FRANCE 24-RFI du webdocumentaire 2013 : Isabelle Fougère et Miquel Dewever-Plana : Alma, une enfant de la Violence.
- Visa d'or d'honneur du Figaro Magazine Don McCullin / Contact Press Images
- Prix de la Ville de Perpignan Rémi Ochlik 2013 Sara Lewkowicz / Reportage by Getty Images : Shane et Maggie : portrait d'une violence domestique
- Prix Canon de la Femme Photojournaliste Décerné par l'Association des Femmes Journalistes (AFJ) : Mary F. Calvert / Zuma Press : projet sur les violences sexuelles au sein de l'armée américaine.
- Prix ANI – PixPalace : Paolo Marchetti : Cité Soleil, Haïti.
- Getty Images Grants for Editorial Photography : Matt Eich : Péché et Salut dans le quartier de Baptist Town Marco Gualazzini / LUZphoto : M23 – Le Kivu, RDC, région en état de siège Samuel James / Cosmos : Le Pétrole au Nigeria Eugene Richards : War is Personal Tomas Van Houtryve / VII : Corée du Nord
- Prix Pierre et Alexandra Boulat : Arnau Bach : projet sur les banlieues marseillaises.

=== 2014 ===
The awards for 2014 were as follows.

- Visa d'or de la Presse Quotidienne : Meeri Koutaniemi : mutilations génitales féminines au Kenya
- Visa d'or Magazine : Guillaume Herbaut / Institute - Ukraine, de Maïdan au Donbass
- Visa d'or News : Tyler Hicks / The New York Times - Massacre au centre commercial Westgate de Nairobi (Kenya)
- Visa d'or humanitaire du Comité International de la Croix-Rouge (CICR) : William Daniels : République Centrafricaine
- Visa d'or FRANCE 24-RFI du webdocumentaire 2014 : Olivia Colo et Samuel Bollendorf : Le Grand incendie
- Visa d'or d'honneur du Figaro Magazine Don McCullin / Contact Press Images
- Prix de la Ville de Perpignan Rémi Ochlik 2013 Sara Lewkowicz / Reportage by Getty Images : Maxim Dondyuk
- Prix Canon de la Femme Photojournaliste Décerné par l'Association des Femmes Journalistes (AFJ) : Viviane Dalles
- Prix ANI – PixPalace : Frédérick Buyck : Jesus, make-up and football
- Getty Images Grants for Editorial Photography : Giulio Di Sturco (Ganges : mort d’un fleuve), Krisanne Johnson (Afrique du Sud : la jeunesse post-apartheid), William Daniels (République centrafricaine), Jordi Busqué (Les Mennonites de Manitoba) et Juan Arredondo (Né en plein conflit).
- Prix Pierre et Alexandra Boulat : Kosuke Okahara : projet de reportage sur la drogue en Colombie

== See also ==
- Rencontres d'Arles
