= Center for Documentary Studies =

Nonprofit support corporation of Duke University

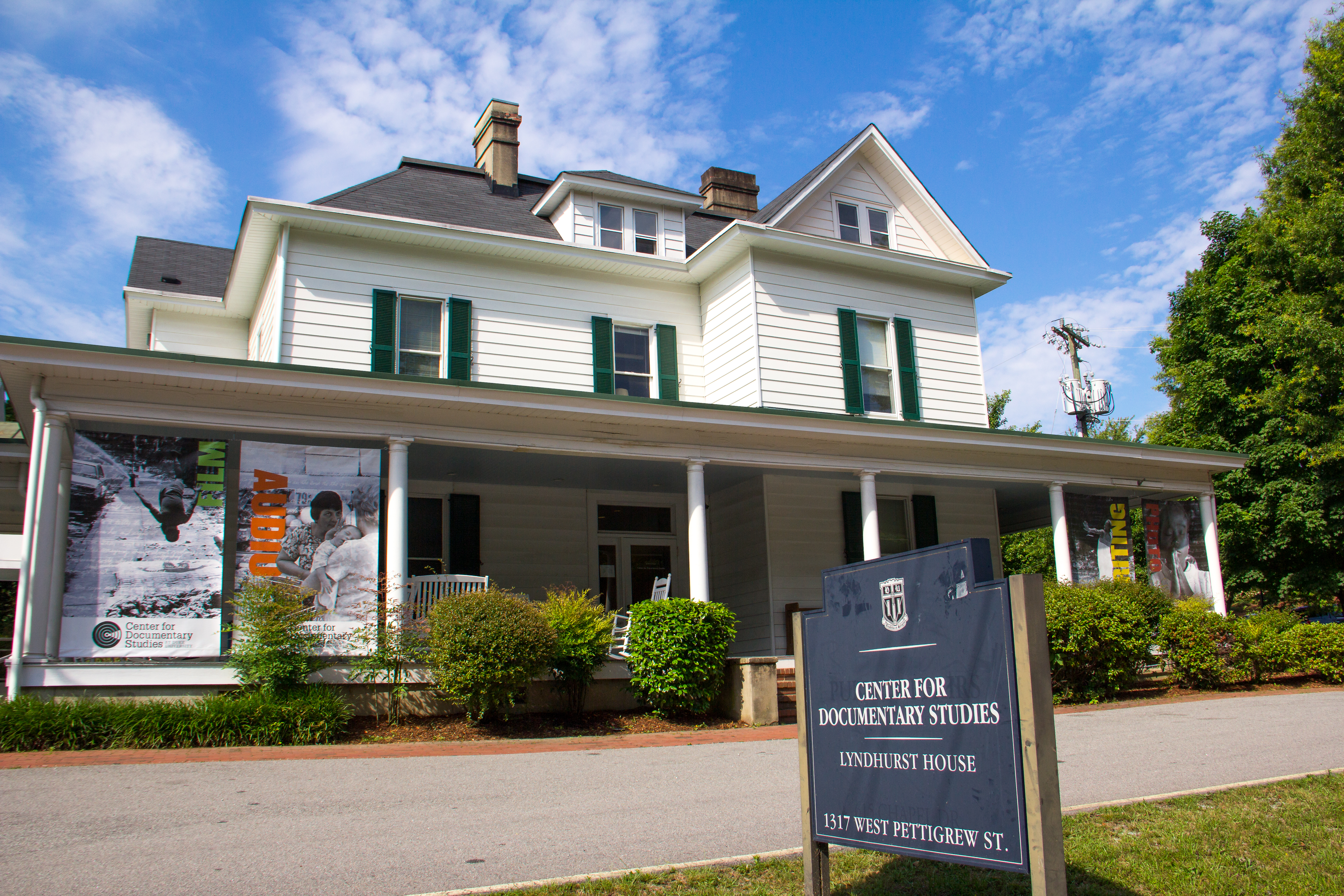
Center for Documentary Studies

The Center for Documentary Studies (CDS) is a 501(c)(3) nonprofit support corporation of Duke University dedicated to the documentary arts. Having been created in 1989 through an endowment from the Lyndhurst Foundation, the organization’s founders were Robert Coles, William Chafe, Alex Harris, and Iris Tillman Hill. In 1994, CDS moved into a renovated nineteenth-century home, named it the Lyndhurst House. That structure and a large addition house the main activities of CDS on the edge of Duke University’s campus in Durham, North Carolina. The Full Frame Documentary Film Festival, a CDS program, has its offices on the American Tobacco Campus in the American Tobacco Historic District in downtown Durham.

The Center for Documentary Studies has had four directors since its founding: Iris Tillman Hill (1990–98), Tom Rankin (1998–2013), Wesley Hogan (2013–2021), and Opeyemi Olukemi (2021–present). With support from the Reva and David Logan Foundation, the organization held a 25th-anniversary event in 2015. The three-day forum, Documentary 2015: Origins and Inventions, included panellists and honorees from the documentary mediums that CDS is rooted in—photography, writing, audio, and film/video. Honorees included the Kitchen Sisters, Natasha Trethewey, John Cohen, and Samuel D. Pollard.

Staff and faculty at CDS teach, produce, support, and present the documentary arts. Among the organization’s stated goals is promoting documentary work that fosters respect among individuals, breaks down barriers to understanding, and illuminates social injustices. Other stated organizational priorities include diversifying the documentary arts and exploring documentary innovation.

== Education ==
=== Undergraduate education ===
Undergraduate courses in Documentary Studies are open to Duke University students. Students enrolled at other universities in the North Carolina Triangle area—the University of North Carolina–Chapel Hill, North Carolina Central University, and North Carolina State University—may also take these courses for credit. Students may complete a Certificate in Documentary Studies. As part of its undergraduate education program, CDS coordinates the Lehman Brady Visiting Joint Chair Professorship in Documentary Studies and American Studies at Duke and the University of North Carolina at Chapel Hill, which brings a documentarian to teach on both campuses each year. Past Lehman Brady Professors have included Deborah Willis, Allan Gurganus, and Marco Williams, among others. CDS offers several undergraduate awards and fellowships.

=== Continuing education ===
CDS offers continuing education courses in the documentary arts through onsite and online classes, summer intensives, and weekend workshops. The open-admissions program includes the option of completing a Certificate in Documentary Arts; a two-year distance-learning certificate track is available for non-local students.

=== Graduate education ===
CDS cofounded—with the Department of Art, Art History, and Visual Studies and the Arts of the Moving Image Program—Duke University’s first Master of Fine Arts program, the MFA in Experimental and Documentary Arts (MFA|EDA). The two-year course of study brings together the documentary approach with experimental production in analog, digital, and computational media. Former CDS director Tom Rankin is the current director of the MFA|EDA.

== Awards, books, and exhibitions ==
CDS’s competitive awards for documentarians include the Dorothea Lange–Paul Taylor Prize (Lange-Taylor Prize) for projects that rely on the interplay of words and images, the Documentary Essay Prize for documentary photography or writing, the CDS/Honickman First Book Prize in Photography for North American photographers who have never published a book-length work before, the CDS Filmmaker Award for artists in competition at the Full Frame Documentary Film Festival and, for undergraduates, the John Hope Franklin Student Documentary Awards and the Julia Harper Day Award. Notable recent winners of the Julia Day Harper Award include Rebekah Fergusson and David Delaney Mayer.

CDS presents documentary work through exhibitions in its gallery spaces and through CDS Books, a publishing program that includes photographic monographs as well as a series in Documentary Arts and Culture in association with the University of North Carolina Press. CDS has published books by winners of the CDS/Honickman First Book Prize in Photography in association with Duke University Press.

== Full Frame Documentary Film Festival ==
The Full Frame Documentary Film Festival is an annual four-day event in Durham, North Carolina dedicated to the exhibition of nonfiction cinema. Full Frame also presents documentary films in other venues throughout the year and has educational programs for students and teachers. The festival was launched in 1998 by Nancy Buirski in association with CDS, and then called the DoubleTake Documentary Film Festival. In 2002 it became an independent nonprofit and changed its name to the Full Frame Documentary Film Festival. It again became a CDS program in 2010. Full Frame is a qualifying event for nominations for the Academy Award for Best Documentary (Short Subject) and the Producers Guild of America Awards.

== Scene on Radio podcast ==
Center for Documentary Studies audio director John Biewen launched the organization’s Scene on Radio podcast in 2015 with a stated goal of exploring American society. The podcast is distributed to radio by the Public Radio Exchange.

- Season 1 - Contested covers topics relating to sports.
- Season 2 - Seeing White explores the notion of whiteness, the roots of white supremacy, and how racism operates today. This was nominated for a 2017 Peabody Award.
- Season 3 - MEN covers topics relating to masculinity and patriarchy.
- Season 4 - The Land That Never Has Been Yet is about democracy in the US.
- Season 5 - The Repair examines climate change.

== Other projects and initiatives ==
=== Current ===
One of CDS’s oldest initiatives, Literacy Through Photography (LTP), was developed by Wendy Ewald in partnership with CDS and the Durham Public Schools. Ewald also developed an LTP program in Houston. The LTP teaching methodology challenges students to explore their world using photography and to use the images as a stimulus for verbal and written expression. An LTP undergraduate course at CDS includes working with children in local schools. Through the DukeEngage program, undergraduates can participate in an LTP program created by CDS staff in Arusha, Tanzania, that trains Tanzanian teachers in LTP’s philosophy and methodology and works with Tanzanian students on classroom photography and writing projects. LTP staff also conduct workshops at home and abroad.

Lewis Hine Documentary Fellows Program is named after the social-reform photographer Lewis W. Hine and places young documentarians in fellowships with humanitarian organizations focused on the needs of children and their communities.

CDS’s Documentary Diversity Project is a three-year pilot program aimed at bringing more people of color into the documentary arts field. Emerging artists (18–24) and post-MFA fellows from underrepresented groups have long term, living-wage residencies to work on developing their skills and projects. The pilot, which started in 2017, is made possible in part by the William R. Kenan, Jr. Charitable Trust.

The SNCC Digital Gateway is a documentary website that was created as part of a partnership between CDS, the Student Nonviolent Coordinating Committee (SNCC) Legacy Project, and Duke University Libraries. The site explores SNCC as an organization and how it worked to organize a grassroots movement in the 1960s around voting rights that has relevance today. A stated aim of the site is to make SNCC’s experiences and strategies accessible to activists, educators, students, and engaged citizens. The gateway was made possible by the support of the Andrew W. Mellon Foundation, including a series of critical oral histories with civil rights veterans, historians, and others on the Black Power movement. A second series of oral histories, funded by the National Endowment for the Humanities, will focus on the work that led to the Voting Rights Act of 1965.

Through a 2017–18 publishing partnership with the Oxford American magazine, CDS contributes stories to the magazine’s online series, The By and By. CDS’s contributions feature work by its faculty, students, and affiliated artists.

=== Past ===
Several of CDS’s previous projects and initiatives include the Behind the Veil oral history project that documented African American life in the Jim Crow South; the Jazz Loft Project based on photographs and tapes made by W. Eugene Smith, which resulted in a book, a radio series with WNYC, and a national touring exhibition; and Indivisible: Stories of American Community, a national photography and audio initiative that included the work of photographers Dawoud Bey, Bill Burke, Debbie Fleming Caffery, Lucy Capehart, Lynn Davis, Terry Evans, Lauren Greenfield, Joan Liftin, Reagan Louie, Danny Lyon, Sylvia Plachy, and Eli Reed and resulted in a book and national touring exhibition.

The Behind the Veil project was funded by the National Endowment for the Humanities, the Lyndhurst Foundation, the Rockefeller Foundation, the Devonwood Foundation, and the graduate schools at Duke University and the University of North Carolina–Chapel Hill. Both the Jazz Loft Project and Indivisible were in partnership with the University of Arizona’s Center for Creative Photography. The Jazz Loft Project was funded by the Reva and David Logan Foundation, the National Endowment for the Humanities, the National Historical Publications and Records Commission, and the National Academy of Recording Arts and Sciences. Indivisible was funded by the Pew Charitable Trusts.

CDS published DoubleTake magazine from 1995–1999 with major support from the Lyndhurst Foundation. Robert Coles and Alex Harris were the founding editors of the quarterly publication, which featured photography and writing. The magazine won a National Magazine Award for General Excellence in 1998. In 1999, the magazine became an independent nonprofit and moved to Somerville, Massachusetts. DoubleTake announced its closing in 2004.
