= World Photography Organisation =

Global platform for photography initiatives

World Photography Organisation (WPO)
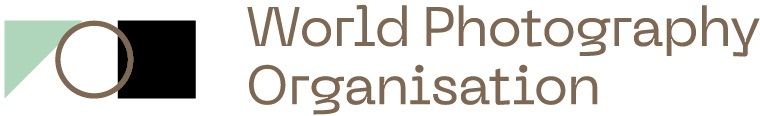
- The WPO logo
- Company type: Privately Held
- Industry: Photography
- Founded: 2007
- Founder: Scott Gray
- Headquarters: 9 Manchester Square, London, W1U 3PL, United Kingdom
- Key people: Scott Gray CEO
- Website: www.worldphoto.org

The World Photography Organisation is a British company best known for its annual Sony World Photography Awards. The company was founded in 2007 by Scott Gray, and is now a subsidiary of Gray's art events company Creo.

The World Photography Organisation hosts a year-round portfolio of events including the Sony World Photography Awards, and Photofairs—art fairs dedicated to presenting fine art photography and moving image.

The company also creates, produces and delivers photographic events for a variety of partners, from exhibitions of individual artists, to platforms on the subject of photography involving artists, and curators from over 20 countries.

== Sony World Photography Awards ==
Sony World Photography Awards Logo

Created by the World Photography Organisation, the Sony World Photography Awards are held annually. The awards are for photography from the past year and across a variety of photographic genres.

More than 1.5 million images from 200+ countries and territories have been entered to the awards since their inception.

=== Competitions, jury and academy ===
The Sony World Photography Awards features four competitions:

- Series (Previously Professional) – bodies of work across 10 categories
- Single Image (Previously Open) – the best single images across 10 categories
- Youth – work from young photographers aged 12 to 19
- Student – work from photography students

The awards are judged annually by museum and gallery directors, curators, publishers, writers and artists. They are also supported by the World Photographic Academy.

=== Outstanding Contribution to Photography ===
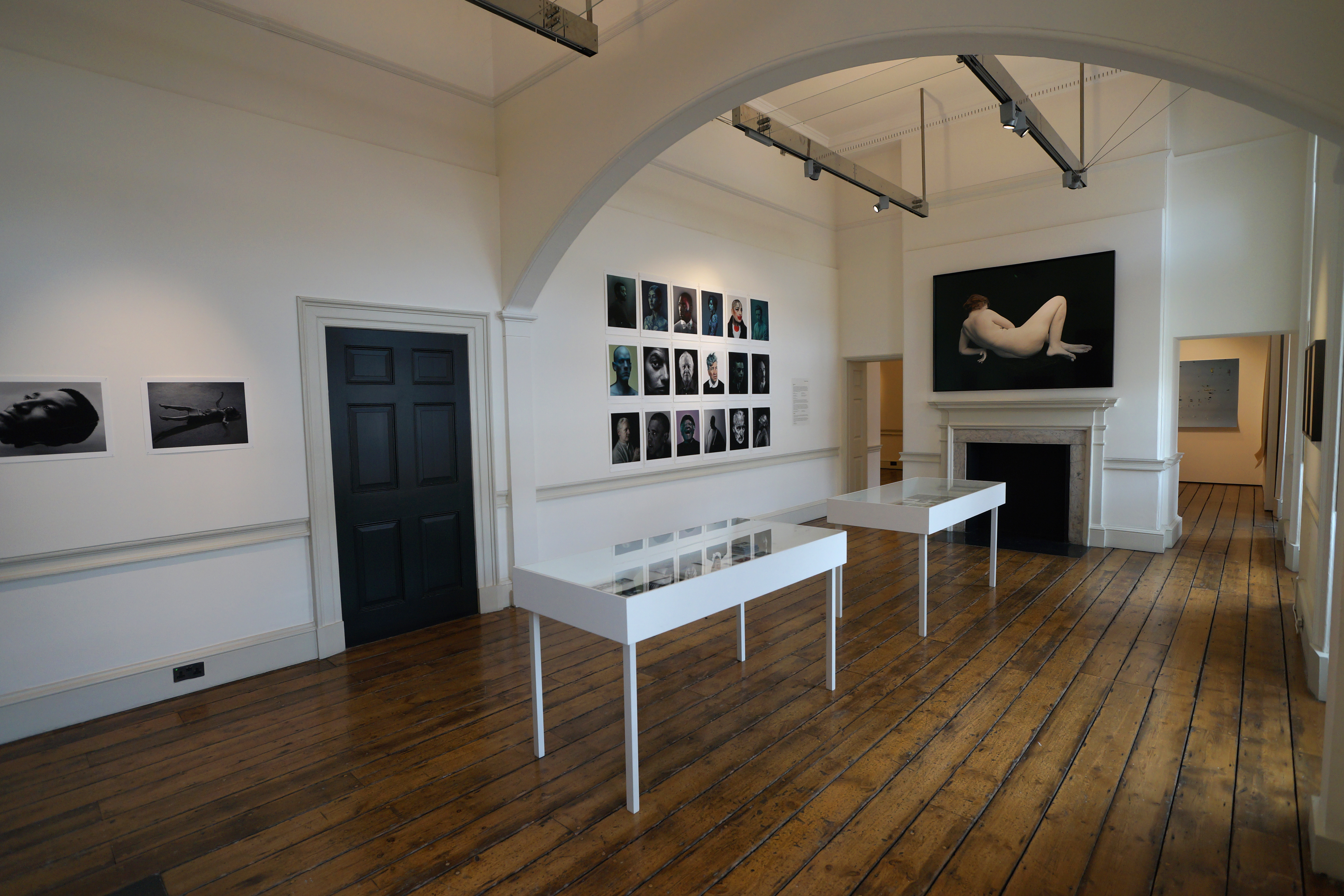
Nadav Kander's work at the 2019 Sony World Photography Awards

Each year the Sony World Photography Awards honor one selected person / chosen people with its Outstanding Contribution to Photography prize. Past recipients of this prize include:

- 2008: Phil Stern
- 2009: Marc Riboud
- 2010: Eve Arnold
- 2011: Bruce Davidson
- 2012: William Klein
- 2013: William Eggleston
- 2014: Mary Ellen Mark
- 2015: Elliott Erwitt
- 2016: Rong Rong & inri
- 2017: Martin Parr
- 2018: Candida Höfer
- 2019: Nadav Kander
- 2020: Gerhard Steidl
- 2021: Graciela Iturbide
- 2022: Edward Burtynsky
- 2023: Rinko Kawauchi
- 2024: Sebastião Salgado
- 2025: Susan Meiselas
- 2026: Joel Meyerowitz

=== Photographer of the Year ===
This is awarded to the overall winner.

- 2008: Vanessa Winship
- 2009: David Zimmerman
- 2010 Tomasso Ausili
- 2011: Alejandro Chaskielberg
- 2012: Mitch Dobrowner
- 2013: Andrea Gjestvang
- 2014: Sara Naomi Lewkowicz
- 2015: John Moore
- 2016: Asghar Khamseh
- 2017: Frederik Buyckx
- 2018: Alys Tomlinson
- 2019: Federico Borella
- 2020: Pablo Albarenga
- 2021: Craig Easton
- 2022: Adam Ferguson
- 2023: Edgar Martins
- 2024: Juliette Pavy
- 2025: Zed Nelson
- 2026: Citlali Fabián

=== Award ceremony, prizes and exhibition ===
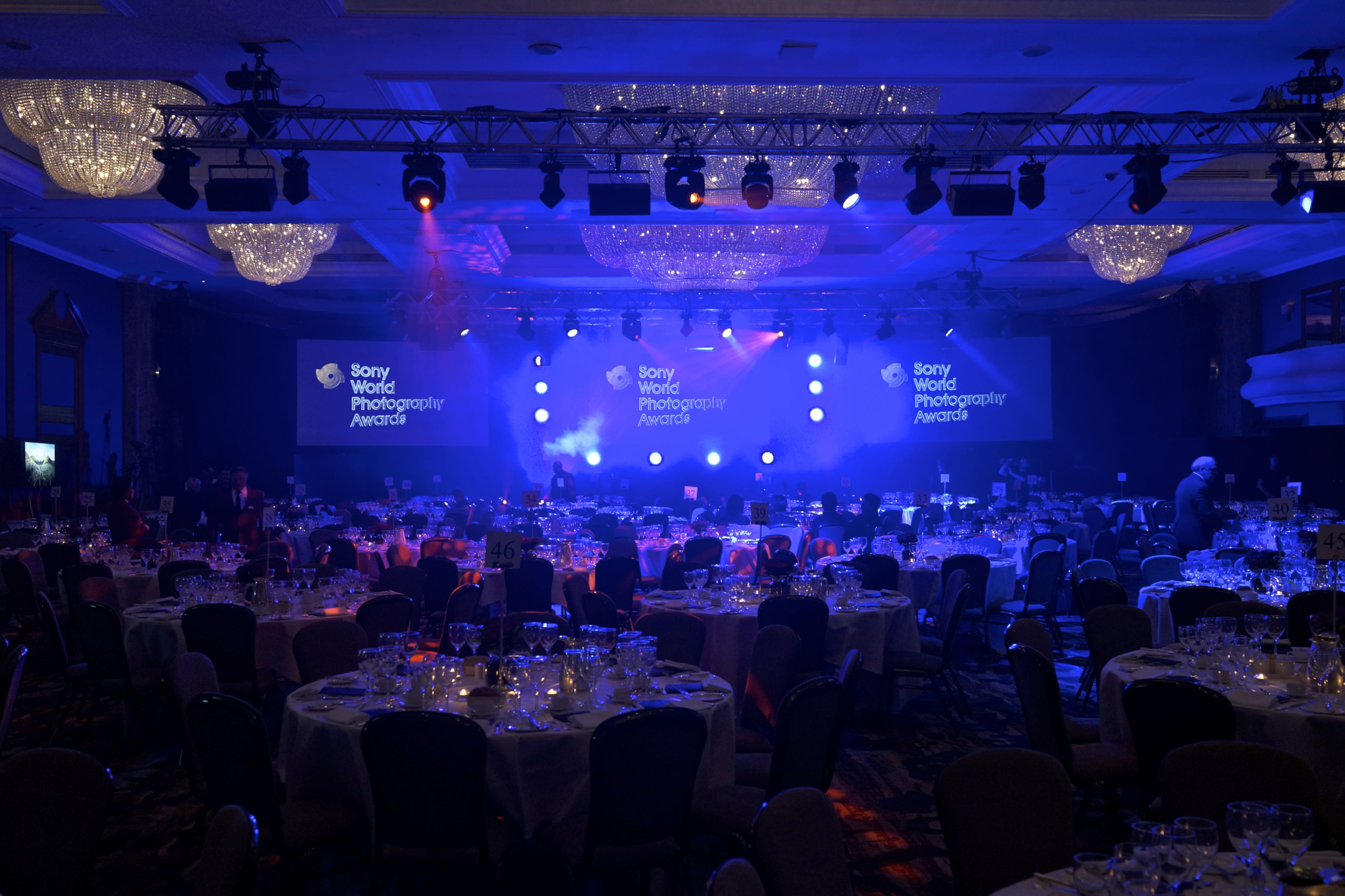
2019 Sony World Photography Awards ceremony at Hilton Park Lane, London.

The first Sony World Photography Awards ceremony was held in Cannes, subsequent ceremonies are annually held in London each April, and followed by an exhibition of the year's winning and shortlisted works at Somerset House in London. The artworks are then shown around the world as part of the Sony World Photography Awards Exhibition tour.

Winning photographers also share cash prizes, Sony digital imaging equipment, publication in the annual Sony World Photography Awards book. Overall and Series competition category winners are also flown to the London Awards ceremony.

== Photofairs ==
Photofairs logo

The World Photography Organisation created the Photofairs brand in 2014. Its aim is to hold boutique events of traditional still photography through to large-scale installations, video works and the cutting edge of technology.

=== Overview ===
Photofairs present fine art photography and moving image from galleries and their artists for collectors. There are also VIP and public programs.

Photofairs takes place annually Shanghai each September and has previously held two editions in San Francisco.

== Zeiss Photography Award ==
Launched in 2015, the Zeiss Photography Award was a collaboration between the World Photography Organisation and Zeiss.

The international photography contest annually invited photographers to submit bodies of work addressing a selected theme. All entries were free and the jury was specifically looking for artworks with a strong narrative. Winners received €12,000 worth of Zeiss lenses, €3,000 to cover travel costs for a photography project, an exhibition in London and the opportunity to work with Zeiss and the World Photography Organisation.

=== Past winners ===
- 2016: Tamina-Florentine Zuch, Germany
- 2017: Kevin Faingnaert, Belgium
- 2018: Nick Hannes, Belgium
- 2019 Rory Doyle, USA
- 2020: KyeongJun Yang, South Korea
