= Hannah Arendt Prize in Critical Theory and Creative Research =

The Hannah Arendt Prize in Critical Theory and Creative Research is a prize competition awarded annually to original essays written on topics at the intersection of art and creative research. Essay submissions engage a new theme chosen each year in the tradition of political theorist Hannah Arendt. The award was established in 2012 by the Master of Arts in Critical Theory and Creative Research at the Oregon Institute for Creative Research in Portland, Oregon. The competition is open to the public, and winners are selected by an international jury.

== Past themes ==
- 2012: 'The Visible, the Invisible, and the Indivisible'
- 2013: 'On Art and Disobedience; Or, What Is an Intervention?'

== Past juries ==
- 2012: Keith Gessen, Lewis Hyde, Atta Kim, Geoffrey Mann, W.J.T. Mitchell, Sina Najafi, and Jacques Rancière
- 2013: Claire Bishop, Judith Butler, Barbara Duden, Julia Kristeva, Heike Kühn, and Martha Rosler

== Past winners ==
- 2012: Rob Marks, "The Site of Imaginative Contention".
- 2013: First place: Stéphanie Bertrand for “Dropouts” and Nate Harrison for “Immanence of Intervention, Revival of Critique”. Second place: Marc Lombardo for “On Power, Truth, and Living Statues”. Third place: Arnaud Gerspacher for “Interventions”.
