= International Center of Photography =

Photography museum in Manhattan, New York

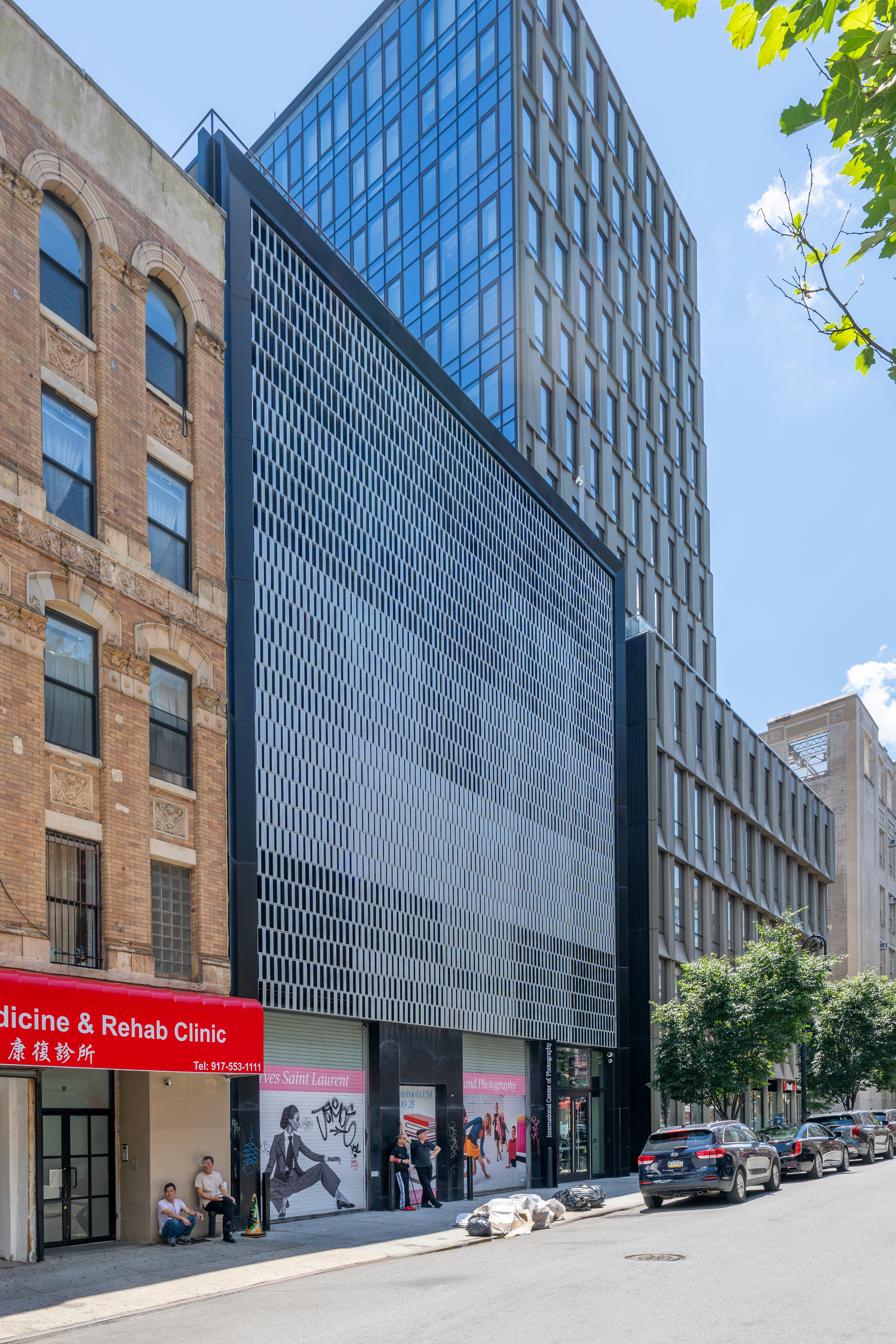
- International Center of Photography at 84 Ludlow Street (2026)
- Established: 1974
- Location: 84 Ludlow Street, Manhattan, New York
- Coordinates: 40°43′04.9″N 73°59′19.0″W
- Type: Art museum
- Director: Bob Jeffrey
- Public transit access: Bus: M21, M103; Subway: at Delancey/Essex
- Website: www.icp.org

The International Center of Photography (ICP) is a photography museum and school on the Lower East Side of Manhattan in New York City. ICP's photographic collection, reading room, and archives are at Mana Contemporary in Jersey City, New Jersey. The organization was founded by Cornell Capa in 1974.

ICP is the host of the Infinity Awards, inaugurated in 1985 "to bring public attention to outstanding achievements in photography by honoring individuals with distinguished careers in the field and by identifying future luminaries."

== History ==
Since its founding in 1974 by Cornell Capa with help from Micha Bar-Am in Willard Straight House, on Fifth Avenue's Museum Mile, ICP has presented over 500 exhibitions, bringing the work of more than 3,000 photographers and other artists to the public in one-person and group exhibitions and provided various classes and workshops for students.

=== Founding & Fist Home ===
ICP was founded to keep the legacy of "Concerned Photography" alive. After the untimely deaths of his brother Robert Capa and his colleagues Werner Bischof, Chim (David Seymour), and Dan Weiner in the 1950s, Capa saw the need to keep their humanitarian documentary work in the public eye. In 1966 he founded the International Fund for Concerned Photography.

By 1974 the Audubon Society had outgrown its Delano & Aldrich-designed neo-Georgian mansion at 94th Street, in the Carnegie Hill section of the Upper East Side and sold to another nonprofit organization. The International Center of Photography was created and moved into the Willard D. Straight House at 1130 Fifth Avenue.

In 1985, a satellite facility, ICP Midtown, was created. Plans were also made for redesigning and reconstructing the Midtown location.

=== Movement and Redesign ===
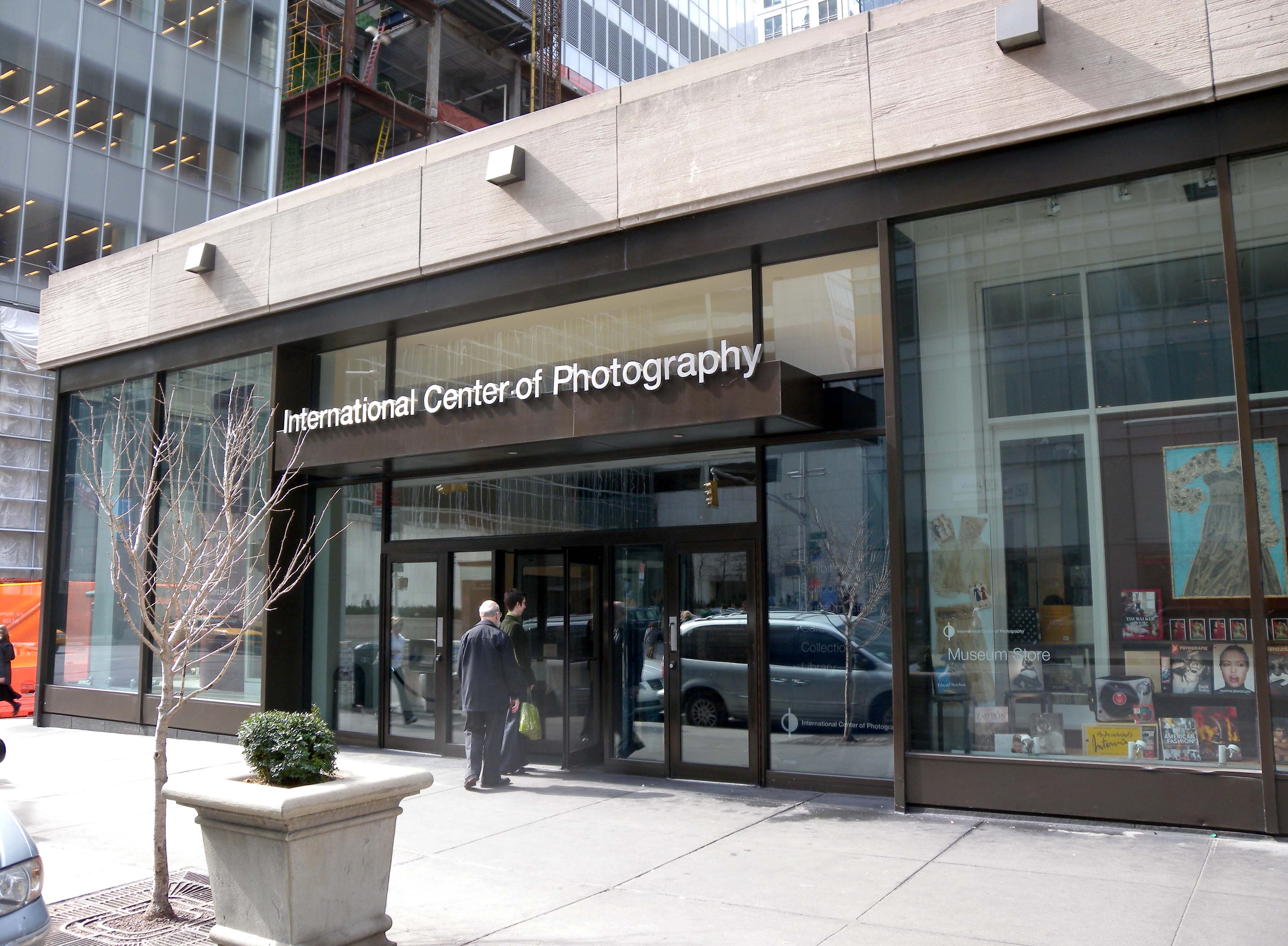
ICP location on 6th Avenue and 43rd Street

In 2000, ICP sold the Fifth Avenue headquarters for $17.5 million to hedge fund founder Bruce Kovner who returned it to use as a private residence after 48 years as a nonprofit headquarters.

The expanded galleries at 1133 Sixth Avenue at 43rd Street were designed by Gwathmey Siegel & Associates Architects for the display of photography and new media. The reopening in the fall of 2000 of the 17,000-square-foot (1,600 m^{2}) site, previously used as a photo gallery for Kodak, provided in one location the same amount of gallery space as the two previous sites combined and became the headquarters of ICP's public exhibitions programs, and also housed an expanded store and a café.

The expansion of the school of the International Center of Photography in the fall of 2001 created a Midtown campus diagonally across from the museum in the Grace Building at 1114 Sixth Avenue. Designed by the architecture firm Gensler, the 27,000-square-foot (2,500 m^{2}) school facility doubled ICP's teaching space and allowed ICP to expand both its programming and community outreach.

=== Move to the Lower East Side ===
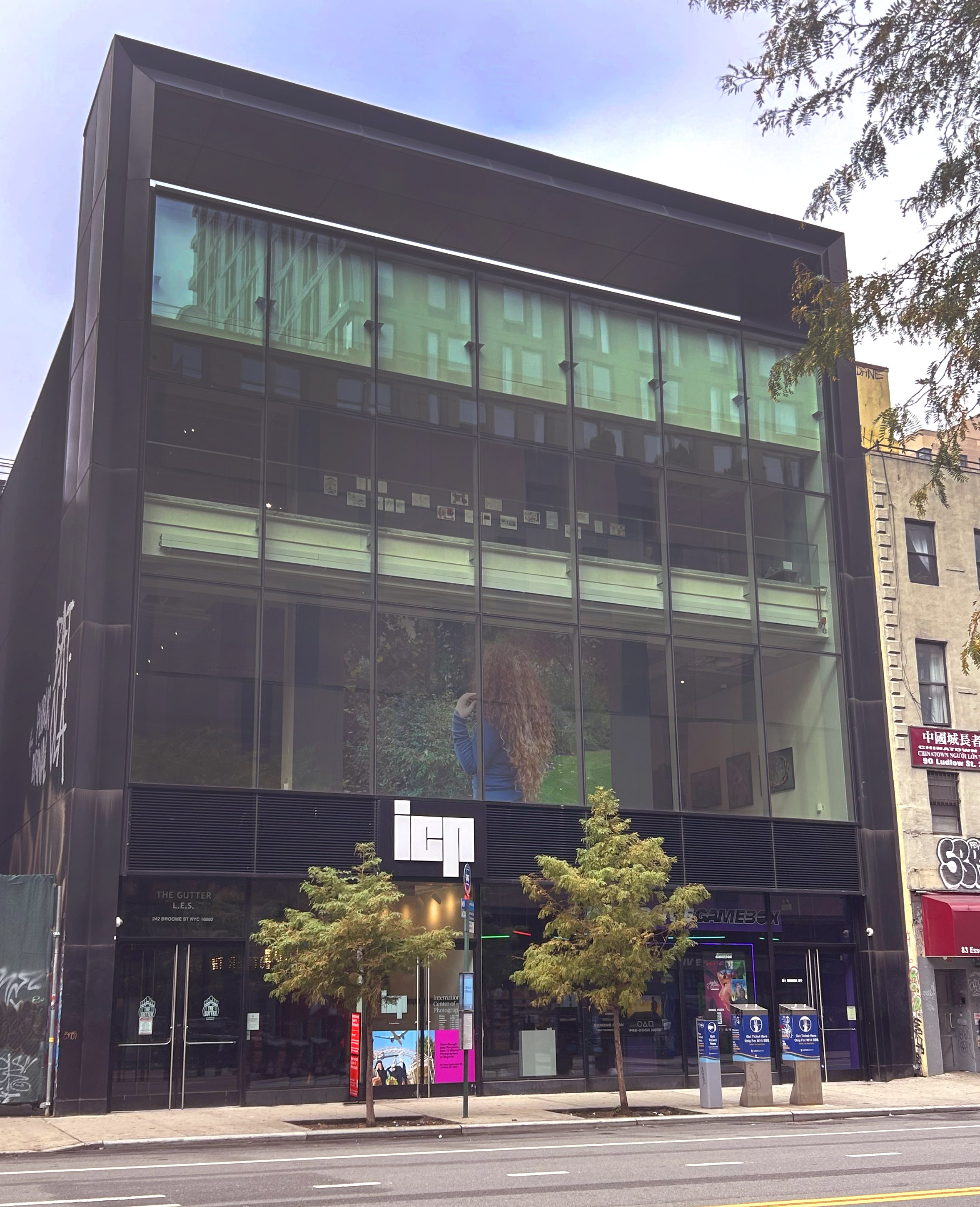
ICP at 79 Essex Street

In 2014, ICP's board approved a plan to buy a building on the Bowery near the New Museum and relocate there. The center's school remained in Midtown, but was expected to eventually move downtown when the lease ended. The midtown museum closed on 11 January 2015, when its lease ended. The ICP museum at 250 Bowery opened on 23 June 2016. In 2017, ICP signed a deal with Delancey Street Associates to house its museum and school at Essex Crossing on the Lower East Side. In 2019, ICP sold its space at 250 Bowery and purchased its new home at 79 Essex Street at Essex Crossing.

In January 2020, ICP opened its new integrated center at 79 Essex Street with the main entrance at 84 Ludlow Street. Designed by architecture firm Gensler, the 40,000 sq ft (3,700 m^{2}) building has two entrances, galleries, media labs, classrooms, darkrooms, shooting studios, a shop, café, research library and public event spaces. The new space is the cultural anchor of the $1.9 billion six-acre Essex Crossing development.

== ICP's School ==
ICP's school serves more than 3,500 students each year, offering courses in a curriculum that ranges from darkroom classes to certificate and master's degree programs. Other educational programming includes a lecture series, seminars, symposia, and workshops hosted by professional photographers.

Opened in 2001, the School was previously at a 27,000-square-foot (2,500 m^{2}) facility at 1114 Sixth Avenue. Designed by Gensler, it was across the street from the former ICP Museum. ICP's school and museum are now located in a unified center on Manhattan's Lower East Side at 84 Ludlow Street.

The school offers a year-round selection of continuing education classes; two one-year Certificate programs on-site (Creative Practices in Photography, Documentary Practice and Visual Journalism); and three one-year Certificate programs online (Documentary Practice: Visual Storytelling Online, Writing and the Photographic Image, and Curatorial Practices in Photography).

=== Public programs ===
Public programs at ICP address issues in photography and its relationship to art, culture, and society and promote the interpretation of ICP's exhibitions and collections. The Naomi Rosenblum ICP Talks lecture series invites photographers to present their work while sharing ideas and concerns about the medium. Other seminars, symposia, and panel discussions feature artists, critics, scholars, and historians.

=== Community programs ===
Community programs relate to the exhibitions. Programs include interactive tours, family day events, workshops, long-term photography programs in four New York City public schools, summer photography programs in community centers, and a high school internship program designed to promote youth leadership.

== Infinity Awards ==
The ICP hosts the Infinity Awards, which were inaugurated in 1985 "to bring public attention to outstanding achievements in photography by honoring individuals with distinguished careers in the field and by identifying future luminaries".

=== Winners ===
==== 1985-1999 ====
Year	Master of Photography	Applied/Fashion/ Advertising	Art	Photojournalism	Publication	Young Photographer	Lifetime Achievement	Design	Writing
1985	André Kertész	Sarah Moon	David Hockney	Alberto Venzago	Photo Poche	Masaaki Mayazawa	No award given	No award given	No award given
1986	Hiroshi Hamaya	No award given	Lucas Samaras	Sebastião Salgado	W. Eugene Smith; Let Truth Be the Prejudice: W. Eugene Smith, His Life and Photographs	Anthony Suau	Edward K. Thompson	Alan Richardson	No award given
1987	Manuel Álvarez Bravo	Jay Maisel	Robert Rauschenberg	Eugene Richards	Robert Frank; New York to Nova Scotia	Paul Graham	Harold Edgerton	Hans-Georg Pospischil	No award given
1988	Alfred Eisenstaedt	Guy Bourdin	Georges Rousse; Joel-Peter Witkin	Sebastião Salgado	Richard Misrach; Desert Cantos	Marc Trivier	Edwin H. Land	Werner Jeker	Peter Galassi
1989	Berenice Abbott	Joyce Tenneson	Arnulf Rainer	James Nachtwey	Josef Koudelka; Exiles	Pablo Cabado	Alexander Liberman	Michael Rand	John Szarkowski
1990	Yousuf Karsh	Annie Leibovitz	Chuck Close	Jacques Langevin	Sarah Greenough; Joel Snyder; On the Art of Fixing a Shadow: One Hundred and Fifty Years of Photography	Miro Svolik	Gordon Parks	No award given	Max Kozloff
1991	Harry Callahan	Herb Ritts	Duane Michals	Antonin Kratochvil	Sylvia Plachy; Sylvia Plachy's Unguided Tour	Walter Dhladhla	Andreas Feininger	Gran Fury	Anna Fárová
1992	Lennart Nilsson	Oliviero Toscani	Doug Starn; Mike Starn	Christopher Morris	Irving Penn; Passage: A Work Record	Klaus Reisinger	Carl Mydans	Gunter Rambow	Alan Trachtenberg
1993	Richard Avedon	Geof Kern	Anselm Kiefer	James Nachtwey	Jane Livingston; The New York School: Photographs, 1936-1963	Nick Waplington	Stefan Lorant	David Carson	Arthur C. Danto
1994	Henri Cartier-Bresson	Bruce Weber	Cindy Sherman	Hans-Jürgen Burkard	Sebastião Salgado; Lelia Wanick Salgado; Workers: An Archaeology of the Industrial Age	Fazal Sheikh	Howard Chapnick	No award given	Maria Morris Hambourg; Pierre Apraxine
1995	Eve Arnold	Josef Astor	Clarissa Sligh	Gilles Peress	Eugene Richards; Americans We: Photographs and Notes	Sean Doyle	John Szarkowski	Yolanda Cuomo	Deborah Willis
1996	Horst P. Horst	Wolfgang Volz	Annette Messager	Lise Sarfati	Gilles Peress; The Silence	Eva Leitolf	Cornell Capa	Markus Rasp	A. D. Coleman
1997	Helen Levitt	David LaChapelle	Christian Boltanski	Mary Ellen Mark	Chris Riley; Douglas Niven; The Killing Fields	Lauren Greenfield	Robert Delpire	Chip Kidd	Vicki Goldberg
1998	Roy DeCarava	Inez van Lamsweerde; Vinoodh Matadin	Sigmar Polke	Steve Hart	Horst Faas; Tim Page; Requiem: By the Photographers Who Died in Vietnam and Indochina	Michael Ackerman	Naomi Rosenblum; Walter Rosenblum	J. Abbott Miller	Robert Coles
1999	Arnold Newman	Julius Shulman	Hiroshi Sugimoto	Alexandra Boulat	Charles Bowden; Juárez: The Laboratory of Our Future	Nicolai Fuglsig	Harold Evans	Bart Houtman; Guido van Lier	John Morris

==== 2000-present ====
In 2000, the Cornell Capa Award was introduced, which later merged with the Lifetime Achievement award into the Cornell Capa Lifetime Achievement, later renamed back to Lifetime Achievement.

Year	Cornell Capa Award	Lifetime Achievement	Applied/Fashion/Advertising	Art	Photojournalism	Publication	Writing	Young Photographer	Trustee Award	Contemporary Photography and New Media	Commercial and Editorial Photography
2000	Robert Frank	Nathan Lyons	Hubble Heritage Project	Adam Fuss	James Nachtwey	Manfred Heiting; Helmut Newton Work	Andy Grundberg	Zach Gold	No award given	No award given	No award given
2001	Mary Ellen Mark	Roger Thérond	Philip-Lorca diCorcia	Andreas Gursky	Luc Delahaye	Jeff L. Rosenheim; Douglas Eklund; Unclassified: A Walker Evans Anthology	Eugenia Parry	Elinor Carucci	No award given	No award given	No award given
2002	Here is New York: a democracy of photographs	Michael E. Hoffman	RJ Muna	Shirin Neshat	Tyler Hicks	Robert Lebeck; Bodo von Dewitz; Kiosk: A History of Photojournalism	Ariella Azoulay	Lynsey Addario	No award given	No award given	No award given
2003	Marc Riboud	Bernd Becher; Hilla Becher	Thái Công	Zarina Bhimji	Alex Majoli	Deirdre O'Callaghan; Hide That Can	Sara Stevenson	Jonas Bendiksen	No award given	No award given	No award given
2004	Josef Koudelka	William Eggleston	Alison Jackson	Fiona Tan	Simon Norfolk	Doon Arbus; Elisabeth Sussman; Diane Arbus: Revelations	Susan Sontag	Tomoko Sawada	No award given	No award given	No award given
2005	Susan Meiselas	Bruce Weber	Deborah Turbeville	Loretta Lux	The New Yorker	Henryk Ross; Łódź Ghetto Album	Vince Aletti	Tomás Munita	No award given	No award given	No award given
2006	Don McCullin	Lee Friedlander	Steven Meisel	Thomas Ruff	Yuri Kozyrev	Mary Panzer; Christian Caujolle; Things As They Are: Photojournalism in Context Since 1955	Geoff Dyer	Ahmet Polat	Getty Images	No award given	No award given
2007	Milton Rogovin	William Klein	No award given	Tracey Moffatt	No award given	Tendance Floue; Sommes-Nous?	David Levi Strauss	Ryan McGinley	Karl Lagerfeld	No award given	No award given
2008	No award given	Malick Sidibé	Craig McDean	Edward Burtynsky	Anthony Suau	Taryn Simon; An American Index of the Hidden and Unfamiliar	Bill Jay	Mikhael Subotzky	Diane Keaton	No award given	No award given
2009	Letizia Battaglia	Annie Leibovitz	Tim Walker	Rinko Kawauchi	Geert van Kesteren	Aglaia Konrad; Desert Cities	Aveek Sen	Lieko Shiga	Gayle G. Greenhill	No award given	No award given
2010	Peter Magubane	John G. Morris	Daniele Tamagni	Lorna Simpson	Reza	Sarah Greenough; Looking In: Robert Frank's "The Americans"	Lucy Sante	Raphaël Dallaporta	Gilbert C. Maurer	No award given	No award given
2011	Ruth Gruber	Elliott Erwitt	Viviane Sassen	Abelardo Morell	Adrees Latif	Alec Soth	Gerry Badger	Peter van Agtmael	The Durst Family	No award given	No award given
2012	Ai Weiwei	Daido Moriyama	Maurice Scheltens; Liesbeth Abbenes	Stan Douglas	Benjamin Lowy	Museo Nacional Centro de Arte Reina Sofía; The Worker Photography Movement [1926–1939]	David Campany	Anouk Kruithof	John "Launny" Steffens	No award given	No award given
2013	David Goldblatt		Erik Madigan Heck	Mishka Henner	David Guttenfelder	Cristina de Middel; The Afronauts	No award given	Kitra Cahana	Pat Schoenfeld	No award given	No award given
2014	Jürgen Schadeberg		Steven Klein	James Welling	Stephanie Sinclair; Jessica Dimmock	Adam Broomberg; Oliver Chanarin; Holy Bible	No award given	Samuel James	No award given	No award given	No award given
2015	Graciela Iturbide		No award given	Larry Fink	Tomas van Houtryve	LaToya Ruby Frazier; The Notion of Family	No award given	Evgenia Arbugaeva	Getty Images; The Lean In Collection	Question Bridge; Black Males	No award given
2016	No award given	David Bailey	No award given	Walid Raad	Zanele Muholi	Matthew Connors; Fire in Cairo	Susan Schuppli	No award given	Artur Walther; The Walther Collection	Jonathan Harris; Gregor Hochmuth; Network Effect	No award given
2017	No award given	Harry Benson	No award given	Sophie Calle	Edmund Clark; Crofton Black; Negative Publicity	Michael Christopher Brown; Libyan Sugar	Michael Famighetti; Sarah Lewis; Vision & Justice; Aperture (no. 223, summer 2016)	Vasantha Yogananthan	No award given	For Freedoms	No award given
2018	No award given	Bruce Davidson	Alexandra Bell	Samuel Fosso	Amber Bracken	Dayanita Singh; Museum Bhavan	Maurice Berger; Race Stories; New York Times	Natalie Keyssar	Thomson Reuters	Women Photograph	No award given
2019	No award given	Rosalind Fox Solomon	No award given	Dawoud Bey	No award given	No award given	Zadie Smith; Deana Lawson’s Kingdom of Restored Glory; The New Yorker	Jess T. Dugan	No award given	No award given	No award given
2020	No award given	Don McCullin	Nadine Ijewere	Dawoud Bey	Hannah Reyes Morales	No award given	No award given	No award given	No award given	The 1619 Project; New York Times	
2021	No award ceremony										
2022	No award given	Sebastião Salgado	No award given	Sky Hopinka	Acacia Johnson	No award given	No award given	Esther Horvath	Gabriela Hearst	No award given	No award given
2023	No award given	Ming Smith	No award given	No award given	Zora J. Murff	No award given	Ariella Aïsha Azoulay	No award given	Joyce Cowin	Poulomi Basu	No award given
2024	No award given	Shirin Neshat	No award given	No award given	Lynsey Addario	No award given	No award given	No award given	Caryl S. Englander	Wendy Red Star	Renell Medrano
2025	No award given	Susan Meiselas	No award given	No award given	Samar Abu Elouf, Nanna Heitmann and Ziv Koren	No award given	No award given	No award given	No award given	Lebohang Kganye	Jack Davison
2026	No award given	Joel Meyerowitz	No award given	No award given	Haruka Sakaguchi	No award given	No award given	No award given	No award given	Tarrah Krajnak	Collier Schorr

== Permanent collection ==
The permanent collection at ICP contains more than 200,000 photographs and related materials from the earliest forms of photography to contemporary work. Since its opening in 1974, ICP has acquired important historical and contemporary images through an acquisitions committee and through donations and bequests from photographers and collectors. The collection spans the history of photography, including daguerrotypes, gelatin silver and digital chromogenic prints.

The collection is strongest in its holdings of American and European documentary photography of the 1930s to the 1990s. It comprises large bodies of work by W. Eugene Smith, Henri Cartier-Bresson, Robert Capa, the Farm Security Administration photographers, Alfred Eisenstaedt, Lisette Model, Gordon Parks, James VanDerZee, Louise Ozelle Martin, and Garry Winogrand. More recent purchases have included work by contemporary photographers such as Carrie Mae Weems, Justine Kurland, Katy Grannan, Vik Muniz, and Susan Meiselas.

Another component of the collection is a significant group of photographically illustrated magazines, particularly those published between World War I and II, such as Vu, Regards, Picture Post, Lilliput, Berliner Illustrirte Zeitung, Arbeiter-Illustrierte-Zeitung, and Life.

Opened in 2015, the International Center of Photography at Mana Contemporary is a 15,000-square-foot space that houses the permanent collection, a media lab, areas for research, and a gallery.

== Publications ==
In 2003 the ICP joined with the publisher Steidl of Göttingen, Germany to launch the photography imprint ICP/Steidl.

=== ICP/Steidl publications ===
- "Strangers: The First ICP Triennial of Photography and Video." 2003.
- Young America: The Daguerreotypes of Southworth and Hawes. 2005. Edited by Grant Romer and Brian Wallis. OCLC 60805129. Received New England Historical Society's Best Book of the Year and Kraszna-Krausz Book Award's Honorable Mention.
- "Ecotopia: The Second ICP Triennial of Photography and Video." 2006
- Atta Kim: On Air. 2006. By Atta Kim. Received the Deutsche Börse Prize: Best Photo Book of the Year.
- Unknown Weegee. 2006. By Weegee. Received College Art Association Best Book Design, Honorable Mention.
- Snap Judgments: New Positions in Contemporary African Photography. 2006. Edited by Okwui Enwezor. Received the PHotoEspaña: Best International Photography Book of the Year.
- Susan Meiselas: In History. 2008. Received the Rencontres d’Arles 2009 Historical Book Award.
- The Mexican Suitcase: The Rediscovered Spanish Civil War Negatives of Capa, Chim, and Taro. 2010. Received the AAM's Frances Smyth-Ravenel Prize for Excellence in Publication Design and the German Photobook 2011 Prize's Gold Award.

=== Other ICP publications ===
- Reflections in a Glass Eye. ICP/Little, Brown, 1999. Edited by Ellen Handy.
- "A Different Kind of Order: The ICP Triennial" New York: ICP/Delmonico Books Prestel, 2013.
- Roman Vishniac Rediscovered. New York: ICP/Delmonico Books Prestel, 2015. Edited by Maya Benton.

=== DVD ===
- The Decisive Moment (2007) by Henri Cartier-Bresson.

== ICP's Library ==
The Library of the International Center of Photography serves more than 6,000 visitors a year. The information and bibliographic resources it provides are used by ICP staff, patrons, and researchers. As of 2008, the Library receives 75 periodicals and serials, and its collection of approximately 20,000 volumes and 2,000 files is available for on-site perusal.

== The GEH–ICP Alliance ==
In 2000, George Eastman House (GEH) and ICP launched the GEH–ICP Alliance, whose fundamental aim is to enhance public understanding and appreciation of photography, through exhibitions, publications, research, scholarship, collection sharing, and the joint website Photomuse.org.

== See also ==
- List of museums and cultural institutions in New York City

== Notes ==
1. Applied
2. Author's Book
3. Cornell Capa Lifetime Achievement
4. Contemporary Photography and New Media
5. Critical Writing and Research
6. Critical Writing, Research, and Theory
7. Documentary and Photojournalism
8. Documentary Practice and Photojournalism
9. Documentary Practice and Visual Journalism
10. Emerging Photographer
11. Online Platform and New Media
12. New Media
13. The 1999 ceremony featured a special presentation from L. Fritz Gruber.
14. The 2002 ceremony featured a special presentation, The New York Times' Portraits of Grief.
15. The 2013 ceremony featured a special presentation from Jeff Bridges
16. The 2015 ceremony featured a special presentation from Mario Testino
17. The 2018 ceremony featured a special presentation from Juergen Teller
18. The 2019 ceremony featured a special presentation from Shahidul Alam
