= European Publishers Award for Photography =

European photography award

The European Publishers Award for Photography was run for 22 years by a number of European publishers, who simultaneously published a photobook of each year's winning portfolio in their own languages.

The award was for work on a particular subject that had not previously been published as a book. In its later years it was open to photographers anywhere: European nationality or residence was not required.

The award began in 1994 with six publishers. At the time of its apparent end in 2015, two publishers, Dewi Lewis (Britain) and Peliti Associati (Italy) had participated every year since the start. In Germany, Edition Braus published the award-winner from 1994 until 2010 (in 1998 and 1999, as Umschau Braus); Kehrer Verlag took over in 2011. In France, Marval published the winner from 1994 to 1996, Fernand Hazan in 1997 and 1998, and Actes Sud thereafter. In Spain, Lunwerg Editores published the winner from 1994 to 2010; and, after a break of one year, Editorial Blume resumed in 2012. Five publishers, in five nations, were involved in 2015.

There had also been participation from Dutch and Greek publishers. In the Netherlands, Stichting Fragment Foto published the first two winners, and Focus Publishing (Uitgeverij Focus) the third; Mets & Schilt published the winner from 2006 to 2008. In Greece, Apeiron Photos published the winner from 2003 to 2010.

The award was for some years associated with Leica: the published winner from both 1996 and 1999 acknowledge the support of Leica; (Note: Bruce Gilden, Haiti (Dewi Lewis, 1996): "With support of Leica" (copyright page). Jeff Mermelstein, SideWalk (Umschau Braus, 1999): "mit Unterstützung von Leica" (last, unnumbered page). Presumably "Leica" referred to Ernst Leitz at the outset and Leica Camera thereafter.) and in 2006, the award was renamed the Leica European Publishers Award for Photography. This lasted until 2008; "Leica" was dropped from the name for 2009.

The award also had support from other corporations. (Note: Klavdij Sluban, Go east (Braus, 2009, unnumbered reverse of p. 115) says "Mit freundlicher Unterstützung von Heidelberg", i.e. Heidelberger Druckmaschinen.)

As 2016 ended, no award for the year had been announced and Kehrer was describing the annual award in the past tense but allowing for the possibility of a resumption: "The Award is currently under review. / A further announcement will be made in Fall 2016."

== Award winners ==
year	winner	subject/theme	Germany (German)	Britain (English)	Spain (Spanish/ Catalan (Note: Spanish unless noted otherwise.))	France (French)	Italy (Italian)	Netherlands (Dutch)	Greece (Greek)	also shortlisted
1994	Dario Mitidieri (Note: All the previous winners are listed in "Previous winners", European Publishers Award for Photography, archived by the Wayback Machine on 15 February 2015.)	the street children of Bombay	Kinder von Bombay ISBN 3-89466-104-6	Children of Bombay ISBN 1-899235-00-0	Los niños de Bombay ISBN 84-7782-305-7	Enfants de Bombay ISBN 2-86234-160-6	I bambini di Bombay ISBN 88-85121-21-7	De kinderen van Bombay ISBN 90-75244-01-0, ISBN 90-75244-03-7		
1995	Shanta Rao	women in Ethiopia and Mauritius	Queens of Saba ISBN 3-89466-141-0	Stories of women ISBN 1-899235-30-2	Reina de África ISBN 84-7782-362-6	Alemshaye et autres histoires de femmes ISBN 2-86234-184-3	Donne d'Africa ISBN 88-85121-28-4	Vrouwenverhalen ISBN 90-75244-05-3		
1996	Bruce Gilden	violence and voodoo (Note: "Voodoo" is the spelling used in the book.) in Haiti	Haiti ISBN 3-89466-167-4	Haiti ISBN 1-899235-55-8	Haiti ISBN 84-7782-398-7	Haïti ISBN 2-86234-221-1	Haiti ISBN 88-85121-35-7	Haïti ISBN 90-72216-81-4		
1997	Toni Catany	"portraits, nudes and still lives", using a process based on Calotype	Photographs ISBN 3-89466-204-2	Life and still life ISBN 1-899235-41-8	Fotografies (Note: In Catalan.) ISBN 84-7782-472-X	Photographies ISBN 2-85025-580-7	Nature in posa ISBN 88-85121-40-3			
1998	Dean Chapman	the Karen people and their struggle against the Burmese state	Karenni: Guerilla in Burma ISBN 3-8295-6802-9	Karenni ISBN 1-899235-96-5	Karenni ISBN 84-7782-519-X	Karenni ISBN 2-85025-599-8	Karenni ISBN 88-85121-47-0			
1999	Jeff Mermelstein	New York City street photographs	Sidewalk ISBN 3-8295-6823-1	Sidewalk ISBN 1-899235-62-0	Sidewalk: Pateando Nueva York ISBN 84-7782-630-7	Sidewalk ISBN 2-7427-2581-4	Sidewalk: Per le strade di New York ISBN 88-85121-54-3			
2000	Alfons Alt	portraits of individual animals	Bestiarium ISBN 3-926318-63-5	The nature of the beast ISBN 1-899235-43-4	Bestias ISBN 84-7782-707-9	Bestiae ISBN 2-7427-2840-6	Bestiae ISBN 88-85121-64-0			
2001	David Farrell	sites of violence and tragedy during the "troubles" in northern Ireland	Innocent landscapes = Unschuldige Landschaften ISBN 3-926318-54-6	Innocent landscapes ISBN 1-899235-88-4	Paisajes inocentes ISBN 84-7782-797-4	Innocents paysages ISBN 2-7427-3487-2	Paesaggi innocenti ISBN 88-85121-71-3			
2002	Simon Norfolk	the old and new ruins of Afghanistan	Afghanistan zero ISBN 3-89904-025-2	Afghanistan chronotopia ISBN 1-899235-54-X	Afganistán chronotopia ISBN 84-7782-550-5	Afghanistan chronotopia ISBN 2-7427-4051-1	Afganistan zero ISBN 88-85121-79-9			
2003	Haris Kakarouhas	portraits and still lifes showing the timelessness of Cuba	Buena Vista Cuba ISBN 3-89904-078-3	Suspended time: A Cuban portrait ISBN 1-904587-05-4	Tiempo en suspenso: Un retrato de Cuba ISBN 84-9785-016-5	Le temps suspendu: Un portrait de Cuba ISBN 2-7427-4671-4	Il tempo sospeso. Un ritratto di Cuba ISBN 88-85121-89-6		Μετέωρος χρόνος. Κούβα ISBN 960-87442-5-3	
2004	Harri Kallio	reconstructed views of the dodo in Mauritius	Der Dodo auf Mauritius. Die Wiedergeburt eines ausgestorbenen Vogels ISBN 3-89904-118-6	The dodo and Mauritius island: Imaginary encounters ISBN 1-904587-13-5	El pájaro dodo y la Isla Mauricio: Encuentros imaginarios ISBN 84-9785-110-2	À la recherche du dodo: enquête, récit, photographies ISBN 2-7427-5222-6	Il dodo e l'isola di Mauritius: Incontri immaginari ISBN 88-85121-96-9		Το Ντόντο και το νησί Μαυρίκιος ISBN 960-87442-6-1	
2005	Lorenzo Castore	Havana and elsewhere in Cuba	Paradiso ISBN 3-89904-183-6	Paradiso ISBN 1-904587-26-7	Paradiso ISBN 84-9785-196-X	Paradiso ISBN 2-7427-5729-5	Paradiso ISBN 88-89412-07-0		Paradiso ISBN 960-87442-7-X	
2006	Ambroise Tézenas	night views of Beijing	Peking. Théâtre du peuple ISBN 3-89904-228-X	Beijing: Theatre of the people ISBN 1-904587-36-4	Pekín, teatro del pueblo ISBN 84-9785-330-X	Pékin, théâtre du peuple ISBN 2-7427-6385-6	Pechino, teatro del popolo ISBN 88-89412-23-2	De hutongs van Peking ISBN 9053305270	Πεκίνο, σκηνικά μιας μετάβασης ISBN 960-87442-9-6	
2007	Paolo Pellegrin	"In Cambodia, Uganda, Kosovo and a host of other countries racked by wars and epidemics, Paolo Pellegrin is out to cover . . . the specificities and singularities of events, situations and faces . . ."	As I was dying ISBN 3-89904-284-0	As I was dying ISBN 1-904587-55-0	As I was dying ISBN 84-9785-418-7	Alors que je mourais ISBN 2-7427-7013-5	As I was dying ISBN 88-89412-12-7	As I was dying ISBN 9053305807	As I was dying ISBN 960-89773-1-2	
2008	Jacob Aue Sobol	encounters in Tokyo	I, Tokyo ISBN 3-89904-340-5	I, Tokyo ISBN 1-904587-68-2	Tokio ISBN 84-9785-533-7	Tokyo ISBN 2-7427-7840-3	Io, Tokyo ISBN 88-89412-30-5	Ik, Tokyo ISBN 9053306552	Εγώ, Τόκυο ISBN 960-89773-6-3	Gautier Deblonde, Balazs Gardi, Maya Goded, Zed Nelson, Mark Power, Rafael Trobat
2009	Klavdij Sluban	journeys along the rail routes from east Europe to east Asia	Go east ISBN 3-89466-306-5	East to east ISBN 1-904587-84-4	Al este del este ISBN 84-9785-543-4	Transsibériades ISBN 2-7427-8664-3	All'est dell'est ISBN 88-89412-38-0		Πέραν της ανατολής ISBN 960-89773-7-1	Paula Bronstein, Luca Campigotto, Olivier Culmann, Olivier Pin-Fat, Fabio Ponzio, Carlos Spottorno
2010	Christophe Agou	life in the Forez hills (massif central, central France)	Gesichter der Stille ISBN 3862280039	In the face of silence ISBN 1-907893-04-0	Ante el silencio ISBN 84-9785-718-6	Face au silence ISBN 2-7427-9542-1	Di fronte al silenzio ISBN 88-89412-47-X		Aπέναντι Στη Σιωπή ISBN 960-94490-2-6	Claudio Rasano, Nikos Markou, Davide Monteleone, Stanley Greene, Serguei Bykov, Martin Weber (withdrew)
2011	Davide Monteleone	Chechnya and the north Caucasus	Rote Distel ISBN 3868282947	Red thistle ISBN 1-907893-16-4		Chardon rouge ISBN 2-330-00210-6	Cardo rosso ISBN 88-89412-53-4			Stephen Dupont, Celine Marchbank, Michael Martin, Rania Matar, Paolo Ventura, Riccardo Venturi
2012	Alessandro Imbriaco	"a small swamp under a flyover on the ring road circling the eastern outskirts of Rome – a failed nature reserve that ended up protecting [a family]"	Der Garten ISBN 386828348X	The garden ISBN 1-907893-27-X	El jardín ISBN 8498016703	Le jardin ISBN 2-330-01230-6	Il giardino ISBN 88-89412-21-6			Luca Desienna, Zoltán Jókay, Fernando Moleres, Kosuke Okahara, Guillaume Simoneau, Kurt Tong
2013	Alisa Resnik	St Petersburg and Berlin at night	One another ISBN 3868284281	One another ISBN 1-907893-44-X	El uno el otro ISBN 84-9801-739-4	L'un l'autre ISBN 2-330-02415-0	L'un l'altro ISBN 88-89412-54-2			Andrea Ferrari, Paul Gaffney, Carlos Spottorno, Ambroise Tézenas, Paolo Verzone, Fabian Weiss
2014	Kirill Golovchenko	"the lives of those who run roadside stalls in Ukraine – 'tochka', where they sell fruit according to the season and often far more"	Bitter Honeydew ISBN 978-3-86828-525-3	Bitter honeydew ISBN 978-1-907893-68-1	Melones de hiel ISBN 978-84-9801-833-2	Melons amers ISBN 978-2-330-03698-0	Il gusto amaro del melone ISBN 978-88-89412-64-0			Martin Bogren, Harry Borden, Stephen Dupont, Adam Ferguson, Jörg Klaus, Mafalda Rakos + Ivna Vieira
2015	Danila Tkachenko	"project Restricted Areas"	Restricted Areas ISBN 978-3-86828-653-3	Restricted areas ISBN 978-1-907893-82-7	Zona restringida ISBN 978-84-9801-908-7	Restricted areas ISBN 978-2-330-05698-8	Restricted areas ISBN 978-88-89412-70-1			Jon Lowenstein, Carl Bigmore, Dougie Wallace, Javier Argennilace, Guilame Bression and Carlos Ayesta, Simone Ghizzone
