= Zora J. Murff =

American photographer and educator

Zora J Murff
- Born: 1987 (age 38–39); Des Moines, Iowa, U.S.
- Education: Iowa State University (BS); University of Iowa (BA); University of Nebraska–Lincoln (MFA)
- Website: www.zora-murff.com

Zora J Murff (born 1987) is an American artist, curator, and educator. As of 2026, he is based in Eugene, Oregon and teaches photography at the University of Oregon's School of Art + Design. Murff uses his creative practice to emphasize visual culture's entanglements with race, capitalism, and other forms of hierarchical oppression. Murff studied and has practiced photography expansively including collage and assemblage, but he also works with sculpture, installation, text works, and sound. Murff has also taught photography at the University of Arkansas' School of Art, the School of the Museum of Fine Arts at Tufts University.

== Life and work ==
Murff was born in 1987 in Des Moines, Iowa, to an African-American working class family. He studied for a BS in psychology from Iowa State University.

Following his graduation in 2010, took a job as a Tracker for Linn County Juvenile Detention and Diversion Services in Cedar Rapids, Iowa. Murff enrolled at the University of Iowa to study photography at the same time. He photographed the children that he worked with, which resulted in Corrections, his final-year BA project, "about a system that too often fails the disenfranchised youth to whom it has a duty of care". The Corrections photo series images were taken from 2013 to 2015. "about a system that too often fails the disenfranchised youth to whom it has a duty of care". The Corrections photo series images were taken from 2013 to 2015, and explores a "contradictory relationship that Murff acknowledges [...], between his effort to build trust with the young people and his position as a tracker to make sure they followed court orders, while securing their willingness to be photographed." He published the work as a monograph in 2015 with Aint-Bad Magazine. Murff has continued to create work about incarceration in America.

After concluding his studies at the University of Iowa, Murff enrolled in the MFA studio art program at the University of Nebraska–Lincoln. In April 2018, he launched his thesis exhibition Re-Making the Mark, a mixture of photography and sculpture focused on the historical impacts of redlining in North Omaha, a Historically African-American neighborhood in Omaha, Nebraska. His second monograph Lost: Omaha, includes some work from Re-Making the Mark. His later monograph, At No Point In Between also includes work originally contained within his series Lost: Omaha. At No Point In Between won the Independent category of the 2019 Lucie Foundation Photobook Prize. In 2020, Murff won the Next Step Award, a collaborative award between Aperture Foundation, 7|G Foundation, and the Baxter Street Camera Club of New York, meant, "...to identify strong emerging or evolving voices whose work deserves greater recognition." As a part of the award, Murff published his fourth monograph, True Colors (or, Affirmations in a Crisis) with Aperture Foundation. The publication is a survey of the artist's practice and visual culture and includes multiple contributions from other artists and writers. Murff's debut museum solo exhibition, RACE/HUSTLE, opened at the Massachusetts Museum of Contemporary Art in 2025. The exhibition was curated by Terence Washington and examines, "...physical, psychic, and political violence, the rhythms and resonances of oppression throughout history and into the present, and the harmful desires that our visual culture cultivates."

Murff taught Photography at the University of Arkansas School of Art from 2018–2023 and at the School of the Museum of Fine Arts at Tufts University from 2023–2025. In 2025, he joined the faculty at the University of Oregon. He was also a co-curator of Strange Fire Artist Collective (formed in 2015) with artists Jess T. Dugan and Rafael Soldi, and curator Hamidah Glasgow and departed the collective in 2020. In 2019, he was an artist-in-resident at Light Work in Syracuse, NY. In 2024, Murff was an artist-in-residence at the Center for Photography at Woodstock. In 2023, Murff was awarded the Documentary Practice and Visual Journalism Infinity Award from the International Center of Photography.

== Publications of Individual Work ==
- Corrections. Savanna, GA: Aint-Bad, 2015. ISBN 978-1-944005-01-6. Edition of 450 copies. With a foreword by Pete Brook.
- Lost: Omaha. Brooklyn, NY: Kris Graves, 2018. One volume in a collection of 10. With an essay by Lisa Riordan Seville. OCLC 1035555819. First edition, 125 copies. First edition (second printing), 100 copies.
- At No Point In Between. Dais, 2019. ISBN 978-1-7339499-1-0. With an essay by Terence Washington and an afterword by Lisa Riordan Seville. Edition of 155 copies.
- True Colors (or, Affirmations in a Crisis). Brooklyn, NY: Aperture, 2022. ISBN 978-1-59711-517-9. First edition.

== Publication as Author ==
- Murff, Young, et al., Take It From Here. Columbia, MO: There, There Now, 2020. Edition of 200.
- Murff, "Pastoral Counterinsurgency: Review of Tyler Mitchell's 'Ghost Images' at Gagosian Gallery," DEAR DAVE, Magazine, 2025.
- Murff, "The Education of Harlan Bozeman" DEAR DAVE, Magazine, Issue No. 37, 2024.
- Murff, Bengal, and Leonard, "LaToya Ruby Frazier's Steady Gaze," Magazine, MoMA, 2024.

== Exhibitions as Artist ==
=== Solo Exhibitions ===
- RACE/HUSTLE, MASS MoCA, North Adams, Massachusetts, 2025
- The Devil Hiding in Plain Sight, Roger Glass Center for the Arts, University of Dayton, Dayton, Ohio, 2024
- We Here for Some Jive Conspiracy, Webber Gallery, Los Angeles, California, 2023
- At No Point In Between, West Virginia University, Morgantown, West Virginia, 2022
- American Mother, American Father, Belfast Photo Festival, Belfast, Ireland, 2022
- Bold As Brass (or, Third Year Review), Baxter Street Camera Club of New York, New York, New York, 2021
- At No Point In Between, Webber Gallery, London, United Kingdom, 2021
- Re-Making the Mark, Gregory Allicar Museum, Fort Collins, Colorado, 2019
- Corrections, Center for Fine Art Photography, Fort Collins, Colorado, 2016
- Corrections, Filter Space, Chicago, Illinois, 2016

=== Two & Three Person Exhibitions ===
- Fade Like a Sigh: Zora J Murff & Rana Young, Greenwood Community College, Greenwood, Massachusetts, 2024
- Fade Like a Sigh: Zora J Murff & Rana Young, Spellerberg Projects, Lockheart, Texas, 2021
- Talking Back: Zora J Murff & Rana Young, Brick City Galleries, Missouri State University, Springfield, Missouri, 2020
- Fade Like a Sigh: Zora J Murff & Rana Young, Kimmel Harding Nelson Center for the Arts, Nebraska, City, Nebraska, 2017

=== Group Exhibitions ===
- Truth Told Slant, High Museum of Art, Atlanta, Georgia, 2024
- A Long Arc: Photography and the American South since 1845, High Museum of Art, Atlanta, Georgia, 2023
- Intimate Strangers, Yancey Richardson Gallery, New York, New York, 2023
- LagosPhoto2023, African Artists Foundation, Lagos, Nigeria, 2023
- America in Crisis, Saatchi Gallery, London, United Kingdom, 2022
- Prison Nation, Davis Museum, Wellesley College, Wellesley, Massachusetts, 2022
- Family Album, LACMA, Los Angeles, California, 2022
- American Epidemic: Guns in the United States, Museum of Contemporary Photography, Chicago, Illinois, 2021
- At No Point In Between, Louis Roederer Award Exhibition, Rencontres d'Arles, Arles, France, 2021
- Companion Pieces: New Photography 2020, MoMA, New York, New York, 2020

== Exhibitions as Curator/Co-Curator ==
- A Terrible Beauty: Hannah Altman, Eduardo L Rivera & Rana Young, Well Gallery, SMFA at Tufts University, Boston, Massachusetts, 2024, Co-Curators: Andrew J. Bailey, Yuxuan Cai, William C. Casey, Niko Krivanek, Amy Ma, Nicol Mai, Barkat Mehra, Justin Musyimi, Matilda Peng, Karen M. Salam
- Take It From Here, Abakus Projects, Boston, Massachusetts, 2024, Co-Curator: Rana Young
- 2023 VCP Open Juried Exhibition, Vermont Center for Photography, Brattleboro, Vermont, 2023
- Points of Departure, Visible Records, Charlottesville, Virginia, 2022, Co-Curators: Jay Simple, Sydney Ellison, and Ally Caple
- Collective Interventions: On Past, Present and Future Topographics, Fine Arts Gallery, University of Arkansas, Fayetteville, Arkansas, 2021, Co-Curators: Charles Krampah (MFA 2022), Kalyn Barnoski (MFA 2021), Miki Skak (MFA 2023), Sky Maggiore (MFA 2023), Tay Butler (MFA 2022)

== Collections ==
- Victoria & Albert Museum
- National Gallery of Art
- Studio Museum in Harlem
- San Francisco Museum of Modern Art
- Denver Museum of Art
- Los Angeles County Museum of Art
- Museum of Contemporary Photography
