= Davide Monteleone =

Italian photographer (born 1974)

- Born: 1974 (age 51–52)
- Occupation: Photographer

Davide Monteleone (born 1974) is an Italian visual artist, researcher, and National Geographic Fellow. His multidisciplinary work encompasses photography, visual journalism, writing, and interdisciplinary projects, focusing on themes such as geopolitics, geography, identity, data, and science.

== Early life and education ==
Monteleone was born in Italy. He initially pursued engineering studies but later shifted his focus to photography and journalism, studying in the United States and the United Kingdom. He holds a Master's in art and politics from Goldsmiths, University of London.

== Career ==
In 2000, Monteleone began his career, collaborating with various Italian and international publications. By the end of 2001, he moved to Moscow, where he resided until 2021, immersing himself in Russian culture and society. This experience significantly influenced his subsequent work, leading to the publication of his first book, Dusha ("Soul"), in 2007.

Monteleone has produced several monographs, including Red Thistle (2012), Spasibo (2013), and The April Theses (2017). His projects often explore complex narratives that merge visual storytelling with investigative research. In 2022, he released Sinomocene, a data-driven investigation into China's economic expansion, presented as both an exhibition and a book.

In 2024, Monteleone completed Critical Minerals—Geography of Energy, an exploration into the geopolitical and environmental stakes of energy transition resources, continuing his examination of climate and economic impacts on a global scale.

In 2013 Monteleone appeared in the series of 12 episode of "Fotografi" for Sky Arte.

== Exhibitions and recognition ==
Monteleone's work has been featured in National Geographic, Time, and The New Yorker. His exhibitions have been shown in the Saatchi Gallery in London, the Nobel Peace Center in Oslo, the Maison Européenne de la Photographie in Paris, and the Palazzo delle Esposizioni in Rome.

== Awards and honours ==
Throughout his career, Monteleone has received numerous accolades, including:

- 2024: Winner, Leica Oskar Barnack Award
- 2024: Deloitte Photo Grant
- 2024: Sony World Photography Awards
- 2019: National Geographic Storytelling Fellowship
- 2016: Asia Society Fellowship
- 2013: Carmignac Photojournalism Award

== Publications by Monteleone ==
- Душа (Dusha) = Anima russa. Rome: Edizioni Postcart, 2007. ISBN 8886795335. With text by Viktor Erofeev and Margherita Belgiojoso.
- La Linea Inesistente: Viaggio Lungo la ex Cortina di Ferro. Rome: Contrasto, 2009. ISBN 8869652378.
- Holler – Enel Contemporanea – H+, 2012.
- Red Thistle, 2012.
  - Rote Distel. Heidelberg: Kehrer. ISBN 3868282947.
  - Red Thistle. Stockport: Dewi Lewis. ISBN 1-907893-16-4.
  - Chardon Rouge. Arles: Actes Sud. ISBN 2-330-00210-6.
  - Cardo Rosso. Rome: Peliti. ISBN 88-89412-53-4.
- Спасибо (Spasibo) = Spasibo. Heidelberg: Kehrer, 2013. ISBN 3868284664. With text in French and English by Galia Ackerman and Masha Gessen.
- The April Theses. Postcart, 2017.
- Sinomocene (2022)
- Critical Minerals. Geography of Energy (2024)

== Publications with contributions by Monteleone ==
- War is Only Half the Story: Ten Years of The Aftermath Project. Dewi Lewis, 2018. Poems by Wislawa Szymborska, texts by Clare Cavanagh, Donald Weber and Sara Terry and photographs by more than forty Aftermath Award winners.

== Awards ==
- 2005: Prize Amilcare Ponchielli "C’era una volta CCCP" 2nd prize at the Amilcare Ponchielli Milano
- 2006: World Press Photo Israeli bombing in Lebanon – 1° Prize Spot news stories
- 2007: TAF (Toscana Arti Fotografiche) prize, Lucca Digital Photo Fest, Lucca, for "Dusha – Russian Soul"
- 2008: IPA Award 2008 2nd place best book Dusha; 1st place general news editorial "Pakistan Turning Point"
- 2008: FotoGrafia-Book Award Best book at FotoGrafia Festival in Rome
- 2008: Premio Marco Bastianelli, for Dusha
- 2008: PDN Photo annual award Magazine Editorial Categories for Internazionale
- 2008: World Press Photo Abkhazia – 1° Prize General news stories
- 2009: Finalist for Aftermath Project grant, for "Fringe of Empire"
- 2009: Leica Oskar Barnack Award finalist "Russian Caucasus"
- 2010: Lumix Freelens Award Winner Freelens award "Northern Caucasus"
- 2010: Emerging Photographer Grant 2010 winner, Burn magazine, for "Northern Caucasus"
- 2010: Sony World Photography Awards: Professional Contemporary Issues Category, 2nd prize: "The Republic of Dagestan"
- 2011: Aftermath Project Grant Winner with "Red Thistle, The Northern Caucasus Journey"
- 2011 European Publishers Award for Photography "Red Thistle"
- 2011: Follow your convictions grant "Reversed See" – Maurice Lacroix – World Press Photo foundation
- 2011: World Press Photo Milan Fashion Week – 2nd Prize Art single
- 2012: EPEA 01 grant "Harragas"
- 2012: Awakening World Award, Tehran art project, Iran "Reversed see series": Photography section, best artist works
- 2013: Fondation Carmignac Photojournalism Award Spasibo
- 2013: POYi Feature Multimedia Story, second place, for "Nordic Odyssey: A Month at Sea". With Myles Kane, Kristina Budelis, Elissa Curtis, and The New Yorker
- 2014: Honorable mention Aperture Portfolio Prize, New York City
- 2014: PDN Best Book Award 2014, USA
- 2016: Fellowship Asia Society, ChinaFile, USA
- 2017: Finalist, W. Eugene Smith, W. Eugene Smith Memorial Fund, New York City
- 2017: Winner CodiceMIA, MIA Fair, Milano, Italy
- 2019: Finalist BMW Residency, Paris Photo, France
- 2019: National Geographic Storytelling Fellowship, USA
- 2020: Finalist, Leica Oskar Barnack Award, GE
- 2020: One of ten joint winners, Luis Roederer Discovery Award, Rencontres d'Arles, Arles, France

== Solo exhibitions ==
- Dusha, Lucca Foto Festival, Lucca, IT, 2007. Rencontres d'Arles, Arles, France; B gallery, Rome, 2008. Palazzo delle Esposizioni, Rome; Micamera, Milan, 2009. Casa studio Morandi, Modena, IT, 2013.
- La Linea Inesistente, Palazzo delle Esposizioni, Rome, 2009. Ortygia, Siracuse, IT, 2010.
- Ombre di Guerra, Rotonda della Besana, Milan, 2009. Maison européenne de la photographie, Paris, 2011.
- Red Thistle, Castello Estense, Ferrara, Italy, Festival giornalismo di Internazionale; Museum of Modern and Contemporary Art of Trento and Rovereto, Rovereto, IT; Lumix Festival, Hannover, 2010. Rencontres d'Arles, New York; VII Gallery, New York; Petite Noire Gallery, Paris; Freelens gallery, Hamburg, 2012. Bursa Festival, Bursa, TR; Officine Fotografiche, Rome; Micamera, Milan, 2013.
- Harragas, European photography Award, House of Photography, Hamburg, 2012; Nobel prize Center, Oslo, 2013.
- Spasibo, Chapelle de l'école de beaux arts, 2013. Saatchi Gallery, London; Frankfurt Photo Forum, Frankfurt; Rencontres d'Arles, Arles, France; Museo Messina, Milan, 2014.
