= Jeff Mermelstein =

American photographer

- Born: 1957 (age 68–69); New Brunswick, New Jersey, USA
- Known for: Photography
- Years active: 1981 – present

Jeff Mermelstein (born 1957) is an American photojournalist and street photographer, known for his work in New York City.

== Life and work ==
Mermelstein lives in Greenwood Heights, Brooklyn, New York.

Using the camera on an iPhone, he made a series of photographs of messages on people's phone screens in New York City. He began the series in October 2017 and published it periodically on Instagram, then as the book #nyc in 2020.

== Publications ==
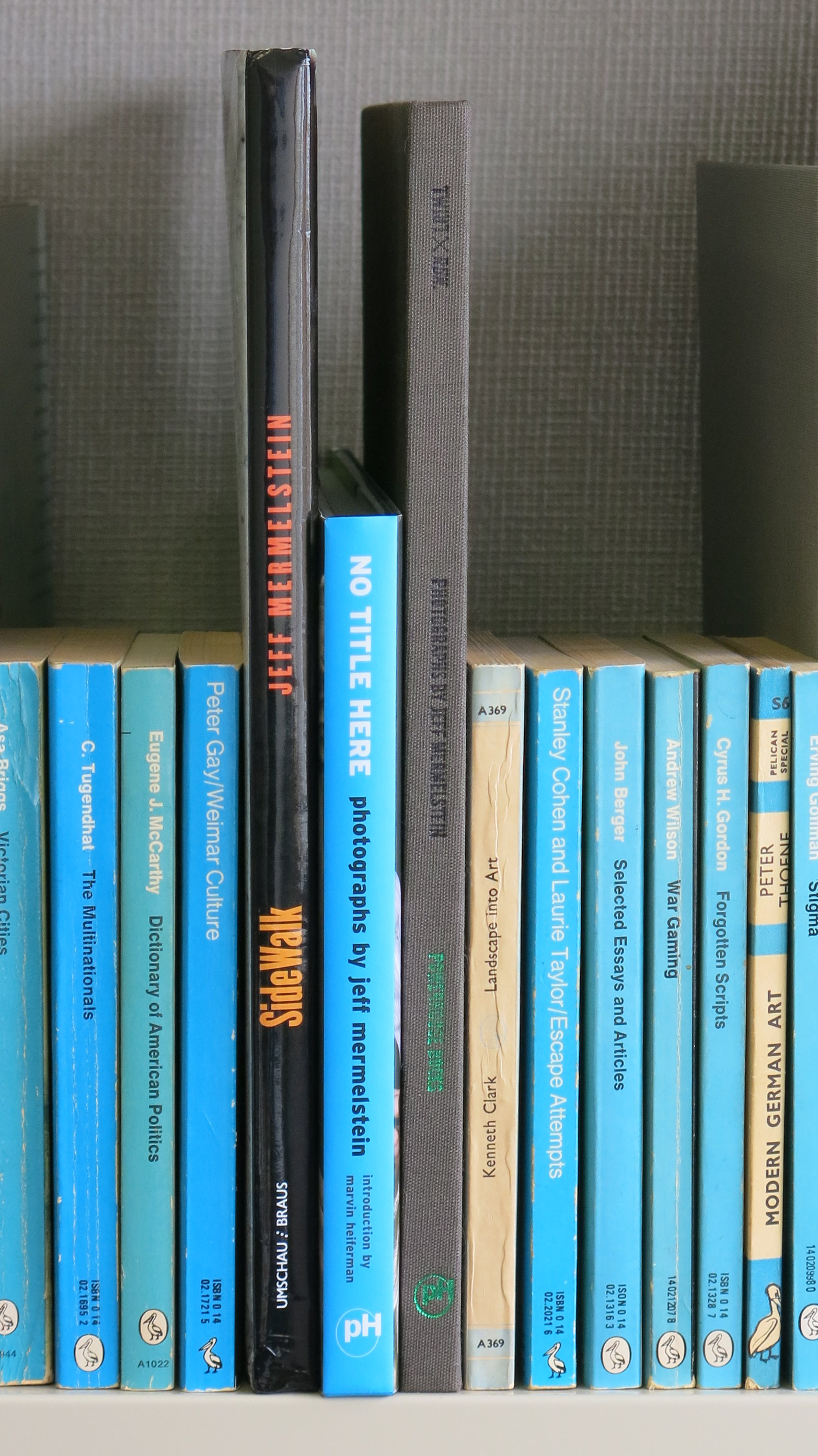
Three books by Mermelstein (among unrelated Pelicans)

=== Books by Mermelstein ===
- SideWalk.
  - Stockport: Dewi Lewis, 1999. ISBN 1899235620.
  - Arles: Actes Sud, 1999. ISBN 2742725814.
  - Frankfurt: Umschau/Braus, 1999. ISBN 3829568231.
  - Side Walk: Per le strade di New York. Rome: Peliti, 1999. ISBN 8885121543.
- No Title Here. New York: powerHouse, 2003. ISBN 1576871703.
- Twirl×Run. New York: powerHouse, 2009. ISBN 1576875180.
- Arena. TBW, 2019. ISBN 978-1-942953-37-1. With an afterword by Robert Slifkin.
- Hardened. London: Mörel, 2019. ISBN 9781907071645. Edited by David Campany.
- #nyc. London: Mack, 2020. ISBN 978-1-912339-86-0.

=== Other books with contributions by Mermelstein ===
- Sophie Howarth and Stephen McLaren, eds. Street Photography Now. London: Thames & Hudson, 2010; ISBN 0-500-54393-3 (English, hardback). London: Thames & Hudson, 2010; ISBN 2878113608 (French). London: Thames & Hudson, 2012; ISBN 0-500-28907-7 (English, paperback).

== Awards ==
- 1991: Aaron Siskind Foundation Individual Photographer's Fellowship
- 1998: European Publishers Award for Photography

== Exhibitions ==
=== Solo ===
- Color Photographs, Dance Theater Workshop Gallery; New York City, 1987
- Recent Color Photographs, The Camera Club of New York, New York City, 1991
- SideWalk, Italy, France, Ireland, Canada, 1999–2001
- Ground Zero, International Center of Photography, New York, 2002
- Jeff Mermelstein, Steven Kasher Gallery, New York City, 2006
