= Leica Oskar Barnack Award =

Photography award

Leica Oskar Barnack Award (LOBA)
- Description: Photography expressing the relationship between man and the environment
- Country: Germany (International)
- Presented by: Leica Camera (previously World Press Photo)
- Reward: €40,000 + Leica equipment (€10,000)
- Website: http://www.leica-oskar-barnack-award.com/

The Leica Oskar Barnack Award, presented almost continuously since 1979, recognizes photography expressing the relationship between man and the environment. It was known as the Oskar Barnack Award when presented by World Press Photo between 1979 and 1992, and has been known as the Leica Oskar Barnack Award while presented by Leica Camera since 1995.

== History and purpose ==
The Oskar Barnack Award was presented by World Press Photo for the years 1979 to 1992, in the following year. (Note: For evidence of hosting by World Press Photo and for the one-year lag, see the references provided for the table of winners within this article.) It was named after Oskar Barnack (1879–1936), designer of the first Leica camera, on the hundredth anniversary of his birth.

After a short hiatus, Leica (first the Leica Group but from shortly thereafter Leica Camera) resumed the award in 1995 and has continued it to date (2021). It is now more formally titled the Leica Oskar Barnack Award.

The award is given to "professional photographers whose unerring powers of observation capture and express the relationship between man and the environment in the most graphic form in a sequence of a minimum of 10 up to a maximum of 12 images".

A "Newcomer Award", for photographers aged 25 and below, was added in 2009; a "Public Award", with submissions via i-shot-it.com, in 2014.

The selection process does not demand that jurors recuse themselves from evaluating submissions by photographers from the same agency, for such a situation is not considered to present a juror with a conflict of interest.

== Winners, World Press Photo period (1979–1992) ==
Year (Note: During the World Press Photo period, awards seem to have been identified with the year of entry submission, and conferred in the following year. Thus the Leica page that lists these ("Winner 2002–1979") describes most as for one year later, and so for example Bergkamp is described as the winner for 1980. (There appears to be a further complexity involving the award for Eugene Richards.))	Winner	Subject
1979	Floris Bergkamp	Sea battle between Greenpeace and would-be dumpers of radioactive waste
1980	Björn Larsson Ask	An 8-year-old undergoing skin transplants after serious burns
1981	Wendy Watriss	US veterans of the Vietnam war suffering from the effects of exposure to Agent Orange
1982	Neil McGahee	Two elderly brothers working as farmers
1983	Stormi Greener	The life of Hattie Vaughn, aged 106
1984	Sebastião Salgado	Famine in Ethiopia
1985	David C. Turnley	Life in South Africa
1986	Jeff Share	The Great Peace March for Global Nuclear Disarmament
1987	Chris Steele-Perkins	Lives of Thalidomide victims
1988	Charles Mason	Trapped Gray Whales in Alaska
1989	Raphaël Gaillarde	Research from a dirigible at the roof of the Amazon rainforest
1990	Barry Lewis	The effects of pollution from a lampblack factory in Copșa Mică, Romania
1991	Sebastião Salgado	Clearing up after sabotage of oilwells in Kuwait
1992	Eugene Richards	Drought in the Hadejia-Nguru wetlands

== Winners, Leica period (1995 to present) ==
Year	Winner	Title/[subject] (Note: In italics: title; [in brackets]: subject.)	Remarks
1995	Gianni Berengo Gardin	La disperata allegria	
1996	Larry Towell		
1997	Jane Evelyn Atwood		
1998	Fabio Ponzio		
1999	Claudine Doury	[minorities in Siberia]	
2000	Luc Delahaye	Winterreise [people in Russia]	
2001	Bertrand Meunier	[social tensions in the north of China, 1999–2007]	
2002	Narelle Autio	Coastal dwellers [Australians at the beach]	
2003	Andrea Hoyer	Places of memory	Honourable mentions: Jan Grarup, [refugees]; Vanessa Winship, Albanian landscape
2004	Peter Granser	Coney Island	Honourable mentions: Martin Kollar, Nothing special; Alex Majoli, Hotel Marinum
2005	Guy Tillim	Johannesburg story	Honourable mention: Linn Schröder, Are you a frog?
2006	Tomás Munita	Kabul: Leaving the shadows	Honourable mention: James Whitlow Delano, Japan Mangaland
2007	Julio Bittencourt	In a window of Prestes Maia 911 building [squatters in a building in São Paulo]	Honourable mentions: José Cendón, [psychiatric hospitals in East Africa]; Margaret M. de Lange, [the photographer's daughters]
2008	Lucia Nimcová	Unofficial [Nimcová's home town (Humenné, Slovakia)]	

In 2009, the Leica Oskar Barnack Newcomer Award was added.

Year	Award		Newcomer Award	
Year	Winner	Title/[subject]	Winner	Title/[subject]
2009	Mikhael Subotzky	Beaufort West [Beaufort West, South Africa]	Dominic Nahr	The road to nowhere [refugees in eastern DRC during the 2008 Nord-Kivu campaign]
2010	Jens Olof Lasthein	Waiting for the future: Pictures from Abkhazia	Andy Spyra	Kashmir [indigenous population of Kashmir]
2011	Jan Grarup	Haiti aftermath	Huang Jing (artist)	Pure of sight ["not dedicated to any subject in particular"]
2012	Frank Hallam Day	Alumascapes ["recreational vehicles" in Florida]	Piotr Zbierski	Pass by me [fleeting encounters with people]
2013	Evgenia Arbugaeva	Tiksi [Tiksi, Arctic Russia]	Ciril Jazbec	Waiting to move [Shishmaref, Alaska, threatened by global warming]

In 2014, the Leica Oskar Barnack Public Award was added.

Year	Award		Newcomer Award		Public Award	
Year	Winner	Title/[subject]	Winner	Title/[subject]	Winner	Title/[subject]
2014	Martin Kollar	Field trip [ambiguities in a militarized Israel]	Alejandro Cegarra	The other side of the Tower of David [squatters in a tower block in Caracas]	Tadas Cerniauskas	Comfort zone [people on the beach]
2015	JH Engström	Tout Va Bien	Wiktoria Wojciechowska	Short Flashes		
2016	Scarlett Coten	Mectoub	Clémentine Schneidermann	The Unbearable, the Sadness and the Rest		
2017	Terje Abusdal	Slash & Burn	Sergey Melnitchenko	Behind the Scenes		
2018	Max Pinckers	Red Ink	Mary Gelman	Svetlana		
2019	Mustafah Abdulaziz	Water	Nanna Heitmann	Hiding from Baba Yaga		
2020	Luca Locatelli	Future Studies	Gonçalo Fonseca	New Lisbon		
2021	Ana María Arévalo Gosen	Días Eternos	Emile Ducke	Kolyma		
2022	Kiana Hayeri	Written on the Ice	Valentin Goppel	Between the Years		
2023	Ismail Ferdous	Sea Beach	Ziyi Le	Newcomer		
2024	Davide Monteleone	Critical Minerals	Maria Guțu	Homeland		
2025	Alejandro Cegarra	The Two Walls	Serghei Duve	Bright Memory		

== See also ==
- List of environmental awards
