= Kosuke Okahara =

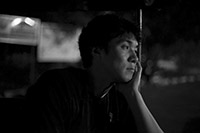
Kosuke Okahara, 2015

Kosuke Okahara (岡原功祐, Okahara Kōsuke; born February 15, 1980) is a Japanese artist based in Tokyo.

== Early life ==
He studied education at Waseda University before starting his practice as an artist. His scroll book Vanishing Existence was included in the collection of the Bayerische Staatsbibliothek (Bavarian State Library) in Munich. He is represented by Polka Galerie, Paris.

== Solo exhibitions ==
- 2026 · Slightly Elsewhere, Polka Galerie, Paris, France
- 2024 · Vanishing Existence, Musée Cernuschi, Paris, France (17 September – 8 December 2024)
- 2019 · Ibasyo, Kyotographie, Kyoto, Japan
- 2019 · Ibasyo book project, Tokyo Photographic Art Museum, Tokyo, Japan
- 2018 · Ibasyo book project, Mirage Gallery, Kobe, Japan
- 2017 · Rhapsody in the dark, Photo Festival de Saint-Brieuc, Saint-Brieuc, France
- 2016 · Fragments/Fukushima, Polka Galerie, Paris, France
- 2016 · Fragments/Fukushima, Maison de la culture du Japon, Paris, France
- 2016 · Fragments/Fukushima, Espace Kuu, Tokyo, Japan
- 2016 · Fragments/Fukushima, Mt. Rokko International Photo Festival, Kobe, Japan
- 2015 · Almost Paradise, Only Photography, Berlin, Germany
- 2015 · Fragments/Fukushima, Photo Antalya, Antalya, Turkey
- 2013 · Surviving for existence, Photo Festival de Saint-Brieuc, Saint-Brieuc, France
- 2011 · Ibasyo, Kunsthal, Rotterdam, Netherlands
- 2009 · Ibasyo, Noorderlicht, Groningen, Netherlands

== Group exhibitions ==
- 2022 · Photobooks. Art page by page, Grassi Museum, Leipzig, Germany
- 2021 · blue affair, Hong Kong International Photo Festival
- 2020 · Vertiges des jours, Polka Galerie, Paris, France
- 2019 · Magnum Live Lab, Kyotographie, Kyoto, Japan
- 2018 · Terres des Îles, Polka Galerie, Paris, France
- 2017 · SHOWCASE, Bayerische Staatsbibliothek, Munich, Germany
- 2015 · 100 years of Leica Photography, C/O Berlin, Berlin, Germany
- 2015 · Emerging, Annenberg Space for Photography, Los Angeles, USA
- 2014 · 100 years of Leica Photography, Deichtorhallen, Hamburg, Germany
- 2011 · Kosuke Okahara et Jehsong Baak, Galerie KJB, Paris, France
- 2011 · Vanishing Existence, Polka Galerie, Paris, France
- 2011 · Ibasyo, Photo Quai, Musée du quai Branly – Jacques Chirac, Paris, France
- 2010 · Ibasyo, Fotografia, Rome, Italy
- 2010 · Vanishing Existence, Gallery 21, Tokyo, Japan
- 2009 · Chance, Polka Galerie, Paris, France
- 2009 · Ibasyo, Sony World Photography Award, Aperture Gallery, New York, USA
- 2009 · Almost Paradise, Editors' Choice, Ricoh Ring Cube, Tokyo, Japan
- 2009 · Vanishing Existence, Prix Kodak de la Critique Photographique, Paris, France
- 2006 · Resistance –Darfur Conflict–, Tokyo Metropolitan Museum of Photography, Tokyo, Japan
- 2005 · Resistance –Darfur Conflict–, Kyushu University Museum, Fukuoka, Japan

== Art fairs ==
- 2025 · Paris Photo, Polka Galerie
- 2022 · Paris Photo, Polka Galerie
- 2021 · Paris Photo, Polka Galerie
- 2019 · Paris Photo, Only Photography
- 2019 · AIPAD, Only Photography
- 2018 · AIPAD, Only Photography
- 2017 · Paris Photo, Only Photography
- 2017 · AIPAD, Only Photography
- 2016 · AIPAD, Only Photography
- 2015 · Paris Photo, Only Photography
- 2010 · Tokyo Photo, Gallery 21

== Film festivals ==
- 2021 · blue affair, Official Selection, International competition, Bucharest International Experimental Film Festival
- 2021 · blue affair, Official Selection / Best Contemporary Experimental Short, Sapporo International Short Film Festival
- 2021 · blue affair, Jury's Special Mention, Short Film Competition, Las Palmas de Gran Canaria International Film Festival
- 2021 · blue affair, Official Selection, LAB Competition, Clermont-Ferrand International Short Film Festival
- 2021 · blue affair, Official Selection, New Holland Island International Debut Film Festival
- 2021 · blue affair, Official Selection, Bueu International Short Film Festival
- 2021 · blue affair, Les Nuits Photo

== Public collections ==
- Musée Cernuschi, Paris, France
- Bayerische Staatsbibliothek, Munich, Germany
- F11 Foto Museum, Hong Kong
- Museum of Dreams, London, Canada
- Kindai University, Osaka, Japan
- Kiyosato Museum of Photographic Arts, Nagano, Japan

== Artist books and monographs ==
Artist books

- Vanishing Existence, 2nd edition. THE BACKYARD, 2024.
- Vanishing Existence, Oban edition. 2016.
- Ibasyo Book Journey. Handependent, 2014. (not for sale)
- Vanishing Existence, Special edition. Backyard Project, 2013.
- Vanishing Existence. Backyard Project, 2013.

Monographs

- Ibasyo. Japan: Kousakusha, 2018. ISBN 978-4875024903
- Fukushima Fragments. France: Éditions de la Martinière, 2015. ISBN 978-2732470009
- Almost Paradise. Only Photography, Germany, 2014.
- Contact #1 –Any given day–. KOW, Japan, 2013.

== Awards and grants ==
- 2024 · Toshiaki Ogasawara Memorial Foundation Travel Grant
- 2024 · Japan Artists Association Production Grant
- 2022 · Regional Prize – Asia, Open format category, World Press Photo
- 2021 · Best Contemporary Experimental Short, 16th Sapporo International Short Film Festival
- 2021 · Jury's Special Mention, 20th Las Palmas de Gran Canaria International Film Festival
- 2017 · Saint-Brieuc Festival Grant
- 2014 · Pierre & Alexandra Boulat Award
- 2013 · Saint-Brieuc Festival Grant
- 2012 · Getty Images Grants for Editorial Photography
- 2012 · Finalist, European Publishers Award
- 2010 · Fellowship, W. Eugene Smith Memorial Fund
- 2009 · World Press Photo Joop Swart Masterclass (first Japanese selected)
- 2009 · PDN's 30 emerging photographers to watch
- 2009 · Special Mention, Prix Kodak de la Critique Photographique
- 2009 · Overseas Training Grant for Emerging Artists, Agency for Cultural Affairs, Japanese Government
- 2005 · Grand Prize, 6th Ueno Hikoma Award
