= For Most of It I Have No Words =

Photographic book by Simon Norfolk

- Author: Simon Norfolk
- Language: English
- Published: 1998
- Publisher: Dewi Lewis
- Publication place: United Kingdom
- ISBN: 978-1899235667

For Most of It I Have No Words: Genocide, Landscape, Memory is a book by British photographer Simon Norfolk published in 1998 by Dewi Lewis, with an introductory essay by Michael Ignatieff.

The book documents the human traces left behind in the aftermath of genocide. Photographs in the book were taken by Norfolk in various locations where genocides have taken place in contemporary history, including Rwanda, Cambodia, Vietnam, Germany (Auschwitz, Dresden), Ukraine, Armenia, and Namibia.

An exhibition of the same title including photographs from the book was exhibited at venues including the Imperial War Museum, London.

Images from the book are kept as photographic prints in the permanent collections at the Museum of Fine Arts, Houston, the Hyman Collection, and Portland Art Museum.
