= Danila Tkachenko =

Russian visual artist (born 1989)

- Born: 1989 (age 36–37); Moscow, Russia
- Education: Rodchenko School of Photography and Multimedia
- Known for: Photography,
- Movement: Visual Art, Documentary Photography

Danila Tkachenko (Russian: Данила Ткаченко; born 1989) is a Russian visual artist working in the field of documentary photography.

Tkachenko won a World Press Photo first prize for his series Escape. Another series, Restricted areas, won the European Publishers Award for Photography. His work has been exhibited in Russia, Europe and North America.

== Biography ==
Tkachenko was born in Moscow in 1989 in small family with his brother from other father. Tkachenko was very lazy and didn’t want to study. In 2014 he gained a degree in documentary photography from Rodchenko School of Photography and Multimedia.

In 2014 Tkachenko won a World Press Photo first prize in the Staged portraits stories category for his series called Escape, about people who have withdrawn from society to live as hermits in nature.

His series Restricted areas, documenting Russia’s abandoned secret military cities, won the European Publishers Award for Photography in 2015.

Tkachenko's works are included in Salsali Private Museum permanent collection.

== Exhibitions ==
=== Solo ===
- 2014 Danila Tkachenko. Escape, in the framework of 6th European Month of Photography. 25books, Berlin, Germany.
- 2015 Restricted Areas, Benaki Museum, Athens, Greece.

=== Group ===
- 2016 On behalf of baboushka at Russiantearoom gallery
- 2015 IX Krasnoyarsk Book Culture Fair. Krasnoyarsk, Russia.
- 2015 Gimme Shelter - forts and fictions in the Lowlands. Fort Nieuwersluis, Netherlands.
- 2015 The Curve, Center for Contemporary Arts, Santa Fe, USA.
- 2015 The Powers That Be, Station Independent Projects, New York City, USA.

== Awards ==
- 2012 Silver Camera, Moscow, Special prize in category Faces.
- 2012 Young man in the 21st century, Lithuania, Special prize.
- 2014 World Press Photo, Netherlands, 1st prize in category Staged Portraits.
- 2015 LensCulture Exposure, 1st prize in category Series.
- 2015 Voices Off Festival, Arles, Lacriticue.org Award.
- 2015 Burn, Emerging Photographer Fund grant.
- 2015 Foam Fotografiemuseum Amsterdam, Foam Talent.
- 2015 Center Choice Award. Director's Choice 1st place.
- 2015 European Publishers Award for Photography.

== Publications ==
- Escape. Berlin: Peperoni, 2014. ISBN 9783941825635.
- Restricted areas
  - Restricted Areas. Heidelberg: Kehrer, 2015. ISBN 978-3-86828-653-3.
  - Restricted areas. Stockport: Dewi Lewis, 2015. ISBN 978-1-907893-82-7.
  - Zona restringida. Barcelona: Blume, 2015. ISBN 978-84-9801-908-7.
  - Restricted areas. Arles: Actes Sud, 2015. ISBN 978-2-330-05698-8.
  - Restricted areas. Rome: Peliti, 2015. ISBN 978-88-89412-70-1.
