= Nanna Heitmann =

German documentary photographer (born 1994)

Nanna Heitmann (born 1994) is a German documentary photographer. She joined Magnum Photos as a nominee in 2019. As of 2020 Heitmann was living in Moscow.

== Early life and education ==
Heitmann was born in Ulm, Germany and grew up in Germany. She studied photojournalism and documentary photography at the University of Hanover.

== Life and work ==
Heitmann joined Magnum Photos as a nominee in 2019.

For the series Hiding from Baba Yaga, Heitmann traced the southern regions of the Yenisey river, which runs from Mongolia, through all of Siberia, and into the Arctic Ocean. Along its route she photographed individuals and communities living in some of the coldest territories in Russia. The series Weg vom Fenster (Gone From the Window) is about the workers at Germany's last operating coal mine, Bergwerk Prosper-Haniel.

Heitmann's personal work has been published by National Geographic, Time, Le Monde, de Volkskrant, and Stern magazine. She has worked on assignments for The New York Times, Time, The Washington Post, Stern magazine, and The Seattle Times.

== Personal life ==
As of 2020 she was living in Moscow.

== Publications ==
- Foto Kunst Malerei: Fotografien von Heinrich Strieffler und Nanna Heitmann. Landau, Germany: Knecht, 2019. ISBN 978-3939427513.

== Awards ==
- 2019: Winner, Newcomer Award, Leica Oskar Barnack Award, for her series Hiding From Baba Yaga
- 2019: Sunday Times Award for Achievement, the Ian Parry Scholarship, for her series Hiding From Baba Yaga
- 2020: Finalist (1 of 9), W. Eugene Smith Memorial Fund, for "Russia's Pandemic of Inequality"
- 2022: World Press Photo, Europe, Stories for "As Frozen Lands Burn"
- 2024: Finalist, Pulitzer Prize for Feature Photography

== Exhibitions ==
=== Solo exhibitions ===
- Nanna Heitman, Leica Gallery, Zingst, 2020

=== Group exhibitions ===
- Essere Umane – Le grandi fotografe raccontano il mondo, Museo San Domenico di Forlì, Italy, 2021/22
- Close Enough: New Perspectives from 12 Women Photographers of Magnum, International Center of Photography, New York, September 2022 – January 2023
