= Lucia Nimcová =

Slovak photographer (born 1977)

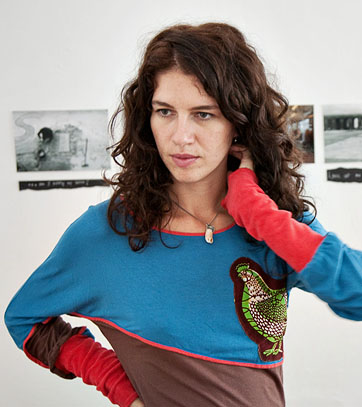
- Nimcová in 2009
- Born: 11 November 1977 (age 48); Humenné, Czechoslovakia
- Education: Opava School of Photography; Rijksakademie van beeldende kunsten
- Occupation: Photographer
- Spouse: Roman Babják
- Children: 2
- Awards: Leica Oskar Barnack Award (2008); ECB Annual Photography Award (2008)
- Website: luco.sk

Lucia Nimcová (born 11 November 1977) is a Slovak photographer.

== Biography ==
=== Early life and education ===
Lucia Nimcová was born on 11 November 1977 in Humenné. She is of Ruthenian descent. She started photographing at the age of nine. Nimcová was educated at the School of creative industry in Košice and studied creative photography at the Opava School of Photography and at the State Academy of Fine Arts in Amsterdam.

=== Photography ===
In 2003, she Nimcová published a Slovensko 2003 series funded by the Institute for Public Affairs, mapping the life after the fall of communistm. She further developed this topic in her 2008 Unofficial series, which was awarded the Leica Oskar Barnack Award. The series was also awarded the European Central Bank Photography Award for the best contribution on the theme "Europe".

In 2020s, Nimcová conducted extensive fieldwork in the Carpathians on the border between Slovakia, Poland and Ukraine, recording the sung and spoken testimonies of local women to preserve disappearing oral histories, especially those reflecting female experiences and trauma across generations.

== Personal life ==
Nimcová resides in Addis Ababa. Nimcová and husband, the producer Roman Babják, have two children.
