= Simon Norfolk =

Nigerian-British photographer

- Born: 24 January 1963 (age 63); Lagos, Nigeria
- Known for: Photography
- Website: Official website

Simon Norfolk (born 24 January 1963) is a Nigerian-born British architectural and landscape photographer. He has produced four photo book monographs of his work. He lives and works in Brighton & Hove. He also lived in Kabul. His work is featured regularly in the National Geographic, the New York Times Magazine and The Guardian Weekend.

Norfolk has won the Prix Dialogue de l'Humanite award at Rencontres d'Arles, in 2005, multiple World Press Photo and Sony World Photography Awards, the Foreign Press Club of America Award, European Publishers Award for Photography and an Infinity Prize from the International Center of Photography, in 2004. In 2003 he was shortlisted for the Citibank Prize (now known as the Deutsche Börse Photography Prize), and in 2013 he won the Prix Pictet Commission. His works have been collected in museums like the Museum of Fine Arts, Houston and Tate Modern, London.

== Early life and education ==
Norfolk was born in Lagos, Nigeria but was raised in England. Norfolk studied documentary photography at Newport College of Art. He also studied at University of Bristol and Hertford College, in Oxford, earning a degree in Philosophy and Sociology.

== Life and work ==
He is considered a landscape photographer, who has dedicated himself to document some of the most serious contemporary war zones and refugee crisis, often depicting the aftermath of the conflicts and its results on land and people. The website Widewalls states that "Without the subjectiveness of most photojournalism, these landscapes allow the viewer to draw their own conclusion on the effects war."

He has published four photographic books, being the first, For Most of It I Have No Words: Genocide, Landscape, Memory (1998), about the aftermath of several contemporary genocides in countries like Rwanda, Cambodia, Vietnam, Germany, Ukraine, Armenia, and Namibia. Norfolk second book, Afghanistan: Chronotopia (2002), is about the conflict on Afghanistan, and Bleed (2005), was dedicated to the aftermath of the Bosnian War (1992–1995). He took aim to historical photography with his book Burke + Norfolk (2001), dedicated to the work of the Irish photographer John Burke during the Second Anglo-Afghan War, in the 1880s, and his own work inspired by it and related to the contemporary war in the same country. This book was the subject of an exhibition that took place in Tate Modern, in London, with Norfolk being one of the few photographers ever to be given a solo exhibition in that museum.

== Awards ==
- 2001: World Press Photo
- 2002: European Publishers Award for Photography
- 2003: Citibank Prize, shortlisted
- 2003: Overseas Press Club of America, Olivier Rebbot Award
- 2004: Infinity Prize, International Center of Photography
- 2005: Prix Dialogue de l'Humanite award, Rencontres d'Arles
- 2012: World Press Photo, Portraits, 3rd prize
- 2012: Sony World Photography Awards, Professional Competition, People, 1st place
- 2012: Association of Photographers, Gold Award, Non-commissioned Project
- 2013: Prix Pictet Commission
- 2015: Sony World Photography Awards, Professional Competition, Landscape, 1st place
- 2015: LensCulture Earth Awards, Series Winner, Fine Art / Conceptual
- 2016: British Archaeological Awards, Best Public Presentation (for "Under London," National Geographic Magazine)
- 2020 Shifting Foundation Grant

== Exhibitions ==
=== Solo exhibitions ===
- For most of it I have no words, Side Gallery, Newcastle, June–August 1999

=== Group exhibitions ===
- Afghanistan: Chronotopia, part of The Citibank Prize, The Photographers' Gallery, London, 2003.
- Prix Pictet Commission photographs, Somerset House, London, 10–27 October 2013. With Munem Wasif, Ed Kashi, and Chris Jordan.
- AOP50: Images that Defined the Age.

== Publications ==
- For Most of It I Have No Words: Genocide, Landscape, Memory. Stockport: Dewi Lewis, 1998. ISBN 978-1899235667.
- Afghanistan. Stockport: Dewi Lewis, 2002. ISBN 978-1899235544.
- Afghanistan: Chronotopia.
  - Stockport: Dewi Lewis, 2002. ISBN 978-2742740512.
  - Stockport: Dewi Lewis, 2005.
- Bleed. Stockport: Dewi Lewis, 2005. ISBN 978-1904587194.
- Full Spectrum Dominance. Self-published, 2009. Edition of 95 copies.
- Burke + Norfolk: Photographs from the War in Afghanistan by John Burke and Simon Norfolk. Stockport: Dewi Lewis, 2011. ISBN 978-1907893117. Photographs by Norfolk and John Burke.

== Public collections ==
Norfolk's work is held in the following public collections:

- Amon Carter Museum of American Art, Fort Worth, Texas
- Cleveland Museum of Art
- George Eastman Museum, Rochester
- Henry Art Gallery, University of Washington, Seattle
- Hyman Collection, London
- International Center of Photography (ICP)
- Los Angeles County Museum of Art
- Metropolitan Museum of Art, New York
- Milwaukee Art Museum
- Museum of Fine Arts, Houston
- National Media Museum, Bradford
- Nelson-Atkins Museum of Art, Kansas City
- Portland Art Museum
- San Francisco Museum of Modern Art
- Saint Louis Art Museum, Missouri
- Tate Modern, London
- Wolverhampton Art Gallery
