= Fabio Ponzio =

Italian documentary photographer

- Born: September 11, 1959 (age 65); Milan, Italy
- Occupation: Documentary photographer
- Website: www.fabioponzio.com

Fabio Ponzio (born September 11, 1959) is an Italian documentary photographer, winner of the "Leica Oskar Barnack Award" 1998.

== Biography ==
Ponzio was born in Milan in 1959. His interest in photography began in 1976, during a trip to the Balkans. He worked for the Italian and international press from 1980 to 1987.

In December 1987, Ponzio embarked on a photographic odyssey around remote parts of Central and Eastern Europe. He photographed Poland, Czechoslovakia, Germany, Hungary, Ukraine, Russia, Romania, Bulgaria, Turkey, Yugoslavia and Albania, traveling by car with a tent, a stove, a sleeping bag, a Leica camera, three Nikon cameras and 100 rolls of film.

In 1989 Ponzio was in Central and Eastern Europe to document the fall of the communist regimes. On June 28, 1989, he was in Kosovo to listen to Slobodan Milošević give the famous Gazimestan speech, which laid out the ideology and programme that would lead to the tragedies of the Yugoslav wars. Following 1989, Ponzio documented "the transition from communism to the consumer free-for-all that followed the first flush of freedom."

In 2003 he travelled to Georgia with a friend, the writer Rocco Carbone. Thus began a series of trips to the southern Caucasus and Armenia.

In 2007 he was commissioned by MAXXI (Museo Nazionale delle Arti del XXI secolo) in Rome to document the Italian landscape. This project gave rise to a series of travels in Western Europe in 2008, in search of the identity of another Europe.

In 2020, East of Nowhere, a synthesis of twenty-two years of work, was published by Thames & Hudson in the UK and the United States. It was shortlisted for the Aperture's 2020 photobook awards. In 2021, a French-language edition was published by Actes Sud.

== Publications ==
- East of Nowhere. London: Thames & Hudson, 2020. ISBN 9780500545201. With an introduction by Ponzio and a preface by Herta Müller. (Note: Page about East of Nowhere, Thames & Hudson.)
- A l'est de nulle part. Arles: Actes Sud, 2021. ISBN 978-2-330-13311-5. (Note: Page about A l'est de nulle part, Actes Sud.)

== Awards ==
- 1991 – European Kodak Award of Photography, Arles (France)
- 1993 – Mother Jones International Fund for Documentary Photography, San Francisco (CA, United States)
- 1998 – Leica Oskar Barnack Award, Arles (France)
