= Acacia Johnson =

American photographer and explorer

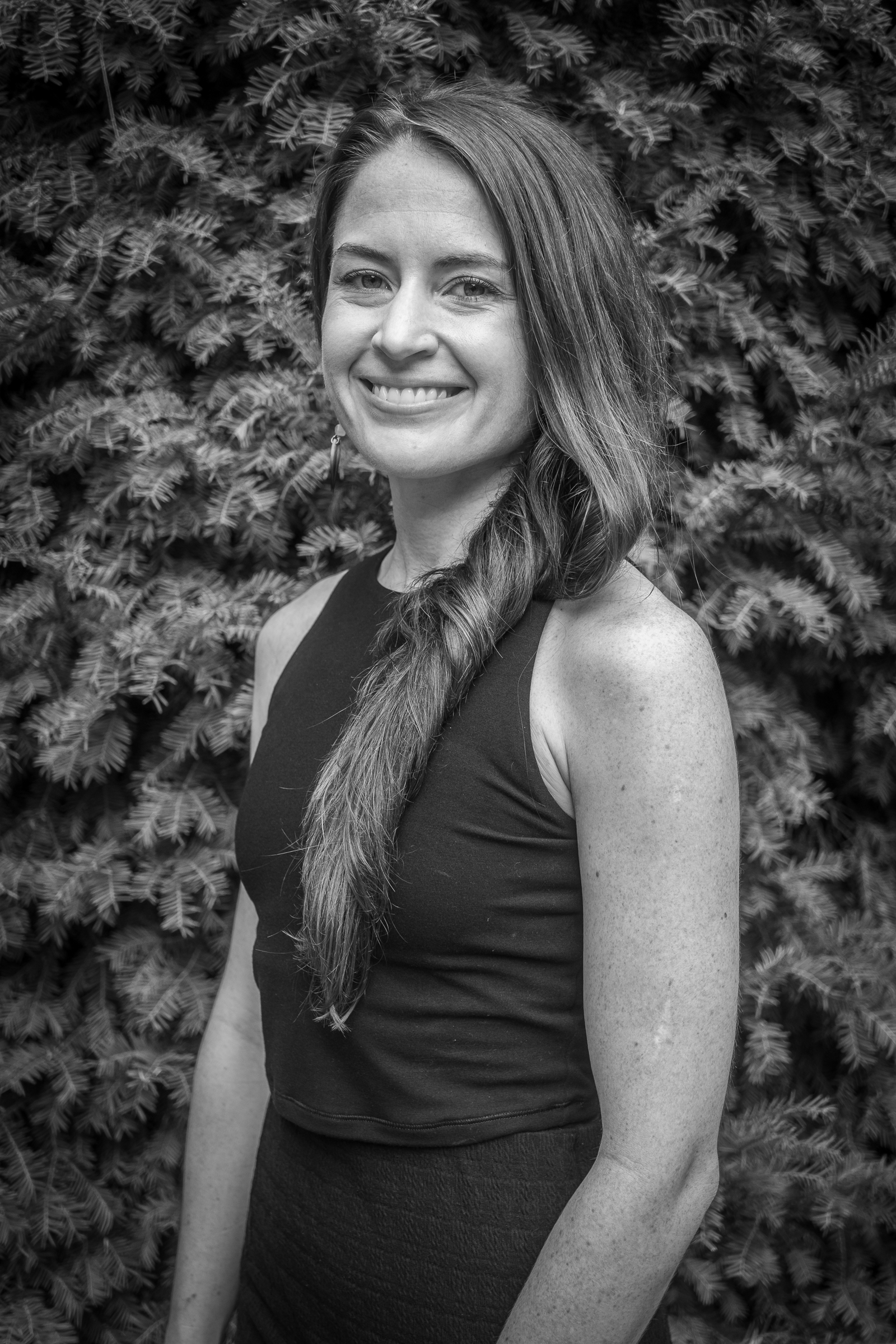
- Johnson in 2022
- Born: 1990 (age 35–36); Anchorage, Alaska, United States

Acacia Johnson (born 1990) is an American photographer from Alaska who since 2014 has focused on the polar regions. She has made over fifty expeditions to Greenland, the Norwegian island of Svalbard, the Canadian Arctic and Antarctica, lecturing on photography and indigenous peoples. Johnson has contributed to National Geographic, most recently in a feature on Baffin Island (September 2019). Her work forms part of the permanent collections of the Smithsonian and the Anchorage Museum.

== Biography ==
Born in Anchorage, Alaska in 1990, during her childhood she was keen on following wildlife including grizzly bears. In 2008, she was an exchange student at Narvik Upper Secondary School in Narvik, Norway. The year she spent there encouraged her to embark on a career as a photographer, thanks to a course on media and communications and the magic light she discovered in the polar circle. After spending a few years in Norway, she studied photography at the Rhode Island School of Design.

As a result of successfully focusing on photography in the polar regions, she was granted a Fulbright Scholarship. It brought her to Baffin Island in the Canadian Arctic where she was able to study the local population in an Inuit village.

Johnson explains that she is not the first one in her family to be interested in photography: "Both my grandfather and my father took pictures all the time. I got my first camera when I was nine. I have always been artistic but I think the reason I chose photography was because it is not only a form of artistic expression, it also offers a means of engaging with the world".

Since October 2019, Acacia Johnson has been based in Charlottesville, Virginia, where she is following a course in creative writing at the University of Virginia. She intends to develop her photographic and writing skills in either fiction or in photo books with descriptive essays.
