= Jess T. Dugan =

American photographer and educator

Jess T. Dugan (born 1986) is an American portrait photographer and educator, living in St. Louis, Missouri. They are currently the 2020–2021 Henry L. and Natalie E. Freund Teaching Fellow at the Sam Fox School of Design & Visual Arts, Washington University in St. Louis.

Their long-term projects, Every Breath We Drew and To Survive On This Shore: Photographs and Interviews with Transgender and Gender Nonconforming Older Adults (with Vanessa Fabbre), have been published as books and toured the US as exhibitions, including at Minneapolis Institute of Art and George Eastman Museum (where it is currently on show). They received a Champion of Change Award from the White House in 2015 and the 2019 Infinity Award for Emerging Photographer from the International Center of Photography. Their work is held in the collection of the Museum of Contemporary Photography, Chicago.

== Early life and education ==
Dugan was born in Biloxi, Mississippi. They received a BFA in Photography from the Massachusetts College of Art and Design (2007); a Master of Liberal Arts in Museum Studies from Harvard University (2010); and a MFA in Photography from Columbia College Chicago (2014).

== Photography career ==
Dugan's notable long-term bodies of work include Every Breath We Drew; To Survive on this Shore; and Pictures with My Mother.

Of Every Breath We Drew, begun in 2011, Dugan has said "The people I was drawn to photograph embody a gentle kind of a masculinity, whether they are male or female, gay or straight." "Dugan invites the viewer to reflect on her vision of the masculine identity" while the work "also questions the collective idea of gender and sexuality—specifically what it means to be a man." It was published as a book in 2015 and has been exhibited in a number of locations in the US.

To Survive on this Shore: Photographs and Interviews with Transgender and Gender Nonconforming Older Adults, made between 2013 and 2018, contains portraits by Dugan and interviews with each person predominantly by Vanessa Fabbre, and some by Dugan. The subjects are a group of more than 60 people over the age of 50 from various ethnicities, US states and socio-economic backgrounds.

Dugan and Fabbre's goals for To Survive on this Shore include highlighting an overlooked and under-represented group of people—older transgender and gender nonconforming people—for younger trans people; showing trans people as "everyday people and how they're living their lives" rather than part of "a celebrity culture or a Hollywood representation"; and recording the history of trans activists.

To Survive on this Shore was published as a book in 2018 and toured as an exhibition around the US. The title is taken from the Ani DiFranco song "Talk to Me Now".

They always make portraits while alone with the subject and using natural light.

Dugan was the 2020–2021 Henry L. and Natalie E. Freund Teaching Fellow at the Sam Fox School of Design & Visual Arts, Washington University in St. Louis.

Among Dugan's long-term projects is Family Pictures (2012-), a series which includes photographs of their partner, daughter, mother and her partner. A portion of the series was included in the National Portrait Gallery's exhibition Kinship (2022-2023) in Washington, D.C.

== Personal life ==
Dugan is queer and non-binary gender. They came out as gay at age 13, began questioning their gender identity when they were 14 or 15, and now describe themselves as "loosely part of the transgender umbrella". They have had chest reconstruction surgery. As of 2019 Dugan was said to use she/her pronouns but as of late 2020 they were said to use the singular pronoun they, as used by their own website in early 2021.

Their partner is Vanessa Fabbre, a social worker and assistant professor at the Brown School of Social Work at Washington University in St. Louis.

== Publications ==
=== Publications by Dugan ===
- A Moment Collected: Photographs at the Harvard Art Museum. Self-published, 2011. ISBN 978-0984634613. Monograph.
- Transcendence. Winchester, MA: Griffin Museum of Photography, 2012. With an introduction by Dawoud Bey and an interview with Anthony Scibilia.
- Pretty Boys Looking at Me. 2013. Edition of 100 copies. Monograph.
- Every Breath We Drew. 2012. With an essay by David Travis. Exhibition catalog.
- Every Breath We Drew. Hillsborough, NC: Daylight, 2015. ISBN 9781942084044. With an essay by Amy Galpin and an interview with Dawoud Bey. Monograph.
- Look at me like you love me. London: Mack, 2022. ISBN 978-1-913620-54-7.
- Jess T. Dugan & Charlotte Cotton: Love Pictures, Santa Fe: Radius Books, 2026, ISBN 9798890181299.

=== Publications with Fabbre ===
- To Survive on this Shore: Photographs and Interviews with Transgender and Gender Nonconforming Older Adults. Heidelberg, Germany: Kehrer, 2018; 2019. With Vanessa Fabbre. ISBN 978-3-86828-854-4. With an interview by Karen Irvine. Monograph.

== Films ==
- Letter to my Father (2017) – video, 14 m 54 s

== Awards ==
- 2015: Champion of Change Award, the White House, Washington, D.C.
- 2018: Women Photograph Grant, from Women Photograph and Getty Images. A $5000 award.
- 2019: Infinity Award: Emerging Photographer, International Center of Photography, New York

== Collections ==
Dugan's work is held in the following permanent collections:

- Library of Congress, Washington, D.C.: archived website
- Light Work, Syracuse, New York: 3 prints and To Survive On This Shore portfolio (as of March 2021)
- Mary and Leigh Block Museum of Art, Northwestern University, Evanston, Illinois: To Survive On This Shore portfolio (as of March 2021)
- Museum of Contemporary Photography, Chicago

== Exhibitions ==
=== Solo exhibitions ===
- Every Breath We Drew, Cornell Fine Arts Museum, Rollins College, Winter Park, Florida, 2015; Grunwald Gallery of Art, Indiana University Bloomington, Bloomington, Indiana, 2019; Montserrat College of Art, Beverly, Massachusetts, 2019; Truman State University, Kirksville, Missouri, 2020
- Jess T. Dugan: Coupled, Museum of Fine Arts, Boston, 2022

=== Exhibitions with Fabbre ===
- To Survive on This Shore, Center on Halsted (Museum of Contemporary Photography satellite exhibition), Chicago, Illinois, 2017; David M. Rubenstein Rare Book & Manuscript Library Photography Gallery, Duke University, Durham, North Carolina, 2019; University of New Mexico Art Museum, University of New Mexico, Albuquerque, 2019; Gregory Allicar Museum of Art at Colorado State University, Fort Collins, Colorado, 2019; Frost Art Museum, Florida International University, Miami, Florida; Provincetown Art Association and Museum, Provincetown, Massachusetts, 2019; George Eastman Museum, Rochester, New York, 2021/22
- Vision 2020: Jess T. Dugan, Minneapolis Institute of Art, Minneapolis, Minnesota, 2020. Eight photographs from To Survive on This Shore, with text by Fabbre.
