= Kristina Budelis =

American filmmaker and entrepreneur

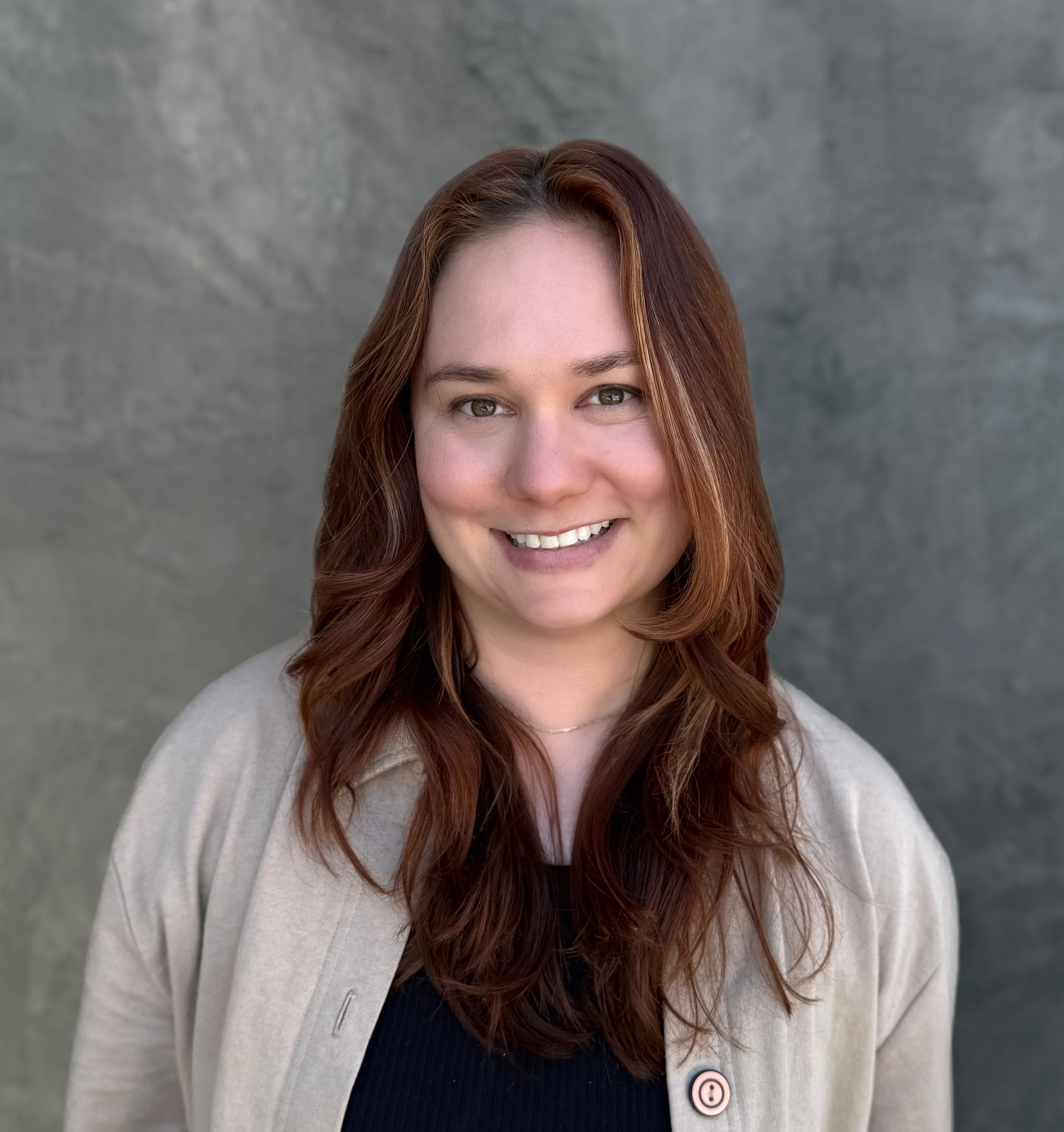
- Education: Barnard College of Columbia University; New York University Tisch School of the Arts (ITP)
- Occupations: Filmmaker, entrepreneur
- Known for: Co-founding KitSplit; short documentary Tall Tales with True Queens
- Website: https://www.kristinabudelis.com/

Kristina Budelis is an American filmmaker and entrepreneur. She is a co-founder of the camera-equipment rental marketplace KitSplit and a film director and executive producer whose work includes the short Tall Tales with True Queens and episodes of the PBS/NATURE digital series Untold Earth.

== Early life and education ==
Budelis studied English and film at Barnard College of Columbia University. She later attended the Interactive Telecommunications Program (ITP) at New York University's Tisch School of the Arts.

== Career ==
=== The New Yorker ===
Budelis worked as a producer in The New Yorker's video department, making short documentaries and multimedia pieces that were published on newyorker.com. While at NYU ITP, she worked on a "DroneBooth" project noted in reporting about so-called "dronies".

=== KitSplit ===
In 2015, Budelis co-founded KitSplit, described by technology and trade outlets as an "Airbnb of cameras". In 2017, KitSplit acquired CameraLends. In 2018, KitSplit launched a free mentorship and coaching program connecting women in film and video with industry professionals for one-on-one sessions.

=== Film work ===
Budelis co-directed and produced the short documentary Tall Tales with True Queens, an official selection of the Tribeca Film Festival (2020) and the Meet the Press Film Festival at AFI Fest (2020). It was also included in the Hot Springs Documentary Film Festival program. The film received additional coverage from Condé Nast's Them and other outlets. She directed and produced an episode of the PBS/NATURE and Atlas Obscura series Untold Earth, titled "It Looks Like a Desert. But It Has Thousands of Lakes" (Season 2), which as of Nov 3rd was the most popular episode in the series on Youtube, having been viewed over 1.5 million times in under one week and over 5.5 million times overall.

Budelis also co-directed Cat-astrophe (2021), published by The New Yorker.

=== Writing and speaking ===
Budelis has written pieces for The New Yorker, including "Barthes’s Hand" (Page-Turner, 2010), "On and Off the Walls: Suburban Knights" (Photo Booth, 2010), and "Off the Shelf: Flying Pictures" (Photo Booth, 2010).

Budelis writes Film Robots, a newsletter about AI and film; in 2024, No Film School published her article "Game-Changers and Missteps in AI in Documentary Film".

She has spoken and taught about artificial intelligence, filmmaking, and creative technology through Sundance Collab, including the session "AI for Documentary Filmmakers: Research, Transcripts, and Trust" with Erica Elson.

She was also interviewed by Marketplace about creator tools and equipment sharing, and quoted by New York Magazine'sThe Cut on entrepreneurship and co-founding KitSplit.

== Recognition ==
In 2015, Budelis was selected for the inaugural ONA–Poynter Leadership Academy for Women in Digital Media. In 2017, she was named to Forbes's 30 Under 30 list in the Media category. She is also credited among recipients in the 70th Pictures of the Year International competition.

== Selected filmography ==
- Tall Tales with True Queens (2020) – co-director/producer
- Cat-astrophe (2021) – co-director
- Untold Earth — "This Bay Moves 100 Billion Tons of Water Every Day" (2025, Season 2, Ep. 7) – executive producer
- Untold Earth — "It Looks Like a Desert. But It Has Thousands of Lakes" (Season 2, 2025) – director, producer, writer
