= Asian Contemporary Art Fair =

Art fair held in New York City, U.S.

The Asian Contemporary Art Fair was a contemporary art fair held annually in New York City. The first fair took place November 8–12, 2007. The second Asian Contemporary Art Fair occurred November 6–10, 2008.

The Asian Contemporary Art Fair (ACAF) was hosted by AsianArtWorks, a Korean company with offices in Beijing, Seoul and New York. The fair's primary sponsor was the Korean engineering company HNC.

== Asian Contemporary Art Fair 2007 ==
ACAF 2007 was the first art fair dedicated to Asian contemporary art to be held in New York City. It included 81 exhibitors from China, England, France, Germany, Hong Kong, India, Indonesia, Japan, Korea, Switzerland, Taiwan, Vietnam and the United States. The fair was held at New York's Pier 92 at 52nd Street and 12th Avenue.

The opening night preview reception was on November 8 with a performance by Korean-born dancer Sin Cha Hong.

As well as the exhibiting galleries, the fair's program included panel discussions, such as Robert Storr in dialogue with Xu Bing, and a special exhibition, “Simulasian: Refiguring ‘Asia’ for the 21st Century,” curated by Eric C. Shiner and Lilly Wei. Performances by artists Frank Fu, Cai Qing, and Qiu Zhijie and the Long March Project were also held throughout the fair's duration.

Participating Galleries 2007:

- 1918 ArtSPACE, Shanghai
- 2x13 Gallery, New York
- 798 Avant Gallery, New York
- AHL Foundation, New York
- Aicon Gallery, New York/Palo Alto/London
- Alexander Ochs Galleries, Berlin/Beijing
- Amelia Johnson Contemporary, Hong Kong
- Arario Gallery, Cheonan, Beijing/Seoul/New York
- Art Vietnam Gallery, Hanoi
- ATM Gallery, New York
- Aura Gallery, Hong Kong/Shanghai
- Author Gallery, Shanghai
- Base Gallery, Tokyo
- Beatrice Chang Contemporary Art, Inc., New York
- Cais Gallery, Seoul
- Cheryl McGinnis Gallery, New York
- ChinaSquare, New York
- Chosun Art Gallery, Seoul
- Ego Gallery, Jakarta
- Ethan Cohen Fine Arts, New York
- Frederieke Taylor Gallery, New York
- Galerie Bhak, Seoul
- Galerie Caprice Horn, Berlin
- Galerie 89 Eyety Nine, Paris
- Galerie Kashya Hildebrand, Zurich
- Galerie Teo, Tokyo
- Gallery Artlink, Seoul
- Gallery Artside, Beijing/Seoul
- Gallery Espace, New Delhi
- Gallery Hirota Bijutsu, Tokyo
- Gallery Ihn, Seoul
- Gallery Kong, Seoul
- Gallery Q, Tokyo
- Gallery Terra Tokyo, Tokyo
- Gallery Touch Art, Paju
- Gallery Tsubaki, Tokyo
- Gallery Yamaguchi, Tokyo
- Gallery Yeh, Seoul
- Gana Art Gallery, Seoul
- Goedhuis Contemporary, London/Beijing/New York
- Hakgojae Gallery, Seoul
- Hino Gallery, Tokyo
- HNC Culture, Beijing/Seoul
- Hosane, Shanghai
- Interart Channel, Seoul/New York
- Iroom Gallery, Paju
- Jean Art Gallery, Seoul
- Jeff Cain Collection, Los Angeles
- Kimjaesun Gallery, Busan
- Kimyoungseob Photo Gallery, Seoul
- Krampf Gallery, New York
- Kukje Gallery, Seoul
- Leehwaik Gallery, Seoul
- Lillian Heidenberg Fine Art, New York
- Mem, Osaka
- Moca China, Hong Kong
- Nichido Contemporary Art, Tokyo
- Nodo Contemporary, Nagoya
- Olyvia Oriental, London
- One and J. Gallery, Seoul
- Parkryusook Gallery, Seoul
- Ping's Gallery, Tapei
- PYO Gallery, Seoul
- Red Gate Gallery, Beijing
- Rho Gallery, Seoul
- Sanshang Art, Hangzhou
- Seomi & Tuus Gallery, Seoul
- SHiNE Art Space, Shanghai
- Sotheby's, New York
- Sundaram Tagore Gallery, New York/Beverly Hills
- Susan Eley Fine Art, New York
- Taguchi Fine Art, Ltd., Tokyo
- Taipei Cultural Center, New York
- Tenri Cultural Institute, New York
- The Newgate East, Seoul
- The Tolman Collection of Tokyo, Tokyo/New York/Shanghai
- Today Art Museum, Beijing
- Tokyo Gallery + Btap, Tokay/Beijing
- Vadehra Art Gallery, New Delhi
- Wellside Gallery, Seoul/Shanghai
- Zendai MoMA, Shanghai

== Asian Contemporary Art Fair 2008 ==
The second ACAF was held from November 6–10, 2008, at Pier 92. It had 62 exhibitors from Australia, Bangladesh, China, England, France, Hong Kong, India, Indonesia, Japan, Korea, Philippines, Singapore, Spain, Switzerland, Taiwan, Vietnam and the United States.

An opening night reception was held on November 6. It included a fashion show by Angel Chang and performance artwork by Yibin Tian.

The fair commissioned two special exhibitions, one from Central Asia and the Middle East, and one from China. “Given Difference,” curated by Charles Merewether, examined art from Kazakhstan, Turkey, and Georgia. “My Bone, Flesh and Skin,” curated by Feng Boyi, brought together the work of five young contemporary Chinese artists who used the body as a subject for exploring contemporary states of existence.

Participating Galleries 2008:

- 2x13 Gallery, Seoul
- 798 Avant Gallery, New York
- A Thousand Plateau Art Space, Chengdu
- Aibo Fine Asian Art, Purchase
- Art for All Society, Macau
- Art Seasons, Beijing
- Art Vietnam, Hanoi
- Artside, Seoul/Beijing
- Base Gallery, Tokyo
- Bengal Gallery of Fine Art, Dhaka
- CCA Gallery, New York
- China Blue, Beijing
- China Previews Gallery, New York
- Chinese Contemporary, New York/Beijing/London
- East Asia Contemporary, Shanghai
- Eli Klien Fine Art, New York
- Exhibit A, New York
- Feizi Gallery, Shanghai
- Frederieke Taylor Gallery, New York
- Galeria Bellarte, Seoul
- Galeria Dolores de Sierra, Madrid
- Galerie Hussenot, Paris
- Galerie Lansar, Switzerland
- Gallery 456 – Chinese American Arts Council, New York
- Gallery Beyond, Mumbai
- Gallery Terra, Tokyo
- Iberia Center for Contemporary Art, Beijing
- IFA, Shanghai
- InfraRed Art Projects, Hong Kong/Paris
- Ippodo Gallery, Tokyo/New York
- Jamaica Center for Arts & Learning, New York
- Jean Art Gallery, Seoul
- Johyun Gallery, Seoul/Busan
- Leila Taghinia-Milani Heller Gallery, New York
- Lillian Heidenberg Fine Art, New York
- Linda Gallery, Jakarta/Singapore/Beijing/Shanghai
- Magee Gallery, Beijing/Madrid
- Max Protetch, New York
- Paris-Beijing Photo Gallery, Beijing
- PYO Gallery, Seoul/Beijing/Los Angeles
- Red Gate, Beijing
- Redlips Studio Gallery, Sydney
- Regis Krampf, New York
- Shanghai Zendai Museum of Modern Art, Shanghai
- Sheng Ling Gallery, Shanghai
- Shiseido HATANAKA, Tokyo
- Silverlens Gallery, Manila
- Sohn Wook Gallery, Gyeongju
- Studio Rouge, Shanghai
- Sundaram Tagore, New York
- T Space, Beijing
- Taipei Cultural Center, New York
- THE Gallery, New York
- Tibetan Bridge, New York
- Today Art Museum, Beijing
- Tolman Collection, New York
- TS1, Beijing
- UCCA, Beijing
- Vietnamese Contemporary Fine Art, New York
- White Box, New York
- Xerxes Fine Art, London
- Yamashita Gallery, Tokyo

== Attendance and Reception ==
In 2007 approximately 25,000 people attended ACAF. Sales were reported as "steady". The fair received mostly positive reviews from a critical standpoint. Ken Johnson wrote of ACAF 2007 in The New York Times, “Fizzy and entertaining on the surface, it has a disquieting underside.”

In 2008, attendance at ACAF was estimated at 30,000 visitors. The effects of the 2008 financial crisis on the art market dominated the fair's media coverage.

AsianArtWorks moved its main office to Beijing, China in 2009.
