= Sina Najafi =

American magazine editor

Sina Najafi is an American cultural journalist. He is the founder and editor-in-chief of New York-based Cabinet Magazine. Najafi has also curated a number of art-related exhibitions, including “Philosophical Toys” (2005), “Odd Lots: Revisiting Gordon Matta-Clark’s Fake Estates” (2005–6), and “The Paper Sculpture Show” (2003).

== Education ==
Najafi obtained his B.A. degree in Comparative Literature from Princeton University in 1987, and also received advanced degrees from Columbia University and New York University.

== Career ==
Najafi is the editor-in-chief at Cabinet Magazine and co-director of Immaterial Incorporated. He has taught courses at Cooper Union, Yale, and RISD.
