= List of photography awards =

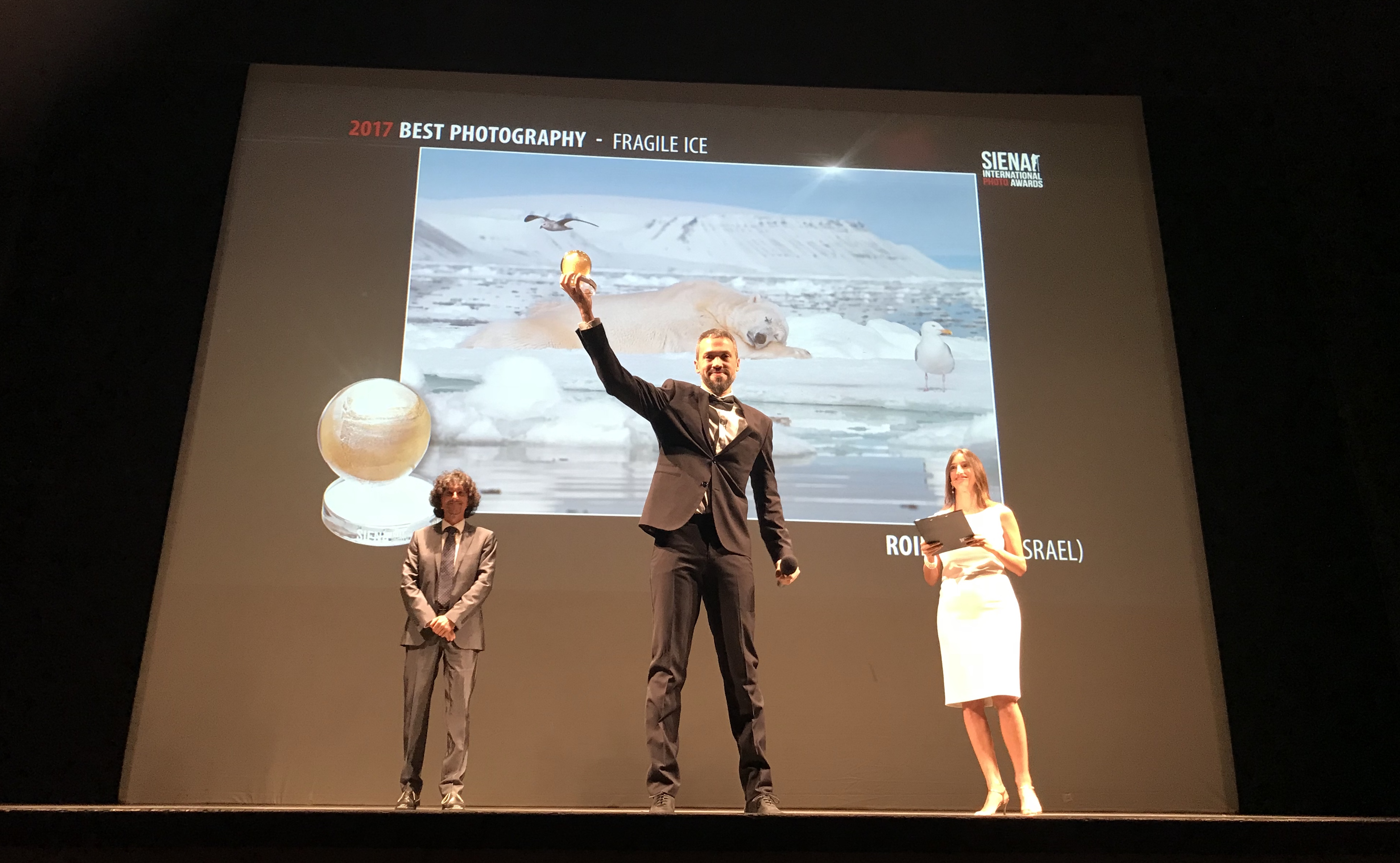
Roie Galitz receives award in Siena International Photo Awards

This list of photography awards is an index to articles that describe notable awards given for photography. It does not include photojournalism, which is covered in the list of journalism awards. The list is organized by the region and country of the organization that gives the award, but some awards are open to international competitors.

== Americas ==
Country	Award	Venue / sponsor	Notes
Canada	Scotiabank Photography Award	Scotiabank	Canadian photography award
United States	Graphis International Photography Awards	Graphis Inc.	Honors creative excellence in numerous categories including portraiture, still life, fashion and beauty, sports, product, entertainment, fine art and more.
United States	Infinity Awards	International Center of Photography	Various categories
United States	$5,000 Excellence in Teaching Award; Personal Award; Social Award; Environmental Award; Excellence in Multimedia Storytelling Award	CENTER Santa Fe	Supporting dedicated photographers and lens-based artists through education, exhibition, sponsorship, and partnerships.
United States	Larry Sultan Photography Award	Pier 24 Photography	Six- to ten-week residency at the Headlands Center for the Arts in Sausalito, California
United States	Prestige Grant	Getty Images	Commercial photographers to realise a dream project
United States	W. Eugene Smith Grant	W. Eugene Smith Memorial Fund	Photographer with an innovative and intriguing sight of humans dealing with social, economical, political or environmental issues
United States	Ansel Adams Award for Conservation Photography	Sierra Club	Photographers who have used their talents in conservation efforts
United States	IPhone Photography Awards	IPPAWARDS	Photographers using an iPhone or iPad, various categories
United States	Inge Morath Award	Magnum Foundation, Inge Morath Foundation	Woman photographer under thirty years of age, to assist in the completion of a long term documentary project
United States	International Photography Awards	Lucie Awards	International Photographer of the Year, Discovery of the Year
United States	Lange-Taylor Prize	Duke University	To encourage collaboration between documentary writers and photographers
United States	Lucie Awards	Lucie Foundation	Various categories
United States	Robert Capa Gold Medal	Overseas Press Club	Best published photographic reporting from abroad requiring exceptional courage and enterprise
United States	Top Photo Awards	TopPhotoAwards	Various Categories
United States	Hall of Fame Induction and Awards	International Photography Hall of Fame	Various categories

== Asia ==
Country	Award	Venue / sponsor	Notes
China	China International Press Photo Contest	China Photojournalists Society	Photojournalism
Dubai	Hamdan International Photography Award	Crown prince Hamdan of Dubai	Largest monetary prize among photography awards
India	Pure Street Photography	PSP	Largest Street Photography Awards
India	National Photography Awards	Ministry of Information and Broadcasting	Lifetime Achievement Award, Professional Photographer of the Year and Amateur Photographer of the Year
Iran	Sheed Award	Sheed Award	Social documentary photography
Israel	Local Testimony	Eretz Israel Museum	Photographers from Israel and the Palestinian Authority
Israel	Shpilman International Prize for Excellence in Photography	Israel Museum	Outstanding contributions for field of photography as contemporary art
Japan	Photo City Sagamihara	Photo City Sagamihara	Various categories
Japan	Domon Ken Award	Mainichi Shimbun	Established photographer for a published book of documentary photographs
Japan	Higashikawa Prize	Town of Higashikawa, Hokkaido	Various categories
Japan	Tokyo International Foto Awards	TIFA	commends and promotes outstanding photography from all corners of the globe. TIFA connects photographers with the creative community in Tokyo
Japan	Ina Nobuo Award	Nikon Salon	Most outstanding exhibition held in a Nikon Salon
Japan	Kimura Ihei Award	Asahi Shimbun Company	New photographers whose work has been exhibited or published during the previous year
Japan	Miki Jun Award	Nikon Salon	Best photo show at the Nikon Salon by an artist under 35 years old
Japan	Miki Jun Inspiration Award	Nikon Salon	Exhibition by photographers under the age of 35
Japan	Photographic Society of Japan awards	Photographic Society of Japan	Various categories
Japan	Society of Photography Award	Society of Photography	People, organizations and companies who have helped photography

== Europe ==
Country	Award	Venue / sponsor	Notes
Austria	Camera Austria Award	City of Graz	Contemporary photography
Denmark	Fogtdal Photographers Award	Palle Fogtdal	Danish photography
Europe	European Publishers Award for Photography	Several European publishers	Work on a particular subject that had not previously been published as a book
France	Prix de la Photographie	Px3	photography award
France	Carmignac Gestion Photojournalism Award	Fondation Carmignac	Investigative photographic report on a region of the world where fundamental rights are threatened
France	ICRC Humanitarian Visa d'or Award	Visa pour l'Image	Professional photojournalist who has covered a humanitarian issue related to an armed conflict
France	Niépce Prize	Association Gens d'Images	Professional photographer who has lived and worked in France for over 3 years
France	Paris Photo–Aperture Foundation PhotoBook Awards	Paris Photo, Aperture Foundation	First PhotoBook, PhotoBook of the Year, and Photography Catalogue of the Year
France	Prix Nadar	Association Gens d'Images	Photography book edited in France
France	Discovery Award; Author's Book Award; Historical Book Award; Photo-Text Book Award; Dummy Book Award	Rencontres d’Arles	Summer photography festival in Arles
Germany	German Society for Photography Awards	German Society for Photography	Various categories
Germany	World Street Photography Awards	World Street Photography	Street photography: Free style, Urban Geometry, Street Portraits, Decisive Moment, Shades and Lights, Reflections, Juxtaposition and Without Humans
Germany	David Octavius Hill Medal	Deutsche Fotografische Akademie	Photography
Germany	Deutsche Börse Photography Foundation Prize	Deutsche Börse, The Photographers' Gallery	Contemporary photography
Germany	Deutscher Fotobuchpreis	Hochschule der Medien	Visual-led book publishing originated in Germany
Germany	Dr. Erich Salomon Award	German Society for Photography	Lifetime achievement award for photojournalists
Italy	Castelfiorentino Award	Banca di Cambiano - Fondazione Teatro del Popolo	Two categories: Open and Student. Contemporary Photography
Italy	Romano Cagnoni Award	Romano Cagnoni Foundation	Supporting photographers who investigate, with depth and participation, topics related to the human condition
Italy	Siena International Photo Awards	Siena International Photo Awards	Photojournalism, wildlife photography, street photography, nature photography
Italy	"Werner Bischop - Flauto d'argento" (Silver flute) Photo Award	Photo Clubs: Werner Bischof and Avellino Photo	Photojournalism, social reportage and civil commitment
Netherlands	Foam Paul Huf Award	Foam Fotografiemuseum Amsterdam	Young, talented photographer under the age of 35
Netherlands	LensCulture Awards	LensCulture magazine	Various categories
Netherlands	Lex van Rossen Award	Eurosonic Noorderslag	Young European music photographers
Netherlands	No Man's Art Slum Photography Contest	No Man's Art Gallery	Photography in an underprivileged neighborhood in the world
Netherlands	Oskar Barnack Award	World Press Photo	Professional photographers whose unerring powers of observation capture and express the relationship between man and the environment in the most graphic form in a sequence of a minimum of 10 up to a maximum of 12 images
Netherlands	World Press Photo of the Year	World Press Photo Foundation	Photojournalism
Russia	Moscow International Foto Awards	MIFA	The mission of the Moscow International Foto Awards is to recognize, reward and expose talented photographers from around the world and introduce them to the creative community in Russia
Spain	PHotoEspaña	International Festival of Photography and Visual Arts of Madrid	Work by Spanish and international image-makers. Several categories
Spain	Premio Internacional de Fotografía Lúdica / International Boardgame Photography Award	Asociación Cultural Jugamos Tod@s - Festival Internacional de Juegos Córdoba	Photographs about the act of playing, people playing, games of the world, modern or classic boardgames, details of game components, set-ups and generally any display of games or playing.
Sweden	Hasselblad Award	Hasselblad Foundation	Photographer recognized for major achievements
Sweden	Hasselblad Masters Award	Hasselblad	Exceptional accomplishment through photography
Sweden	Lennart Nilsson Award	Karolinska Institute	Outstanding contributions to scientific photography
Switzerland	Prix Pictet	Pictet Group	Photography of the highest order applied to current social and environmental challenges
Turkey	Istanbul Photo Awards	Anadolu Agency	news photography contest
United Kingdom	International Print Masters	British Institute of Professional Photography	15 Categories, digital and print rounds, open to non-members and international entrants.
United Kingdom	Photography Prize	Worshipful Company of Painter-Stainers	Final year student at the annual Royal College of Art Degree Show
United Kingdom	AOP Awards	Association of Photographers	Professional, Assisting Photographer & Student photography
United Kingdom	British Wildlife Photography Awards	British Wildlife Photography Awards	Images of wild species and habitats taken in the United Kingdom, the Isle of Man, or the Channel Islands
United Kingdom	Jerwood/Photoworks Awards	Photoworks	Emerging photographers in the UK who make their own photography, or those who use photographs, archives or found photography
United Kingdom	John Kobal Foundation Award	John Kobal Foundation	Portrait Photography
United Kingdom	Royal Photographic Society	Royal Photographic Society	Various awards and medals
United Kingdom	Tim Hetherington Visionary Award	Tim Hetherington Trust	Innovation in visual storytelling
United Kingdom	Astronomy Photographer of the Year	Royal Observatory, Greenwich	Astronomy photography
United Kingdom	Cherry Kearton Medal and Award	Royal Geographical Society	Traveller concerned with the study or practice of natural history, with a preference for those with an interest in nature photography, art or cinematography
United Kingdom	Food Photographer of the Year	The Food Awards Company	Excellence in food photography
United Kingdom	Photo London	Somerset House	Various awards
United Kingdom	Portrait of Britain	British Journal of Photography	Portraits showing the diversity of British people
United Kingdom	Sony World Photography Awards	World Photography Organisation	Variety of photographic genres
United Kingdom	Taylor Wessing Photographic Portrait Prize	National Portrait Gallery, London	Photographic portrait prize
United Kingdom	LIF Award	London Image Festival	Prize for Film and Photography
United Kingdom	Travel Photographer of the Year	Travel Photographer of the Year	International travel photography award
United Kingdom	Wildlife Photographer of the Year	Natural History Museum, London	Wildlife photography
United Kingdom	The Architectural Photography Awards (APA)	World Architecture Festival	Annual international architectural photography award

== Oceania ==
Country	Award	Venue / sponsor	Notes
Australia	Australian Photographic Portrait Prize	Art Gallery of New South Wales	Photographic art prize, discontinued in 2007
Australia	Bowness Photography Prize	Monash Gallery of Art	Excellence in photography
Australia	Head On Portrait Award; Head On Landscape Award	Head On Photo Festival	
Australia	National Photographic Portrait Prize	National Portrait Gallery	

== See also ==
- Lists of awards
- List of media awards
- List of journalism awards § Photojournalism
