= Film still =

Photograph taken during production of a movie or television

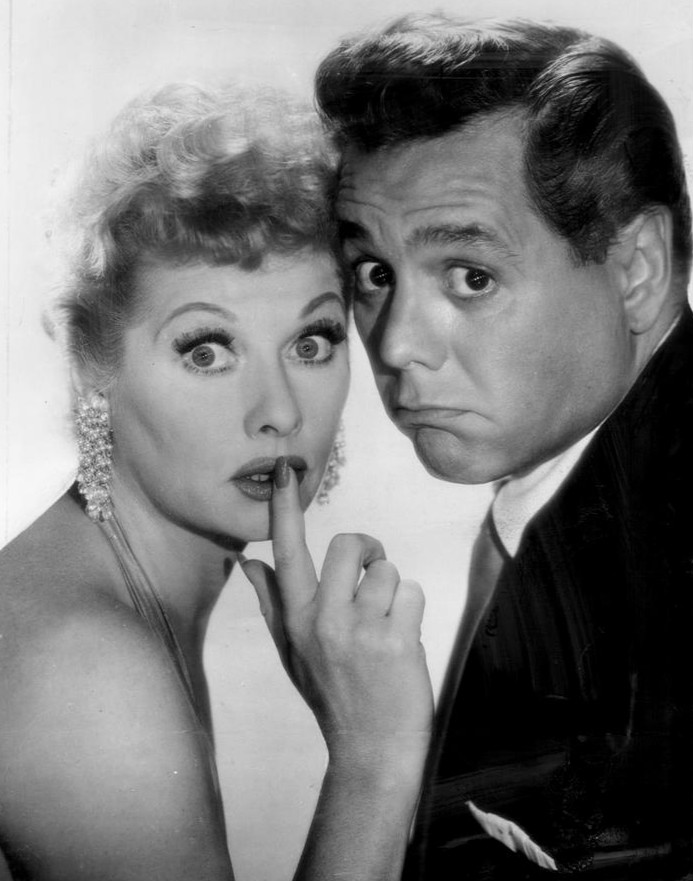
A publicity photograph of the actress Lucille Ball and her then-husband, the actor Desi Arnaz

A film still (sometimes called a publicity still or a production still) is a photograph, taken on or off the set of a movie or television program during production. These photographs are also taken in formal studio settings and venues of opportunity such as film stars' homes, film debut events, and commercial settings. The photos are taken by studio photographers for promotional purposes. Such stills consisted of posed portraits, used for public display or free fan handouts, which are sometimes autographed. They can also consist of posed or candid images taken on the set during production, and may include stars, crew members or directors at work.

The main purpose of such publicity stills is to help studios advertise and promote their new films and stars. Studios therefore send those photos along with press kits and free passes to as many movie-related publications as possible so as to gain free publicity. Such photos are then used by newspapers and magazines, for example, to write stories about the stars or the films themselves. Hence, the studio gains free publicity for its films, while the publication gains free stories for its readers.

== Types ==
Shots can be taken as part of the filming or separately posed. During the course of filming, the still photographer takes shots of on-stage scenes. These photographs are called production stills. Another type of still generated during filming is the off-stage shot. The photographer takes these while actors are between takes, still in costume. Separately posed stills include a wide variety of shots. Many of these have self-explanatory designations: seasonal gag shots, leg art, fashion stills, commercial tie-ups, poster art, clinch shots (special posing for print advertising), candids (done normally with one source lighting—think snapshot), and in-costume studies (most economically done off-stage in a sound stage corner or more formally in a studio setting). By far the most popular of these many kinds of film stills are those portraying glamour, menace or gag interpretations.

Other separately posed images include "set" stills, make-up stills, and wardrobe stills. These stills are used for matching from scene to scene, or for recreating a scene later for a re-take. All details of the set, the costume, and the cast make-up have to be exact, and these stills serve as a useful resource to get that accomplished. Background "plates" or "stereos" (not a reference to stereoscopic 3D, but to large-format stereopticon 2D slide projection), another type of still, enable the studio to create location scenes without leaving the premises, thus reducing the ultimate cost of production.

== Still photographers ==
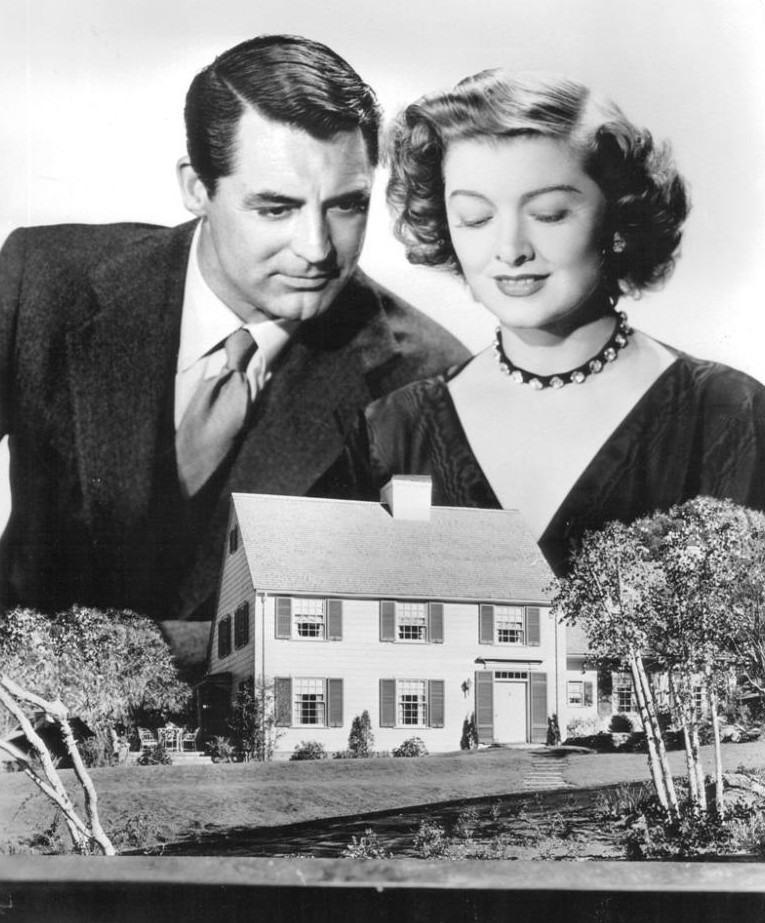
Promotional still for Mr. Blandings Builds His Dream House (1948) with Cary Grant and Myrna Loy

Movie still photography is considered a separate branch of movie making, that of marketing: "a still photographer usually works on set but is not directly involved in the making of a film. Their role is to publicize the film and actors, through their pictures on magazines, newspapers and other media." Film producer and cinematographer Brian Dzyak explains that the group of people who work on a film are referred to as the "company" or "unit." Among the professionals who are assigned to the unit, one is a "unit still photographer," whose job is to take still photos that the studios will later use for marketing. They may take photos during rehearsals or while standing next to the cameraman during filming of takes. For glamour publicity stills, given out to the public and press to promote a particular star, "special shoots" are made in separate studios, containing controlled lighting, backgrounds, clothing and furnishings.

Although the still photographer shares a number of skills and functions with the cinematographer, their work is essentially very different. The cinematographer is concerned with filming short scenes that will later be edited into an entire movie. The still photographer is primarily concerned with capturing dramatic photos that will draw attention when used on posters, DVD covers, and advertising. Studios would therefore assign a still photographer to a production, and in some cases as many as five still photographers worked on the same film.

Some stars, including Rita Hayworth, chose which photographer they wanted, in her case, Robert Coburn. Other notable still photographers were George Hurrell and Clarence Bull, known for being Greta Garbo's chosen photographer. Katharine Hepburn recalls her feelings when he also photographed her:

Clarence Bull was one of the greats — I was thrilled when I went to MGM to know that he was going to photograph me. I was terrified — Was I interesting enough?
He had done Garbo for years — The pictures were extraordinary. Her head — his lighting — they combined into something unique.

== Purposes ==
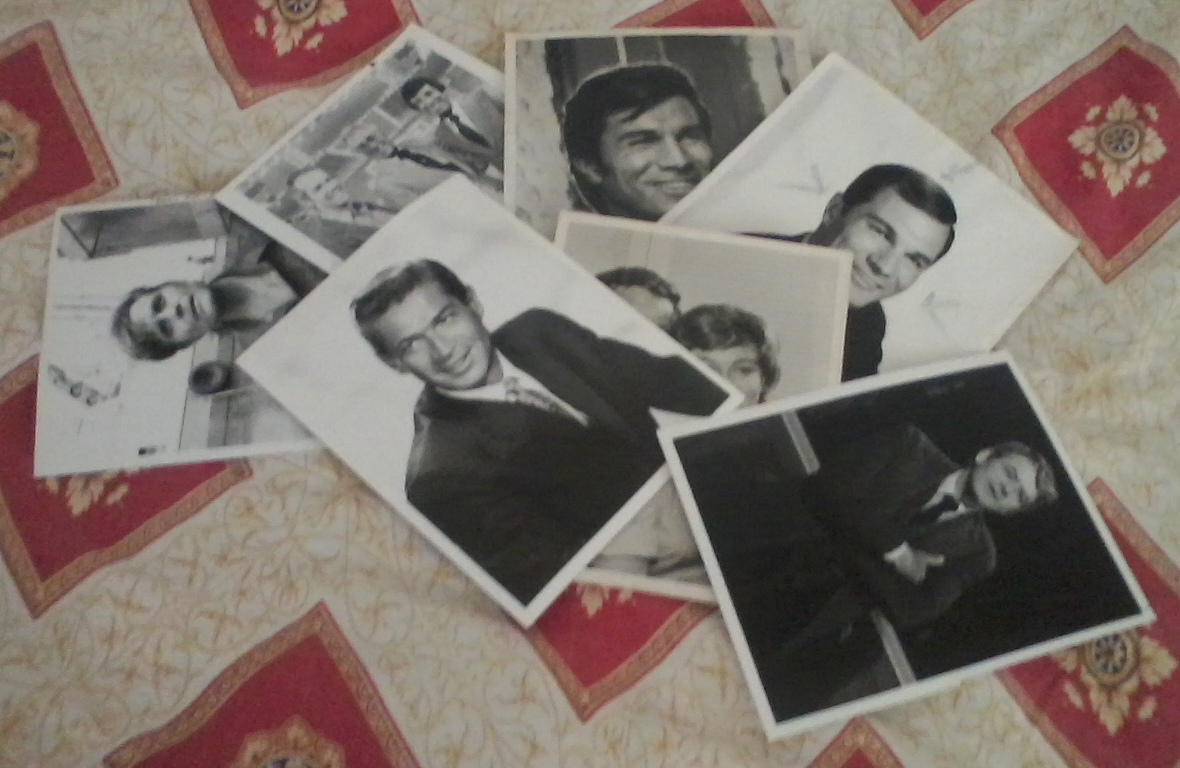
A pile of film stills

The major and minor film studios have always used still photos of stars, typically in a posed portrait, to send to the media to create "a buzz" for both their stars and any new films they were appearing in. Studios "sent out tens of thousands of scene stills and portraits to newspapers, magazines, and fans each year. Such photographs were rarely marked with the photographer's name or with a credit line."

Accordingly, the studio publicity departments used the stills "to sell a product," namely, a "particular film or an individual actor or actress." The distinction is relevant: "While the scene stills and on-the-set candid shots would be used to sell the movie, the portraits could be used to introduce a would-be star to an international audience. . . . The portrait photographer's function was to create and sell the image created by a publicity department around the life and look of a real person." The photos portrayed a star "without a role to hide behind. . . [and the photographer] had to recognize the image which would serve as the essence of a lengthy publicity campaign, capturing it in a fraction of a second." The glamour close-up would become "Hollywood's principal contribution to still portraiture."

Beyond basic publicity purposes, film stills were given to the actors themselves to send, signed or unsigned, to their fans and fan clubs. At various special events, stars might bring along a stack of these studio photos to sign in the presence of admirers, much like book signings by authors today.

In addition, directors and casting directors involved with placing appropriate actors in the film roles still rely on film stills to help them recall the detailed looks of actors. This is similar to the way magazine or TV advertisers rely on stills taken of professional models. Typically, a film still included a separate profile sheet describing the physical details of the actor along with a brief bio. The directors would then collect their best choices and schedule interviews and auditions.

== Artistic significance ==
Maxine Ducey, film archive director, has summarized the significance and contributions of the early film stills to the film industry:

The curtain has long been rung down on the golden age of Hollywood portraiture, but the portraits made by the Hollywood glamour photographers remain on stage. The photographs are a testimony to the photographers' skill and agility, as well as to their aesthetic sensibilities. Studying these portraits, we can never forget the talent of the photographers. We have proof of their consummate ability to capture in a single image the essence of a star, and to communicate that information to a film viewer, magazine reader or studio executive. Hollywood portrait photographers were not seen as artists or creators, yet one has only to examine their legacy to be convinced of the enduring quality of their vision as well as their craft.

== Copyright ==
=== United States ===
==== Public domain ====
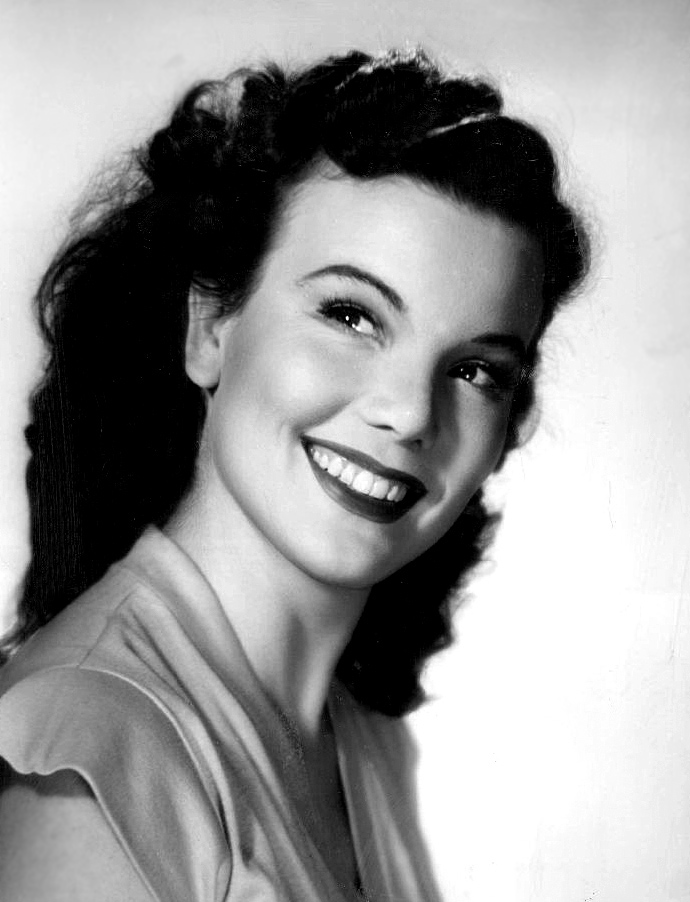
Publicity photo of Nanette Fabray in 1950

As explained by film production manager Eve Light Honthaner, prior to 1989 publicity photos taken to promote a film actor or other celebrity were not usually copyrighted, and were intended to remain free for publications to use wherever possible:

Publicity photos (star headshots) have traditionally not been copyrighted. Since they are disseminated to the public, they are generally considered public domain, and therefore clearance by the studio that produced them is not necessary.

Honthaner distinguishes "Publicity Photos (star headshots)" from "Production Stills (photos taken on the set of the film or TV show during the shooting)", noting that production stills "must be cleared with the studio". Creative Clearance offers the same text as Honthaner, but adds that newer publicity stills may contain a copyright.

In 2007, media lawyer Nancy Wolff, wrote with respect to the "photo archive of entertainment industry publicity pictures, historic still images widely distributed by the studios to advertise and promote their then new releases":

It has been assumed that these images are most likely in the public domain or owned by studios that freely distributed the images without any expectation of compensation. Archives will lend these images for a fee to publishers and producers of documentaries for 'editorial' uses, in keeping with the original intent to publicize the movie or promote the actor. Seeing these images in print years later, some photographers, or their heirs, attempt to assert rights that most believed to be extinguished or abandoned.

As a result, she indicates:

There is a vast body of photographs, including but not limited to publicity stills, that have no notice as to who may have created them.... Without knowing where the photos came from, or what long lost parent may appear and claim the 'orphaned work,' licensing the work becomes risky business. For publishers, museums, and other archives that are risk-averse, this leads to a large body of works that will never be published.

Film historian Gerald Mast explains how the new 1989 copyright revisions only protected publicity works that complied with all earlier requirements in addition to filing a copyright registration within five years of first publication:

According to the old copyright act, such production stills were not automatically copyrighted as part of the film and required separate copyrights as photographic stills. The new copyright act similarly excludes the production still from automatic copyright but gives the film's copyright owner a five-year period in which to copyright the stills. Most studios have never bothered to copyright these stills because they were happy to see them pass into the public domain, to be used by as many people in as many publications as possible."

In the 2011 Eighth Circuit case Warner Bros. Entertainment v. X One X Productions, the court recognized that a selection of publicity stills from two 1939 films were in the public domain because they had not been published with the required notice, or because their copyrights had not been renewed. Although Warner Bros. argued otherwise, the court found that these stills did not share the films' valid copyrights, and that the images' dissemination constituted general publication without notice. Other arguments related to derivative uses of the images were upheld, and an injunction against X One X was granted because certain "products combining extracts from the public domain materials in a new arrangement infringe the copyright in the corresponding film". The decision quoted from Nimmer on Copyright, which explains that, while films were generally registered for copyright protection, "much less care was typically exercised during production and in the publicity office" with photographs taken of the actors on set being "sent off to newspapers before the film's release, in order to generate a buzz about its opening."

==== Fair use ====
Kristin Thompson, reporting as the chair of an ad hoc committee on fair use organized by the Society for Cinema and Media Studies, contends "that it is not necessary for authors to request permission to reproduce frame enlargements. . . [and] some trade presses that publish educational and scholarly film books also take the position that permission is not necessary for reproducing frame enlargements and publicity photographs."

Thompson also notes that even if such images are not already public domain, they could be considered "fair use" under provisions of US law:

Most frame enlargements are reproduced in books that clearly fall into the first provision's categories of "teaching," "criticism," "scholarship," or "research," and hence there seems little doubt that such illustrations would qualify as fair use by this criterion. Since most university presses are nonprofit institutions, illustrations in their books and journals would be more likely to fall into the fair-use category than would publications by more commercial presses.

In addition, Thompson refers to the argument that the burden of proof of copyright for such publicity images would fall on the studios producing them:

One important argument has been made concerning the publication of publicity photographs. If such a photograph has been circulated for publication at some point and reproduced without a copyright notice accompanying it, it should then fall within the public domain. Throughout the history of the cinema, many publicity photos have appeared in newspapers and magazines without such notices. If a scholar or educator were to publish a publicity photo, the burden of proof would then fall on the studio or distributor to prove that the still had never been published without the copyright notice.

== See also ==
- Movie stills photographer
- Sound blimp
- Film frame
- Still frame (film & video)
