= Pure Street Photography =

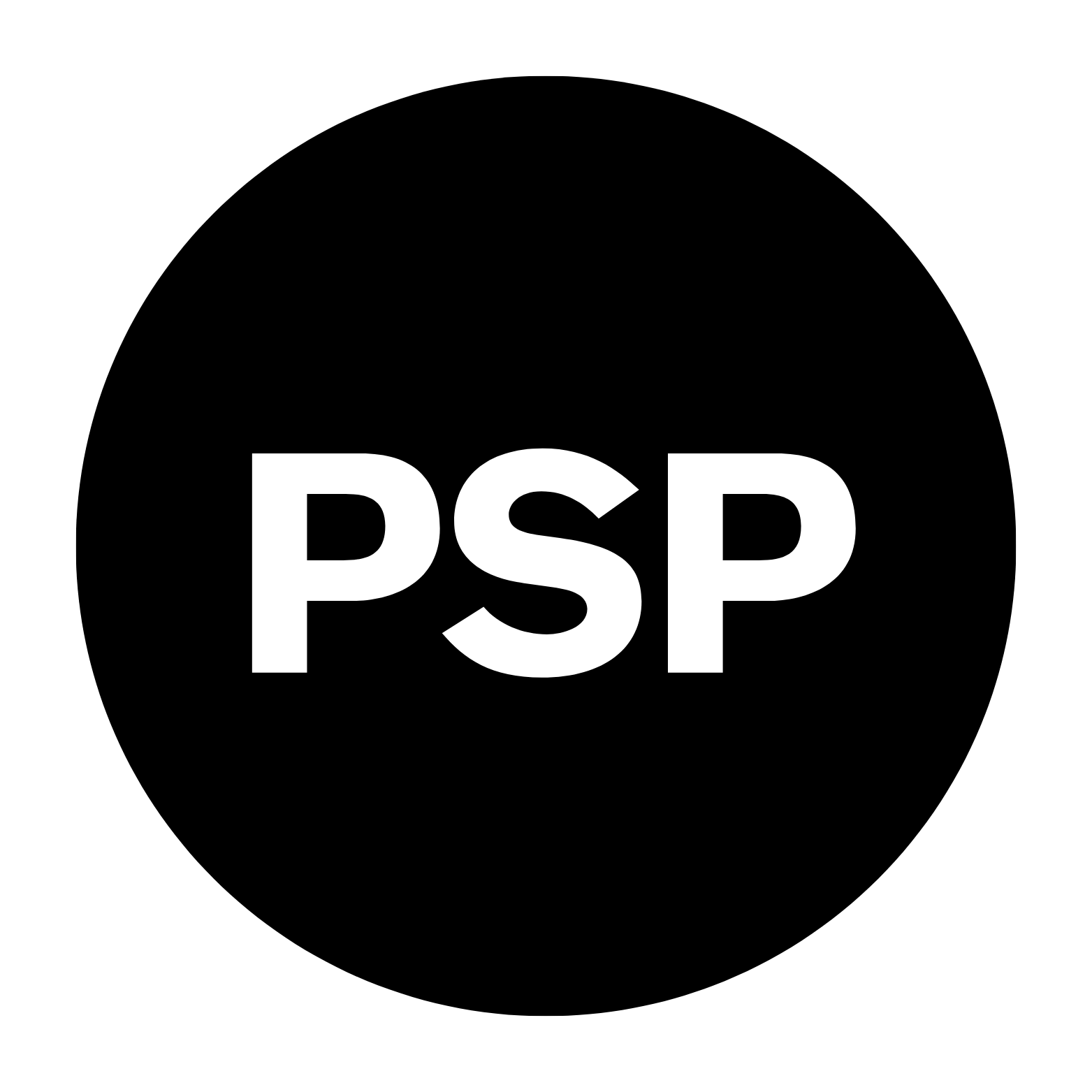
- Founded: 2020
- Founder: Dimpy Bhalotia; Kamal Kumaar Rao
- Website: www.purestreetphotography.com

Pure Street Photography (PSP) is an independent international street photography platform dedicated to the art of street photography through international awards, exhibitions, grants and community membership. Founded in 2020 by photographers Dimpy Bhalotia and Kamal Kumaar Rao, the platform has been covered by international publications including The Guardian Forbes, The Telegraph, Time Out, DPReview, Digital Camera World, Amateur Photographer, Homegrown PetaPixel, DPReview, and This Is Colossal.

Pure Street Photography Awards is part of the wider Pure Photography Awards (PPA) platform, which celebrates photography across multiple genres, including Portrait Photography Awards, Minimalist Photography Awards, Dog & Cat Photography Awards and Comedy Photography Awards.

== History ==
Pure Street Photography was founded in 2020 by photographers Dimpy Bhalotia and Kamal Kumaar Rao as an independent international platform dedicated to street photography.

The Pure Street Photography Awards 2025 received 1,160 submissions from photographers representing 34 countries. The competition was judged by David Campany, Curator and Creative Director at the International Center of Photography in New York. A total of 147 winning and finalist photographs were exhibited at Jehangir Art Gallery in Mumbai, India, from 22 to 27 January 2026. The exhibition attracted more than 25,000 visitors over six days.

The Pure Street Photography Awards 2026 received 1,582 submissions from photographers representing 50 countries. The competition was judged in two categories. The Open Category was judged by Fiona Shields, Head of Photography at The Guardian, while the Black and White Category was judged by Portuguese street photographer Rui Palha. A total of 166 winning and finalist photographs will be exhibited at Jawahar Kala Kendra in Jaipur, India, from 20 to 22 November 2026.

== Pure Street Photography Awards ==
Year	Categories	Judge	Grand Winner	First Place	Second Place	Third Place
2025	Open	David Campany	Stefanie Waiblinger (Germany)	Cazerella Tavs (UK)	Chris Yan (China)	Nicole Prüm (Germany)
2026	Open	Fiona Shields	Daniel Kashi (France)	Leone Von Dizic (Italy)	Taichi Naitou (Japan)	Marco Cajazzo (Italy)
2026	Black and White	Rui Palha	Cesare Simioni (Brazil)	Chris Mozyro (UK)	Jonathan Varjabedian (USA)	Sven Delaye (France)

== Pure Street Photography Grant ==
The Pure Street Photography Grant 2025 was launched to support street photographers through a cash prize and exhibition in Rome.

- Grand Winner: Ayanava Sil (India)
- 1st Place: Parvathi Kumar (USA)
- 2nd Place: Amy Horowitz (USA)
- 3rd Place: Sebastian Piatek (Germany)
- Finalists from 26 countries were exhibited in Rome, Italy.

== Membership ==
The Pure Street Photography Membership connects photographers from more than 39 countries. It provides curatorial support, visibility through the platform's global audience.

== Educational Programs ==
The platform conducts photography camps for children from underprivileged communities in India, aiming to make creative education and photography more accessible.

== Exhibitions ==
- The Jehangir Art Gallery Exhibition, Mumbai, India, 22 January 2026 – 27 January 2026.
- The Villa Altieri Exhibition, Rome, Italy, 26 September 2025 – 28 September 2025.
