= Lindokuhle Sobekwa =

South African documentary photographer (born 1995)

- Born: 1995 (age 30–31)
- Known for: Photography

Lindokuhle Sobekwa (born 1995) is a South African documentary photographer. He is a Nominee member of Magnum Photos and based in Johannesburg.

== Life and work ==
Sobekwa was born in Katlehong, a township, 35 km from Johannesburg, South Africa. He learned photography in 2012 through participation in the first Of Soul and Joy Project, an educational programme for young people run in the township of Thokoza; the workshop was given by Bieke Depoorter and Cyprien Clément-Delmas. His photo essay, Nyaope, about people who use the drug Nyaope in the township in which he lived and beyond, was published by the South African newspaper Mail & Guardian in 2014 and by Vice and De Standaard in 2015. He joined Magnum Photos as a Nominee member in 2018. The book I carry Her photo with Me (2024) "centres around his years-long search for a sister he never really knew, and who passed away when he was younger."

== Publications ==
- Free From my Happiness. With Sibusiso Bheka and Tshepiso Mazibuko. Edited by Bieke Depoorter and Tjorven Bruyneel. With essays by Sean O'Toole.
- I carry Her photo with Me. London: Mack, 2024. ISBN 978-1-915743-312.

== Awards ==
- 2017: Selected for Magnum Foundation Photography and Social Justice program to develop I Carry Her Photo With Me.
- 2018: Magnum Foundation Fund grant, to continue his series Nyaope.

== Group exhibitions ==
- No Man's Art Gallery pop-up gallery, Cape Town, South Africa, March–April 2014. Included Sobekwa's Series Nyaope.
- Free From My Happiness, International Photofestival of Ghent, Ghent, Belgium, 2015; Perignem, Beernem, Belgium, April 2016; Johannesburg Art Gallery, Johannesburg, South Africa, May–August 2016. Included Sobekwa's Series Nyaope as well as work by Sibusiso Bheka and Tshepiso Mazibuko. Curated by Tjorven Bruyneel and Bieke Depoorter.
- No Man's Art Gallery pop-up gallery, Tehran, Iran, May–June 2016. Curated by Lih-Lan Wong, Zohreh Deldadeh and Emmelie Koster. Included Sobekwa's Series Nyaope.
- Fresh Produce, Turbine Art Fair, Turbine Hall, Johannesburg, South Africa, July 2016.
