= Sebastiano Tomada =

Italian photojournalist (born 1986)

- Born: Sebastiano Tomada Piccolomini
- Education: Media, Photography
- Alma mater: Parsons the New School for Design
- Occupation: Photojournalist
- Known for: Conflict photography
- Website: www.sebastianotomada.com

Sebastiano Tomada (born 1986) is an Italian photojournalist. He is known for his conflict photography, documenting war in Afghanistan and conflicts in Libya, Syria, and the aftermath of the 2010 Haiti earthquake. His work has been commissioned by Vanity Fair, The Sunday Times, GQ, and The New Republic.

== Early life and education ==
Tomada was born in New York City to Italian parents. He was raised in Italy but returned to New York City, where he attended Parsons the New School for Design. He aspired to be a fashion photographer and graduated in both Media Studies and Photography.

== Career ==
Tomada began his career while still attending Parsons, working as an assistant photographer. He began to lose interest in fashion photography and began exploring war photography, based on his interest in human conflict. After graduation, he left for Afghanistan where he spent three months embedded with American Troops in 2009. He returned to Afghanistan every year until 2013.

Tomada began covering the Syrian Civil War in 2012. During his time in Syria, the group he traveled with was attacked by the Syrian Army and was trapped in the basement of an abandoned factory. After a day in the basement, Tomada began photographing rebel fighters he was trapped with, with each fighter posing with one object they felt was essential. The work became known as "The Things They Carry." He is also credited with the photograph of Ahmed, the 8-year-old boy he captured smoking a cigarette and holding an AK-47.

== Recognition ==
While in Aleppo, he found an infant during the middle of an air strike. He waited with the infant until his father and medical staff returned to help. His photo of the boy earned him second prize in the General News, single photograph category of the World Press Photo competition. He also received the International Committee of the Red Cross Humanitarian Visa d'Or prize for his work documenting the struggle to provide medical care in Aleppo to both civilians and combatants.

In 2017, his photograph of two Iraqi children roaming the streets of Qayyarah took Grand Prize Winner, Photographer of the Year Award at the iPhone Photography Awards.
