= John Kobal =

British film historian

John Kobal (born Iwan Kobal; 30 May 1940 – 28 October 1991) was an Austrian-born British based film historian responsible for The Kobal Collection, a commercial photograph archive related to the film industry.

== Biography ==
Iwan Kobal (named after his father) was born in Linz, Austria. The family emigrated to Canada when Kobal was ten and settled in Ottawa.

Kobal had a short-lived career as an actor in early 1960s London. He was an inveterate collector: magazines, postcards, pictures, any movie memorabilia. It was a chance encounter with Marlene Dietrich in Montreal, Canada in the late 1950s that led Kobal to develop his affection for the Golden Age of Hollywood. He used his contacts from a BBC freelance appointment in New York from 1964 to acquire Hollywood related photographs, and start The Kobal Collection, eventually numbering about 500,000 images dating from the end of the silent era to contemporary movies.

The author of 30 books, Kobal is credited by some for 'rediscovering' the great Hollywood Studio photographers – including George Hurrell, Laszlo Willinger, Clarence Sinclair Bull, Ted Allan - who were employed by the movie studios to create portraits of their stars.

Kobal was responsible for organizing the first exhibition of Hollywood related photographs at London's Victoria and Albert Museum in 1974. He reunited these forgotten artists with their original negatives and produced new prints for many subsequent exhibitions mounted worldwide at, amongst others, National Portrait Gallery, London; Museum of Modern Art, New York; National Portrait Gallery (United States), and Los Angeles County Museum of Art.

The critic John Russell Taylor has described Kobal's contribution to film studies as "unique" and added "Serendipity played some part in this too: by accident, John's timing was spot on. When he became interested in the men behind the images, almost all of them were still alive and reachable. But it was John who realized their importance, sought them out, and was ready to acquire, preserve and protect hundreds of the original negatives at a time when no one else gave a damn about them. For those who knew him, John regularly tops their lists of "The Most Memorable Person I Ever Met". For those who didn't, one can best quote Sir Christopher Wren's tombstone: If You Seek His Monument, Look Around You."

Kobal died aged 51 of HIV-related pneumonia in London.

His final biography, The Lost World of DeMille (University Press of Mississippi), was not published until 2019.

== The John Kobal Foundation ==
The John Kobal Foundation, to which he donated his archive of fine art prints and negatives, was established as a registered charity at the end of 1992 and presented an annual award for portrait photography - John Kobal Photographic Portrait Award - at the National Portrait Gallery, London between 1993 and 2002. Since 1999, it has had no connection with The Kobal Collection and is a totally separate entity.

In recent years, the foundation sponsored, amongst other projects, the John Kobal Book Award in association with the Royal Photographic Society; John Kobal New Work Awards to help towards the costs of photographers creating or exhibiting new work; the National Media Museum Bursary Awards for emerging photographers; John Kobal New Work Award commissioned portraits (from 2012 to 2018) of an emerging person in the British Film Industry for the National Portrait Gallery (as part of their annual Taylor Wessing Awards - the successor to the original John Kobal Photographic Portrait Award); and, a John Kobal Residency Award (from 2015 to 2017), with Photo London, enabling an artist to spend two months in New York making work and meeting contacts at galleries, museums and with collectors.

In January 2023, it announced The John Kobal Foundation Fellowship, worth £50,000, to be awarded every two years to an artist or collective who, in the view of an international selection board appointed by the Foundation, has established an outstanding body of lens-based work. The winner of the inaugural John Kobal Foundation Fellowship was South African photographer Lindokuhle Sobekwa.
