= World Street Photography =

Nonprofit organization for street photographers

World Street Photography is an independent nonprofit organization and community created for street photographers by the non-profit Kujaja organisation. World Street Photography was founded in February 2014 by Gido Carper with the intention of giving street photographers a community and a public arena to show their street photography. Profit from its photobooks is given to charitable organizations.

== World Street Photography Awards ==
The World Street Photography Awards are street photography competitions divided into 8 categories representing different types of street photography: Free style, Urban Geometry, Street Portraits, Decisive Moment, Shades and Lights, Reflections, Juxtaposition and Without Humans. Winners receive an award and are included in the annual World Street Photography Photobook and/or shown in the yearly exhibition. The judges are Alex Coghe, Chris Suspect, Michael Ernest Sweet, Don Springer, Jonathan Highbee, Lara Kantardjian, Lauren Welles, Peter Kool, Tatsuo Suzuki, Setsiri Silapasuwanchai and Siegfried Hansen.

=== Publications by World Street Photography ===
- World Street Photography book 2013/2014. 2014.
- World Street Photography 2015. Gudberg Nerger. ISBN 978-3-945772-06-5.
- World Street Photography 3. Gudberg Nerger. ISBN 978-3-945772-21-8.
- World Street Photography 4. Gudberg Nerger. ISBN 978-3-945772-32-4.

== Exhibitions ==
- The Gudberg Nerger Gallery Exhibition, Hamburg, Germany, 24 June 2015 – 15 August 2015.
- The Gudberg Nerger Gallery Exhibition, Hamburg, Germany, 21 July 2016 – 28 August 2016.
- The Gudberg Nerger Gallery Exhibition, Hamburg, Germany, 20 July 2017 – 27 August 2017.

== Charitable donations ==
The profit from the two World Street Photography Photobooks was donated to Ashalayam.
