= Dimpy Bhalotia =

Indian photographer

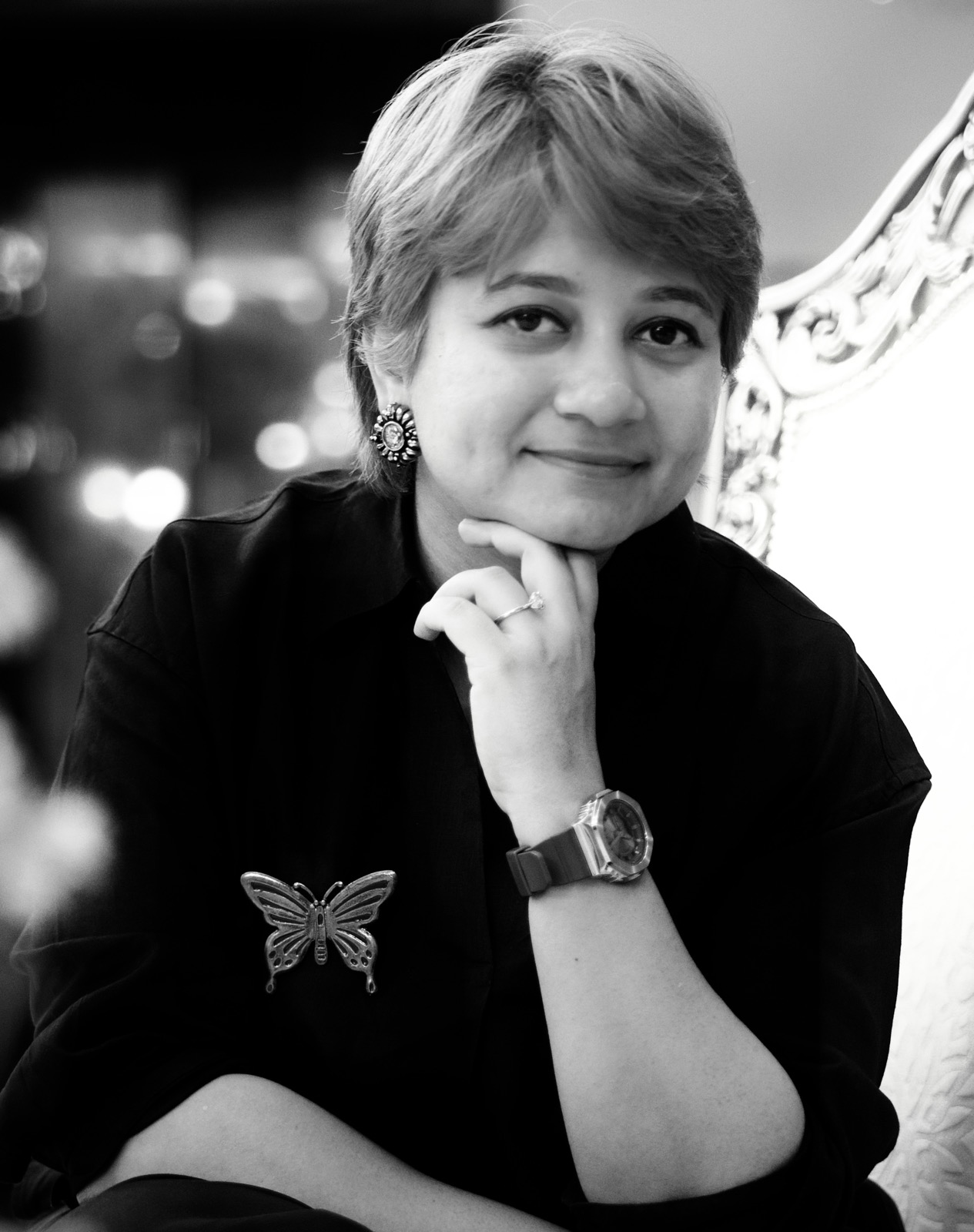
- Born: 1987 (age 38–39)
- Education: London college of fashion, University of the Arts London
- Known for: Photography
- Style: Street Photography
- Awards: Photographer of the Year, iPhone Photography Awards, 2020
- Website: www.dimpybhalotia.com

Dimpy Bhalotia (born 1987) is an Indian street photographer based in London and Mumbai. In 2020, she was one of the winners of the British Journal of Photography's Female in Focus Award, and won the Grand Prize Award in the iPhone Photography Awards.

== Life and work ==
Bhalotia was born and grew up in Mumbai, India. After school, she moved to London and gained a BA in Fashion Design Technology: Womenswear from the London College of Fashion, University of the Arts London.

Her work has appeared in The Guardian, The Washington Post, The Telegraph, L'Officiel and Mare. The paperback edition of the novel Djinn Patrol on the Purple Line (2021) by Deepa Anappara used photographs by Bhalotia in its cover design.

== Awards ==
- 2019: 2nd Place, Italian Street Photo Festival
- 2019: 1st Place, The Independent Photographer
- 2019: 2nd place, series, iPhone Photography Awards
- 2019: Grand Winner, Photobox Instagram Photography Awards (PIPA)
- 2019: 1st Place, StreetFoto San Francisco
- 2020: Grand Winner, Paris International Street Photo Awards
- 2020: 1st Place, Gold star Award, ND Awards
- 2020: 1st Place, Fotografia Alicante Monovisions Award
- 2020: 2nd Place, Oneshot: Movement, International Photography Awards (IPA)
- 2020: 2nd Place, People, International Photography Awards (IPA)
- 2020: Grand Prize Winner, Photographer of the Year category, iPhone Photography Awards (IPPAWARDS) for her photograph "Flying Boys" photographed in Banaras, India
- 2020: Gold in Advertising, Budapest Foto Awards
- 2020: Gold in Special/Smartphone Photography; second place in Special, The Prix de la Photographie
- 2020: VI Concurso Internacional de Fotografía Alicante
- 2020: 1 of 20 Single Image category winners, Female in Focus Award, British Journal of Photography
- 2021: 1st Place, The Spider Awards
- 2022: 3rd place, Lifestyle category, iPhone Photography Awards (IPPAWARDS)

== Publications with contributions by Bhalotia ==
- #ICPConcerned: Global Images for Global Crisis. Glitterati. By David Campany. ISBN 978-1943876228. Published in conjunction with an exhibition at the International Center of Photography in New York, 2020. Bhalotia contributed a photograph.

== Solo exhibitions ==
- 2026 – Small Lens, Big World, Florida Museum of Photographic Arts, Tampa, Florida, United States.

== Group exhibitions and during festivals ==
- Brussels Street Photography Festival, Brussels, Belgium, 2019
- PhoS Sofia Street Photography Days, Bulgaria, 2019
- El Barrio Art Space PS109, New York, USA, 2019
- Treviso Photographic Festival, Treviso, Italy, 2020
- The State Historical Museum of the Southern Urals, Chelyabinsk, Russia, 2020
- CLB Berlin Gallery for The Independent Photographer
- Posters on the Streets, New York 6 locations, USA, 2020
- Fédération Internationale de l'Art Photographique, Turkey, 2020
- International Centre of Photography, USA, 2020
- Paris Espace Beaurepaire, Paris, France, 2021
