= Clarence Sinclair Bull =

American portrait photographer

- Born: May 1896; Sun River, Montana, U.S.
- Died: June 8, 1979 (aged 83); Los Angeles, California, U.S.
- Other name: C. S. Bull
- Occupation: Portrait photographer
- Years active: 1918–1960
- Spouse: Jeanne Bull (m. 1942)

Clarence Sinclair Bull (May 1896 – June 8, 1979) (Note: Sources vary regarding Bull's date of birth, with dates including May 22, May 23, or May 26.) was an American portrait photographer and head of the stills department of film studio Metro-Goldwyn-Mayer during the Golden Age of Hollywood. He is estimated to have photographed over 10,000 subjects over the course of his career, which spanned over forty years.

Born in Sun River, Montana, Bull began taking nature photographs in his youth. After graduating high school, he enrolled at the University of Michigan before moving to Los Angeles. He was hired as a portrait photographer by Samuel Goldwyn at Metro-Goldwyn-Mayer in 1918.

Bull is known for his photographs of numerous performers, in particular actress Greta Garbo, who favored him so much that she appointed him as her personal photographer. Bull is estimated to have taken over 4,000 photographs of Garbo over the course of his career. Bull's work is held in numerous international collections, including the Museum of Modern Art, the J. Paul Getty Museum, and the National Portrait Gallery in London.

== Early life ==
Clarence Sinclair Bull was born in Sun River, Montana in 1896, to Bell Sinclair, a schoolteacher, and Charles Albert Bull, a cattle rancher and local postmaster. His mother, of Scottish descent, was a Canadian from Chatham, Ontario who immigrated to the United States. He became interested in photography as a child, commenting: "Before we left the ranch I was exposed to photography. An aunt from Glendive came to visit us when I was about 10 years old. We had a partly completed house, with a ladder fastened to the front. She took some pictures of the place. When they came back, the ladder was gone. That got me. I hadn’t heard about retouching."

While attending high school in Great Falls, Montana, Bull worked for the Ridgely Calendar Company, and became acquainted with Charles Marion Russell, a local painter whose nature portraits were featured in the company's calendars. Influenced by Russell, Bull began photographing numerous scenes in the Sun River Valley.

In 1914, he relocated to live with his aunt and uncle in Port Huron, Michigan, where he completed high school, though he spent summers in Sun River. After graduating, Bull enrolled at the University of Michigan, where he worked for a local photographer.

== Career ==
In 1917, while Bull was operating his own photography and print shop out of a Great Falls hardware store, he became acquainted with Alma Haller, the wife of director Frank Lloyd, via a customer. Impressed by Bull's work, she recommended Bull to her husband, who was at that time working on a film in Fort Lee, New Jersey. Lloyd agreed to hire Bull as a set photographer, but Bull's travels to Fort Lee were altered after he was informed via a telegram that the production would be moving to Los Angeles. Bull changed his route and headed to California, but upon arrival, was informed that Lloyd had ultimately decided to keep the production in Fort Lee.

Deciding to remain in Los Angeles, Bull found employment at Metro Studios working as a camera assistant on the film Breakers Ahead (1918), starring Theda Bara. During production breaks, he began utilizing his time to take informal portraits of the studio's stars, including Alla Nazimova, Helene Chadwick, and Irene Rich.

Based on his informal photographs, Bull was hired by Samuel Goldwyn in 1918 as a full-time publicity still photographer for Metro-Goldwyn-Mayer stars. He is most famous for his photographs of Greta Garbo, taken between 1926 and 1941. Bull's first portrait of Garbo was a costume study for the silent romantic drama film Flesh and the Devil in September 1926. He famously photographed her in character in the title role for Mata Hari (1931). Bull became a favorite of Garbo's, and was the only studio portrait artist whom she would allow to photograph her. He is estimated to have taken over 4,000 photographs of Garbo over the course of his career.

He also served as an assistant cameraman in 1918. Bull was skilled in the areas of lighting, retouching and printing. He was most commonly credited as "C. S. Bull."

After his retirement from Metro-Goldwyn-Mayer in 1960, Bull published a book of his photography, The Faces of Hollywood.

== Death ==
Bull died on June 8, 1979, at his home in Los Angeles, California, aged 83. He was survived by his wife, Jeanne.

== Collections ==
Bull's photographs are held in various collections internationally, including at the Museum of Modern Art in New York City, the J. Paul Getty Museum in Los Angeles, and the National Portrait Gallery in London.

Bull's photographs were also held by private collectors, among them British film historian John Kobal.

== Gallery ==
Photographs by Clarence Sinclair Bull
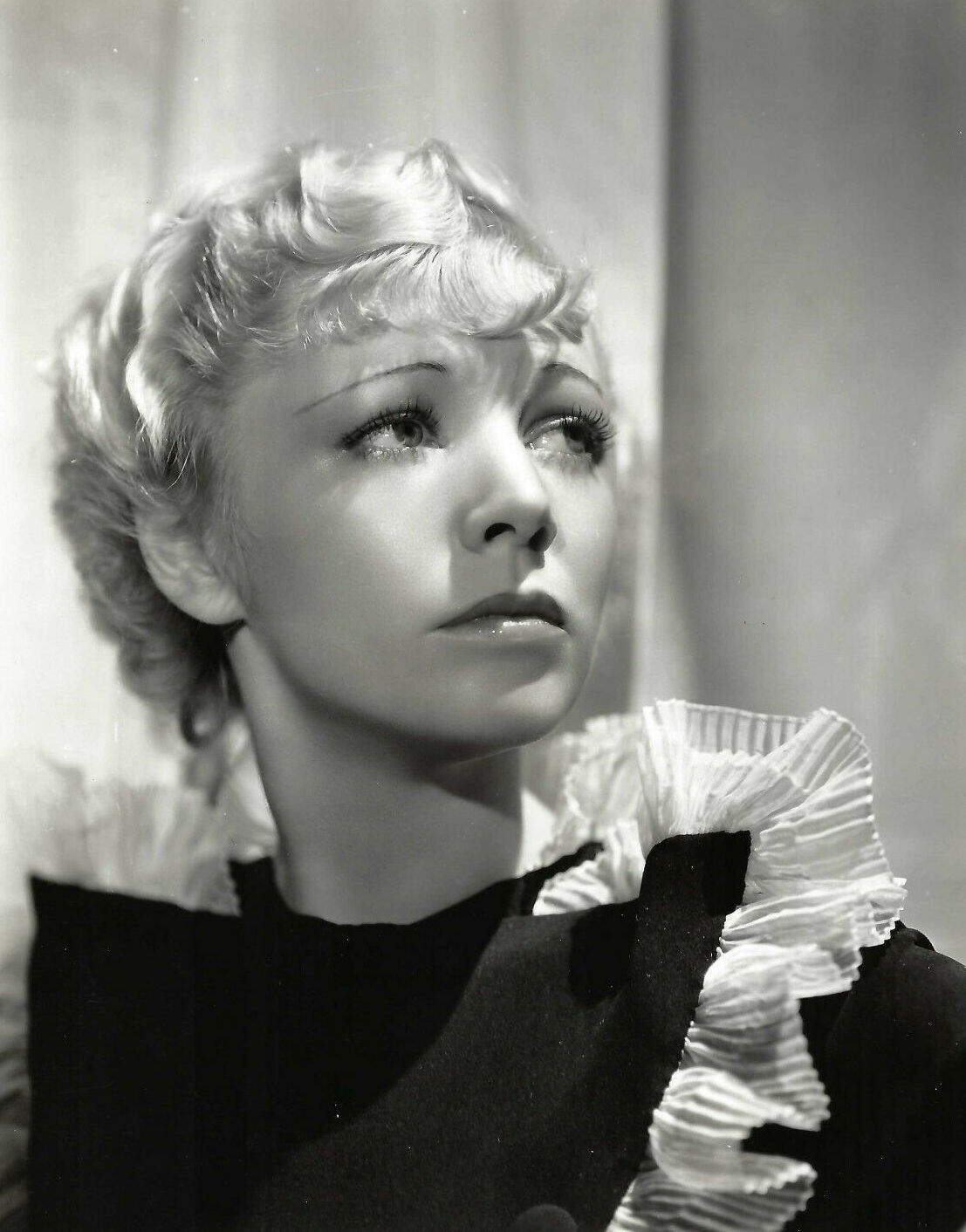
Isabel Jewell, 1933

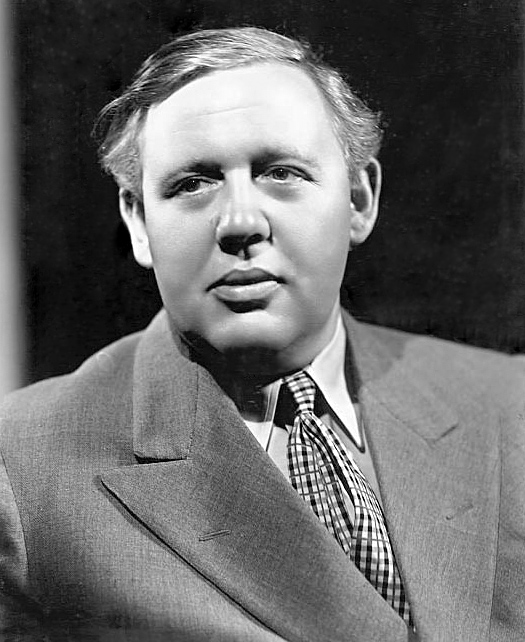
Charles Laughton, 1934

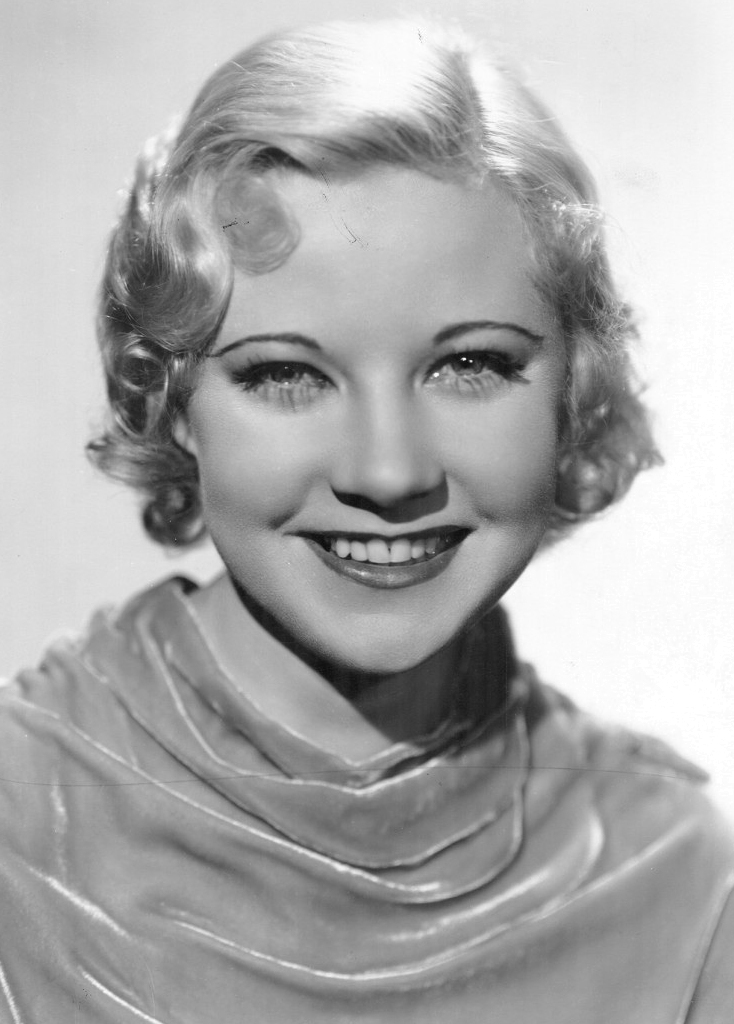
Una Merkel, 1934

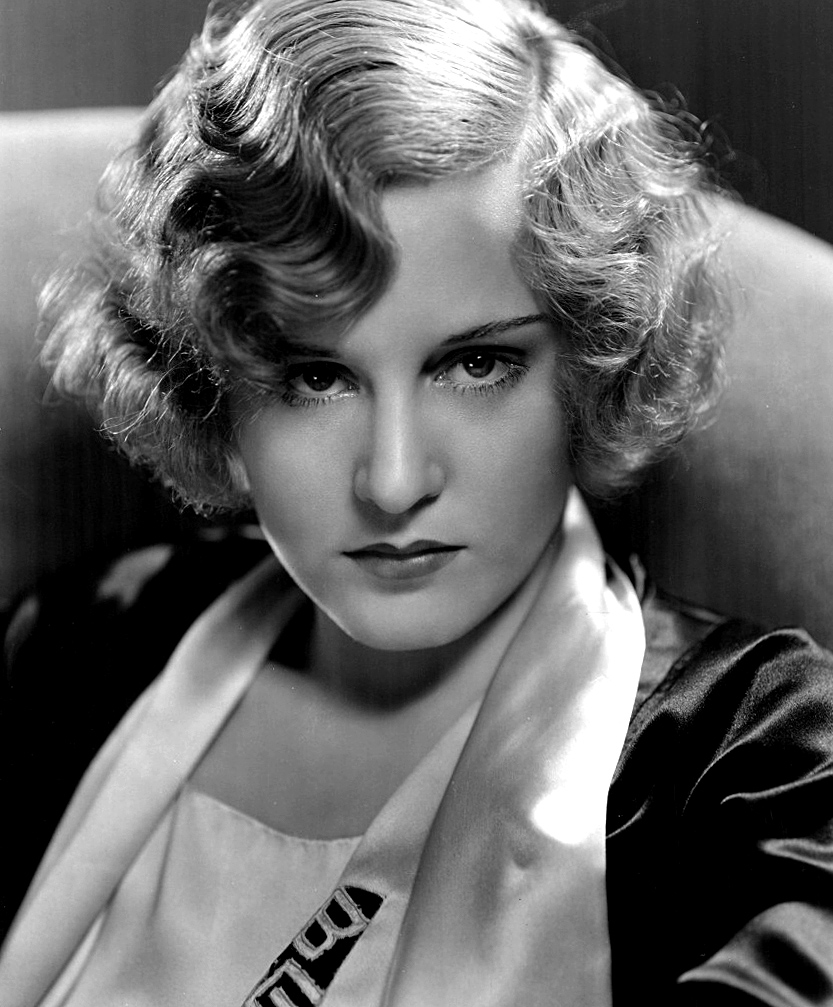
Madge Evans, circa 1935

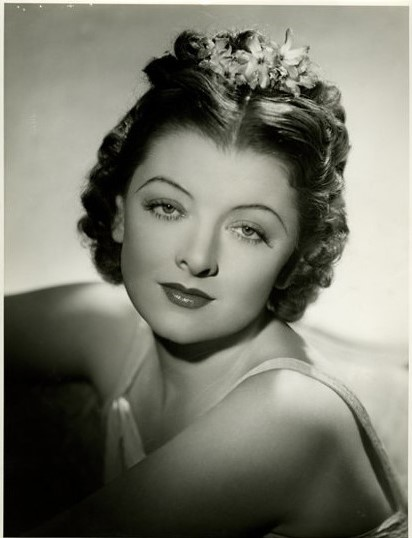
Myrna Loy, 1937

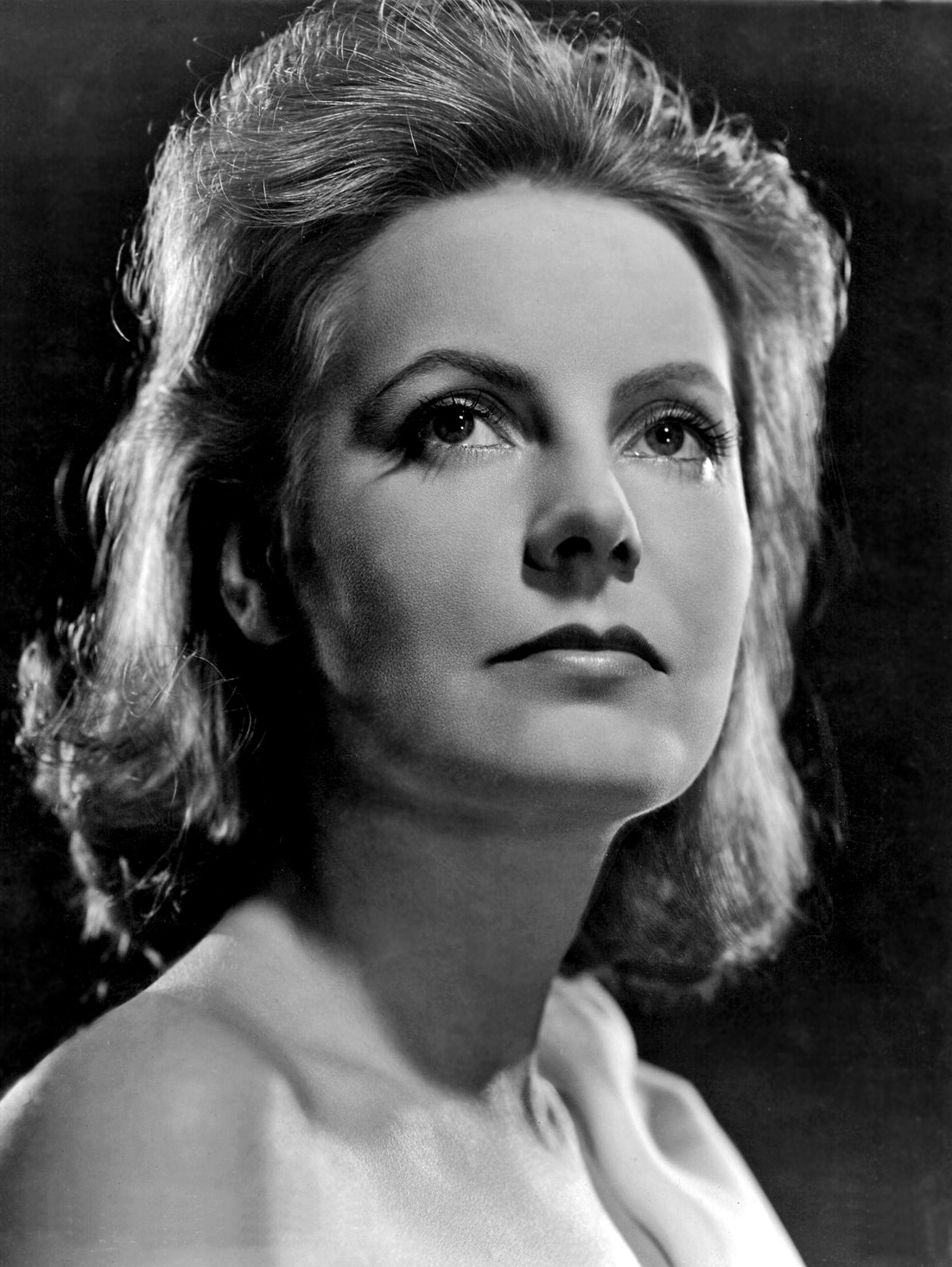
Greta Garbo, 1939

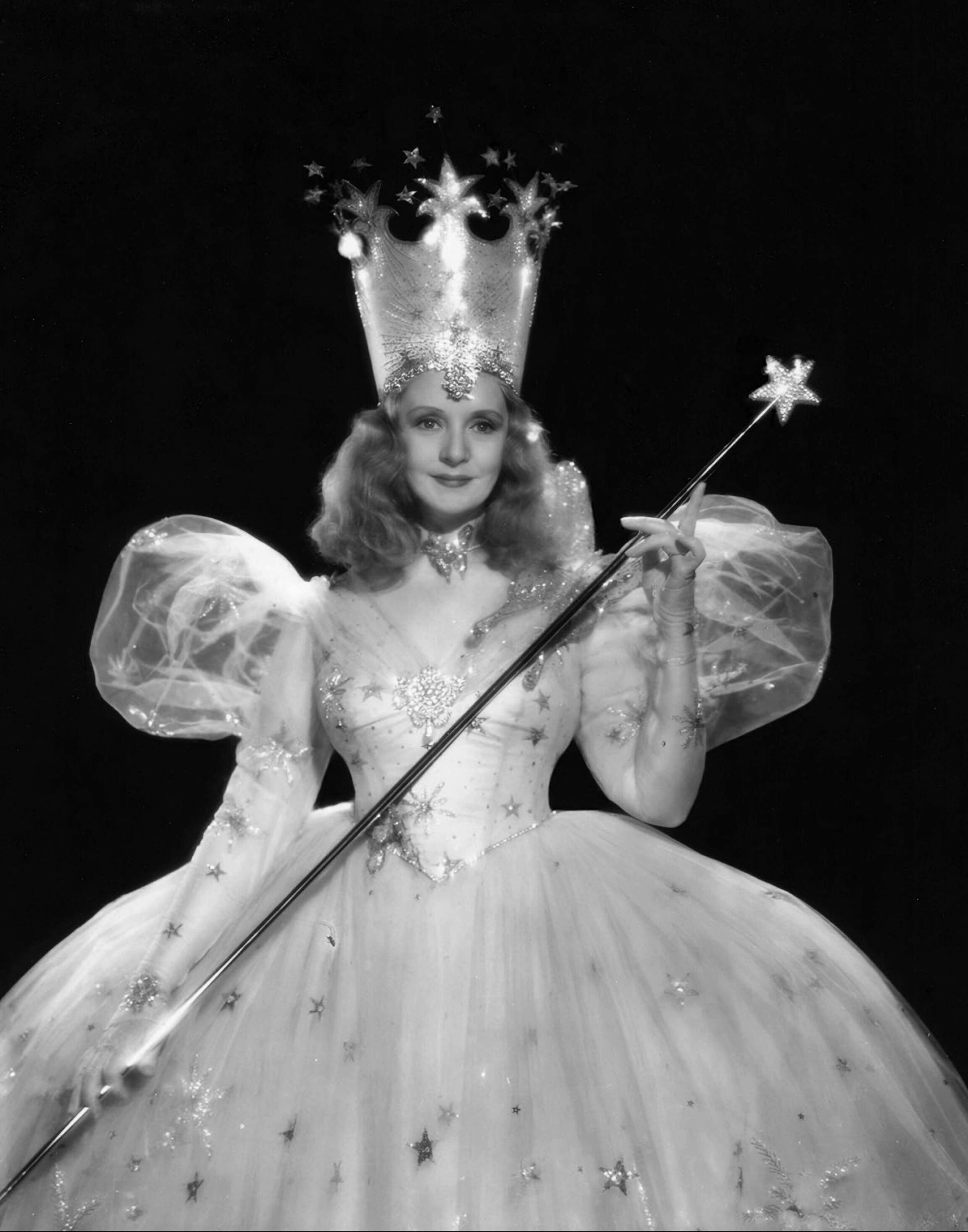
Billie Burke, 1939

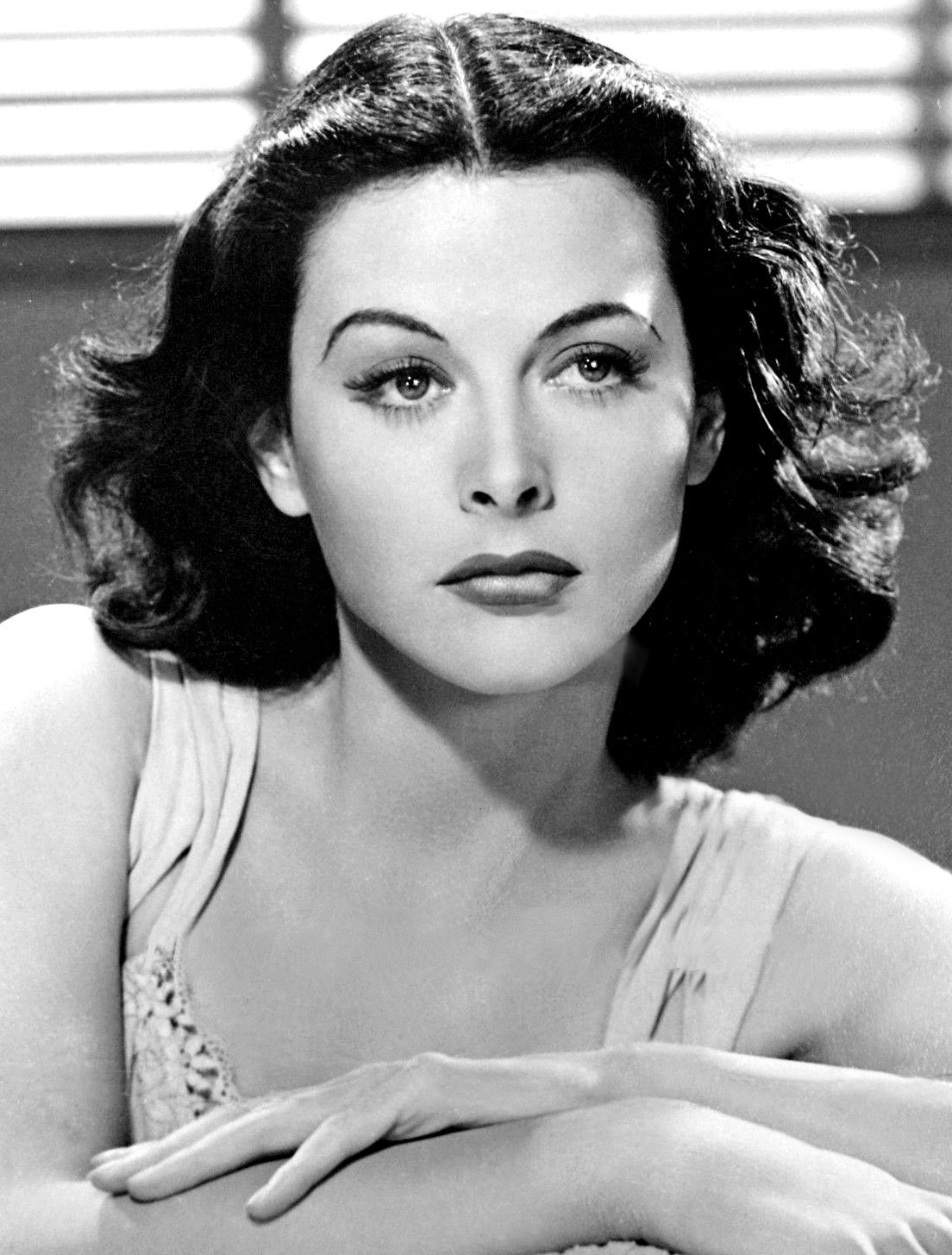
Hedy Lamarr, 1940

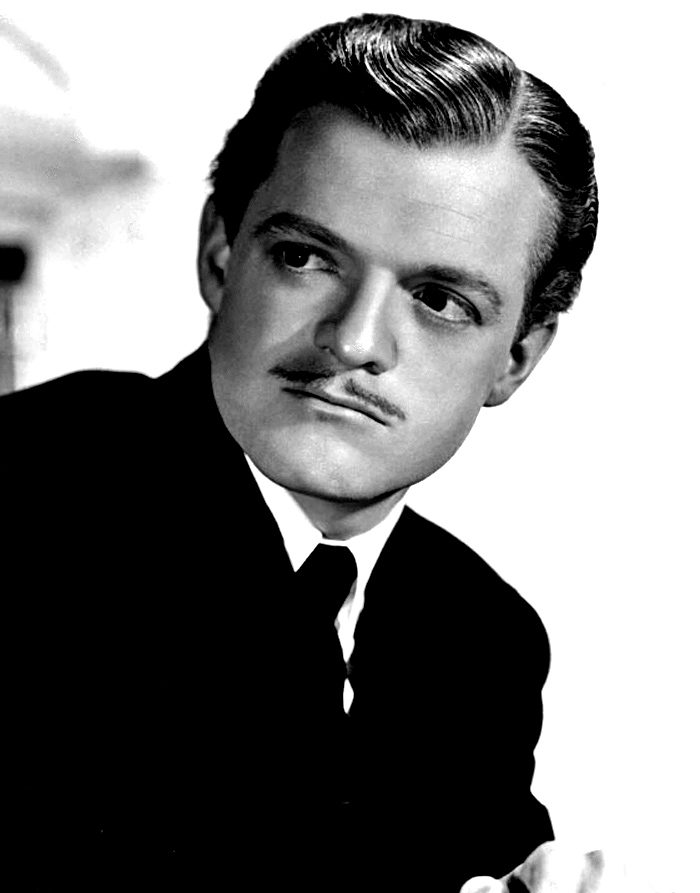
Van Heflin, 1941

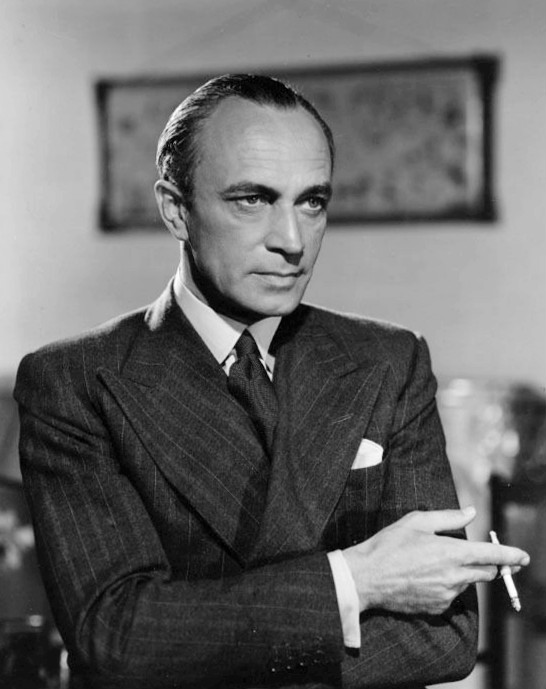
Conrad Veidt, 1941

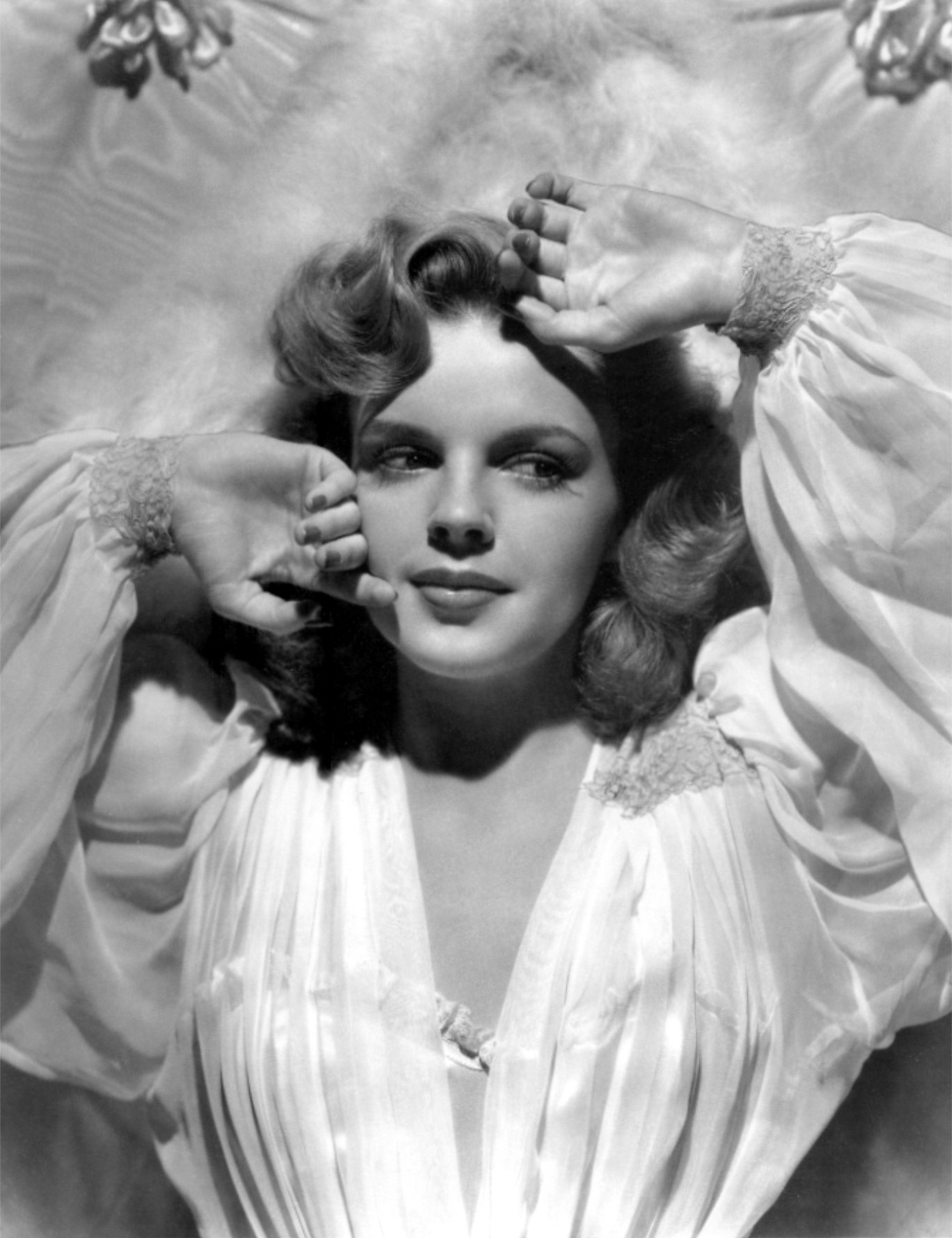
Judy Garland, 1943

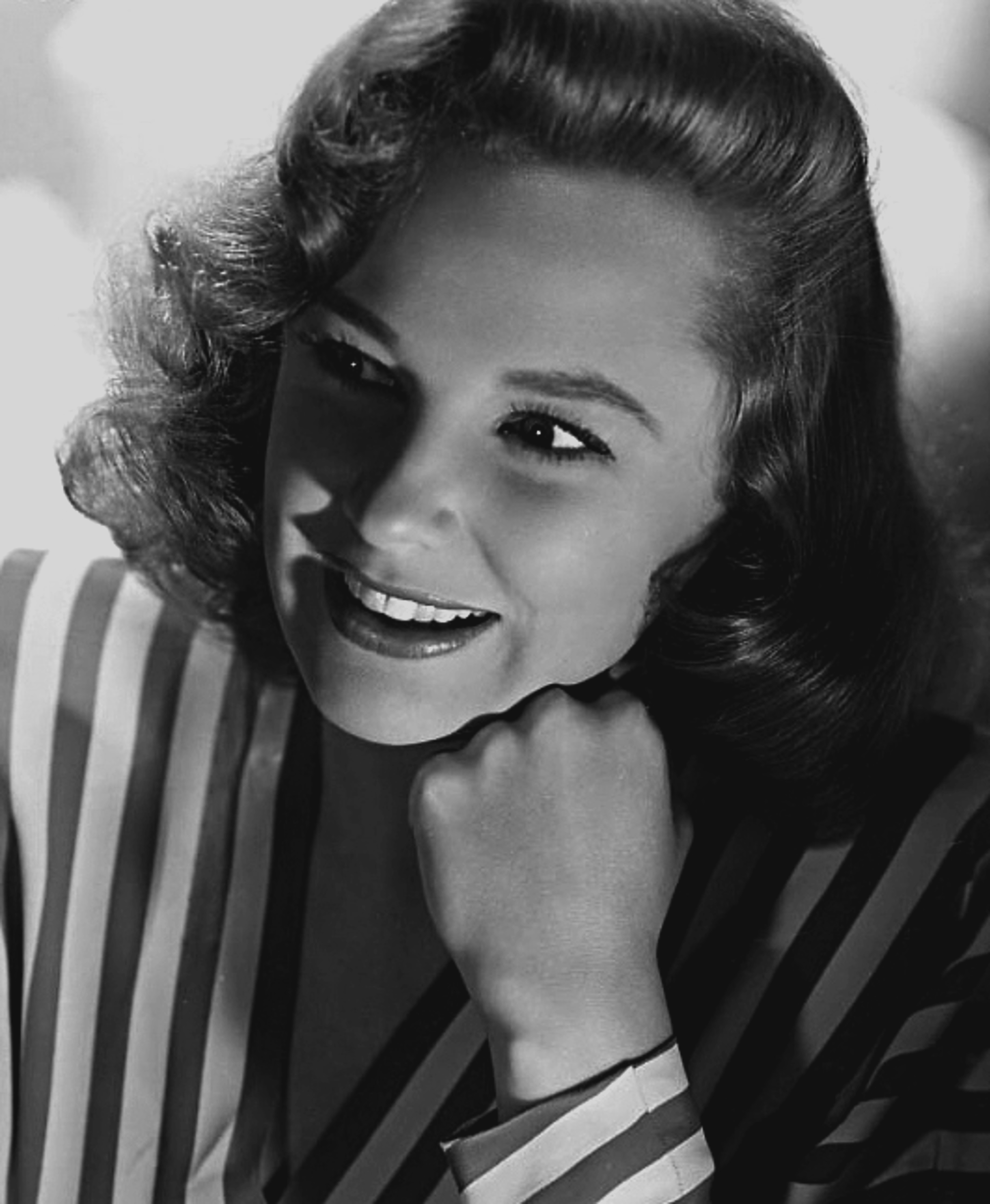
June Allyson, 1944

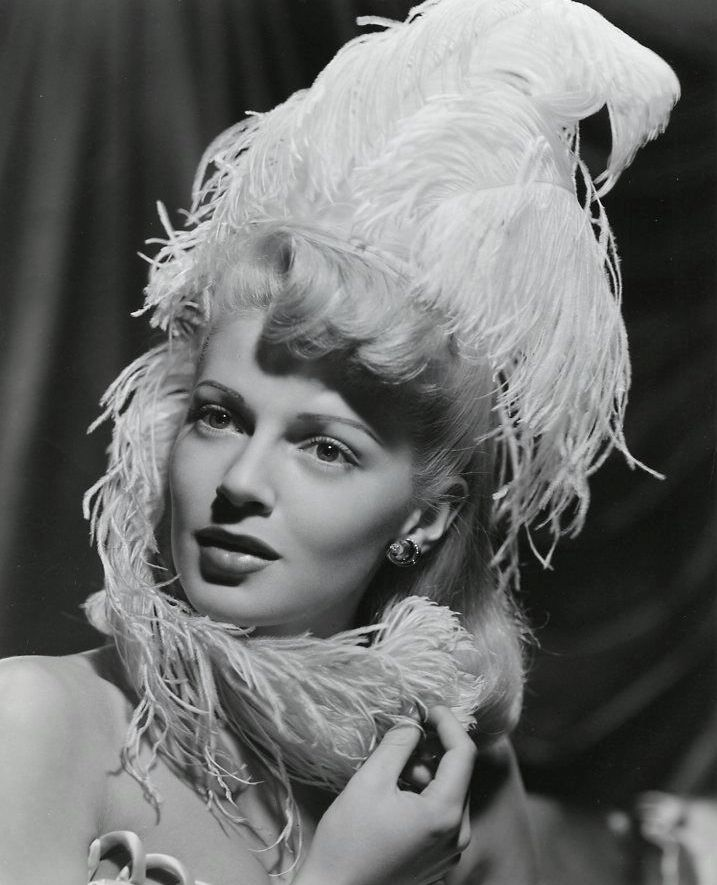
Lana Turner, 1944

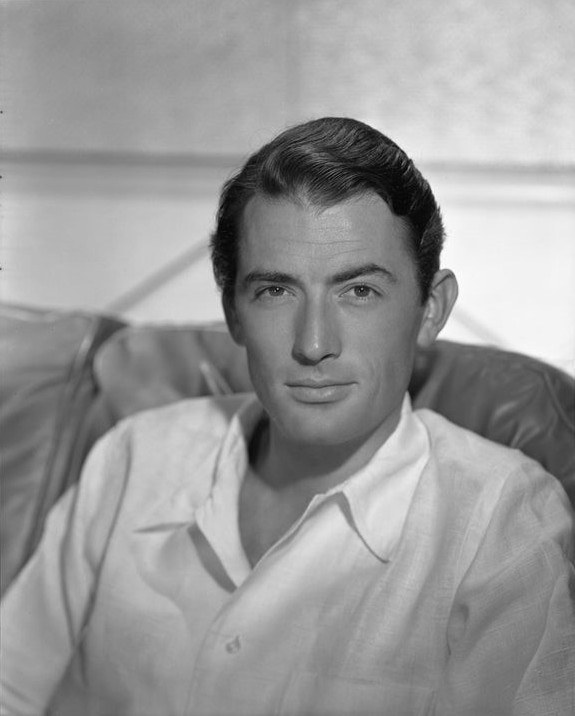
Gregory Peck, 1945

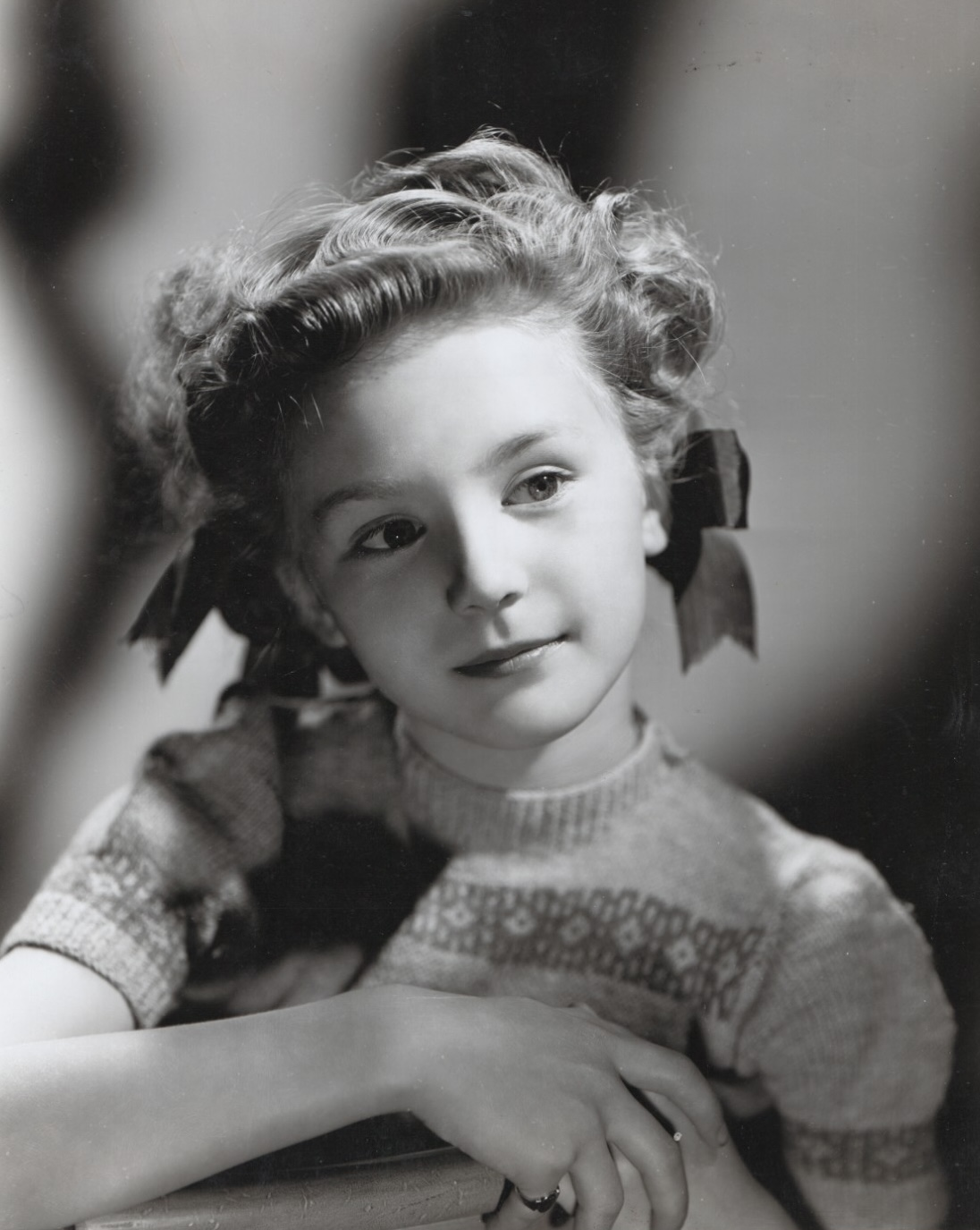
Kathryn Beaumont, 1948

== Sources ==
- Pepper, Terence (1989). The Man Who Shot Garbo: The Hollywood Photographs of Clarence Sinclair Bull. New York City, New York: Simon & Schuster. ISBN 0-671-69700-5. OCLC 20461098.
