= IPhone Photography Awards =

International photography contest

The iPhone Photography Awards (IPPAWARDS)
- Awarded for: Outstanding photography captured with an iPhone
- Country: International
- Presented by: IPPAWARDS
- First award: 2007
- Website: www.ippawards.com

The iPhone Photography Awards (IPPAWARDS) is an international photography contest for images captured with an iPhone. The award was founded in 2007, the same year the first iPhone was released. The contest is held annually, with one grand prize winner and three overall winners, as well as three winners for each of 19 subcategories.

== Prior winners ==
=== 2015 ===
- 1st Place - Michal Koralewski
- 2nd Place - David Craik
- 3rd Place - Yvonne Lu

=== 2016 ===
- 1st Place - Siyuan Niu
- 2nd Place - Patryk Kuleta
- 3rd Place - Robin Robertis

=== 2017 ===
- 1st Place - Sebastiano Tomada
- 2nd Place - Yeow-Kwang Yeo
- 3rd Place - Kuanglong Zhang

=== 2018 ===
- 1st Place - Alexandre Weber
- 2nd Place - Huapeng Zhao
- 3rd Place - Zarni Myo Win

=== 2019 ===
- 1st Place - Diogo Lage
- 2nd Place - Yuliya Ibraeva
- 3rd Place - Peng Hao

=== 2020 ===
- Grand Prize Winner, Photographer of the Year - Dimpy Bhalotia
- 1st Place - Artyom Baryshau
- 2nd Place - Geli Zhao
- 3rd Place - Saif Hussain

=== 2021 ===
- Grand Prize Winner, Photographer of the Year - Istvan Kerekes
- 1st Place - Sharan Shetty (India)
- 2nd Place - Dan Liu (China)
- 3rd Place - Jeff Rayner (USA)

=== 2022 ===
- Grand Prize Winner, Photographer of the Year: Antonio Denti (Italy)
- 1st Place: Rachel Sela (Sweden)
- 2nd Place: Kelley Dallas (USA)
- 3rd Place: Glenn Homann (Australia)

=== 2023 ===
- Grand Prize Winner, Photographer of the Year: Ivan Silva (Mexico)
- 1st Place: Thea Mihu (Germany)
- 2nd Place: Sasa Borozan (Bosnia and Herzegovina)
- 3rd Place: Derek Hager (USA)

=== 2024 ===
- Grand Prize Winner, Photographer of the Year: Erin Brooks (USA)
- 1st Place: Glen Wilbert (USA)
- 2nd Place: Anthony Maureal (USA)
- 3rd Place: Wenlong Jiang (China)

=== 2025 ===
- Grand Prize Winner, Photographer of the Year: Jarod Peraza (USA)
- 1st Place: Carol Addassi (USA)
- 2nd Place: Thiago Bernardes de Souza (Brazil)
- 3rd Place: Martha Nance (USA)
