= No Man's Art Gallery =

No Man's Art Gallery is the first art gallery to organize pop-up galleries in a different country every year.

The gallery, whose headquarters opened in 2018 in Bos & Lommer Amsterdam, e. experiments with creating an alternative art market structure in which artists can easily participate in different local art markets. Seeing the need for a more inclusive art market in a globalized world, through its pop-up method the gallery has been able to recruit upcoming talents in the city in which they are temporarily exhibiting at, then invite them along to future locations as well as to exhibitions hosted in the two spaces of No Man's Art Gallery in Amsterdam. During their stay in each pop-up location, No Man's Art sets up a network of artists, art lovers, buyers, press and supporters that the artists then can use independently in the future.

== Background ==
No Man's Art Gallery started as travelling pop-up gallery. Since then, the organization set up or planned pop-up art exhibitions in Rotterdam, Amsterdam, Hamburg, Mumbai, Paris, Copenhagen, Shanghai, Cape Town, Tehran and Mexico City. In 2016, No Man's Art became the first Dutch pop-up gallery to establish itself in Iran since the economic sanctions were lifted.

== Pop Up Gallery ==
Every couple of months the gallery organizes a pop-up gallery in a different metropole, exhibiting young artists from the host country as well as the artists that were found at previous destinations. The gallery takes pride in finding special locations for their galleries. Previous locations were:

- Rotterdam: A luxury flat for sale in Rotterdam-Kralingen.
- Amsterdam: Westerpark in Amsterdam. The art was exhibited on trees, for one night only during the Dutch annual Midwinter barbecue.
- Hamburg: Hasenmanufaktur at Hafentor 7, an old 1930s harbor building at Landungsbrücken, Hamburg.
- Mumbai: New Great Eastern Mills in Byculla. On the premises of an old mill compound, the visitors had to cross the magnificent ruins of the cotton mill to get to the gallery space facing a pond with turtles.
- Paris: 7 Rue Froissart. In the heart of Le Marais, the gallery got a hold of a wonderful 300m2 space.
- Copenhagen: No Man's Art did three exhibitions in Copenhagen. One in the Ignatius building in the Kødbyen area, one in a chapel on the Vestre Kirkegaard cemetery and one on the control tower on Knippelsbro.
- Tehran: There were two different pop-up venues in the city, one being in an uptown gallery space and the other being in an abandoned house.
- Mexico City: NMAG opened a pop-up gallery in a three floor residence in Santa Maria La Ribera, CDMX

== Slum Photography Contest ==
The No Man's Art Slum Photography Contest is an annual photography contest organized by No Man's Art Gallery in an underprivileged neighborhood in the world.

The first Slum Photography Contest was held in 2011 in Mumbai, India. 45 children from Dharavi, one of the biggest slums in the world, were given an analogue camera and two film rolls. The gallery teamed up with Acorn India Dharavi Project for a teenagers’ photography contest, and the winning picture was exhibited at the gallery from July 1–4, 2011. No Man's Art Gallery worked together with the NGO Acorn Foundation India and Artefacting Mumbai. Together they gave the children a workshop on how to use the camera, as many of the children had never used one before, then the kids were sent off to document the things in life they enjoyed the most.

All children received print outs of their film rolls, and the best ten children were exhibited among other young international artists at the No Man's Art Pop Up Gallery in Mumbai.

The pictures are now for sale and regularly exhibited at No Man's Art Gallery. The proceeds go to buying new film rolls for the children.
