= List of Old Bradfieldians =

This is a list of notable Old Bradfieldians, former pupils of Bradfield College in Berkshire, England. Alumni include three Victoria Cross winners, a Nobel Prize laureate, and senior members of government, including a former secretary of state for defence, and foreign secretary.

== Academics ==
- A.J. Arkell (1898–1980), archaeologist and colonial administrator, noted for work in Sudan and Egypt.
- Edward Armstrong (1846–1928), historian and pro-provost, Queen's College, Oxford
- William Ormston Backhouse (1885–1962), agricultural geneticist
- Peter B. Best (1939-2015), marine biologist and expert on whales and dolphins in Southern Africa
- Zachary Nugent Brooke (1883–1946), historian
- Arthur John Butler (1844–1910), scholar and professor of Italian language at University College London
- Edgar Frederick Carritt (1876–1964), philosopher, fellow of University College, Oxford, and member of the Carritt family
- Anthony Collett (1877–1929), author and writer of natural history
- Joseph Darracott (1934–1998), art historian and writer
- Peter Hadland Davis (1918–1992), British botanist
- Michael Devitt (born 1938), Australian philosopher
- Cyril Falls (1888–1971), military historian
- Edmund Fryde (1923–1999), historian of medieval England and the early renaissance
- Gerald Gazdar (born 1950), professor of computational linguistics at the University of Sussex
- Martin Gore (1951–2019), oncologist
- Basil Gray (1904–1989), British museum curator and art historian
- John Frederick Norman Green (1873–1949), geologist, Geological Society of London President, and winner of the Lyell Medal
- Richard Lancelyn Green (1953–2004), scholar of Arthur Conan Doyle and Sherlock Holmes
- Vivian H. H. Green (1915–2005), historian and rector of Lincoln College, Oxford
- Douglas Kell (born 1953), biochemist and chief executive of the Biotechnology and Biological Sciences Research Council
- Sir William Lawrence, 3rd Baronet (1870–1934), English horticulturalist
- Terence Mitchell (1929–2019), British museum curator
- Stephen Oakley (born 1958), classicist, academic
- John Prest (1928-2018), historian and horticulturalist
- Sir Martin Ryle (1918–1984), Astronomer Royal and 1974 Nobel Prize in Physics recipient.
- Martin Wight (1913–1972), historian and international affairs expert
- Walter Perceval Yetts (1878–1957), sinologist and surgeon

== Art and entertainment ==
- Sir Timothy Ackroyd (born 1958), actor and baronet
- Richard Adams (1920–2016), author
- Andrew Alexander, actor and singer
- Matt Barber (born 1983), actor
- John Bennett (1928–2005), actor
- Peter Boyle (born 1946), film editor, Academy Award and BAFTA nominee
- Anthony Calf (born 1960), actor
- Isabella Calthorpe (born 1980), model and actor
- James Chalmers, actor
- Sir Francis Cook, 4th Baronet (1907–1978), artist and fourth holder of the Cook Baronetcy
- Edward Gordon Craig (1872–1966), modernist theatre practitioner
- Louis de Bernières (born 1954), novelist
- Algernon Islay de Courcy Lyons (1922–1993), photographer, novelist, and linguist
- Simon Drew (born 1952), illustrator and cartoonist
- Sir Edmund Elton, 8th Baronet, inventor and studio potter
- John Etheridge, jazz guitarist
- Hubert J. Foss (1899–1953), composer and music publisher
- Sean Godley (born 1981), writer and poet
- John Hadfield (1907–1999), publisher and writer, best known for the 1959 novel Love on a Branch Line
- John Hamilton (1919–1993), British army officer and artist
- Tony Hancock (1924–1968), comedian
- Robin Hardy (1929–2016), director of The Wicker Man
- Misan Harriman (born 1977), photographer and founder of What We Seee
- Anthony Hawtrey (1909–1954), actor and theatre director
- Thomas Heathcote (1917–1986), character actor
- William Henry Helm (1860–1936), writer of non-fiction books
- Philip Henderson (1906–1977), novelist and literary critic
- Thomas Hennell (1903–1945), artist
- John Hollingsworth (1916–1963), orchestral conductor
- Jolyon Jackson (1948–1985) musician and composer
- Sshh Liguz (born 1984), artist and singer
- Russell Lloyd, British film editor
- David Lloyd Jones (born 1942), architect
- Bertram Luard-Selby (1953-2018), composer and cathedral organist
- Christopher Sclater Millard (1872–1927), author
- Hilary Minster (1944–1999), actor in 'Allo 'Allo!
- John Llewellyn Moxey (1925-2019), film and television director
- Alistair Petrie (born 1970), English actor
- Terence Reese (1913–1996), bridge player and writer
- Alec Robertson (1892–1982), writer, broadcaster and music critic
- Digby Rumsey (born 1952), film director, producer, writer, cinematographer, editor, sound recordist and film diarist
- Gerald Savory (1909–1996), writer and television producer
- Arthur Scaife (1855–1934), writer, editor, insurance broker, and founder of The Province
- Darja Schabad (born 1983), Russian vocalist and actress
- John Oldrid Scott (1841–1913), architect
- George Blackall Simonds (1843–1929), sculptor
- Christopher Steel (1938–1991), classical music composer
- Dan Stein (born 1977), DJ Fresh
- William Strang (1859–1921), painter and engraver
- Brian Thomas (1912–1989), church artist known in particular for stained glass and mural
- Sam Thompson (born 1992), television personality and radio presenter
- Riley Uggla (born 1995), creative director and designer
- Snoo Wilson (1948–2013), playwright, screenwriter and director
- George Grey Wornum (1888–1957), architect

== Broadcasters ==
- Nick Clarke (1948–2006), journalist and BBC Radio 4 presenter
- Christopher Edward de Souza (born 1943), broadcaster, teacher, music director, composer, opera producer and author
- Tim Dellor (born 1975), BBC Local Radio presenter
- Ben Geoghegan (born 1965), BBC News presenter and correspondent
- Nick Higham (born 1954), BBC News correspondent
- Peter Jones (1930–1990), broadcaster
- Will Lyons (born 1976), journalist, broadcaster and wine writer
- Neil Manthorp, writer and broadcaster known for cricket coverage
- Jonny Saunders (born 1975), former BBC sports commentator

== Diplomats and civil servants ==
- Leslie Glass (1911–1988), diplomat and former high commissioner to Nigeria
- Sir William Rupert Hay (1893–1962), colonial administrator and army officer in British India
- Stephen Holmes (1896–1980), diplomat and former high commissioner of the United Kingdom to Australia
- Morrice James, Baron Saint Brides (1916–1989), High Commissioner in Pakistan, India and Australia
- G. Norman Knight (1891–1978), civil servant and indexer
- Peter Mathers (born 1946), diplomat and former high commissioner to Jamaica
- George Paine (1918–1992), Registrar General
- Leonard William Reynolds (1874–1946), colonial administrator in British India
- Gerald Henry Summers (1885–1925), British colonial administrator
- R. V. Vernède (1905–2003), colonial administrator in India and writer
- Gordon Wetherell (born 1948), diplomat and former governor of the Turks and Caicos Islands
- Dennis Charles White KBE CMG (1910–1983), British colonial administrator in Sarawak and first high commissioner for Brunei
- Ronald Wingate (1889–1978), colonial administrator, soldier, delegate on the Tripartite Commission for the Restitution of Monetary Gold and author

== Law ==
- Quentin Edwards QC (1925–2010), judge
- Sir Richard Henriques (born 1943), judge and Justice of the High Court of England and Wales
- Nicholas Hilliard (born 1959), Recorder of London and senior judge at the Old Bailey
- Sir Anthony Tristram Kenneth May KC (1940-2024), judge and former President of the Queen's Bench Division
- Walter Merricks, English solicitor who has held a number of positions at public institutions
- The Hon Alan Robertson AM SC (born 1950), former judge of the Federal Court of Australia

== Medical ==
- Bryan Nicholson Brooke (1915–1998), surgeon and pioneer of ulcerative colitis surgery
- John Hopewell (1920-2015), urologist and pioneering kidney surgeon
- Reginald Statham (1884–1959), gynaecologist and army officer

== Naval and military ==
- Captain Sir Hubert Acland, 4th Baronet Acland (1890–1976), officer in the Royal Navy
- Major-general Arthur Edward Barstow (1888–1942), officer in the British Indian Army and commander of the 9th Infantry Division during the Battle of Malaya
- Vice Admiral Sir Jeremy Blackham (born 1943), Royal Navy officer who served as Deputy Commander in Chief Fleet
- Brigadier Mike Calvert (1913–1998), Chindits and Special Air Service commander
- Air Chief Marshal Sir Christopher Courtney (1890–1976), Royal Air Force officer
- Vice Admiral Richard Bell Davies VC (1886–1966), Royal Navy officer and aviator
- William Robert Aufrère Dawson (1891–1918), commanding officer of the 6th battalion, Queen's Own Royal West Kent Regiment and recipient of DSO with Three Bars
- Flight Lieutenant Philip Ensor (1920–1941), flying ace of the Royal Air Force during the Second World War
- Lieutenant General Sir John Foley, (born 1939), Senior British Army officer, Commander British Forces in Hong Kong, Chief of Defence Intelligence, Director SAS
- Admiral of the Fleet Bruce Fraser, Baron Fraser of North Cape (1888–1981), Chief of the Naval Staff
- Air Chief Marshal Sir Guy Garrod (1891–1965), Royal Air Force officer
- Admiral John Henry Godfrey, Admiral in the Royal Navy and Royal Indian Navy
- Colonel Mark Nicholas Gray (born 1966), decorated Royal Marines officer
- Air Chief Marshal Sir Roderic Hill MC (1894–1954), Royal Air Force officer, vice chancellor of the University of London
- Brigadier-general Alan Hinde CMG (1876–1950), British Army officer (Royal Artillery)
- Marshal of the Royal Air Force Sir Andrew Humphrey (1921–1977), Chief of the Air Staff and Chief of the Defence Staff
- General Sir Peter Leng (1925–2009), British Army officer and Master-general of the Ordnance
- Lieutenant General Hugh Massy (1884–1965), British Army general during World War II
- Lieutenant-general George Molesworth CSI CBE (1890–1968), Deputy Chief of General Staff of Army Headquarters India and later Military Secretary to the India Office
- Admiral SirArthur Palliser (1890–1956), Royal Navy officer during World War I
- Air Vice-Marshal Sir Richard Peirse (1931–2014), Royal Air Force officer who served as Defence Services Secretary
- Major-general Michael Scott (born 1941), British Army officer and Military Secretary
- Geoffrey Saxton White (1886–1918), Victoria Cross recipient
- Major-general Dudley Graham Johnson (1884–1975), Victoria Cross recipient
- Major-general Peter Raymond Leuchars (1921-2009), Welsh Guards officer
- Major-general Sir Donald McMullen (1891–1967), Royal Engineers officer and director general of transportation at the War Office from 1941 to 1945
- Anthony Boam (1932-2023), British Army officer and Commander of British Forces in Hong Kong from 1987 to 1989
- Gerald Henry Summers (1885–1925), British Army officer and colonial administrator
- Dominick Stuart "Toby" Graham (1920-2013), British Army officer, cross-country Olympic skier and university professor
- Brigadier-general Norman W. Webber (1881–1950), senior British Army officer during World War I
- Rear Admiral Sir Patrick Macnamara (1886–1957), senior Royal Navy officer during World War II
- Admiral Sir Francis Powell (1849–1927), senior Royal Navy officer and commander-in-charge at Hong Kong during the Boxer Rebellion

== Other ==
- Benedict Allen (born 1960), explorer
- Henry Besant (1972–2013), co-creator of Olmeca Tequila
- Alastair Boyd, 7th Baron Kilmarnock (1927–2009)
- Anthony Collett, journalist, nature writer and sometime governor
- Sir William Lawrence, 4th Baronet
- H. Pelham Lee (1877–1953), internal combustion engine pioneer and founder of the Coventry Climax Engines company
- Hugh Osmond (born 1962), businessman, entrepreneur, and founder of Punch Taverns
- Paul Myers (1932-2015), classical record producer
- Dan Robinson, (runner)
- Donald Macintyre, journalist, political editor and foreign correspondent
- Major Michael Ingouville Williams (born 1946), Army Major and former Lord Lieutenant of East Lothian
- Dennis White (1910–1983), British colonial administrator and former high commissioner to Brunei
- Philip Norton Banks (1889–1964), British Colonial Inspector General of Police in Ceylon
- Robert Winder, former literary editor of The Independent
- Miles Hadfield (1903–1982), writer, illustrator, and pioneering gardener
- Stephen Coleridge (1854–1936), author, barrister, opponent of vivisection, and co-founder of the National Society for the Prevention of Cruelty to Children
- Richard Tait (born 1947), journalist and former member of the BBC Trust
- Frederick Leney (1876–1921), brewery executive and cricketer
- Henry Hayman (1853–1941), freemason, clergyman and cricketer
- Owen Slot, sports journalist for The Times

== Politics ==
- Peter Ainsworth (1956–2021), Conservative former Member of Parliament for East Surrey and member of the Shadow Cabinet
- Richard Benyon (born 1960), former Conservative Member of Parliament for Newbury
- Sir Dennis Boles, 1st Baronet (1861–1935), British Conservative politician
- Sir Reginald Brade (1864–1933), Under-Secretary of State for War, 1914–1920; Gentleman Usher to the Sword of State
- Sir Michael Marshall (1930–2006), former Conservative Member of Parliament for Arundel
- Stephen Milligan (1948–1994), former Conservative MP and journalist
- Sir John Nott (born 1932), Secretary of State for Defence
- David Owen, Baron Owen (born 1938), Foreign Secretary and co-founder of the SDP
- Robert Henry Pooley (1878 - 1954), lawyer and political figure in British Columbia
- Martin Stevens (1929–1986), British Conservative Party politician
- Charles Tannock (born 1957), Conservative Member of the European Parliament
- Sir Cyril Townsend (1937-2013), politician
- Henry Usborne (1909–1996), British Member of Parliament
- Harold Russell (1871–1938), New Zealand politician, farmer and sportsman

== Religion ==
- Charles Aylen (1882–1972), Anglican bishop
- Russell Barry (1890–1976), former Anglican bishop of Southwell
- Edward Bidwell (1866–1941), former bishop of Ontario
- Claude Blagden (1874–1952), former Anglican bishop of Peterborough
- Michael Coleman (1902–1969), Anglican bishop
- Cecil Cooper (1884–1964), fourth bishop in Korea
- John Drury (born 1936), former dean of Christ Church, Oxford and chaplain of All Souls College, Oxford
- Michael Hare Duke (1924–2014), author and former bishop of St Andrews, Dunkeld and Dunblane
- Eric Hamilton (1890–1962), Anglican bishop
- George Jeudwine (1849–1933), Anglican priest and Fellow of The Queen's College, Oxford
- Archibald Robertson (1853–1931), principal of King's College London and Bishop of Exeter
- Michael Scott-Joynt (1943–2014), Bishop of Winchester
- Cecil Tyndale-Biscoe (1863–1949), missionary in Kashmir
- Harold Costley-White (1878–1966), Anglican dean, author and teacher
- Benedict Hoskyns (1856–1935), Anglican priest
- Robert Streatfeild (1894–1976), Dean of Nassau
- Rob Martin (born 1949), Bishop in the Anglican Church of Kenya
- Charles Lefroy (–1940), Anglican priest in Perth, Western Australia from 1907 to 1912

== Royalty ==
- Ronald Muwenda Mutebi II (born 1955), current King of Buganda
- Faiq Bolkiah (born 1998), Bruneian footballer and family member of the Sultan of Brunei

== Sport ==
- Gus Atkinson (born 1998), Surrey and England cricketer
- Lauren Bell (born 2001), England cricketer
- Ben Brocklehurst (1922–2007), English cricketer
- Harry Came (born 1998), Derbyshire cricketer
- Dai Wai Tsun (born 1999), Hong Kong footballer
- Hugo Darby (born 1993), English cricketer
- Nico de Boinville (born 1989), National Hunt and Gold Cup-winning jockey
- Charles Ashpitel Denton (1852–1932), English amateur footballer and solicitor
- Bernard Elgood (1922–1997), English cricketer
- Robert Fetherstonhaugh (born 1932), former English cricketer
- Sheridon Gumbs (born 2004), Surrey & England Under-19 cricketer
- Ollie Hancock (born 1987), British racing driver
- Sam Hancock (born 1980), British racing driver
- Ryan Higgins (born 1995), Middlesex & England Under-19 cricketer
- Frederick Hill (1847–1913), English cricketer
- Alan Hinde (1876–1950), English cricketer
- Henry Jollye (1841–1902), English cricketer
- Zach Lion-Cachet (born 2003), Sussex & Netherlands cricketer
- Christopher Ling (1880–1953), English cricketer
- Okeover Longcroft (1850–1871), English cricketer
- Michael Mence (1944–2014), English cricketer
- Marco Micaletto (born 1996), Italian footballer
- Harrison Newey (born 1998), British racing driver
- Mark Nicholas (born 1957), Hampshire cricketer and TV presenter
- Hamza Riazuddin (born 1989), English cricketer
- Graham Roope (1946–2006), Surrey and England cricketer
- Brian Stevens (born 1942), English cricketer
- Hugh Tapsfield (1870–1945), English cricketer
- Sidney Wace (1882–1966), English cricketer
- Rupert Cox (born 1967), English cricketer
- Peter Smith (1944-2024), English cricketer and headmaster
- Robert Drummond Balfour (1844–1915), English cricketer
- Henry Joynt (born 1931), English cricketer
- Saffie Osborne (born 2002), British jockey
- John Monck (1845–1929), New Zealand cricketer
- William Kendall (born 1973), English cricketer
- Jacob Roddy (born 2003), English footballer
- Hugh Bennett (1862–1943), English cricketer
