= Herbert Gray =

Herbert Gray may refer to:

- Herbert Gray (Irish priest), Archdeacon of Leighlin
- Herbert Branston Gray, English clergyman and schoolmaster
- Herb Gray, Canadian politician
- Herb Gray (Canadian football)
