= Vernède =

Vernède may refer to:

- R. E. Vernède
- R. V. Vernède
