= Anthony Chenevix-Trench =

English college headmaster (1919–1979)

- Born: 10 May 1919; Kasauli, British Raj
- Died: 21 June 1979 (aged 60); Fettes College, Edinburgh, Scotland
- Occupation: Schoolmaster
- Known for: Headmaster of Bradfield College, Eton College and Fettes College

Anthony Chenevix-Trench (10 May 1919 – 21 June 1979) was a British schoolteacher, classics scholar and alleged child sexual abuser. He was born in British India, educated at Shrewsbury School and Christ Church, Oxford, and served in the Second World War as an artillery officer with British Indian units in Malaya. Captured by the Japanese in Singapore, he was forced to work on the Burma Railway.

He taught classics at Shrewsbury, where he became a housemaster, and taught for another year at Christ Church. He was headmaster of Bradfield College, where he raised academic standards and instituted a substantial programme of new building works. Appointed headmaster of Eton College in 1963, he broadened the curriculum immensely and introduced a greater focus on achieving strong examination results, but was asked to leave in 1969 after disagreements with housemasters and an unpopular attitude to caning, which became the subject of a press controversy after his death.

Following a one-year break during which he taught for one term at the prep school Swanbourne House, he was appointed headmaster of Fettes College, where he succeeded in greatly increasing enrolment and in reforming the harsh traditional atmosphere of the school. He died while still headmaster there.

He is the subject of child sexual abuse allegations detailed in numerous articles and an episode of the BBC radio documentary series In Dark Corners by Alex Renton.

== Early life and family ==
Anthony Chenevix-Trench, born at Kasauli in India on 10 May 1919, was the youngest of four sons, the older ones being Christopher, Richard and Godfrey. His father was in the Indian Civil Service. In the first few years of his life the family visited Britain and other countries, returning to India in 1922 where his father worked as part of a three-man commission in the picturesque city of Udaipur making recommendations on the vexed issue of land reform in the Rajput state of Mewar. Anthony was to spend three years in India, living in traditional colonial luxury with a staff of twelve including an English nanny and an Indian ayah, riding with the Mewar state cavalry on his pony while wearing a lancer's uniform tailored down to his size, and moving to the foothills of the Himalayas to avoid the heat of the summer.

== Education ==
The family returned to England in 1925, moving to Somerset in 1927; Chenevix-Trench attended school for the first time in Westgate-on-Sea in Kent. He had already been introduced to classical literature by his father, reading Herodotus at the age of six. His mother Margaret would always read to the children – who by now included all four brothers and Philippa Tooth whom the Chenevix-Trenches looked after while her parents remained in India – at bedtime, including G. K. Chesterton, Kipling, and Greek and Roman myths. Towards the end of his life Chenevix-Trench described how this had inspired him, and said that "the words still sing in my mind like music".

At age eight he was sent to board at the prep school Highfield in Hampshire, where the headmaster Canon W.R. Mills was described as "a hard taskmaster in Latin". Chenevix-Trench was a contemporary there of Ludovic Kennedy, whom he helped with Greek prose composition, Anthony Storr and Robin Maugham; all three of these were later scathing of the headmaster's extensive use of the cane on his young charges. In his early years there, Chenevix-Trench spent more than a year away from the school due to lung congestion, suspected rheumatic fever, and problems with sleepwalking. But he quickly resumed progress, writing prose and poetry described as "highly polished" for the school magazine, and being successful at boxing, though he was too small to excel at most of the team sports. He was popular through sheer enthusiasm rather than physical prowess, and in his penultimate year founded an unofficial school club in which boys would crawl about in the school's lofts in their pyjamas – the subsequent myth was that he fell through the headmaster's own ceiling and was thoroughly caned on the spot. Despite all this, Chenevix-Trench won a scholarship to Shrewsbury School while still aged twelve, and was a prefect in his last term at Highfield.

At Shrewsbury at the time, H.H. Hardy was headmaster, described as a "strict disciplinarian" who maintained the school's "rich Classical tradition, sporting fanaticism, fervent house loyalties, robust discipline and unseemly squalor". Chenevix-Trench was small for his age, but charmed both teachers and other pupils with his wit and enthusiasm, took part in a wide variety of sports, and continued to excel academically, winning a host of prizes. He became a house monitor at age sixteen, and head of School House the following year. Francis King, who was a thirteen-year-old in his first year at the school at the time, described Chenevix-Trench as "a supercilious, capricious and cruel head of house". The majority did not share this view, and Robin Lorimer, Chenevix-Trench's best friend at Shrewsbury, observed that Chenevix-Trench was merely upholding a rule then in force that even the most trivial mistakes by younger boys must be punished with four strokes of the cane by the monitors, but did not gloat over the effects. By this time Chenevix-Trench had already gained a Classics Scholarship to Christ Church, Oxford, at age sixteen.

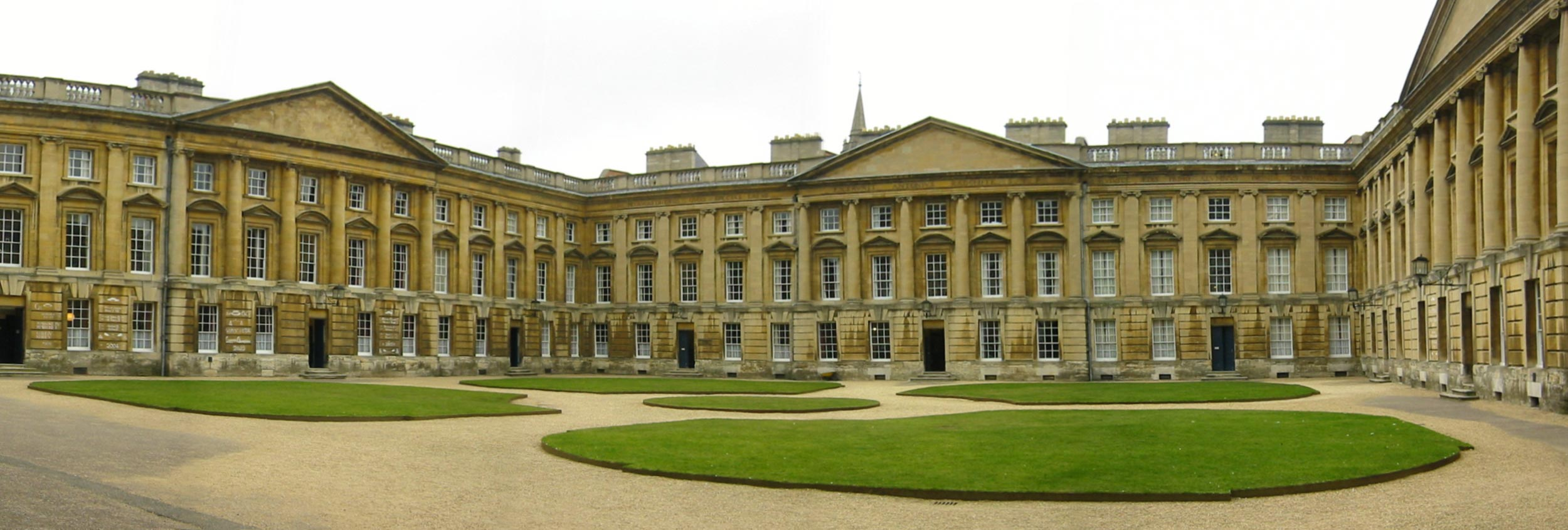
Winning an academic scholarship of £100 a year to support himself at Christ Church, Chenevix-Trench was housed in Peckwater Quad for his first two years there.

He was housed in Peckwater Quad, and rowed in the college's Second VIII. He greatly appreciated his surroundings, writing home that "Oxford in sunshine is a dream city – made to be seen in summer". He was elected to the Twenty Club, an exclusive Christ Church debating society, but he did not join the Oxford Union or the Oxford University Dramatic Society, for reasons of cost and time commitments respectively. His tutors for Honour Moderations were Denys Page and John G. Barrington-Ward, said to be "one of the best Latin prose scholars in Oxford", who was also a crossword setter for The Times. Chenevix-Trench twice narrowly failed to win the coveted Hertford Prize for classicists, but in Mods he achieved twelve alpha grades out of fourteen papers, resulting in an easy First-class in Latin and Greek literature. Before his third year at Oxford began, the Second World War broke out, and Chenevix-Trench signed up for the Royal Regiment of Artillery (believing it likely to be more cerebral than an infantry command)—his oath was witnessed by Hugh Trevor-Roper.

== Military service ==
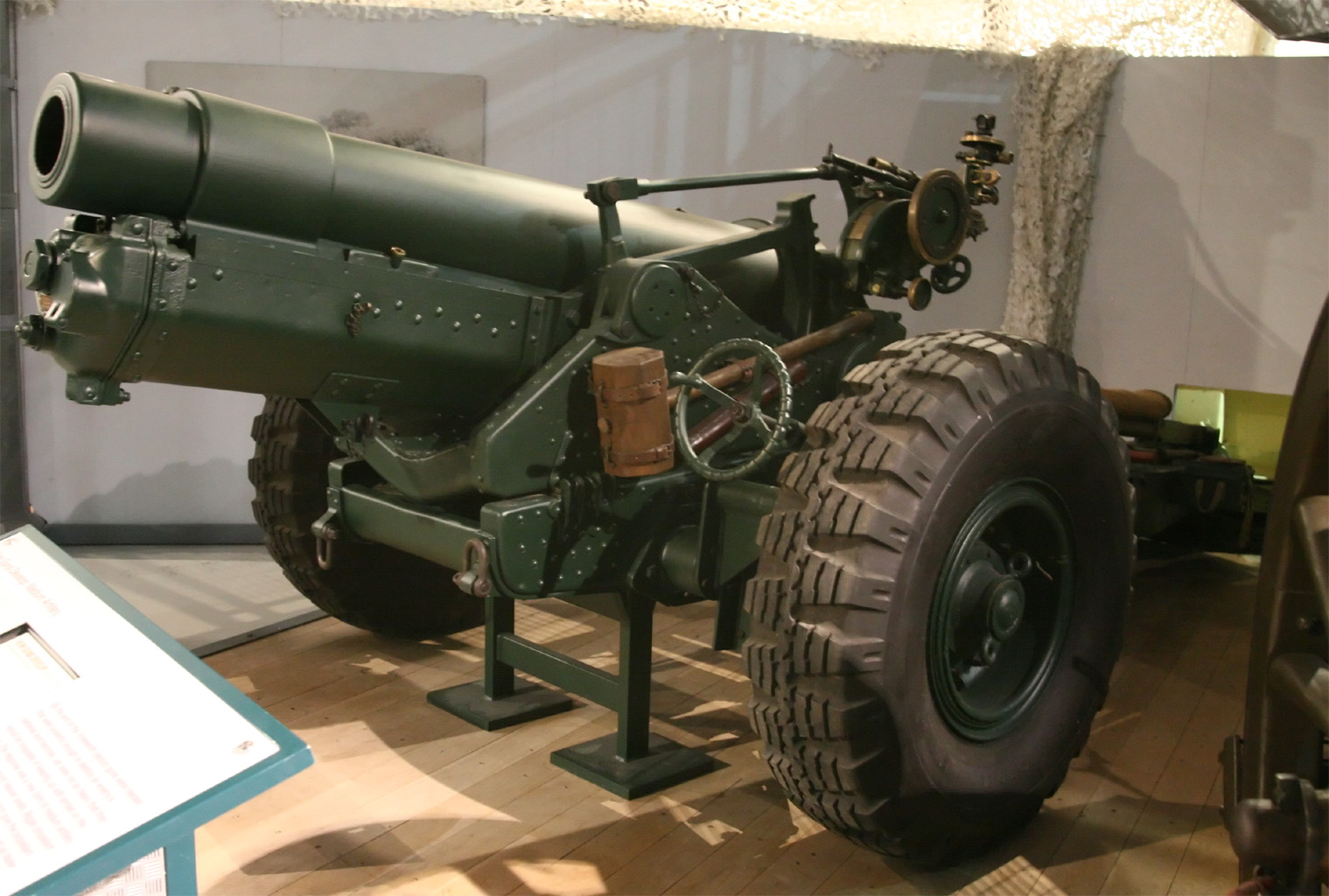
Chenevix-Trench's artillery battery was equipped with 6-inch howitzers, which proved cumbersome in the thick jungle.

Chenevix-Trench started his military career as an officer cadet at Aldershot, taking the technical and organisational teaching seriously but the remainder less so: "In these pre-Dunkirk days, work finished at five o'clock and everyone went home for the weekend." On 1 March 1940, he was commissioned as a second lieutenant. When volunteers were requested to be replacement officers for artillery units in India, he stepped forward, remembering his happy childhood days there. In Bombay, he joined the 22nd Mountain (Indian Artillery) Regiment, and took charge of an artillery battery. His linguistic skills were immensely valuable in overcoming poor communications within the unit (he mastered the basics of Urdu to make it possible for the officers to communicate with their men), though the culturally diverse nature of the unit, half Muslim and half Sikh but with British officers and signallers, continued to cause problems.

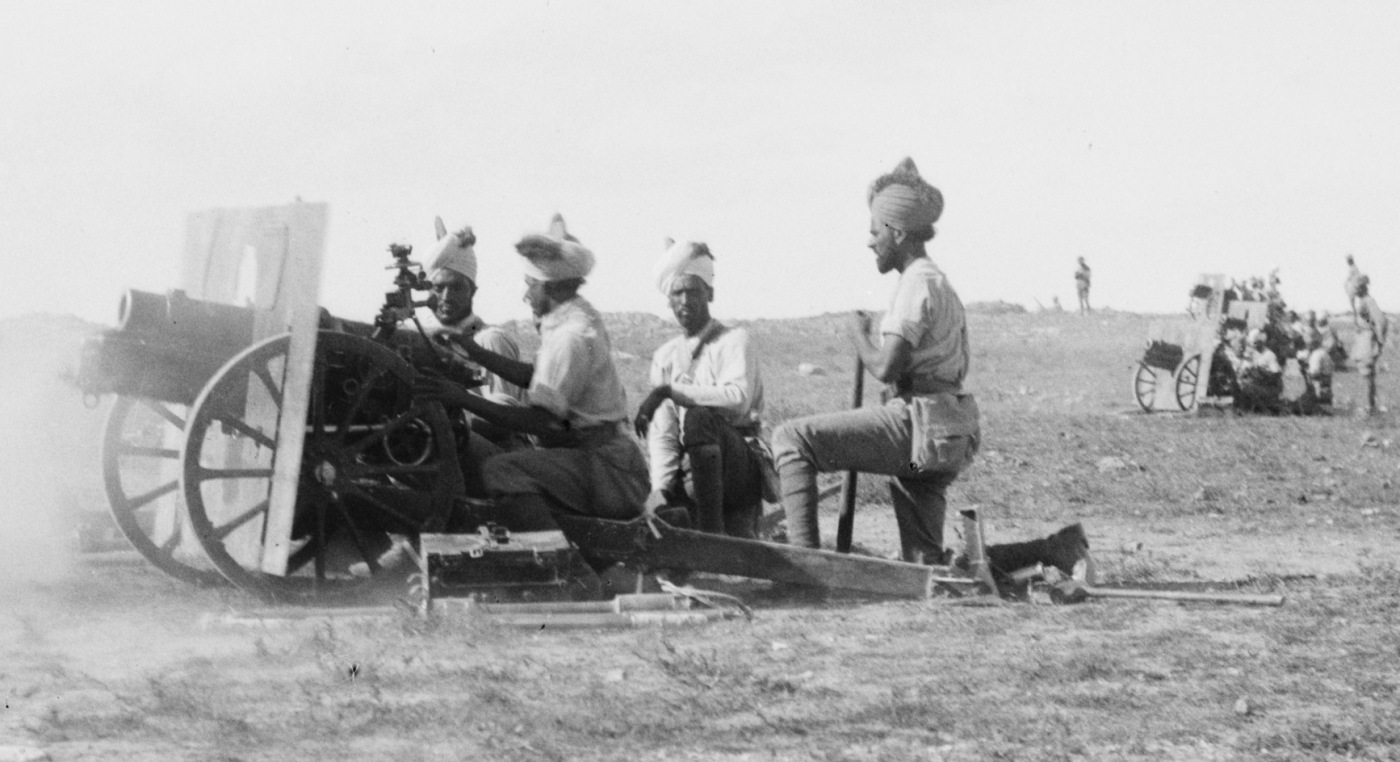
The battery received two smaller 3.7-inch mountain howitzers when some of the 6-inch guns were captured by the Japanese during the chaotic retreat through Malaya.

The regiment, made up of four batteries, was stationed in Singapore, the most important British naval base in the Far East. Each battery was made up of 180 men with four British officers; Chenevix-Trench's battery was the 24th (Hazara) Mountain Battery, which had recently been re-equipped with 6-inch howitzers. By the time Japan attacked Malaya in early December 1941, Chenevix-Trench had been promoted to battery captain, and the battery was hundreds of miles further north in Jitra near the Malayan border with Siam, supporting the 11th Indian Division in defence of the Alor Star airfield. They were soon forced to withdraw in the face of the Japanese offensive, and then became part of the general retreat southwards through Malaya as the British forces risked being outflanked by Japanese amphibious landings. Massive Japanese air superiority put an end to the British naval counter-strike by sinking the battleship HMS Prince of Wales and the battlecruiser HMS Repulse, which had been sent to attack the Japanese transport ships.

The battery commander, Edward Sawyer, described Chenevix-Trench as having been "a tower of strength" in the rearguard action. By 26 December, the unit was fighting at Kampar, halfway back to Singapore. Chenevix-Trench was further praised for his battery's role in defeating the first Japanese amphibious landings at Kuala Selangor, but the retreat continued, and by the end of January 1942 the regiment was back in Singapore, supporting the 28th Indian Infantry Brigade in its defence of a sector of the island's shore west of the causeway linking it to the mainland. The 85,000 British and Commonwealth troops in Singapore surrendered on 15 February. One of the Sikh artillerymen in Chenevix-Trench's unit was not much impressed by the physical appearance of the Japanese, asking, "Sahib, how came we to be beaten by those bastards?"

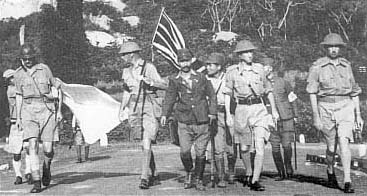
The British surrender at Singapore was the largest surrender of British-led forces in history.

Chenevix-Trench was a prisoner of war (POW) for three and a half years, first at Changi Prison and then working on the Burma Railway, where he lost an eye and suffered kidney failure. The twenty-four British officers and signallers were separated from their Indian troops – whom the Japanese had hopes of subverting to their cause – and initially lived in fairly tolerable conditions. Chenevix-Trench learned more about India's ethnic and political divisions, read Homer's Odyssey in Greek and Kant's Critique of Pure Reason, and compiled, bound and decorated an anthology of English poetry. Conditions changed in April 1943 when the POWs were used as slave labour on the railway. The track had to be forced through impenetrable jungle, in appalling conditions and with malaria, dysentery and beriberi constant: Chenevix-Trench suffered all three. Medical supplies were non-existent, rations at starvation level, and the sick forced to work until they died. Chenevix-Trench saved many lives through inspired pseudo-medical advice and hygiene discipline. He saw one of his fellow soldiers impaled against a tree with bayonets for attempting to escape, amidst many other horrors. When a cholera epidemic struck, the British did not have enough fuel to build funeral pyres for the victims, so were forced to bury them in shallow graves. Heavy rains came and washed away the soil from over the graves, and one morning Chenevix-Trench and his fellow prisoners emerged from their camp amidst rows of protruding bones clad with rotting flesh.

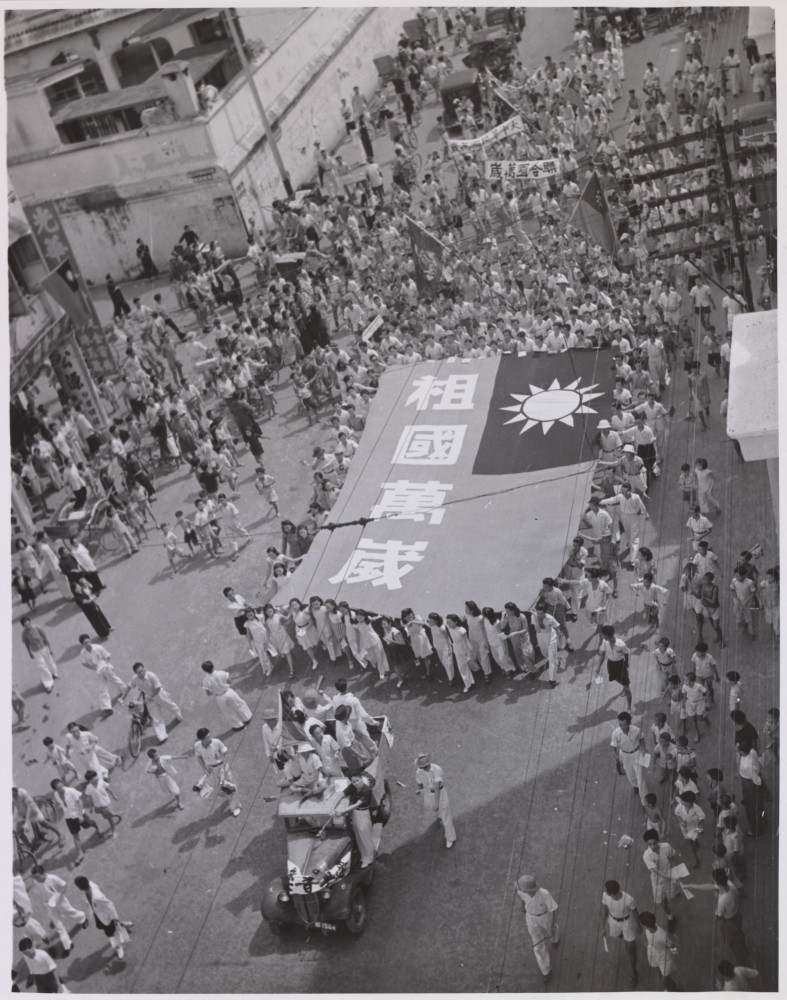
Chenevix-Trench observed the huge celebrations of the local population when British forces liberated Singapore.

Despite it all, he kept up his classical studies, and gave talks to his fellow prisoners about Greek literature. He was also remembered as a man who took mortal risks to barter for the food that might keep men alive a few days longer. For his parents, almost all of 1942 passed without a word, before learning by an official telegram that he was a prisoner of war; they continued a constant stream of letters, most of which reached him and gave him great comfort, even though his postcards in the opposite direction were censored or injected with random text like "tell Susan not to worry". Susan was fictitious, but by 1944 she did indeed not need to worry about him; with the railway completed, he was back in Singapore, with enough leisure to learn both Persian and Mandarin, as well as "cooking, gardening, bridge and poker". Thus, with the added inconvenience of starvation rations once again, he lived out the rest of his war.

Chenevix-Trench described how the population of Singapore was "crazy with joy and showed it" when British troops arrived to take back control of the city after the Japanese surrender. His brother Godfrey was serving as navigating officer on HMS Cleopatra, the first ship into Singapore, and the two were reunited the same day. Chenevix-Trench was also reunited with his Indian troops, and took the unusual decision that "after all my men have been through and their magnificent behaviour under shootings, beatings, and starving by enemy propagandists, I feel the least I can do to thank them is to see them all happily home to their villages". He therefore returned to England via India, only reaching home on 29 October 1945.

== Return to Oxford ==
Chenevix-Trench returned to Oxford in 1946 to complete his degree. He was elected President of the Christ Church Junior Common Room towards the end of that year, was involved in reviving the college's Boat Club, and was "the life and soul of the gathering" at many social functions. He was taught by R. H. Dundas, Eric Gray, Gilbert Ryle, Jim Urmson and Maurice Foster. He won the prestigious Slade Exhibition in 1947, and then achieved the remarkable feat of gaining an alpha in every single paper in Greats. In his final year, he had done some classics teaching back at Shrewsbury School when several classics teachers fell ill, and his enjoyment of it decided him on teaching as a career, with plans to become a headmaster one day. With offers to teach at Christ Church, Eton and Shrewsbury, he eventually chose Shrewsbury, and began teaching classics there in January 1948.

== Teaching career ==
=== Shrewsbury and Oxford ===
At Shrewsbury Chenevix-Trench's philosophy was that he preferred that "the majority of boys kept the rules most of the time rather than one which stifled individual vitality". His lessons with the younger years also had a system of punishments and bribes: excellent work might receive a shilling or half crown reward at his own expense, while a major mistake in written work would be marked by a picture of a crab – more than three crab images would result in the boy receiving corporal punishment in the privacy of Chenevix-Trench's study. With the older years he introduced textual criticism, philosophy and history to give greater insight into the classical texts than conventional teaching of the time allowed. He would also regularly tutor older boys individually – with alcoholic refreshments on hand – and occasionally permitted his proximity in age to encourage excess humour, as when he let slip to some of the sixth form that a visiting speaker, Reverend Hoskyns-Abrahall, had been known to Chenevix-Trench in his own schooldays as "Foreskin-rubberballs".

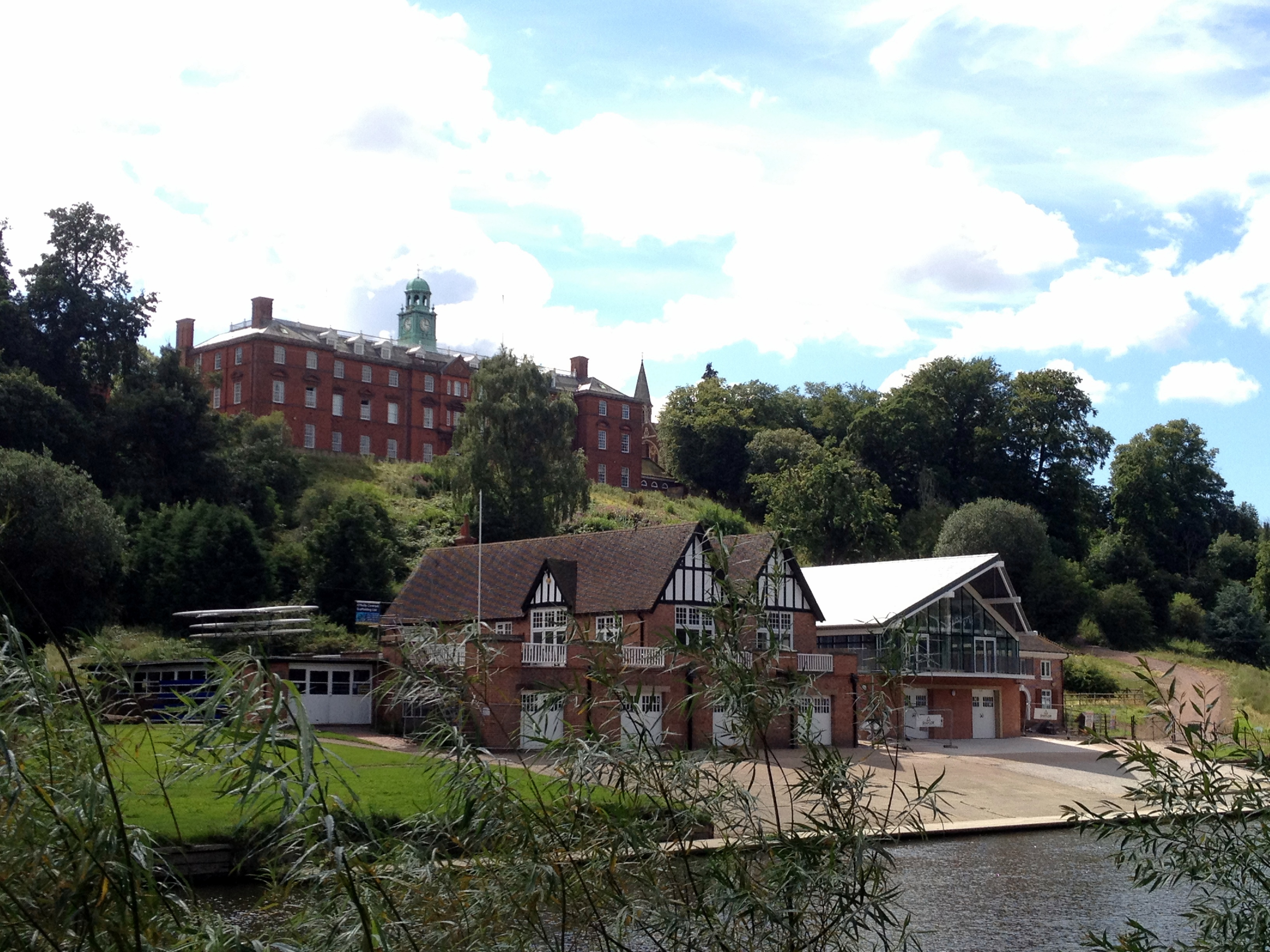
Chenevix-Trench was involved in coaching rowing – in which Shrewsbury School had a strong tradition – both as assistant master and as housemaster.

Chenevix-Trench also served as an officer in the school's Combined Cadet Force, as a coach for rowing crews, and as an organiser of "holiday camps for underprivileged children in Shrewsbury". On school ski trips to Switzerland he would make up for his lack of skill at the sport by instigating "ferocious snowball fights", and abusing his linguistic skills in talking to other skiers, "talking a kind of German to the French, which they then disliked, French to the Americans, which they didn't understand, and Urdu to the Swiss, who were more than puzzled." In September 1948, he was promoted to the position of house tutor of School House, a role he relished as he took a keen interest in assisting boys with their academic work – both by practical advice and by once again instituting a system of corporal punishment for specific numbers of errors – and also in indulging the "juvenile tomfoolery" of his teenage charges.

In 1950, Chenevix-Trench was persuaded to accept the position of tutor for Classical Honour Moderations back at Christ Church. He took up the position in October 1951, but, despite the importance of the post, and the persuasive arguments that only at Oxford could his academic talents truly shine, he found the undergraduates lacking in enthusiasm, and the life of an Oxford tutor to be more detached from his students than he preferred. In February 1952, George Turner, the headmaster of Charterhouse, who was about to retire, wrote to Chenevix-Trench insisting he apply for the job, and Geoffrey Fisher, Archbishop of Canterbury and chairman of the Charterhouse governors, visited him in person to urge him to do so. Soon considered the favourite, despite pressure from Christ Church not to leave, Chenevix-Trench caused chaos by first submitting his candidacy, then withdrawing it after Tom Taylor, housemaster of School House back at Shrewsbury, died suddenly in the post and he was offered the job. Loyalty to his old school and house won out over both the remarkable opportunity of being headmaster of a major public school at age 32 and his academic responsibility at Christ Church, and Chenevix-Trench accepted the promotion at Shrewsbury, despite great distress at the conflict of loyalties. From Christ Church, Roy Harrod wrote that "There is something about the way this has been done that shocks me. I have a terribly strong sense that it is wrong". At Shrewsbury there was delight at his taking the job, and a "pandaemonium of excited and happy chattering" among the boys of School House when they were told. Chenevix-Trench took up his new post in September.

In November 1952, Chenevix-Trench spoke with Michael Hoban in opposition to a motion at the school Debating Society, proposed by the old boys and then Oxford undergraduates Michael Heseltine and Julian Critchley, that "This House Deplores the Public School System". Both the proposers poked fun at Chenevix-Trench's proclivity towards corporal punishment, and he defended the practice by suggesting that the alternatives had their own problems. The motion was carried by 105 votes to 95, and the tabloid newspapers made a great story from the outcome. Chenevix-Trench did not change his approach, nor did he object to the continuation of the tradition of fagging, nor that of older boys having the right to use corporal punishment on younger boys. In addition to his added organisational responsibilities as housemaster, he also continued both his close academic tutoring and carefree informality with the boys of School House. On 15 August 1953, he married Elizabeth Spicer, a primary school teacher whose brother he had known at Oxford. She took over some of the organisational work in School House, resulting in reports from the boys of great improvements in the quality of the food. Elizabeth gave birth to twin daughters, Laura and Jo, in October 1955. The couple's two sons, Richard and Jonathan, were born after he left Shrewsbury.

=== Bradfield College ===
In January 1955, Chenevix-Trench agreed to be interviewed for the position of headmaster at Bradfield College, who were eager to find a younger replacement for John Hills, and were impressed by Chenevix-Trench's academic credentials. He got the job and left Shrewsbury with great regret. At Bradfield he continued his insistence on informality, regularly associating with the boys in their leisure time to relate his many anecdotes, and learning every boy's Christian name. He also abolished an ancient tradition whereby the entry of the headmaster to the most revered event (a play in ancient Greek performed once every three years) was heralded with a trumpet fanfare. He was successful in re-establishing close links with prep schools, which were vital for maintaining a flow of academically able boys to join the school and increase its numbers. He also charmed parents, of both existing and prospective pupils, lavishing great attention on them. As a disciplinarian he could be forgiving and open-minded: Richard Henriques was sent to him by the school chaplain to be punished for asking a controversial question about religion, but Chenevix-Trench dismissed the problem.

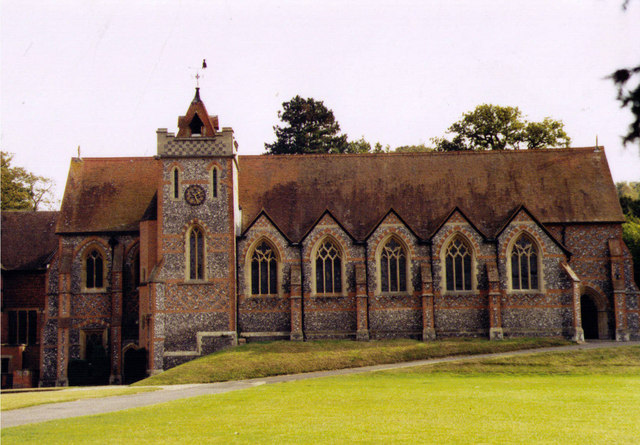
Bradfield College's chapel hosted many inspired sermons by Chenevix-Trench, but also some occasions where his nerves, shattered by his wartime experiences, failed him.

He relaxed some uniform rules, but maintained rules that he felt reinforced school spirit, such as boys being required to attend inter-school sports fixtures as spectators. As at Shrewsbury, he did not abolish fagging or the rights of older boys to beat younger boys, but at Bradfield he reduced both. Even after his minor reforms, new boys were still caned by prefects for "talking after lights out", "misbehaviour in the dining hall", "insolence to a prefect", and similar transgressions. The prefects themselves sometimes fell victim to Chenevix-Trench's harsher rules, though: he expelled the Head of School (head boy) for smoking on school transport after an official sports fixture. Other aspects of his approach were more controversial, even for the times. Chenevix-Trench's biographer, Mark Peel, stated that "although Tony's efforts to rid the school of homosexuality by engaging in a massive beating spree were seen by many as discrimination towards the non-robust boys, only the minority appears to have been alienated". His mixture of corporal punishment with close friendship continued, with some recipients of the cane offered an alcoholic drink immediately afterwards.

In later years, Chenevix-Trench liked to tell how a pet mouse called Peter had a lucky escape when its diminutive owner, already bent over a chair in his study to be caned, suddenly realised that Peter – the cause of the impending punishment – was still in his back pocket, and politely asked Chenevix-Trench to hold the mouse until the caning was over. Finding the situation uproariously funny, he did not administer the punishment. He also threw himself into the task of fighting for his teaching staff, succeeding in increasing both pay and rights for housemasters, and recruited young graduates constantly to modernise the range of teachers. Despite his own enthusiasm for boxing, when one new recruit was put in charge of gym and expressed his opposition to the sport, key to the school at the time, Chenevix-Trench agreed with his arguments (which were backed by the school medical officer) and boxing was abolished in July 1963. Although he actively but respectfully involved himself in his housemasters' running of their houses, Bradfield also saw the first signs of real problems caused by his administrative or communicative carelessness: heads of departments could find new staff appointed under them without being informed, much less consulted; staff accommodation arrangements were sometimes random; and he found the important consideration of the school timetable arrangements to be completely outside his sense of priorities.

Chenevix-Trench continued to teach while headmaster, and boys described his lessons as exhilarating. That, along with his determination to encourage his staff to follow his example, succeeded in substantially raising academic standards at Bradfield from their already relatively high level. Other triumphs included his use of his excellent rapport with the School Council to persuade them to increase scholarships for gifted but less pecunious boys, increase the numbers of teachers to support a wider curriculum, and approve a new complex of science buildings in March 1956. This was followed in March 1960 by the launch of an appeal fund that ultimately paid for central heating, new kitchens, new study bedrooms for the boys (whose accommodation had been criticised in a March 1959 report Chenevix-Trench requested from the Ministry of Education), and a music hall and language laboratory. Exam results soared, as did the number of boys gaining university places.

Chenevix-Trench's public profile saw a corresponding rise; in 1958 he appeared on the BBC television programme The Brains Trust as a panellist, broadcast on television during the peak time Sunday afternoon slot and then rebroadcast on Home Service radio the following day. Anthony Sampson, describing the headmasters of leading public schools in the original edition of the Anatomy of Britain in 1962, called Chenevix-Trench a "heroic and unusual man". He was the only headmaster appointed to the Committee on Higher Education which produced the Robbins Report that led to significant British university expansion in the decade and later. He signed the Marlow Declaration on society and equality, and declined headmasterships at a host of top schools including Shrewsbury. On 4 March 1963, the BBC announced that he would be the new headmaster of Eton.

=== Eton College ===
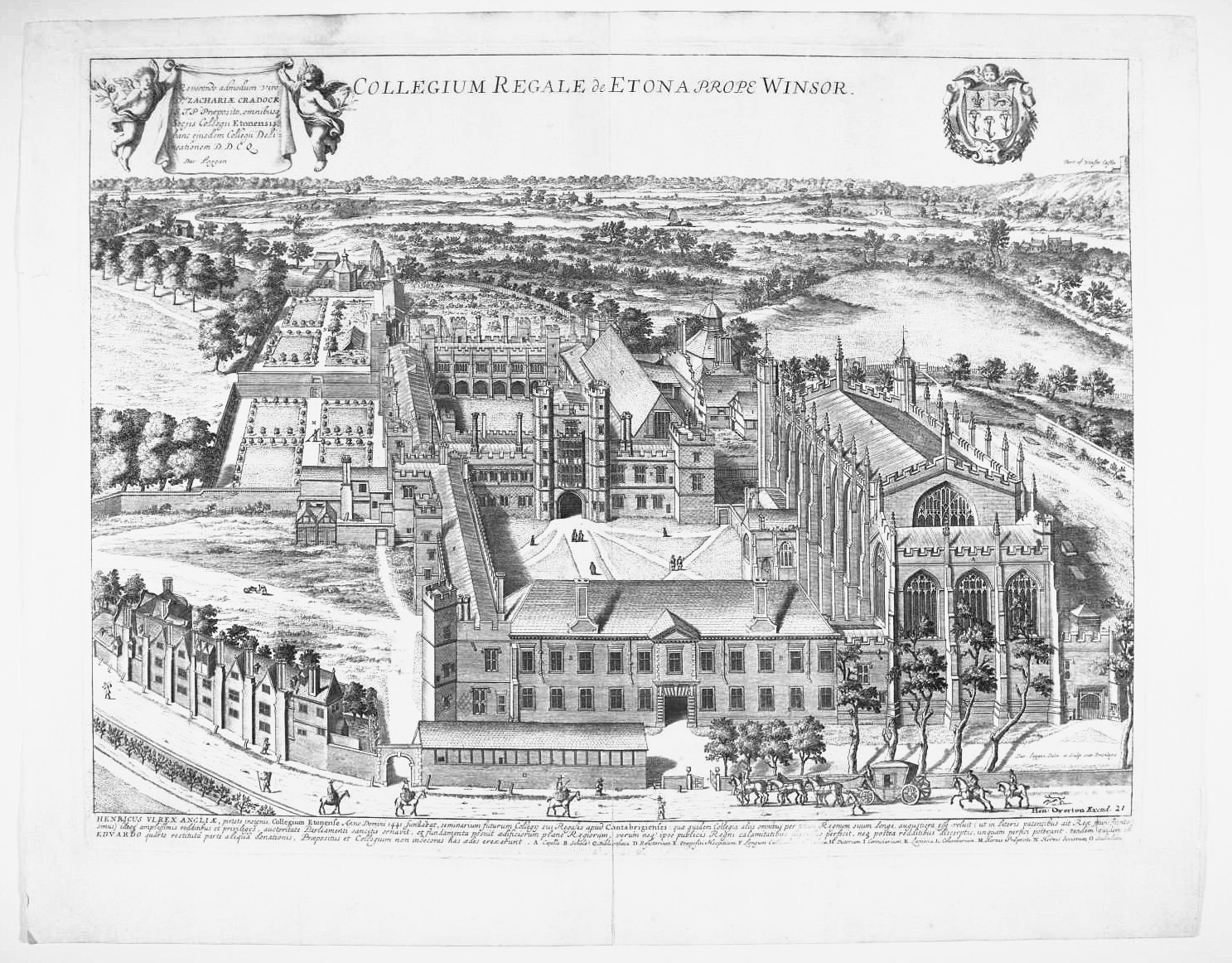
Chenevix-Trench was uneasy amidst Eton's traditional grandeur, the aristocratic parents and the fiercely independent housemasters.

Chenevix-Trench himself told a friend "Eton's too big for me, I'm not the right man. I like to be involved individually with boys." His older brother said he should not take the job. From the outset, Chenevix-Trench did not get along easily with Harold Caccia, who held the uniquely influential position of provost at the school, and was concerned by Chenevix-Trench's administrative failings. Not being an old Etonian himself, he also struggled to find the proper way to deal with the aristocratic rank of many of the parents, and even felt intellectually eclipsed by some of the teachers, in contrast to Bradfield. The housemasters at Eton also had vastly more power and independence than at Bradfield, and Chenevix-Trench's interference with how they dealt with boys from their own houses now caused anger rather than just annoyance, as did his continuing blunders in promising the same promotion to more than one person. He ended up describing the housemasters as like medieval barons with swords half-drawn, and never mastered the subtleties of dealing with them effectively.

Chenevix-Trench's time at Eton, in the midst of the 1960s, was further confused by the sense of change sweeping through the country. The Daily Express said that Eton "may well have elected a man who will help to effect a quiet, but most necessary revolution" at the school. The Eton Chronicle, authored mostly by pupils, was more blunt about the expected upheavals of the times, writing about the new headmaster: "The whole problem of privilege, and the question of integration with the state system of education will inevitably become a political issue arousing vehemence and bigotry". In the final term of 1965, Chenevix-Trench was interviewed in the same publication, and publicly expressed a preference for entry solely by competitive examination rather than by birth and background, and the same year he was still assuring pupils that school uniform was to be abolished entirely. The Chronicle was again a factor in the debate over abolishing boxing; David Jessel and William Waldegrave wrote a piece against it in February 1964, and the Daily Express featured it on its front page. Not all these demands seemed important or realistic to following generations, who also wondered how significant it was whether "to listen to high thoughts and to be at peace in school for ten minutes every day", in chapel, should be optional or not. The BBC reported in 1967 that Chenevix-Trench had "considerably softened" the rigorous rules on chapel attendance. Nevertheless, Private Eye duly ran an article in 1969 (by Paul Foot) arguing that Chenevix-Trench had clearly lost his way, since neither school uniform, nor boxing, nor compulsory Chapel, had been entirely abolished.

The Private Eye article also reported on Chenevix-Trench's approach to corporal punishment. It had always been traditional and frequent at Eton. Until he became headmaster, disobedient students could be publicly birched by the headmaster or Lower Master (deputy head) on their bare buttocks as punishment for serious offences. In addition, senior students at the school were permitted to cane other boys across the seat of the trousers, and this was routine. The Council at Bradfield, always hugely supportive of Chenevix-Trench, had never considered his use of corporal punishment a problem. But at Eton, the modern era of adolescent challenges to authority, combined with the existing tradition of powerful housemasters expecting to make their own decisions, quickly led to problems. In June 1965, Chenevix-Trench failed to prevent a debate proposed by William Waldegrave, then president of the powerful self-selected pupil society known as Pop, on the abolition of corporal punishment, and the motion was only narrowly defeated. Chenevix-Trench caned sixth-formers for trivial offences against the urgings of the Captain of the School (head boy); he caned one editor of the Eton Chronicle and backed down after threatening to cane another; and on a later occasion he agreed with the Captain of the School and his housemaster to punish an offender in a formally witnessed ceremony, but then gave a private caning instead without discussing it with them. The long history at Eton of birchings being public, and most canings being widely witnessed, meant that Chenevix-Trench's preference for private beatings was viewed with suspicion. In 1966, the Provost made him promise that he would no longer issue beatings in private. He did not keep the promise, thus storing up yet more distrust. To replace headmaster's birching, he introduced private caning, also administered to the bare posterior of the boy, who was required to lower his trousers and underpants and bend over in his office. A few boys resented this and felt that a caning over the trousers, as was standard practice at nearly all other schools by this time, would have sufficed.

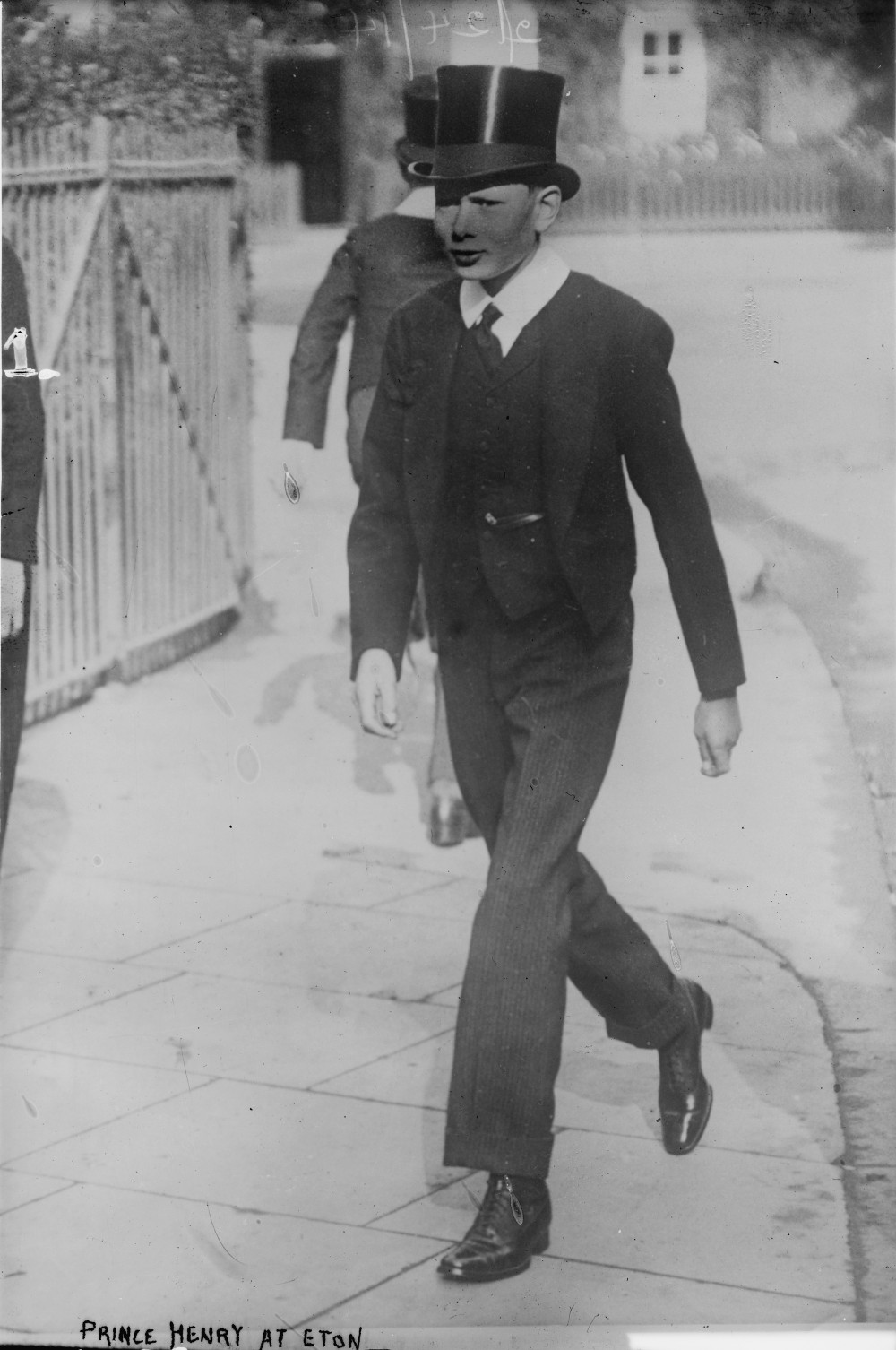
Chenevix-Trench's abolition of the rule requiring smaller boys to wear "bumfreezer" cropped jackets (pictured as worn by Prince Henry) was the only successful part of his campaign to abolish school uniform at Eton altogether.

Despite being so obviously out of his depth, he made some minor and some major reforms. He ended the uniform requirement of smaller boys being marked out by having to wear the much shorter "bumfreezer" Eton Suit, but this was a tiny consolation for the crushing of his cherished goal of ending school uniform at Eton altogether. His reforms of the academic curriculum were colossal, moving Eton from being dominated by classics and catering almost exclusively for boys who had been privately and expensively educated in that field, to a vastly broader curriculum including the establishment of an English department for the first time, as well as introducing proper science teaching. In typical Chenevix-Trench style, these changes were achieved through a lengthy process of vacillation, U-turns, and another half-lie to the provost – massive expenditure was required to fund the new teachers, and even the Classics Department suffering worse than decimation (which contributed to the opposition to Chenevix-Trench) did not make up for it financially. But the consequence was that the school achieved a one-fifth increase in university awards, a "spectacular" increase in O-level and A-level grades, and improved university entrance results.

The tumult of the era continued to faze Chenevix-Trench's tenuous hold on Eton; he adopted a drugs policy that saw him trudging up and down the High Street looking for offenders, and at the same time he declined to expel those caught indulging. With his antipathy toward school uniform, the fashions of longer hair and particular styles of boots did not bother him at all; some of Eton's housemasters were appalled by this lack of diligence. Boys who ran away were rewarded with long talks with the headmaster seeking to find the cause of their problems; traditionalists did not approve, wanting them beaten or expelled or both. Chenevix-Trench had always been shocked by the proportion of boys then at Eton who had absolutely no interest in doing any work, and of whom some had the determination to continue to refuse even when threatened. If he had mastered his relations with housemasters, and understood how to run the school by delegation as it had always been run, this would have been no problem; but for a headmaster that already struggled even with the basics, it was too much.

Chenevix-Trench's health, both physical and mental, also began to suffer, with the return of the malaria he had caught during the war, and flashbacks and nightmares of his wartime experiences. He took tranquilizers to help him with his worsening nerves when carrying out public speaking engagements, and resorted to heavy drinking to drown his other sorrows. The final straw came after a dispute over the future of one of the housemasters, Michael Neal. Neal was a popular and effective teacher but failed to keep proper control over his house. After a major incident in summer 1968, Chenevix-Trench declined to dismiss him, instead offering to resign himself. The offer was rejected, but Neal's house continued to be problematic, and Chenevix-Trench eventually had to fire him on the pretext of a much less serious incident several months later. He handled it badly, leading to protests by the boys, and this combined with a growing awareness of the other problems led the Fellows to decide to ask him to leave. This was dealt with sensitively; Chenevix-Trench himself wrote to parents in July 1969 to inform them that he would be retiring a year later.

=== Fettes College ===
Chenevix-Trench's enforced departure from Eton made him very dubious about his capability to take on another post as headmaster, but in May 1970 he applied to be headmaster of Fettes College in Scotland, and began the job in August 1971. The break between jobs, punctuated by a brief time filling in as a teacher at the prep school Swanbourne House and once again lecturing on a Swan Hellenic tour of Greece, allowed him to recover from the illness and tiredness that had begun to overwhelm him at Eton. Fettes was a school much more amenable to Chenevix-Trench's style of headmastership, with only around 400 pupils, and he quickly resumed the approach he had used at Bradfield, insisting that "my study door is always open to those who want to see me", and making great efforts to please the prep schools and prospective parents and pupils – essential to increase enrolment to improve the parlous state of the school's finances. By January 1978, enrolment had reached 491 boys and 41 girls, in addition to the opening of an attached junior school for eighty boys aged 11 to 13. Chenevix-Trench declined to use the cane on female pupils, even though one girl demanded it – for herself – on grounds of gender equality.

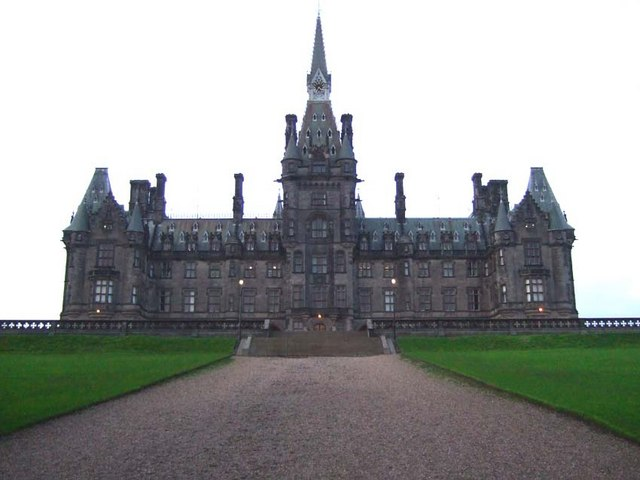
Fettes College was a school of a size better suited to Chenevix-Trench's personal style of leadership; when he arrived it had a tough and austere traditional atmosphere, which he worked to reform.

Other reforms he instituted at Fettes included the abolition of personal fagging – part of the tough traditional system at the school where prefects held considerable power. Mark Peel wrote that "the sight of a petrified third former shaking with fear outside the prefects' room before being exposed to some lurid initiation ritual wasn't unknown". For Chenevix-Trench, modernisation began by relaxing ancient rules; boys were allowed greater access to the adjacent city of Edinburgh, sixth formers were allowed to visit pubs on Saturday evenings, and the dress code was made less restrictive. Some staff were less than happy at the dress code changes; Chenevix-Trench "would roll his eyes to the heavens in boredom if someone deigned to raise the matter at a housemasters meeting". Chenevix-Trench also came under considerable pressure from the teachers over pay; they were significantly underpaid at the time and the school could not afford to pay them (or him) any better. His continued tendency to make promises of appointments that he could not deliver also caused problems again.

Chenevix-Trench also continued his practice of administering corporal punishment in private; as the 1970s progressed, this was increasingly an anachronism when many schools were beginning to abandon caning. After complaints, its use in the school as a whole was discussed by the governors in December 1978, but their eventual conclusion was merely to require proper records to be kept, allow only the headmaster and housemasters to use corporal punishment, and to insist that it be specifically a last resort. By this time, despite having brought the school back from threatened bankruptcy and rejuvenated its fortunes entirely, Chenevix-Trench was once again starting to lose his grip on himself. His father had died in 1964, and his brothers Christopher and Richard in 1971 and 1977 respectively; he himself was increasingly a victim to fatigue, and also to intense regret at what he felt was his failure at Eton. He once again resorted to heavy drinking, trying unsuccessfully to conceal it from his wife. On numerous occasions he had to miss appointments due to drunkenness, and he also used corporal punishment on the wrong boy at least once. In February 1978, he was admitted to hospital suffering from a massive intestinal haemorrhage. He was soon well enough to leave hospital, but was pressured by the governors into announcing that he would retire in August 1979. He attended a series of events to mark his leaving, and in June 1979 he briefed his successor Cameron Cochrane on his hopes and plans for the school, telling his wife "I've handed my life's work over to Cochrane and I'm happy." Two days later he died during an emergency intestinal operation, aged sixty, before his term as headmaster had officially come to an end. He was cremated at Warriston Crematorium, Edinburgh.

== Legacy ==
Chenevix-Trench's biographer, Mark Peel, credits him with transforming Bradfield, building the early foundations for Eton's later rise to academic glory, and bringing Fettes back to being a popular, happy and successful school. Even when just appointed housemaster at Shrewsbury, Peel describes him as having been "already a legend". Not all of these conclusions were accepted wisdom; The Sunday Times viewed the dramatic Eton turnaround as entirely the work of later headmasters. Peel comments that Chenevix-Trench's intensive approach to tutoring, with corporal punishment an integral part of it if the pupil failed to live up to his potential, was something that most boys had no problem with, but that it generated lasting resentment for perhaps one in ten. Peel argued that for boys with non-conformist or politically radical tendencies, intense opposition to Chenevix-Trench was natural; in particular, that Paul Foot and Richard Ingrams were amongst those who revolutionised the school magazine at Shrewsbury, carried their wit from there to Private Eye, and carried their resentment with it.

Tim Card's book Eton Renewed, published in 1994, finally made public the fact that Chenevix-Trench had not left Eton of his own accord. The press of the time were more than interested, fascinated by the idea that there might be some schools that still beat their pupils. Foot duly produced an article describing his own treatment when Chenevix-Trench was housemaster at Shrewsbury, and Nick Cohen summarised it in The Observer:

Even by the standards of England's public schools, Anthony Chenevix-Trench, his housemaster at Shrewsbury, was a flagellomaniac. Foot recalled: 'He would offer his culprit an alternative: four strokes with the cane, which hurt; or six with the strap, with trousers down, which didn't. Sensible boys always chose the strap, despite the humiliation, and Trench, quite unable to control his glee, led the way to an upstairs room, which he locked, before hauling down the miscreant's trousers, lying him face down on a couch and lashing out with a belt.

Exposing him in Private Eye, according to Nick Cohen in The Observer, was one of Foot's happiest days in journalism.

This, along with similar comments in broadsheet newspapers of the time, provoked a furious backlash from other pupils of Chenevix-Trench, who set about proving Peel's "one in ten" rule. Christopher Hourmouzios reminisced to The Times: "He once flogged the living daylights out of me with a strap on my bare backside, and my brother tells me that the 'headman', as we called Trench, once beat him and a whole divinity class of more than twenty boys one afternoon!" But, he went on: (he) "was the same man who abolished boxing at Bradfield, and later at Eton; who was a fine teacher who taught me Latin, just as he had his fellow PoWs after being captured by the Japanese in the Second World War; and who launched a modern, progressive appeal for new college buildings and facilities."

Nick Fraser, in his book The Importance of Being Eton: Inside the World's Most Powerful School, was much more blunt. John Carey in The Sunday Times summarised, Fraser "was subjected to a furtive sexual assault by the headmaster, Anthony Chenevix-Trench, whose proclivities in this area were not made public until after his death, and it damaged him, he says, 'more than I could ever have brought myself to express'. He left Eton nursing doubts about his own sexuality, and went through dark times (marriage failure, job loss, drink, therapy) before he could emerge from Eton's shadow."

The Independent on Sunday reported in 1994:

It is not recorded whether Anthony Chenevix-Trench, the former Eton headmaster, quoted Proverbs 13:24 to the boys he flogged, but glowing testimonies from them following allegations that he was a brute and an alcoholic suggest the essence of the quotation sank home. Card writes that staff at the school were embarrassed by Chenevix-Trench's drinking and that he "regarded corporal punishment not as a last resort, but almost as the first".

The Independent went on to say that the numerous letters to newspapers by former pupils showed a marked disparity between some who described Chenevix-Trench as "upright, justified, a fine educationist, a victim even", and others who recalled "a monster of depravity". Some former pupils who wrote in flatly denied some of the claims; Hume Shawcross, son of Lord Shawcross, one of the offspring of aristocracy whose alleged mistreatment by Chenevix-Trench was claimed by Foot to have contributed to the headmaster's downfall, wrote that "I had relatively few dealings with Chenevix-Trench but I always found him fair and reasonable. In fact, I liked him." He also recollected that Caspar Fleming, son of Ian Fleming, "was in no way unfairly treated by Chenevix-Trench and held no antagonism towards him", and opined that claims to the contrary were part of a "mean-minded vendetta".

In 1998, Fettes College decided to retain a commemorative plaque to Chenevix-Trench in its chapel, "out of respect for all those pupils at Fettes who like and admire him." This statement echoed the words of Sir William Gladstone, who had written in 1996 that "The recording angel knows that Tony achieved a great deal at Eton, both for Eton as a school and for so many of its pupils who liked and admired him." The college removed the plaque and a portrait of Chenevix-Trench in September 2017, reported The Sunday Times the following year.

== Notes ==
Academic offices
Preceded by Robert Birley	Head master of Eton College; 1964–1970	Succeeded by Michael McCrum
