= Robert Streatfeild (priest) =

British–Bahamian Dean (1894–1976)

Robert Cornthwaite Streatfeild (1894–1976) was Dean of Nassau from 1934 until 1943.

Robert Cornthwaite Streatfeild was born on 17 October 1894 at Streatham, Surrey. His father, Rev George Sidney Streatfeild (1844–1921) was vicar of Christ Church, Hampstead. Robert was educated at St Andrews College, Bradfield, Reading, Queens' College, Cambridge and Ridley Hall, Cambridge. During World War I he served with the Machine Gun Corps.

Robert Streatfeild was ordained in 1926. After a curacy in Peckham he was Chaplain to the Bishop of Southwark. He was Vicar general of the Anglican Diocese of Nassau from 1936 to 1943; and Vicar of Leamington on his return from the Caribbean.

He married Gisella Ruth Luttman in October 1938. He retired to Mendip, Somerset where he died in July 1976.
