= Hugh Tapsfield =

English cricketer

Hugh Alexander Tapsfield (31 January 1870 – 3 March 1945) played first-class cricket for Somerset in 1892. He was born at Windsor Castle, Berkshire and died at Weybridge, Surrey.

== Cricket career ==
The son of a minor canon at Windsor Castle who was later the vicar of Nether Stowey in Somerset, Hugh Tapsfield was educated at Bradfield College and at Magdalen College, Oxford University. He played cricket primarily as an opening bowler and lower-order batsman and featured in trial matches for Oxford University in 1889, 1891 and 1892; despite taking wickets in all of these matches, he did not play first-class cricket for the full Oxford side. His only first-class cricket appearance was, in fact, for Somerset against Oxford in 1892; Tapsfield batted in the lower order, scored 0 and 1 and was not called upon to bowl. As a student he was also involved with the Oxford University Dramatic Society in a production of The Frogs that was reviewed in The Times.

== Clerical career ==
After graduating, Tapsfield became a clergyman in the Church of England. In 1895, he was appointed a deacon at Cheshunt, Hertfordshire. By 1902, he was a minor canon at St Paul's Cathedral, London when he gave the main address at the Good Friday service. He resigned as a minor canon in 1906, and was then appointed as vicar at Bembridge, Isle of Wight. He moved to Wootton St Lawrence, Basingstoke in 1911 and there were later moves to Beaconsfield in Buckinghamshire and to West Byfleet in Surrey, where he was living when he died after an operation in 1945.

== Golf ==
From 1913 onwards, Tapsfield's name recurs in golf reports in The Times, playing in the 1930s in prominent tournaments alongside international players and appearing also in "well-connected" matches of club players against the universities and the services. Much of his golf appears to have been played at the expensive St George's Hill club at Weybridge.
