= Nick Higham =

British journalist (born 1954)

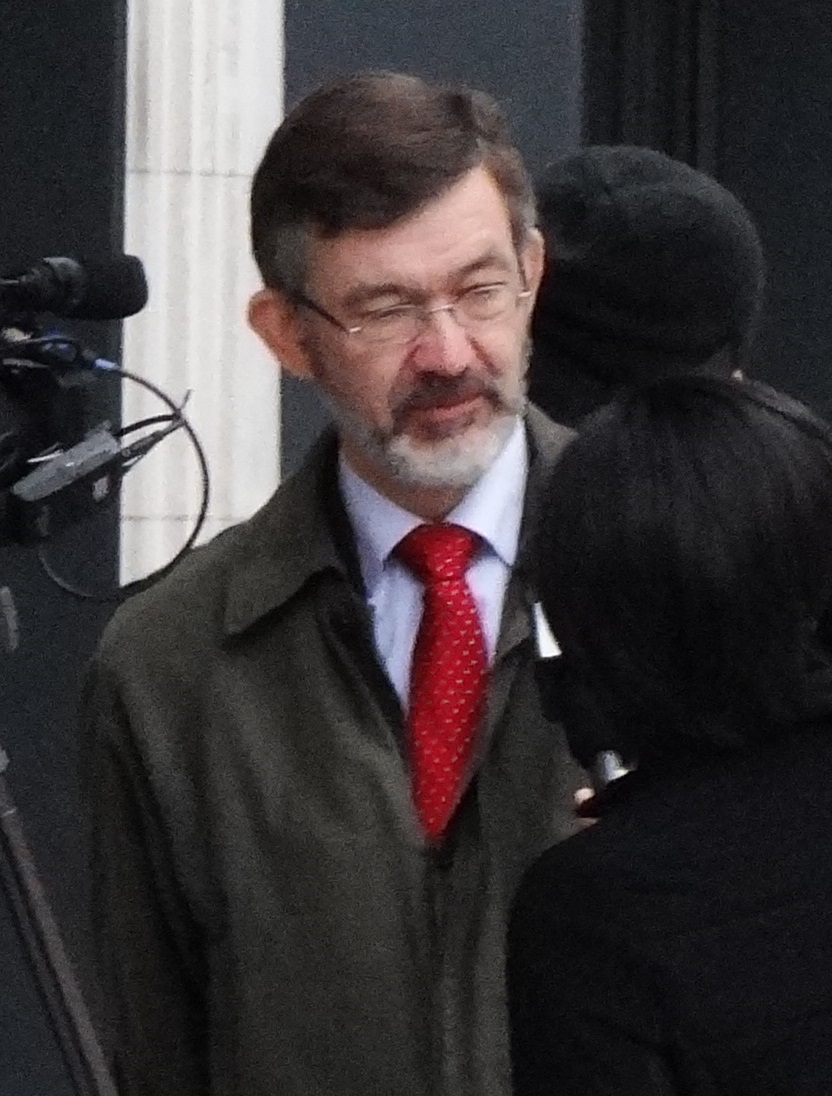
Nick Higham in 2012

Nicholas Geoffrey Higham (born 1 June 1954) is a British journalist and author, most notably as a correspondent for BBC News.

He was educated at Bradfield College and St Catharine's College, Cambridge, where he graduated with a degree in English in 1975. He began his career as a freelance journalist between 1978 and 1988, when he joined the BBC as its first Media Correspondent. His role expanded in 1993 to include the arts as well as media, before he became an analyst for BBC News 24 in 2003.

From 2007 he became a wider correspondent for BBC News, and was also the presenter of Meet The Author on the BBC News Channel (as BBC News 24 had been renamed) until January 2016. Higham left the BBC in 2018.

== Bibliography ==
- Higham, Nicholas (2022). The Mercenary River (1st ed.). United Kingdom: Headline Publishing Group. ISBN 978-1-4722-8383-2.
