= Henry Hayman (educationist) =

British clergyman and headmaster (1823–1904)

Henry Hayman (1823–1904) was a British Anglican priest and educator. Becoming the headmaster of Rugby School, in post from 1870 to 1874, as the successor of Frederick Temple, he was dismissed from the position in a very public controversy.

== Early life ==
Hayman was born on 3 March 1823 in Surrey Street, Strand, London, the eldest son of Philip Dell Hayman; the journalist Johh Marshall Hayman was his brother. In October 1832, Hayman entered Merchant Taylors' School, and becoming head monitor passed with a Sir Thomas White scholarship on 28 June 1841 to St. John's College, Oxford, where he graduated B.A. with a double second class in 1845. He proceeded M.A. in 1849, B.D. in 1854, and D.D. in 1870. He was a Fellow of his college from 1844 to 1855, and received the degree of M.A., ad eundem, at Cambridge in the latter year. He was ordained deacon in 1847 and priest in 1848.

Hayman was curate of St. Luke's, Old Street, London, from 1848 to 1849. and of St. James's, Westminster, from 1849 to 1851, and was assistant preacher at the Temple Church from 1854 to 1857. In 1852 he turned to teaching, first as an assistant master at Charterhouse School. He was headmaster at St Olave's Grammar School from 1855 to 1859, and at Cheltenham Grammar School, from 1859 to 1868. He had one year, 1868–9, as head of St Andrew's College, Bradfield.

== Headmaster of Rugby School ==
On 20 November 1869, Hayman was elected headmaster of Rugby School in succession to Frederick Temple. Hayman was a high church conservative, while Temple was a liberal broad church man, one of the group publishing Essays and Reviews in 1860. Temple would have preferred John Percival, and his choice would have been Theodore Walrond, of the other candidates. Hayman, anyway, was alien to the tradition of Thomas Arnold, head of Rugby from 1828 to 1841. Initially, an issue was made of Hayman's testimonials. Matthew Arnold looked at them, at the time, with Arthur Penrhyn Stanley, and concluded that "they are such as will perfectly enable the trustees to stand by the appointment" if they wished.

Hayman's appointment was by the trustees of the school. The Public Schools Act 1868 meant that the trustees were about to be replaced by a governing body. When the matter came to court, it was ruled that the incoming governing body were not bound to continue Hayman in post.

The timeline of the Hayman affair published by Samuel Ralph Townshend Mayer, a Hayman supporter, shows that the transition occurred at the end of 1871, when six of the trustees became governors. Temple, George Granville Bradley, and William Henry Bateson, partisan against Hayman, were on the governing body. Roach writes:

"Temple did nothing to conceal his hostility ... It seems extraordinary that he was prepared to behave in such a way towards his successor. ... Hayman seems to have been tactless and good at making enemies."

Hayman was opposed by almost all of the staff: 20 out of 21 assistant masters had protested to the trustees about the appointment. To no avail, Temple told Hayman that he was informing the trustees that their choice would be a disaster. Initially Edward Ashley Scott led resistance to Hayman, and Hayman unsuccessfully asked the trustees to sack him. Again, in 1873, Hayman chose to target leaders of hostility to him, Arthur Sidgwick (as "the only single man"), and Charles James Eliseo Smith (1835–1900). In this case, the governing body dismissed Hayman, its chairman Henry Philpott having become disillusioned with Hayman's methods.

Hayman took the governors to court, retaining William Pearson QC. Richard Malins as Vice-Chancellor of England agreed with the defence's demurrer, and ruled the court should not interfere. Malins also made it clear, however, that in his view Hayman had been badly treated. He made no ruling on costs, and Hayman was subsidised by supporters. W. H. D. Rouse's 1898 history of the school passes over the period with comments on the new building work by William Butterfield.

== Later life ==
Hayman served as Rector at Aldingham from 1874 until 1904. He died there on 11 July 1904, and was buried in the churchyard.

== Works ==
- Articles by Henry Hayman including "My Time At Rugby (1869–74)"

== Notes ==
Attribution
