= Alan Hinde =

English cricketer, soldier, local government politician

Brigadier-General Alan Hinde CMG JP
- Born: 17 May 1876; Bromley, Kent, England
- Died: 24 August 1950 (aged 74); Great Cornard, Suffolk, England
- Cricket career

Cricket information
- Batting: Unknown
- Bowling: Unknown

Domestic team information
- Years: Team
- 1907/08: Europeans

Career statistics
Competition	First-class
Matches	2
Runs scored	19
Batting average	4.75
100s/50s	–/–
Top score	12
Balls bowled	186
Wickets	4
Bowling average	24.50
5 wickets in innings	–
10 wickets in match	–
Best bowling	4/85
Catches/stumpings	1/–
- Source: ESPNcricinfo, 26 November 2023

Alan Hinde CMG JP (17 May 1876 – 24 August 1950) was a British Army officer and an English first-class cricketer. Hinde served in the Royal Artillery with distinction from 1895 to 1923, seeing action in both the Second Boer War and the First World War. On retirement he held the honorary rank of brigadier-general. His military service took him to British India prior to the First World War, where he played first-class cricket for the Europeans cricket team. Following his retirement from military service, Hinde undertook civic duties in West Suffolk, which included a fourteen-year tenure as chairman of Melford Rural District Council.

== Early life and military service ==
The son of Walter Alan Hinde, he was born at Bromley in May 1876. He was educated at Bradfield College, where he represented both the cricket and football teams. From there, he proceeded to the Royal Military Academy, Woolwich. Hinde graduated into the Royal Artillery (RA) as a second lieutenant in November 1895, with promotion to lieutenant following in November 1898. He served in the Second Boer War and was involved in operations in the Orange Free State, including the engagements at Polar Grove and Driefontein. During the war, he was afflicted by typhoid, but returned to serve in its remainder and was promoted to captain in September 1901. At the conclusion of the conflict, Hinde remained in South Africa with the RA until 1906, before moving with his brigade to Kirkee in British India. There, he made two appearances in first-class cricket for the Europeans cricket team in August and September 1907; both came against the Parsees, with the first coming in the Bombay Tournament at Bombay, with the second coming in the Presidency Match at Poona. In these matches, he took 4 wickets (all in a single innings) and scored 19 runs.

== World War I and later life ==
Hinde attended the Staff College in 1911. He was promoted to major in February 1912, and was appointed to the staff in October 1913. Hinde served during the First World War, being appointed a 2nd Grade General Staff Officer in January 1915, and a temporary lieutenant colonel in June 1915, whilst serving as a 1st Grade Staff Officer. In January 1917, he was made a brevet colonel and in the latter part of the war he served on the staff of Field Marshal Haig, and was made a temporary brigadier-general in March 1918. Engagements he was present at during the war included the Battle of Mons and the First Battle of Ypres. In August 1918 Hinde was decorated by France with the Legion of Honour, whilst following the war, he was made a Companion of the Order of St Michael and St George in the 1919 New Year Honours. He relinquished the temporary rank of brigadier-general in July 1919 and returned to the RA from the staff, later gaining the full rank of colonel in January 1921. He later returned to the staff, serving as a liaison officer in Upper Silesia during the 1921 Upper Silesia plebiscite, retiring in March 1923 with the honorary rank of brigadier-general.

Hinde lived in Great Cornard in Suffolk following his retirement, where he was active in local politics. He was chairman of the Melford Rural District Council for fourteen years from 1932 to 1946, and later stood as a candidate for West Suffolk County Council in 1939, following a vacancy left by the elevation of a sitting councillor to alderman. He also served as a justice of the peace for West Suffolk. With rationing still implemented in post-war Britain, Hinde was the food executive officer for Sudbury and Melford until his retirement from that post in January 1950. He died at Great Cornard in August 1950.
