= Dave Deacon =

English footballer

Personal information
- Full name: David Benjamin Deacon
- Date of birth: 10 March 1929
- Place of birth: Broome, England
- Date of death: 23 July 1990 (aged 61)
- Place of death: Cambridge, England
- Position: Full back

Senior career*
| Years | Team | Apps | (Gls) |
| – | Bungay Town | | |
| 1950–1960 | Ipswich Town | 66 | (0) |
| – | Cambridge United | | |
- * Club domestic league appearances and goals

David Benjamin Deacon (10 March 1929 – 23 July 1990) was an English professional footballer who played in the Football League as a full back for Ipswich Town. He also played non-league football for Bungay Town and Cambridge United. His brother Jimmy was a Council member of the Suffolk County FA.
