= Samuel Ralph Townshend Mayer =

Samuel Ralph Townshend Mayer (1841–1880) was a British journalist and writer, the founder of the Free and Open Church Association.

== Biography ==
Mayer was born at Gloucester in August 1841, the second son of Samuel Mayer, a solicitor. As he grew up, he became a contributor to newspapers in Gloucester and to many serial publications. He later moved to London, where he had a career as a man of letters.

In 1866, Mayer founded the Free and Open Church Association and served as its secretary until February 1872. Mayer was the editor of the first report of the Metropolitan Conservative Working Men's Association in 1868. In 1870, Mayer and James Bertrand Payne established the Junior Conservative Club. It was on Parliament Street, Whitehall, London, and Payne quickly took over from Mayer as secretary.

Mayer edited the Churchman's Shilling Magazine, the Illustrated Review from January to June 1871, the Free and Open Church Advocate, 3 vols. 1872 to 1877, and was the proprietor and editor of the St. James's Magazine in 1875. He died at Richmond, Surrey, on 28 May 1880.

== Works ==
- Amy Fairfax, a novelette, 1859
- Fractional Supplement to Hotson's Ready Reckoner, 1861
- Extracts from the minute book of the governing body of Rugby School (1874). In the controversy over the dismissal of Henry Hayman from his position as headmaster of Rugby School, Mayer was joint treasurer of the "Hayman Defence Fund".
- Letters of Elizabeth Barrett Browning Addressed to Richard Hengist Horne (1877, 2 vols.), editor
- Afghanistan: Its Political and Military History, Geography and Ethnology (1879), with John C. Paget

On the history of Sunday schools, Mayer wrote:

- The Origin and Growth of Sunday Schools in England (1878)
- Who was the Founder of Sunday Schools? Being an Inquiry (1880). In this work, he attempted to prove that Thomas Stock deserved as much credit as Robert Raikes for the founding of Sunday schools in the United Kingdom.

== Family ==
Mayer married in 1868 Gertrude Dalby (1839–1932), daughter of John Watson Dalby. She was also a published author. Her works include novels, a non-fiction work on women writers, and an edition, heavily abridged, of The Broad Arrow by Caroline Leakey. She went on to become editor of Temple Bar. In later life she was a publisher's reader for Macmillan & Co.

John Watson Dalby was born in 1799: his date of death is unclear, but he lived to age about 80. He was a minor poet, a prolific writer of sonnets. He also wrote signed political poetry in The Black Dwarf, a radical newspaper published in the years around 1820. He succeeded Thomas Byerley as editor of the Literary Chronicle and Weekly Review in 1826, for two years, introducing an anti-Catholic editorial line.

== Leigh Hunt legacy ==
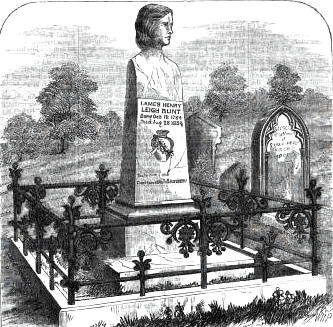
Leigh Hunt memorial, Kensal Green cemetery, 1869 engraving

In 1847 correspondence, the campaigning journalist and poet Leigh Hunt (died 1859) mentioned G. J. De Wilde of the Nottingham Mercury, and Dalby, as valued supporters. Mayer organized Hunt's memorial service. He also took up Samuel Carter Hall's suggestion of a memorial to Hunt, in Kensal Green Cemetery, set up in 1869. He was instrumental, with Robert Browning and Dalby, in dedicating an abbey niche to Hunt.

Thornton Leigh Hunt, Hunt's son, gave the Leigh Hunt papers to Mayer shortly before his 1873 death. Mayer then added to the published correspondence of Leigh Hunt, in periodicals, with letters involving Benjamin Robert Haydon, Charles Ollier, Thomas Southwood Smith and Lord Brougham.
