= Broome, Norfolk =

Village in Norfolk, England

Coordinates: 52.469°N 1.457°E

Broome
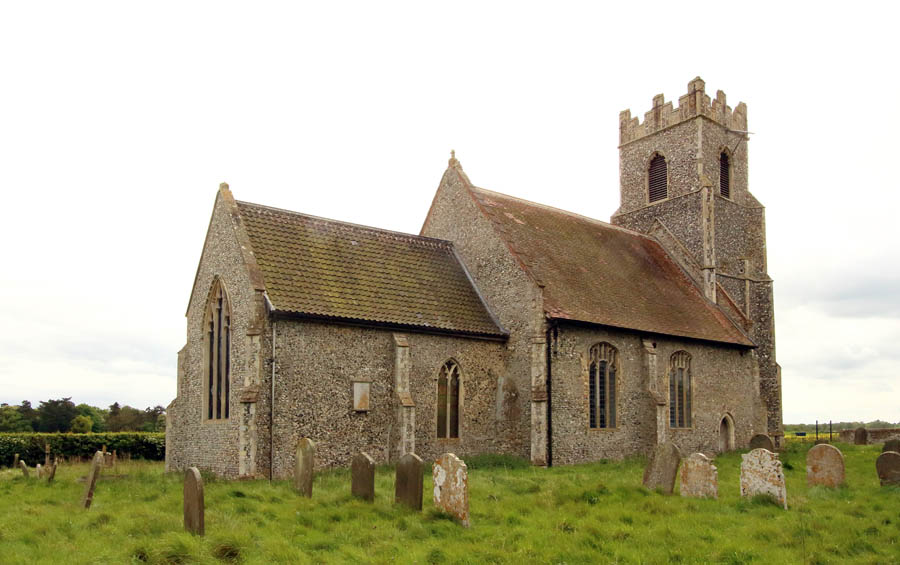
- St. Michael's Church

- Location within Norfolk
- Area: 5.91 km^{2} (2.28 sq mi)
- Population: 486 (2021)
  - Density: 82/km^{2} (210/sq mi)
- OS grid reference: TM 349 913
- Civil parish: Broome
- District: South Norfolk
- Shire county: Norfolk
- Region: East
- Country: England
- Sovereign state: United Kingdom
- Post town: BUNGAY
- Postcode district: NR35
- Dialling code: 01986
- Police: Norfolk
- Fire: Norfolk
- Ambulance: East of England
- UK Parliament: Waveney Valley

Broome is a village and civil parish in the south of the English county of Norfolk. It is 1.5 miles (2.4 km) north-east of Bungay in Suffolk and 13 miles (21 km) south-east of Norwich.

At the 2021 census, Broome had a population of 486, a slight increase from the 458 people recorded in the 2011 census. The A143 road, between Gorleston-on-Sea and Haverhill runs through the parish, whilst the River Waveney marks the southern border. The village pub, The Artichoke, closed in January 2024. In the Domesday Book, Broome is recorded as a settlement of 41 households in the hundred of Henstead. In 1086, the village was part of the estates of St. Edmund's Abbey.

Broome Pits are a series of four former gravel pits which now form fishing lakes in which carp, northern pike, tench and bream can be caught.

Broome's parish church is dedicated to Saint Michael and dates from the 14th and 15th centuries. It is located outside of the village and is Grade I listed. The church was significantly remodelled in the 19th century and has a font from this period. The village sign was restored in an episode of The Repair Shop.

== Notable people ==
- Thomas Manning (1772-1840) sinologist, born in Broome
- Henry Jollye (1841-1902) cricketer, educator and clergyman, born in Broome
- Dave Deacon (1929-1990) Ipswich Town footballer, born in Broome
- Joe Lewis (b.1987) Peterborough United and Aberdeen footballer
