= Michael Hoban =

Brian Michael Stanislaus Hoban (7 October 1921 in British Guiana – 6 July 2003), was a teacher of classics, and Headmaster of Harrow School from 1971–81.

His father died when he was a small child and he spent two years in an orphanage. In 1934 he won a scholarship to Charterhouse, where he remained until the onset of World War II in 1939. He spent the war as a captain with the Westminster Dragoons, and was mentioned in dispatches.

From 1946–49 he was a student of classics at University College, Oxford. In 1947 he married Jasmine Holmes, the daughter of his Charterhouse house master. From 1949–52 he was an assistant master at Uppingham School teaching classics. From 1952–59 he was an assistant master at Shrewsbury School teaching classics. From 1960–64 he was Headmaster of St Edmund's School, Canterbury.

From 1964–71, he was Headmaster of Bradfield College. In 1971 he was named Headmaster of Harrow. He headed Harrow at a difficult time for British public schools generally, due to the political environment and financial pressures. Despite sometimes public criticism, Hoban responded with cost-saving measures, whilst refurbishing houses. During his tenure at Harrow, numbers slipped below 700 only three times. He oversaw many important building projects, including the new Central Feeding block; the New Knoll boarding house; and new physics and maths schools. He retired in 1981.

== Death ==
Hoban died on 6 July 2003, aged 81.
