= R. E. Vernède =

English poet and writer

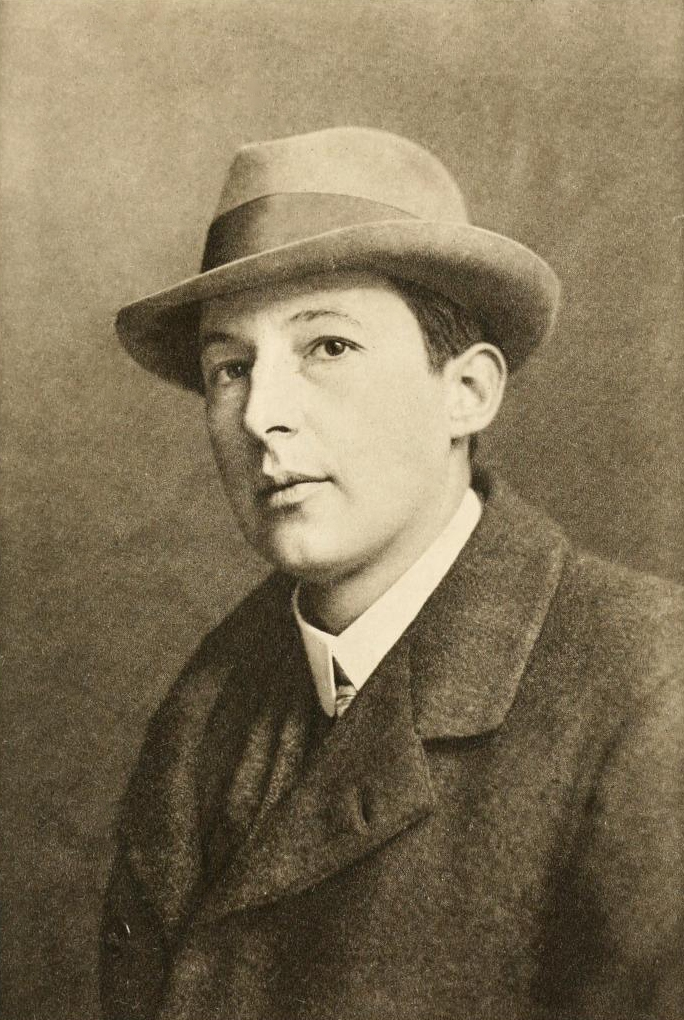
Robert Ernest Vernède, an English poet and writer, now remembered as a war poet

Robert Ernest Vernède (1875 – 9 April 1917) was an English poet and writer, now remembered as a war poet.

He was born in London, and educated at St Paul's School (where he was a friend of G. K. Chesterton and E. C. Bentley), and at St John's College, Oxford. After graduating, he wrote novels and short stories.

He enlisted with the British Army as a second lieutenant in the 3rd Batt. Rifle Brigade in 1914, at the start of World War I, although over the maximum age of service. He served in France, where he was wounded in 1916 in the Battle of the Somme. He was received at Somerville Hospital in Oxford. He returned to the front, but died after being wounded by machine gun fire while leading an advance at Havrincourt. He was buried at Le Bucquiere Communal Cemetery Extension.

Chesterton wrote an appreciation of Vernède for the school magazine, describing his death as "so heavy a loss for those of us who loved him" and called it "an addition or completion to that shining company of poets whose patriotism turned them into soldiers, and gave them a life and death more worthy of legend".

His War Poems, And Other Verses was published in 1917 by William Heinemann.

== See also ==
- R. V. Vernède
- Index entry for Robert Vernède at Poets' Corner
