= Christopher Steel (composer) =

British composer

Charles Christopher Steel (31 December 1938 – 31 December 1991) was a British composer of classical music.

Steel was born in London, and educated at Shrewsbury School. In 1957 he enrolled at the Royal Academy of Music, studying under John Gardner with the aid of a scholarship, and four years later in Munich with Harald Genzmer, who was a protégé of Hindemith. He then returned to England, where he taught and composed for the remainder of his life.

Early works include the Sonatinas for piano and clarinet. Steel considerably broadened his output and range, as his compositions were published by Novello & Co. He became music master at Cheltenham College in 1963, subsequently moving to Bradfield College where he wrote a number of scores for the triennial Greek plays, including The Bacchae (1973) and Agamemnon (1976). In 1977/78 during a brief period in Minnesota, United States, he wrote what he considered to be his most important work, the Passion and Resurrection according to St Mark for chorus and orchestra. During the 1980s he devoted more time to composing, sustained by freelance teaching. During this period he lived in Nettlebed Oxfordshire, where between 1981 and 1988 where he was organist at St Bartholomew's Church. In 1988 he moved with his wife Anthea to Cheltenham where he continued to compose and teach until his death, late in 1991, on his 53rd birthday.

Steel's catalogue contains seven symphonies, numerous choral works, organ music, concerti, and orchestral pieces for large and chamber orchestra. He was described in the New Grove Dictionary of Music as a "fluent and resourceful composer".

His music has similarities to Walton, Britten and Mathias, remaining accessible by virtue of its neoromanticism alongside some extended tonality. His work has been recorded by Durham Cathedral Choir, Wells Cathedral Choir, and organists including Roger Fisher and Philip Rushforth. Notable CD recordings where his music is featured include his Changing Moods: suite for organ op.59 on Animal Parade (REGCD346) played by William Saunders; Variations on a Theme of Guillaume de Machaut, Op. 65 in Grand Organ of Chester Cathedral played by Philip Rushforth; and his Six Pieces, op.33 in The King's Trumpeter (PRCD189), with Crispian Steele-Perkins, and Stephen Cleobury, organist, and director of the King's College Choir, Cambridge. Steel's People Look East – an advent carol, recorded by Durham Cathedral choir for Priory Records on their compilation of Christmas Carols, A Feast of Christmas Carols (PRCD-4000) – has proved one of his most enduring short works, as has his choral anthem Thou Art The Way, which has been included in Novello's compilation More Than Hymns, Vol. 2 and in the CD More Than Hymns (LAMM149) recorded by Wells Cathedral Choir directed by Malcolm Archer.

Steel's music has been performed at The Three Choirs Festival, BBC1's Songs of Praise (the premiere of the anthem The Morning Stars Sang Together sung by Chester Cathedral Choir), and played on radio including BBC Radio 3, BBC Radio 4, and Classic FM. On 21 March 2009 Passion and Resurrection according to St Mark received its world premiere at Tewkesbury Abbey, performed by the Cheltenham Bach Choir and the Regency Sinfonia conducted by Stephen Jackson.
