= R. V. Vernède =

Raymond Veveysan Vernède (9 December 1905 – 18 October 2003) was an English colonial administrator in India and a writer. He was educated at Bradfield College and Hertford College, Oxford. He was in the Indian Civil Service from 1928 to 1947; later he became Bursar of St Peter's College, Oxford.

On 6 November 1937, at Lucknow, he married Nancy Mary Kendall, younger daughter of Sir Charles and Lady Kendall of Weir House, Countess Weir, Devon. Sir Charles Kendall, a Judge in the Allahabad High Court, was in various posts in the Indian Civil Service, shifting towards the judicial side of things after his marriage in 1910.

He is known for two books based on his experiences in Garhwal in the Himalayas: The Enchanted Loom, a historical novel, and The Collector's Bag, stories. He also edited British Life in India (1995), an anthology of writings, and A Sounding of Verses.

== See also ==
- R. E. Vernède
