= Herbert Branston Gray =

Herbert Branston Gray (21 April 1851 – 5 April 1929) was an English clergyman and schoolmaster. He was Headmaster and later Warden of Bradfield College and Chairman of the Headmasters' Conference for the year 1900.

Born at Putney, Gray was the younger son of Thomas Gray, of St Peter's, Kent, in the Isle of Thanet, a businessman in the City of London, by his marriage to Emily Mary Heath at Wandsworth in 1849. He was educated at Winchester at Chernocke House (Furleys) as exhibitioner (1865–70) and Queen's College, Oxford. In 1877 he was ordained and became an assistant master at Westminster School before being appointed as Headmaster at Louth Grammar School in 1878, then Bradfield College in 1880. In 1881 Gray established Bradfield's tradition of Greek plays, when as headmaster he arranged for the first such play, Alcestis, to be performed to raise money for the school at a time of financial hardship. Gray was inspired by the performance of Agamemnon at Balliol College, Oxford, in 1880, directed by F. R. Benson. He successfully invited Benson to manage the Bradfield play, and Benson played Apollo himself.

In 1882 Gray married Selina Marriott at Sleaford, Lincolnshire.

By 1898 Gray had the title at Bradfield of "Warden and Chairman of Council", meaning that he was in charge of the school's governance and not managing its teaching from day to day. In 1900, he was chairman of the Headmasters' Conference, and the annual conference was held at Bradfield.

In 1903 Gray was a Member of the Moseley Educational Commission to the United States. In his The Public Schools and the Empire (1913), he recommended that scholarship funding and the competitive system needed to be reformed and that "the cult of sport" should be eliminated.

At the time of his death Gray was Vicar of Lynton, Devon. He left a widow, Selina Gray, and an estate valued at £6,426.

== Selected publications ==
- Herbert Branston Gray, Modern Laodiceans, and other sermons (Rivingtons, 1883)
- Herbert Branston Gray, Men of Like Passions: Being Characters of Some Bible Heroes and Other Sermons Preached to Bradfield Boys (Longmans, Green, & Company, 1894)
- Herbert Branston Gray, "Report of the Reverend Herbert Branston Gray" in Reports of the Mosely Educational Commission to the United States of America (London: Co-operative Printing Society Limited, 1904)
- Herbert Branston Gray, The Public Schools and the Empire (Michigan: University of Michigan, 1913)
- Herbert Branston Gray DD, The Crossways: the Reform of Secondary Education (1913)
- Herbert Branston Gray DD, America at School and at Work (London: Nisbet, 1918)
