= Henry Jollye =

English cricketer

Personal information
- Full name: Henry Clarke Jollye
- Born: 12 October 1841; Broome, Norfolk, England
- Died: 17 December 1902 (aged 61); Walton, Wiltshire, England
- Batting: Unknown

Domestic team information
- Years: Team
- 1862: Oxford University

Career statistics
Competition	First-class
Matches	1
Runs scored	0
Batting average	0.00
100s/50s	–/–
Top score	0
Catches/stumpings	1/–
- Source: Cricinfo, 4 March 2020

Henry Clarke Jollye (12 October 1841 – 17 December 1902) was an English first-class cricketer, educator and clergyman.

The son of Hunting Jollye, he was born in October 1841 at Broome, Norfolk. He was educated at Bradfield College, matriculating at Merton College, Oxford in 1861, and graduating B.A. in 1866, M.A. in 1873. While studying at Oxford, he made a single appearance in first-class cricket for Oxford University against the Gentlemen of England at Lord's in 1862. Batting once in the match, he was dismissed without scoring by Henry Arkwright in the Oxford first-innings.

After graduating B.A. from Oxford, Jollye took holy orders in the Church of England and returned to Bradfield College in the capacity of assistant master from 1867. He died in December 1902 at Walton, Wiltshire.
