= Herbert Gray (Irish priest) =

Archdeacon of Leighlin

Herbert Gray was Archdeacon of Leighlin from 1661 to 1662.
