= Bradfield College =

Public school in Bradfield, Berkshire, England

Coordinates: 51°26′57″N 01°07′52″W

St Andrew's College, Bradfield (Bradfield College)

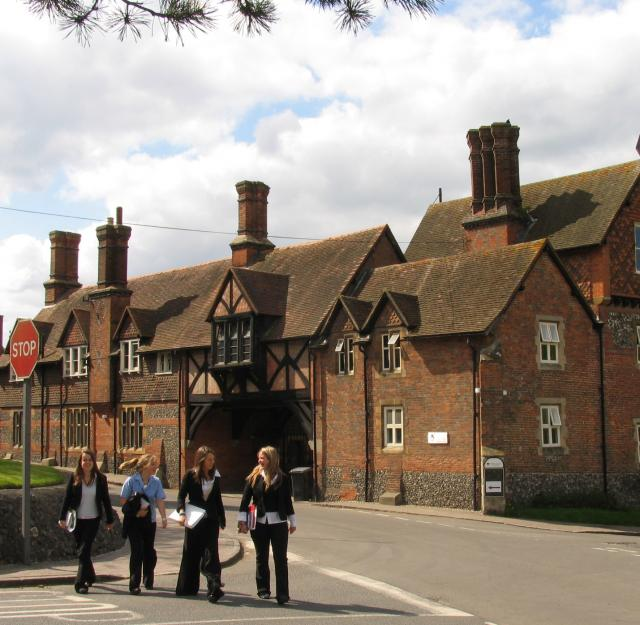
- Bradfield, Berkshire, RG7 6AU; England

Information
- Type: Public School; Private boarding school
- Motto: Benedictus es, O Domine doce me Statuta Tua (Blessed art thou O Lord: O teach me thy statutes)
- Religious affiliation: Church of England
- Established: 1850; 176 years ago
- Founder: Thomas Stevens, Rector and Lord of the manor of Bradfield
- Department for Education URN: 110121 Tables
- Headmaster: Jeremy Quartermain
- Second Master: Andrew Logan
- Staff: 120 (approx.)
- Gender: Mixed
- Age: 13 to 18
- Enrolment: 810
- Houses: 12
- Colours: Light blue Eton Blue
- Publication: The Bradfieldian
- Alumni: Old Bradfieldians
- Website: bradfieldcollege.org.uk

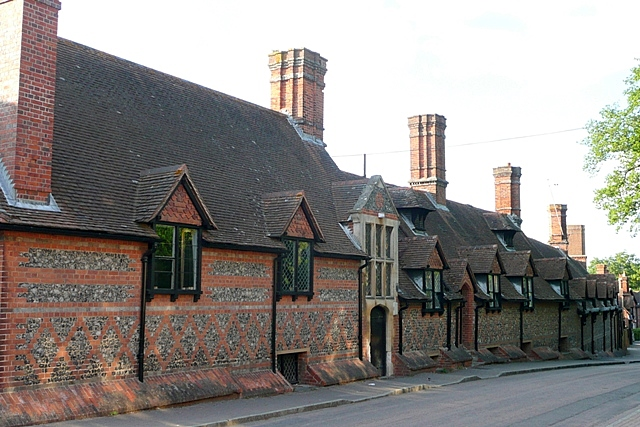
Original buildings of Bradfield College

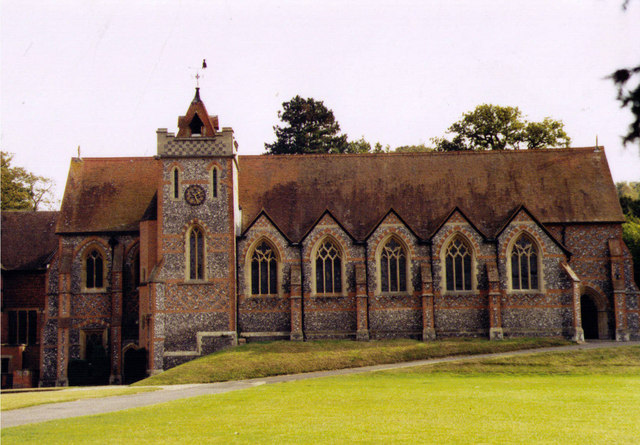
Bradfield College Chapel

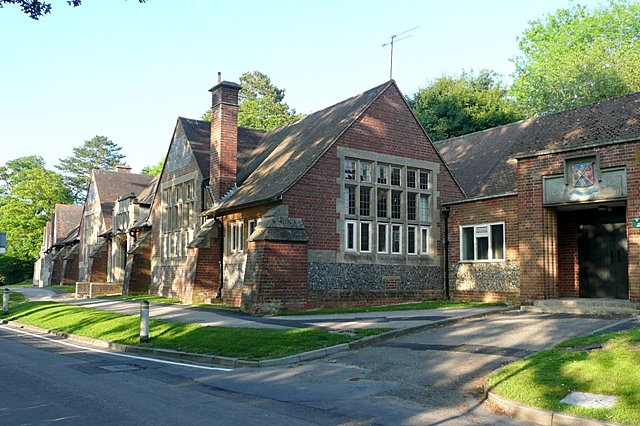
Bradfield College buildings

Bradfield College is a coeducational public school (independent boarding and day school) for pupils aged 13–18, in the village of Bradfield, in Berkshire, in the United Kingdom. It is noted for its open-air Greek theatre and its triennial Greek play.

The school is a member of the Rugby Group, which also includes Rugby, Harrow, Shrewsbury, Wellington College and Charterhouse.

The college was founded in 1850 by Thomas Stevens, Rector and Lord of the manor of Bradfield. It has around 490 male and 320 female pupils.

== Overview ==
According to the Good Schools Guide, "Thoroughly unpretentious yet with lots to boast about, Bradfield is a heavenly place to learn and to grow. Very difficult to imagine who would not thrive here. There's something for everyone and lots for all."

The school, which admits pupils between the ages of 13 and 18, has been fully co-educational since September 2005. All first year pupils (Fourth Formers) enter a first year boarding house (Faulkner's) and then, from the second year (known as the Shell), they move to their main boarding houses for the remaining four years.

The school motto is the Latin rendering of Psalm 119:12 Benedictus es, O Domine. Doce me Statuta Tua, which means "You are blessed, Lord. Teach me your Laws".

== History ==
Bradfield College was founded in 1850 by Thomas Stevens. Stevens had inherited the manor of Bradfield from his father in 1842, having been in his family for four generations. As a tribute to his father, he set about restoring St Andrew's Church, Bradfield and commissioned Sir Gilbert Scott (one of whose architect sons, John Oldrid Scott, was later to marry Thomas Stevens's eldest daughter, Mary Anne) to effect the restoration. It was decided that the majority of the church, except the tower, should be demolished and rebuilt in a style influenced by that of gothic architecture. After the completion of the church in 1848, Stevens saw it fit to arrange a choir. While the whole village were able to sing, they were not felt to be of a high enough standard. It was proposed that a college be established at Bradfield, to be called St Andrew's College. The college was to be for the education of a limited number of boys between the ages of 8 and 12, all to be from modest backgrounds. Their education was to be based upon 'true Church principles', with focus to be paid on reading, writing, mathematics, and music, and later on, classics and history.

The first headmaster to be appointed was F. B. Guy in 1852. The headmaster was to be under control of the college warden, who would be responsible for the principal governance of the college. Soon after the formal establishment of the college, all references to 'true Church principles' were dropped, with the focus now being on providing an education like that of other British Public Schools.

By 1880 there were eight masters and 75 boys (far fewer than the founder's aim of 300); creditors were petitioning for the school's bankruptcy given debts of £160,000; by 1900 there were 292 students, making the school more financially viable.

== The Greek play ==
Bradfield is renowned for its Greek plays and outdoor Greek theatre. The first Greek play, Alcestis, was performed in the original language in 1881. The play was put on by Headmaster, Herbert Branston Gray to save the school from bankruptcy and was inspired by the performance of Agamemnon at Balliol College, Oxford in 1880, directed by F. R. Benson, who stage-managed the Bradfield performance and took the role of Apollo.

The theatre was based on that at Epidaurus and built in a disused chalk pit. It opened in 1890 with a performance of Antigone.

The theatre was closed in 2009 due to its poor state of repair, especially the temple building. Following a £1.3 million appeal, the theatre was restored and reopened with a performance of Antigone on 20 June 2014. The college decided not to rebuild the Victorian temple at the rear of the performing area because such "temples" are not true to the design of ancient Greek theatres.

The Greek play is normally performed on a three-year rota. The students who act in them receive no formal training in speaking Ancient Greek, and have only nine months to learn the lines and direction, while keeping up with their studies. The 2023 Oedipus the King was the first hybrid production; the choral elements were performed in Ancient Greek, alongside scenes in Modern English.

== Headmasters ==
1850 Frederick Barlow Guy

1852–1860 Robert Edward Sanderson

1860-1868 Stephen Poyntz Denning

1868–1869 Henry Hayman

1869–1872 James Stephen Hodson

1872–1878 Francis Abraham Souper

1878–1880 Charles Thomas Crutwell

1880–1910 Herbert Branston Gray

1910–1919 Harold Costley-White

1915-1928 Robert Douglas Beloe

1928-1940 Eric Edward Allen Whitworth

1940-1955 John D. Hills

1955–1964 Anthony Chenevix-Trench

1964–1971 Michael Hoban

1971-1985 Anthony Oliver Herbert Quick

1985-2003 Peter B. Smith

2003-2011 Peter J.M. Roberts

2011–2015 Simon Henderson

2015–2025 Dr Christopher Stevens

2025- Jeremy Quartermain

=== Current head ===
In December 2024, after a selection process, the Warden of the college announced that Jeremy Quartermain would succeed Stevens as Headmaster at the beginning of the 2025/26 academic year. Quartermain was formerly headmaster of Rossall School, previously holding positions at Brentwood and Gresham's.

== Other information ==
In September 2010 the Blackburn Science Centre was opened. The building includes green elements such as a bio-mass boiler, green roof and solar panels.

Since September 2012 Bradfield has offered the International Baccalaureate Diploma Programme (IBDP) alongside the traditional A Level pathway.

In Summer 2023 Bradfield received an outstanding inspection report from the Independent Schools Inspectorate.

The oldest building is college gateway, which incorporates part of a barn of 1382. The wrought iron was made by the village blacksmith.

In 2019 the last service was held at St Andrew's Church, with the college subsequently purchasing the building from the Diocese of Oxford, before then being deconsecrated. The Church is the location where the Duchess of Cornwall was baptised. The college has now completed converting it into a secondary library and working space as part of an £8m project. Construction commenced in April 2022, with the building being opened in September 2024 by Louis de Bernières.

Each August, the college serves as the 'base camp' for the Bradfield Ringing Course, which aims to improve the standard of change-ringing in the United Kingdom.

=== Southern Railway Schools Class ===
The 24th steam locomotive (Engine 923) in the Southern Railway's class V was originally named 'Uppingham', but after objections from Uppingham School the name was changed to 'Bradfield'. This class was known as the Schools Class because all 40 of the locomotives were named after English public schools. 'Uppingham' was built in December 1933 and had its name changed to 'Bradfield' on 14 August 1934.

== Notable alumni ==
Alumni include three Victoria Cross winners, a Nobel Prize Laureate, and senior members of government including a former Secretary of State for Defence, and Foreign Secretary.

== Notable staff ==
- Weston Bate, Australian historian
- Anthony Chenevix-Trench, headmaster 1955–1963, subsequently headmaster of Eton College and Fettes College
- Harold Costley-White, Anglican priest and headmaster, subsequently head of Westminster School
- Albert David (1867–1950) Anglican priest, schoolmaster and bishop
- Marshal of the Royal Air Force Charles Elworthy, Baron Elworthy, school governor
- Sir Ronald Aylmer Fisher (1890–1962) statistician, evolutionary biologist, geneticist, and eugenicist
- Herbert Branston Gray, headmaster from 1880 to 1910
- Ronald Groves, Master of Dulwich College from 1954 to 1966
- John Harvey, cricket coach and groundsman
- Henry Hayman, headmaster from 1868 to 1869
- Simon Henderson, headmaster from 2011 to 2015
- Michael Hoban, headmaster 1964–1971, subsequently headmaster of Harrow School
- James Stephen Hodson (1816–1890) who had served as Rector of Edinburgh Academy from 1854 to 1869
- Henry Jollye (1841–1902), assistant master, first-class cricketer
- Peter Jones, Languages master and soccer coach
- Vinnie Jones, formerly worked in the college kitchens
- General Sir Peter Leng, British Army officer and Master-General of the Ordnance
- Bertram Luard-Selby (1853–1918), composer and cathedral organist
- Denis Richards, teacher and RAF historian.
- Major-General Michael Scott, (born 1941) is a British Army officer and former Military Secretary (United Kingdom).
- John Shaw (former field hockey player and coach)
- Eva Ruth Spalding, composer and violin teacher
- Christopher Steel (1938–1991) British composer of contemporary classical music
- William Beach Thomas, later a war correspondent and writer on rural affairs
- Jonathan Saunders, English teacher and housemaster of Stone House
- Ann Schlee, an English novelist. She won the annual Guardian Children's Fiction Prize for The Vandal (1979)

== See also ==
- Independent school (UK)
- List of independent schools in the United Kingdom
