= William Lawrence =

William or Bill Lawrence may refer to:

== Arts and entertainment ==
- W. E. Lawrence (1896–1947), American silent film actor
- Bill Lawrence (news personality) (1916–1972), American print and television journalist
- Bill Lawrence (guitar maker) (1931–2013), German-American recording artist and guitar maker
- Bill Lawrence (TV producer) (born 1968), American television producer, director, writer and program creator

== Law and politics ==
=== United Kingdom ===
- William Lawrence (Ripon MP) (c. 1723–1798), British politician
- William Lawrence (London MP) (1818–1897), British MP for City of London
- William Lawrence (Conservative politician) (1844–1935), British MP for Liverpool Abercromby

=== United States ===
- William T. Lawrence (politician) (1788–1859), American congressman from New York
- William Caldwell Anderson Lawrence (died 1860), American politician in Pennsylvania
- William Beach Lawrence (1800–1881), American lawyer, diplomat, historian and politician in Rhode Island
- William Lawrence (Michigan politician) (born 1990), U.S. congressman-elect
- William Lawrence (Ohio Democrat) (1814–1895), U.S. congressman
- William Lawrence (Ohio Republican) (1819–1899), U.S. congressman
- William A. Lawrence (Wisconsin politician) (1822–1890), American legislator in Wisconsin
- William Miner Lawrence (1861–1935), American politician in New York
- William T. Lawrence (judge) (born 1947), United States federal judge
- William Lawrence (Kentucky politician)

=== Elsewhere ===
- William Lawrence (Australian politician) (1906–2004), Australian politician for Wimmera

== Nobility ==
- Sir William Lawrence, 1st Baronet (1783–1867), English physician, author and philosopher; Serjeant Surgeon to the Queen
- Sir William Lawrence, 3rd Baronet (1870–1934), English horticulturalist, hospital administrator and collector
- Sir William Lawrence, 4th Baronet (1913–1986), English businessman; served as major in World War II
- Sir William Lawrence, 5th Baronet (1954–2015), English noble, served on Stratford-upon-Avon District Council

== Sports ==
- Bill Lawrence (baseball) (1906–1997), American baseball player
- Bill Lawrence (cricketer) (born 1963), New Zealand cricketer
- Trevor Lawrence (William Trevor Lawrence; born 1999), American football quarterback

== Others ==
- William Lawrence (1723–1780), American Congregational minister
- William Effingham Lawrence (1781–1841), English-Australian landowner
- William Dawson Lawrence (1817–1886), Irish-Canadian shipbuilder, businessman and politician
- William Van Duzer Lawrence (1842–1927), American pharmaceutical and real estate mogul
- William Lawrence (bishop) (1850–1941), American Episcopal bishop of Massachusetts
- William Witherle Lawrence (1876–1936), American philologist and professor of English
- William Appleton Lawrence (1889–1968), American Episcopal bishop of Western Massachusetts, son of the above
- William P. Lawrence (1930–2005), American naval aviator, superintendent of U.S. Naval Academy
- William Ridgway Lawrence (1840–1923), American judge

== Other uses ==
- William D. Lawrence (ship), an 1874 full-rigged sailing ship
- USS William P. Lawrence, an Arleigh Burke-class destroyer in the United States Navy

== See also ==
- Billy Lawrence (born 1971), American female singer, songwriter, record producer and arranger
- Bill Laurance (born 1981), English composer, producer, and musician
- William L. Laurence (1888–1977), Lithuanian-American science journalist for The New York Times (1930–64)
