= Lawrence baronets of Ealing Park (1867) =

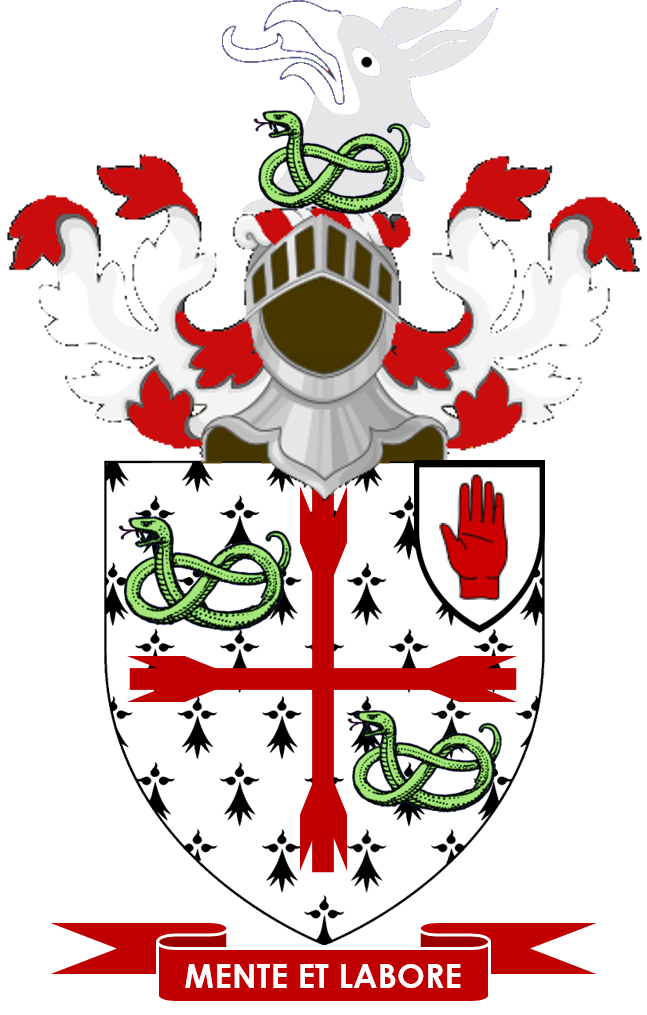
Arms: Ermine a Cross Raguly Gules in the 1st and 4th quarters a Serpent nowed proper; Crest: A Griffin's Head couped Argent in front thereof a Serpent nowed proper; Motto: Mente Et Labore (By mind and work)

The Lawrence baronetcy, of Ealing Park in the County of Middlesex, was created in the Baronetage of the United Kingdom on 30 April 1867 for William Lawrence, FRS, Serjeant-Surgeon to Queen Victoria since 1857.

The 2nd Baronet, Sir Trevor Lawrence, sat as Member of Parliament for Surrey Mid and Reigate and was a noted horticulturalist. The 3rd Baronet, also a horticulturalist, was a hospital administrator and collector. The 4th Baronet worked in industry in the Midlands. The 5th Baronet was chairman of Stratford-on-Avon Council and of the Heart of England Tourist Board.

As of 2026 Official Roll marks the baronetcy dormant.

== Lawrence baronets, of Ealing Park (1867) ==
- Sir William Lawrence, 1st Baronet (1783–1867)
- Sir James John Trevor Lawrence, 2nd Baronet (1831–1913)
- Sir William Matthew Trevor Lawrence, 3rd Baronet (1870–1934)
- Sir William Lawrence, 4th Baronet (1913–1986)
- Sir William Fettiplace Lawrence, 5th Baronet (1954–2015)
- Sir Aubrey Lyttelton Simon Lawrence, presumed 6th Baronet (born 1942). His name does not appear on the Official Roll.

The heir apparent is the current holder's son Thomas Lyttelton de Froidmont Lawrence (born 1985).
