= Sir Trevor Lawrence, 2nd Baronet =

British surgeon, politician and horticulturalist (1831–1913)

Sir Trevor Lawrence Bt KCVO KStJ
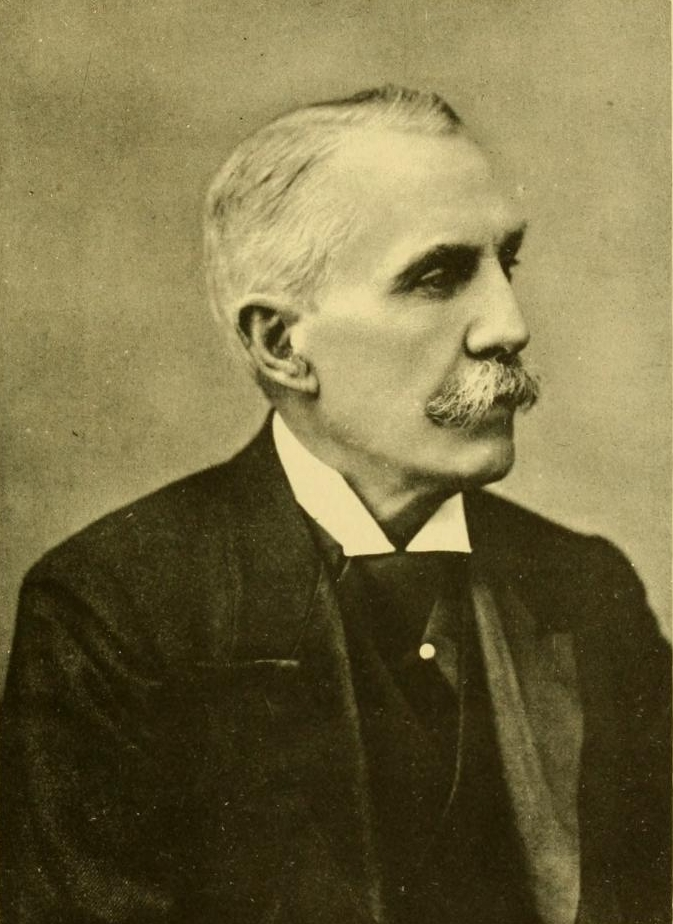
- Born: James John Trevor Lawrence; 30 December 1831
- Died: 22 December 1913 (aged 81); Burford Lodge, Dorking, Surrey
- Education: Winchester College; St Bartholomew's Hospital
- Occupations: Surgeon, politician, horticulturalist
- Spouse: Elizabeth Matthew
- Children: William Matthew Trevor Lawrence, Aubrey Trevor Lawrence, Charles Trevor Lawrence, Bessie Mary Lawrence
- Parents: Sir William Lawrence (father); Louisa Senior (mother)

Sir James John Trevor Lawrence, 2nd Baronet, KCVO, KStJ (30 December 1831 – 22 December 1913) was an English surgeon, horticulturalist, and art collector. He later became a Conservative Member of Parliament (MP) for 17 years, retiring to become treasurer of St Bartholomew's Hospital where he founded the Lawrence Scholarship and contributed to the King Edward's Hospital Fund.

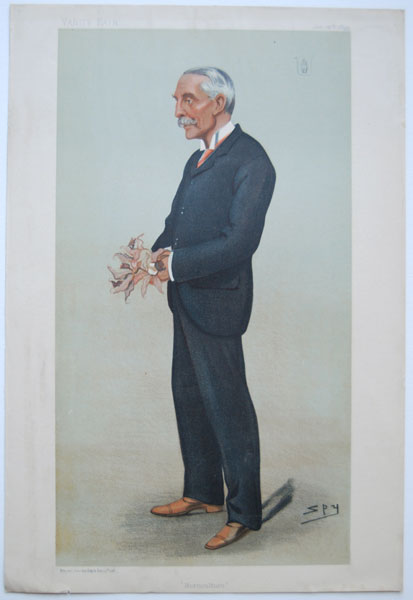
Caricature of Sir Trevor Lawrence by SPY (Sir Leslie Ward), Vanity Fair, 1899

During his time as MP he became president of the Royal Horticultural Society serving 28 years until death, overseeing a growth in interest in membership and horticulture in general across the British Empire. He is the inspiration for a hybrid Aril Iris, Iris Sir Trevor Lawrence and a genus of orchids, Trevoria. The society also founded a gold medal in his honour.

== Childhood and early adulthood ==
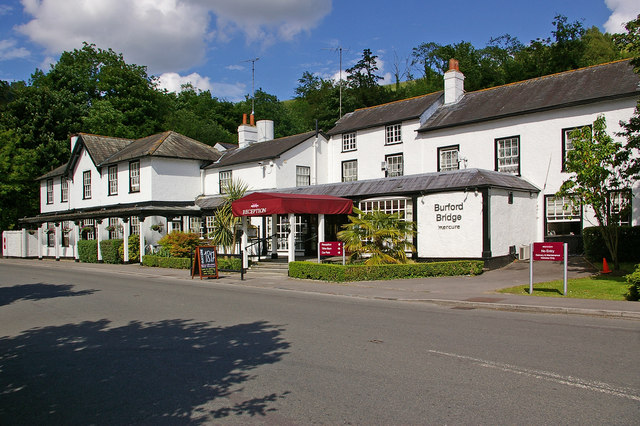
Burford Bridge Hotel, extended by the family

Lawrence was born on 30 December 1831, the son of Louisa Senior and Sir William Lawrence. His mother was the daughter of a successful Mayfair haberdasher who had bought a country estate, Broughton House, near Aylesbury, Buckinghamshire. (Note: He was christened in April 1883 at St Martin-in-the-Fields, Westminster.) He was educated at Winchester College and St Bartholomew's Hospital, where he took the diploma of MRCS in 1853. He then worked for nearly ten years for the Indian Medical Service. Having inherited his mother's particular love for orchids, he reinforced this interest while in India. He made his first collection when living at Dharamsala in the Himalayan foothills.

On 5 July 1867, Lawrence succeeded to his father's recently created baronetcy (see Lawrence Baronets). In 1869 he married Elizabeth, daughter of John Matthew, a partner in the leading firm of marine engineers, John Penn and Son of Greenwich. Elizabeth inherited Burford Lodge, Dorking, where they created a celebrated garden at the foot of Box Hill. (Note: At the time, the Burford Lodge estate included the Burford Bridge Hotel.) They had three sons and one daughter:

- William Matthew Trevor Lawrence (17 September 1870 – 4 January 1934); married Iris Eyre Crabbe (1908) and had issue.
- Bessie Mary Lawrence (11 November 1877 – 12 March 1944); married Henry Rottenburg (1911) and had issue.
- Aubrey Trevor Lawrence (15 January 1879 – 23 March 1930); married Constance Emily Fanning McGaw (1901) and had issue.
- Charles Trevor Lawrence (18 September 1881 – 10 April 1953); married Adeliza Donnelly (1916).

== Political career ==
In 1874 he unsuccessfully contested Gloucester as a Conservative, however in 1875 he was elected for Mid-Surrey, which included a large portion of south London. He sat for that constituency for ten years until its abolition in the redistribution of seats in 1885, when he was elected for Reigate Division in Surrey, a seat he held for seven years. He did not seek re-election at the 1892 general elections. He confined himself in parliament largely to questions and speeches on constituency matters, such as the abolition of tolls on bridges over the River Thames, and matters of public health - he was a strong supporter of vaccinations. He made 20 contributions reaching Hansard, spanning 1886-8 and 1892.

== Horticulture ==
Lawrence's chief interest, however, was horticulture, an interest he had inherited from his mother, herself a horticulturalist of note. From 1885 to 1913 he was President of the Royal Horticultural Society which increased greatly in numbers and means during this term. He was determined that it should be restored "to horticulture pure and simple", rather than entertaining the public. He was chiefly responsible for moving the Society from its expensive Kensington site to a more practical home in Westminster in 1904. The Society presented him with the Victoria Medal in 1900, a portrait painted by Sir Hubert Herkomer in 1906, and the Veitch Gold Memorial Medal 1913. The Society founded the Lawrence Gold Medal in his honour.

He was one of the world's leading orchid collectors. He employed several botanical artists to record his orchid collections including John Nugent Fitch, John Livingston Macfarlane and Nellie Roberts. He asked his wife to give plants of botanical interest to Kew after his death: 580 were thought to qualify. He presided at the Royal Horticultural Society conference on hybridisation in 1899, which is now officially regarded as the first international conference on genetics.

In 1905, Professor M. Foster named a hybrid Aril Iris after him, a cross between Iris iberica X Iris pallida. Also Clematis texensis 'Sir Trevor Lawrence', Tulipa 'Sir Trevor Lawrence' and Begonia were also named after him. A genus of orchids, Trevoria, bears his name as well.

== Hospital body contributions ==
In 1892 he succeeded Sir Sydney Waterlow as treasurer of St Bartholomew's Hospital and held the office for 12 years. In that time he founded the Lawrence Scholarship in memory of his father, and was a member of the Council of King Edward's Hospital Fund also making donations.

He was created a Knight Commander of the Royal Victorian Order (KCVO) in the November 1902 Birthday Honours list, and was invested with the insignia by King Edward VII at Buckingham Palace on 18 December 1902. He was also a Knight of Grace of the Order of St John of Jerusalem.

== Artworks legacy ==
He was a well-known collector of objets d'art, particularly oriental, especially Japanese, art, western porcelain, and old lace. Some of his collections are now in the Victoria and Albert Museum and other museums.

== Death ==
He died at Burford Lodge. His will was sworn in 1914 at £13,580 (equivalent to about £1,400,000 in 2025).

== See also ==
- Lawrence Baronets

== Bibliography ==
- Boyle, Frederick. About Orchids: A Chat. 1893.
- Elliott, Brent. History of the Royal Horticultural Society 1804–2004. London: Phillimore, 2004
- Kidd, Charles, Williamson, David (editors). Debrett's Peerage and Baronetage (1990 edition). New York: St Martin's Press, 1990,
- Leigh Rayment's list of baronets
- Leigh Rayment's Historical List of MPs
- Burkes Peerage and Baronetage (2003), s.v. Lawrence, Baronets, of Ealing Park
- http://livesonline.rcseng.ac.uk/biogs/E000014b.htm
- "SIR TREVOR LAWRENCE, Bart., K.C.V.O., M.R.C.S". British Medical Journal. 1 (2767): 121–122. 1914. doi:10.1136/bmj.1.2767.121. PMC 2300350.

Parliament of the United Kingdom
Preceded by Sir Henry Peek, Bt. Richard Baggallay	Member of Parliament for Mid Surrey; 1875–1885; With: Sir Henry Peek, Bt. to 1874; Sir John Ellis, Bt. from 1874	Constituency abolished
New constituency	Member of Parliament for Reigate; 1885–1892	Succeeded by Henry Cubitt
Baronetage of the United Kingdom
Preceded by William Lawrence	Baronet (of Ealing Park); 1867–1913	Succeeded by William Matthew Trevor Lawrence
