= Aubrey Lawrence =

British lawyer (1875–1930)

Aubrey Trevor Lawrence, MBE, KC (15 January 1875 – 23 March 1930) was a successful English barrister and author.

Lawrence was born 15 January 1875, the son of Sir Trevor Lawrence, 2nd Baronet and his wife Elizabeth, Lady Lawrence. He was educated at Shrewsbury and at Christ Church, Oxford where he took a first class degree in Greats. When he left university he was called to the Bar.

Lawrence was a member of Inner Temple. He shared his chambers – Essex Court Chambers – with a young Stafford Cripps (his second cousin) and was appointed King's Counsel in 1927. Lawrence was appointed as a member of The Most Excellent Order of the British Empire for his legal work. He was also the author of numerous books, such as 'A practical treatise on the law relating to the church and clergy', a work he wrote with a young Cripps.

Alongside his legal work, Lawrence was a successful local politician. He was Chancellor of the Dioceses of: Sheffield in 1914, Worcester in 1920, Peterborough in 1922, Southwell in 1922, Winchester in 1924, Leicester in 1927 and Portsmouth in 1927. He was also a governor of Shrewsbury School.

On 8 June 1901, Lawrence married Emily Constance Fanning McGaw, an Irish heiress. Her father was Joseph McGaw, an Irish landowner who had sold his estates in Ireland to buy 300,000 acres (1,200 km^{2}) in Australia (earning himself the nickname the 'Bushwhacker'). By her he had two sons and one daughter:

- John Trevor Lawrence (18 January 1908 – 2 May 1963)
- Peter Stafford Hayden Lawrence (9 February 1913 – 18 March 2005); married Helena Frances Lyttelton (10 August 1940), daughter of G. W. Lyttelton (see Viscount Cobham), and had issue.
- Ruth Christian Lawrence (14 June 1904 – 31 March 1976; married 1934 Philip Olaf Buxton JP (see Buxton baronets) and had issue.

== See also ==
- Lawrence baronets
