= Louisa Lawrence =

English horticulturist

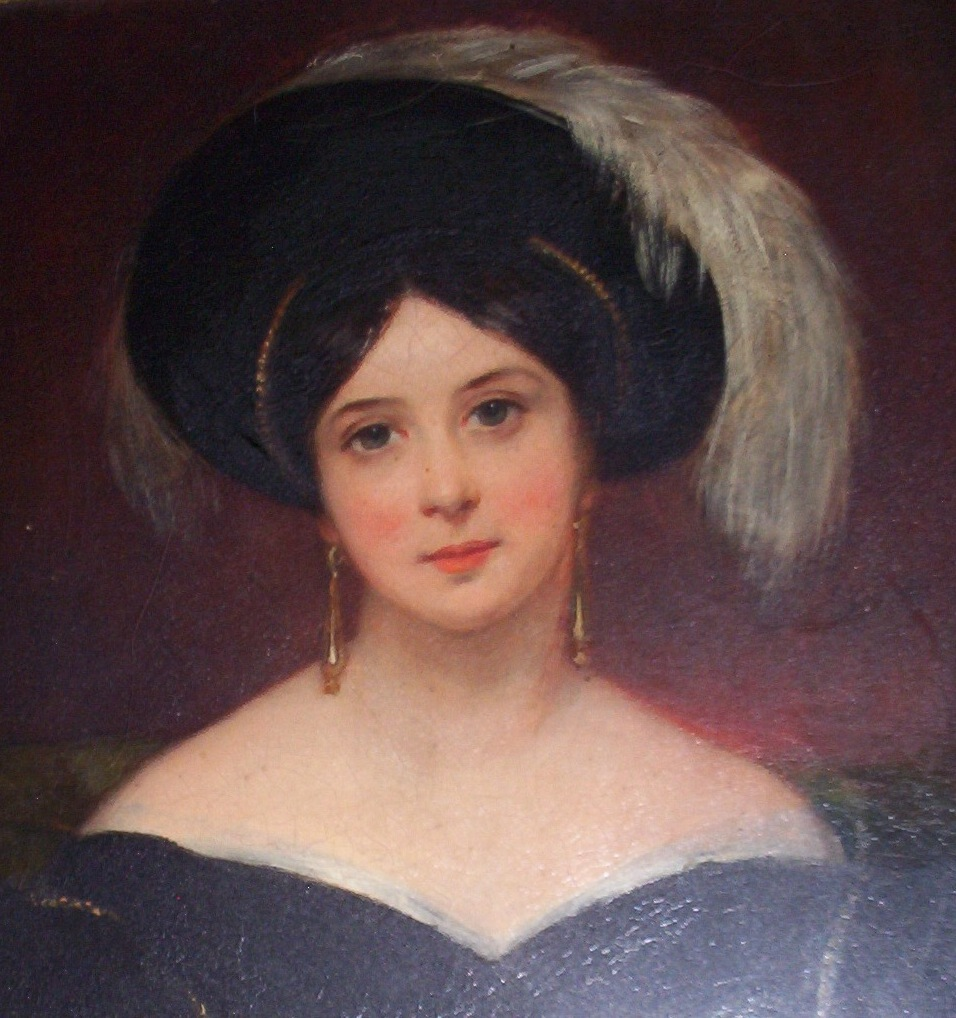
- Born: Louisa Senior; 1803; Broughton House, Aylesbury
- Died: 14 August 1855 (aged 51–52)
- Occupation: Horticulturalist
- Spouse: Sir William Lawrence, 1st Baronet
- Children: William James, John James Trevor, Mary Louisa, Louisa Elizabeth, Mary Wilhelmina
- Parents: James Senior (father); Elizabeth Ann Trevor (mother)

Louisa Trevor Lawrence (née Senior; 1803 – 14 August 1855) was an English horticulturist in the second quarter of the 19th century.

== Early life ==
Louisa Senior was born at Broughton House, on the outskirts of Aylesbury, to James Senior and Elizabeth Ann Trevor. Her father had made his money as a haberdasher in Bruton Street, Berkeley Square, London.

== Horticulture ==
Like her father, Louisa had social ambitions. After she married the surgeon William Lawrence in 1828 when she was 25 and he was 45, her social ambitions were gratified by horticulture, first in a villa with less than two acres at Drayton Green. In her comparatively small garden she cultivated over 200 orchids and over 500 varieties of roses, long before hybrid tea roses and perpetuals were fashionable. There were Italian pollarded walks, rock work including a rustic arch (with Cupid), a French parterre, a span-roofed greenhouse, a stove and an orchid house. By 1838 a detailed account of this model of what a suburban garden could be made into was published in The Gardener’s Magazine.

In June 1838, her husband purchased the Ealing Park mansion along with the surrounding 100 acres known as "Little Ealing" (then in Middlesex) at a purchase price of £9,000 (equivalent to £863,000 in 2025). Ealing Park is described by Pevsner as "Low and long; nine bays with pediment over the centre and an Ionic one-storeyed colonnade all along." The property was grandly furnished, as may be seen from the catalogue of the sale of the contents after her death. The estate boasted livestock, including poultry of all sorts, cows, sheep and pigs. There were thousands of bedding plants, “stove plants”, more than 600 plants in early forcing houses, nearly a hundred camellias, and more.

An indication of Lawrence's celebrity is that two influential gardening books were dedicated to her in the early 1840s. In 1841 Mrs Loudon, wife of the editor of The Gardener's Magazine, wrote The Ladies' Companion to the Flower Garden, being an Alphabetical Arrangement of all the ornamental plants usually grown in gardens and shrubberies, with full directions for their culture. She dedicated it to Mrs Lawrence of Ealing Park, Middlesex, “as a zealous patron of floriculture, an excellent botanist, and, above all, as one of the first lady-gardeners of the present day”. Vol. LXVIII of Curtis’s Botanical Magazine, the work of Sir William Jackson Hooker, the director of the Royal Botanic Garden was dedicated "with sentiments of great regard and esteem" to Mrs Lawrence, “the beauty of whose gardens and pleasure grounds and whose most successfully cultivated vegetable treasures are only equalled by the liberality with which they are shown to all who are in botany and horticulture.

Lawrence was extremely competitive, constantly winning prizes for herself and her gardens at shows organised by the Botanic Society, the Royal Horticultural Society, and others. One of her keenest rivals was Joseph Paxton, the Duke of Devonshire’s famous gardener at Chatsworth in Derbyshire. Paxton and the Duke visited Lawrence's estate in 1841, although it appears that Paxton did not like her. Lawrence's greatest triumph was in 1849, and very much over the Duke and Paxton. For eighty years or so botanists had been bringing back to Europe previously unknown plants from all over the world, and they were eagerly cultivated. There was a race among English horticulturists to produce the first flower of a beautiful tree from Burma, the Amherstia nobilis. Lawrence succeeded, sending the first spike to the Queen and the second to be engraved. A third spike was sent to Chatsworth, and it sent the Duke and Paxton into raptures at its beauty. She was also the first to grow the purple-blue climbing nasturtium, Tropaeolum azureum.

At Ealing Park, Lawrence's ambitions became even more serious, and she was even more definitely on the fashionable visiting circuit. In 1844 Carl Gustav Carus, doctor to the King of Saxony’s doctor, writing in his diary about Lawrence's husband, noted: "His wife is celebrated as one of the first flower cultivators in London, and possesses in particular a beautiful collection of orchideous plants, which we shall probably visit on some other occasion." The king’s party did go a few days later and Carus was amazed by both the flowers and the elegant grounds. Grander still was the visit of Queen Victoria, the Prince Consort, the King of the Belgians, and the Grand Duke of Mecklenburg-Strelitz, who planted the first trees in a planned avenue of deodars, the Himalayan cedar which had been introduced to England not long before, in 1831.

== Personal life ==
Louisa and William lived chiefly on Whitehall Place, St Martin in the Fields. They had two sons and three daughters. The elder son died in childhood; the younger, Trevor, became as celebrated a gardener as his mother, and was a president of the Royal Horticultural Society. One daughter died at age 18 months and the other two died unmarried.

1. William James (10 October 1829 – buried 5 November 1839)
2. John James Trevor (30 December 1831 – 22 December 1913)
3. Mary Louisa (28 August 1833 – buried 7 March 1835)
4. Louisa Elizabeth (22 February 1836 – 4 January 1920)
5. Mary Wilhelmina (1 November 1839 – 24 November 1920)

Louisa Lawrence died 14 August 1855. After Louisa's death, on 30 April 1867, her husband was made a Baronet, of Ealing Park. He died shortly afterward, on 5 July 1867. Their son, who succeeded his father as the second Baronet, later sold Ealing Park.
