= Sir William Lawrence, 4th Baronet =

English baronet and businessman

Sir William Lawrence, 4th Baronet FRHS (14 July 1913 – 3 November 1986) was an English baronet and businessman.

Lawrence was born on 14 July 1913, the son of Sir William Lawrence and his wife Iris, youngest daughter of Brigadier-General Eyre Crabbe. He was educated at Bradfield College. On 20 January 1940 he married Zoe Pether, daughter of Henry Stedham Stanley Pether. They divorced without issue five years later. On 10 July 1945 he married Pamela Mary, daughter of James Edgar Gordon and by her had a son and two daughters.

On 4 January 1924 he succeeded to his father's baronetcy (see Lawrence Baronets).

Lawrence was a Major in the East Surrey Regiment during the Second World War and was Senior Executive of Wilmot Breeden Ltd, an automotive parts production company.

== See also ==
- Lawrence Baronets

Baronetage of the United Kingdom
Preceded by William Matthew Trevor Lawrence	Baronet (of Ealing Park); 1934–1986	Succeeded by William Fettiplace Lawrence
