= Mann baronets of Thelveton Hall (1905) =

Escutcheon of the Mann baronets of Thelveton Hall

The Mann baronetcy, of Thelveton Hall in Thelveton in the County of Norfolk, was created in the Baronetage of the United Kingdom on 29 December 1905 for Edward Mann, a brewer and the first mayor of Stepney in 1900. He was Chairman of Mann, Crossmann & Paulin, Ltd, brewers, and of Brandon's Putney Brewery Ltd..

== Mann baronets, of Thelveton Hall (1905) ==
- Sir Edward Mann, 1st Baronet (1854–1943)
- Sir (Edward) John Mann, 2nd Baronet (1883–1971)
- Sir Rupert Edward Mann, 3rd Baronet (born 1946).

The heir apparent is the present holder's son Alexander Rupert Mann (born 1978).

== Notes ==
Baronetage of the United Kingdom
Preceded by Mackworth-Praed baronets	Mann baronets of Thelveton Hall; 29 December 1905	Succeeded by Milburn baronets
