= Walker baronets of Pembroke House (1906) =

Baronetcy (extant) in Ireland

Escutcheon of the Walker baronets of Pembroke House

The Walker baronetcy, of Pembroke House in Dublin, was created in the Baronetage of the United Kingdom on 2 July 1906 for the Irish lawyer Samuel Walker. He was a Member of Parliament for Londonderry, Solicitor-General for Ireland, Attorney-General for Ireland and eventually Lord Chancellor of Ireland.

The 5th Baronet died childless in 2006, and was succeeded by his younger brother.

== Walker baronets, of Pembroke House (1906) ==
- Sir Samuel Walker, 1st Baronet (1832–1911)
- Sir Alexander Arthur Walker, 2nd Baronet (1857–1932)
- Sir Cecil Edward Walker, 3rd Baronet (1882–1964)
- Sir Hugh Ronald Walker, 4th Baronet (1925–2004)
- Sir Robert Cecil Walker, 5th Baronet (1974–2006)
- Sir Roy Edward Walker, 6th Baronet (born 10 August 1977)

There is no heir to the title.

== Notes ==
Baronetage of the United Kingdom
Preceded by Milburn baronets	Walker baronets of Pembroke House; 2 July 1906	Succeeded by Lawrence baronets
