= Sir William Lawrence, 3rd Baronet =

English horticulturalist, hospital administrator and collector (1870–1934)

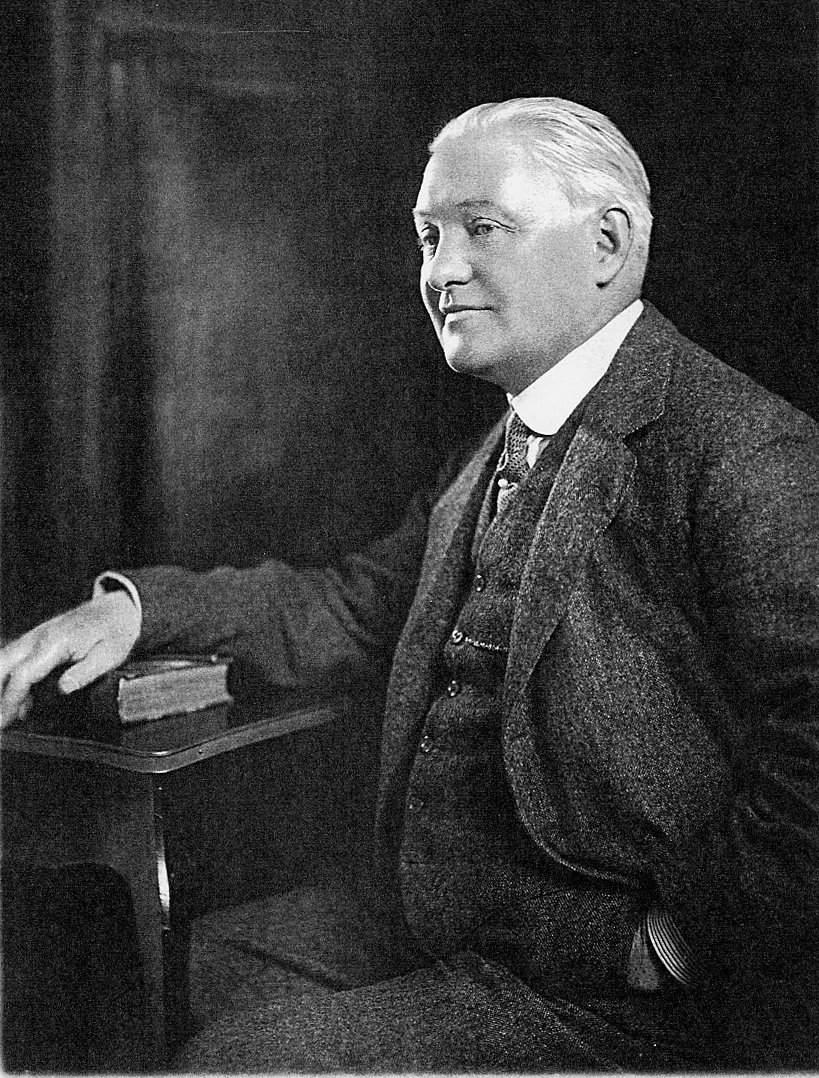
Photograph of Sir William Lawrence

Sir William Matthew Trevor Lawrence, 3rd Baronet JP FSA (17 September 1870 – 4 January 1934) was an English horticulturalist, hospital administrator and collector.

== Early life ==
Lawrence was born on 17 September 1870, the son of Elizabeth Matthew and Sir Trevor Lawrence. He was educated at Bradfield College and at New College, Oxford.

On 24 February 1908 he married Iris Eyre, daughter of Brigadier-general Eyre Macdonell Stewart Crabbe, CB, and by her had two sons and three daughters. His eldest daughter, Barbara, married Alfred Gordon Clark, a county court judge and crime writer as Cyril Hare, and his second daughter, Anne, was the mother of Rose Gray, of The River Cafe. On 22 December 1913 he succeeded to his father's baronetcy (see Lawrence Baronets).

== Career ==
Lawrence studied chemistry at the University of Oxford, graduating with a third class degree. He continued his studies in Heidelberg, and then Berlin where he undertook a doctorate. On returning to the UK he spent five years at Owens College, Manchester, working as a demonstrator and later an assistant lecturer in chemistry. In 1902 he took up a position as a junior inspector with the Board of Education, becoming a senior examiner in 1912.

However succeeding in 1913 to his father's title and estate at Burford, Dorking, freed him to live a public life, especially in the fields of horticulture, medical administration, and the collection of objects of fine art.

During the First World War he served for a time with the Prisoners of War information bureau. Later he was attached to the Admiralty war staff, and then to the Intelligence branch of the War Office.

Both Lawrence's father and grandfather had been important medical figures; his grandfather, Sir William Lawrence, was a pioneering surgeon based chiefly at St Bartholomew's Hospital and Serjeant-Surgeon to Queen Victoria, and his father, Sir Trevor Lawrence MP, chaired the Central Hospital Council and was treasurer of St Bartholomew's Hospital. Lawrence was Almoner of the same hospital, and died there suddenly while on hospital business.

Lawrence was a Justice of the Peace for Surrey.

== Horticulture ==
Lawrence's chief interest was horticulture, an interest he had inherited from his father and grandmother, both horticulturalists of note. He was, among other roles, President of the Alpine Garden Society, an officer of the Ordre du Merite Agricole, a winner of the Victoria Medal of Honour and vice-president of the Iris Society. Lady Lawrence was also a keen gardener, also winning the Victoria Medal of Honour in her own right.

He was Treasurer of the Royal Horticultural Society at the time of the building of its new hall in Westminster; in 2000 this was renamed the Lawrence Hall after him ("not forgetting Sir Trevor Lawrence", according to the Society's History).

== See also ==
- Lawrence Baronets

Baronetage of the United Kingdom
Preceded by James John Trevor Lawrence	Baronet (of Ealing Park); 1913–1934	Succeeded by William Lawrence
