= Peter Lawrence (teacher) =

British teacher (1913–2005)

- Born: 9 February 1913
- Died: 18 March 2005 (aged 92)
- Education: Christ Church, Oxford
- Employer(s): Doon School; Eton College
- Father: Aubrey Lawrence

Peter Stafford Hayden Lawrence (9 February 1913 – 18 March 2005) was British teacher at Eton College and the Doon School.

Lawrence was born on February 9, 1913, and was educated at Eton College. He was an oarsman in school and was appointed as Ninth Man in the Monarch, responsible for making sure that rowing races ran smoothly. He was the first secretary of the Eton Film Society and helped establish the school's printing press.

Lawrence began studying at Christ Church, Oxford, but frequently returned to teach at Eton. He also taught at the Doon School, which lead to the crown prince Birendra of Nepal attending Lawrence's house at Eton. Lawrence subsequently established a freelance agency to allow British boarding school graduates to teach at the Budhanilkantha School in Nepal during their gap year. In 1936, he began teaching mathematics and physics at Eton College and became an editor for the Eton College Fixtures journal. He also served on the local town council and lead first aid parties at the start of World War II.

He married his wife Helena in 1940 before serving as a radar officer in the Royal Naval Reserve, achieving the rank of lieutenant-commander. He then continued work at Eton, spending 17 years as a housemaster. He retired in 1977 and moved to Oxfordshire where he became a chairman of the Oxford Family History Society. He also edited works such as The Encouragement of Learning and Grizel Hartley Remembered, as well as obituaries in The Daily Telegraph. He also established the Eton Photographic Archive. He died in 2005.
