= Milburn baronets =

Baronetcy in the Baronetage of the United Kingdom

The Milburn baronetcy, of Guyzance in the Parish of Shilbottle in the County of Northumberland, is a title in the Baronetage of the United Kingdom. It was created on 30 December 1905 for John Davison Milburn, a shipowner and company director, High Sheriff of Northumberland that year.

== Milburn baronets, of Guyzance (1905) ==
- Sir John Davison Milburn, 1st Baronet (1851–1907)
- Sir Charles Stamp Milburn, 2nd Baronet (1878–1917)
- Sir Leonard John Milburn, 3rd Baronet (1884–1957), High Sheriff of Northumberland in 1928.
- Sir John Nigel Milburn, 4th Baronet (1918–1985)
- Sir Anthony Rupert Milburn, 5th Baronet (born 1947)

The heir apparent is the present holder's son Patrick Thomas Milburn (born 1980).

Baronetage of the United Kingdom
Preceded by Mann baronets	Milburn baronets of Guyzance; 30 December 1905	Succeeded by Walker baronets
