= Nixon baronets =

Baronetcy in the Baronetage of the United Kingdom

Escutcheon of the Nixon baronets of Roebuck Grove and Merrion Square

The Nixon baronetcy, of Roebuck Grove in Milltown in the County of Dublin and Merrion Square in the City of Dublin, is a title in the Baronetage of the United Kingdom. It was created on 14 July 1906 for the physician Sir Christopher Nixon. He was Professor of Anatomy and Physiology at the Catholic University of Ireland Medical School.

== Nixon baronets, of Roebuck Grove and Merrion Square (1906) ==
- Sir Christopher John Nixon, Kt., 1st Baronet (1849–1914)
- Sir Christopher William Nixon, DSO, 2nd Baronet (1877–1945)
- Sir Christopher John Louis Joseph Nixon, MC, 3rd Baronet (1918–1978)
- Sir Kenneth Michael John Basil Nixon, 4th Baronet (1919–1997)
- Sir Simon Michael Christopher Nixon, 5th Baronet (born 1954)

The heir presumptive is the present holder's brother Michael Hugh David Nixon (born 1957).

Baronetage of the United Kingdom
Preceded by Lawrence baronets	Nixon baronets of Roebuck Grove and Merrion Square; 14 July 1906	Succeeded by Schwann baronets
