= Clematis 'Princess Diana' =

Clematis cultivar

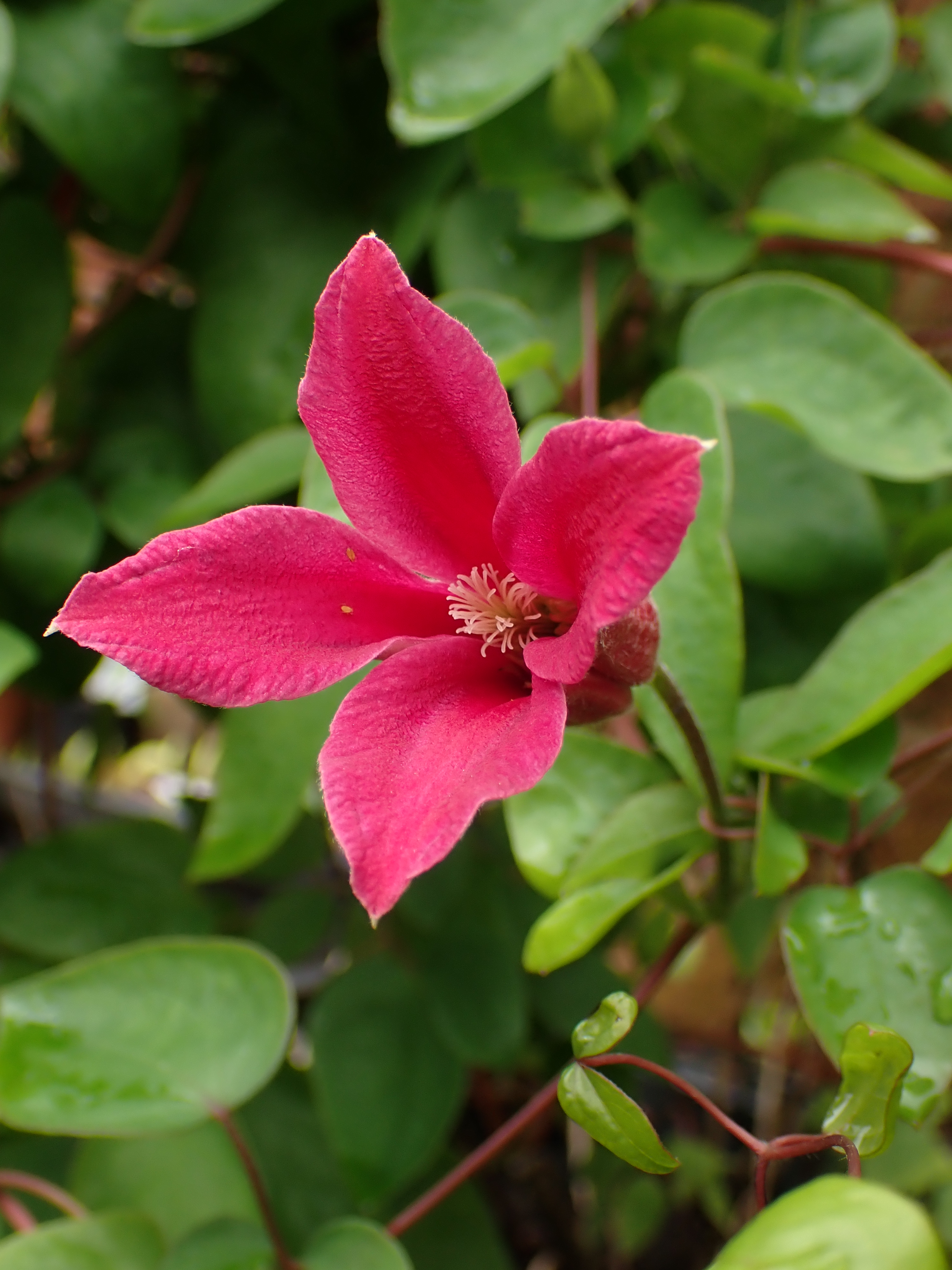
- Genus: Clematis
- Hybrid parentage: Clematis texensis × Clematis 'Bees Jubilee'
- Cultivar group: Clematis Texensis group
- Cultivar: 'Princess Diana'
- Breeder: Barry Fretwell
- Origin: Devon United Kingdom

Clematis 'Princess Diana' is a hybrid cultivar of Clematis, which was introduced in 1984. The cultivar was produced by British clematis breeder Barry Fretwell and named in honour of Diana, Princess of Wales. The cultivar was created by hybridizing Clematis texensis with the cultivar Clematis 'Bees Jubilee'. The Royal Horticultural Society awarded this cultivar with a prestigious Award of Garden Merit in 2002.

== Description ==
Clematis 'Princess Diana' is a deciduous climbing plant with a herbaceous habit. Stems will climb by twining their leaf petiole tendrils around surrounding objects. This cultivar can reach heights ranging from 250 – 400 cm tall when a suitable area to climb is available. Leaves are green and pinnately trifoliate. Plants will flower from early summer to autumn. Flowers are 6 cm long, tulip shaped and reddish-pink in colour. The flowers possess recurved petals and blooms contain cream and maroon stamens.

== Pests and diseases ==
Clematis 'Princess Diana' can be attacked by various species of aphid. Earwigs such as Forficula auricularia will also feed on the petals of the flowers. Caterpillars of the angle shades moth (Phlogophora meticulosa) and lesser yellow underwing moth (Noctua comes) also feed on the leaves of the plant.
