= Lawrence baronets of Sloane Gardens (1906) =

Escutcheon of the Lawrence baronets of Sloane Garden

The Lawrence baronetcy, of Sloane Gardens in Chelsea, was created in the Baronetage of the United Kingdom on 13 July 1906 for the administrator Walter Lawrence. He was Private Secretary to Lord Curzon, Viceroy of India from 1898 to 1905 and a member of the Council of India.

== Lawrence baronets, of Sloane Gardens (1906) ==
- Sir Walter Roper Lawrence, 1st Baronet (1857–1940)
- Sir Percy Roland Bradford Lawrence, 2nd Baronet (1886–1950)
- Sir David Roland Walter Lawrence, 3rd Baronet (1929–2002)
- Sir Clive Wyndham Lawrence, 4th Baronet (born 1939).

The heir apparent is the present holder's son James Wyndham Stuart Lawrence (born 1970).

== Notes ==
Baronetage of the United Kingdom
Preceded by Walker baronets	Lawrence baronets of Sloane Gardens; 13 July 1906	Succeeded by Nixon baronets
