= Sir William Lawrence, 5th Baronet =

English baronet and politician

Sir William Fettiplace Lawrence, 5th Baronet, OBE (23 August 1954 – 10 February 2015) was an English baronet and politician.

Lawrence was born on 23 August 1954, the son of Sir William Lawrence and his wife Pamela, Lady Lawrence. He was educated at King Edward VI School, Stratford-upon-Avon. He succeeded to his father's baronetcy in 1986 (see Lawrence Baronets). His unusual middle name came from the Fettiplace family from which the Lawrences were descended.

Lawrence filled numerous roles in his political career, specialising in the promotion of tourism in the Midlands. He was a member of the Stratford-on-Avon District Council from 1982, on the South Warwickshire General Hospital NHS Trust, a member of the Heart of England Tourist Board from 1989 (and Chairman after 1991), a governor of King Edward VI School and of Stratford-on-Avon Girls Grammar School, and a Governor of the Royal Shakespeare Theatre. He was also president of the British Toilet Association, campaigning for better toilet facilities for the disabled.

He was made an Officer of the Order of the British Empire in 2003 for services to the tourist industry, and an honorary MA of the University of Worcester.

He contracted polio at the age of three, and used a wheelchair for the rest of his life. He married February 2005 Tamara Bubashvili of Tbilisi, Georgia, b. 1977.

== See also ==
- Lawrence Baronets

Baronetage of the United Kingdom
Preceded by William Lawrence	Baronet (of Ealing Park); 1986–2015	Succeeded by Aubrey Lyttelton Simon Lawrence
