= Lawrence baronets of Iver (1628) =

Escutcheon of the Lawrence baronets of Iver

The Lawrence baronetcy, of Iver in the County of Buckingham, was created in the Baronetage of England on 9 October 1628 for John Lawrence, son of the London goldsmith Thomas Lawrence (died 1593). The title became extinct on the death of the 3rd Baronet in 1714.

== Lawrence baronets, of Iver (1628) ==
- Sir John Lawrence, 1st Baronet (c. 1589–1638)
- Sir John Lawrence, 2nd Baronet (11 May 1610 – 1658)
- Sir Thomas Lawrence, 3rd Baronet (c. 1645–1714), acting governor of Maryland.
