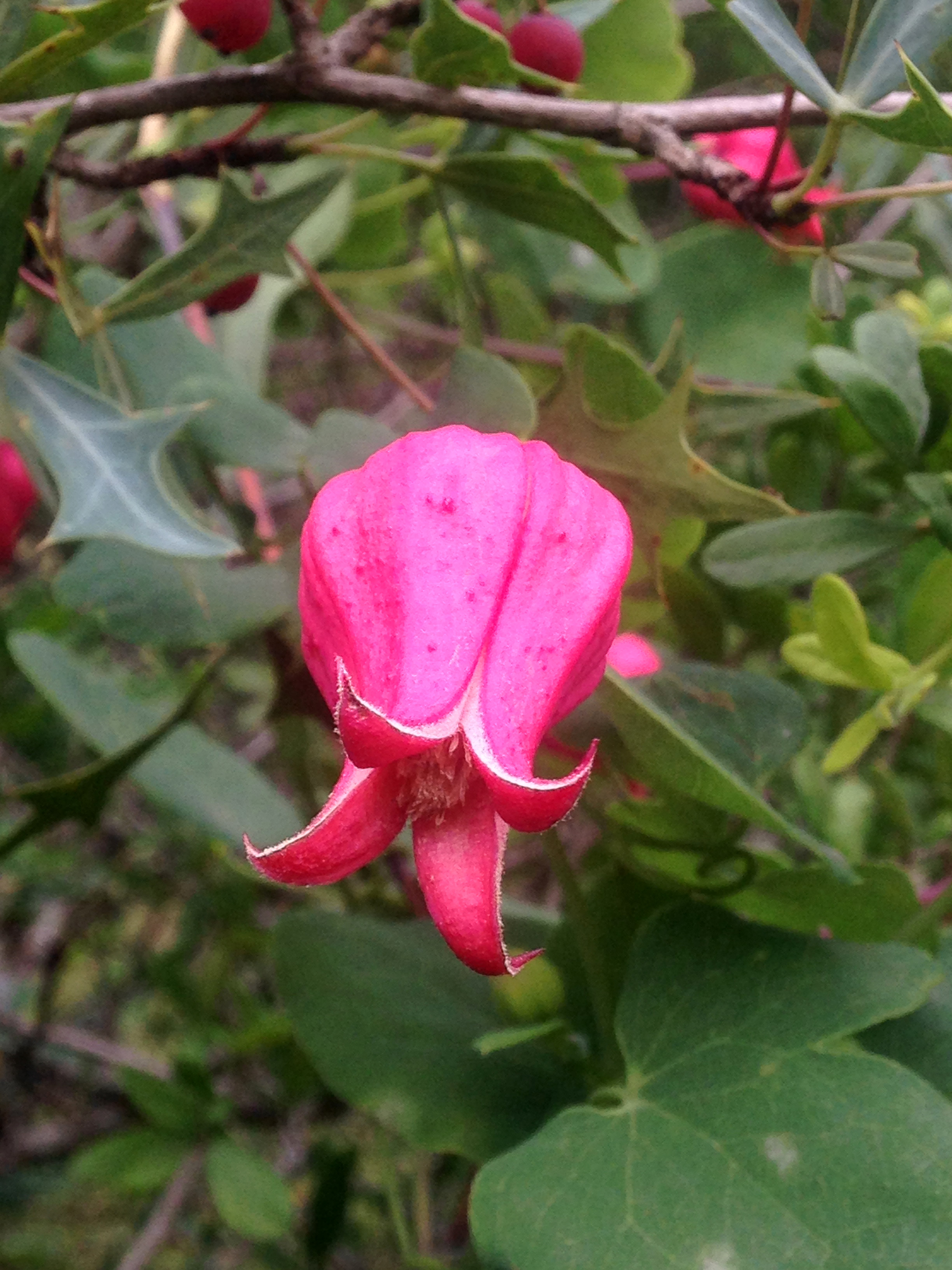

Scientific classification
- Kingdom: Plantae
- Clade: Embryophytes
- Clade: Tracheophytes
- Clade: Angiosperms
- Clade: Eudicots
- Order: Ranunculales
- Family: Ranunculaceae
- Subfamily: Ranunculoideae
- Tribe: Anemoneae
- Genus: Clematis
- Species: C. texensis

Binomial name
- Clematis texensis Buckley

= Clematis texensis =

Species of flowering plant in the buttercup family

Clematis texensis, commonly called scarlet leather flower, is a climbing vine in the buttercup family (Ranunculaceae). It is native to the United States, where it is endemic to the Edwards Plateau of Texas. Its natural habitat is on rocky limestone cliffs and streamsides.

== Description ==
This is an herbaceous and slightly woody vine that can climb to nine feet. It produces bell-shaped flowers in the spring and summer. The flower petals are thick and leather-like with scarlet-colored sepals. After the flower blooms, a feathery ball of plumed seeds will be displayed. This Clematis is very hardy and drought tolerant and when planted in sunny conditions, flowers may persist until the first frost.

== Cultivation ==
Crosses with other clematis varieties have yielded varieties showier than the species, such as "Duchess of Albany", "Princess Diana", "Gravetye Beauty", "Sir Trevor Lawrence", and "Etoile Rose", in colors from pink to dark scarlet red. Clematis texensis and its crosses tend to have four petals; blossoms resemble lily-flowered tulips, and sometimes display as downward-facing bells.

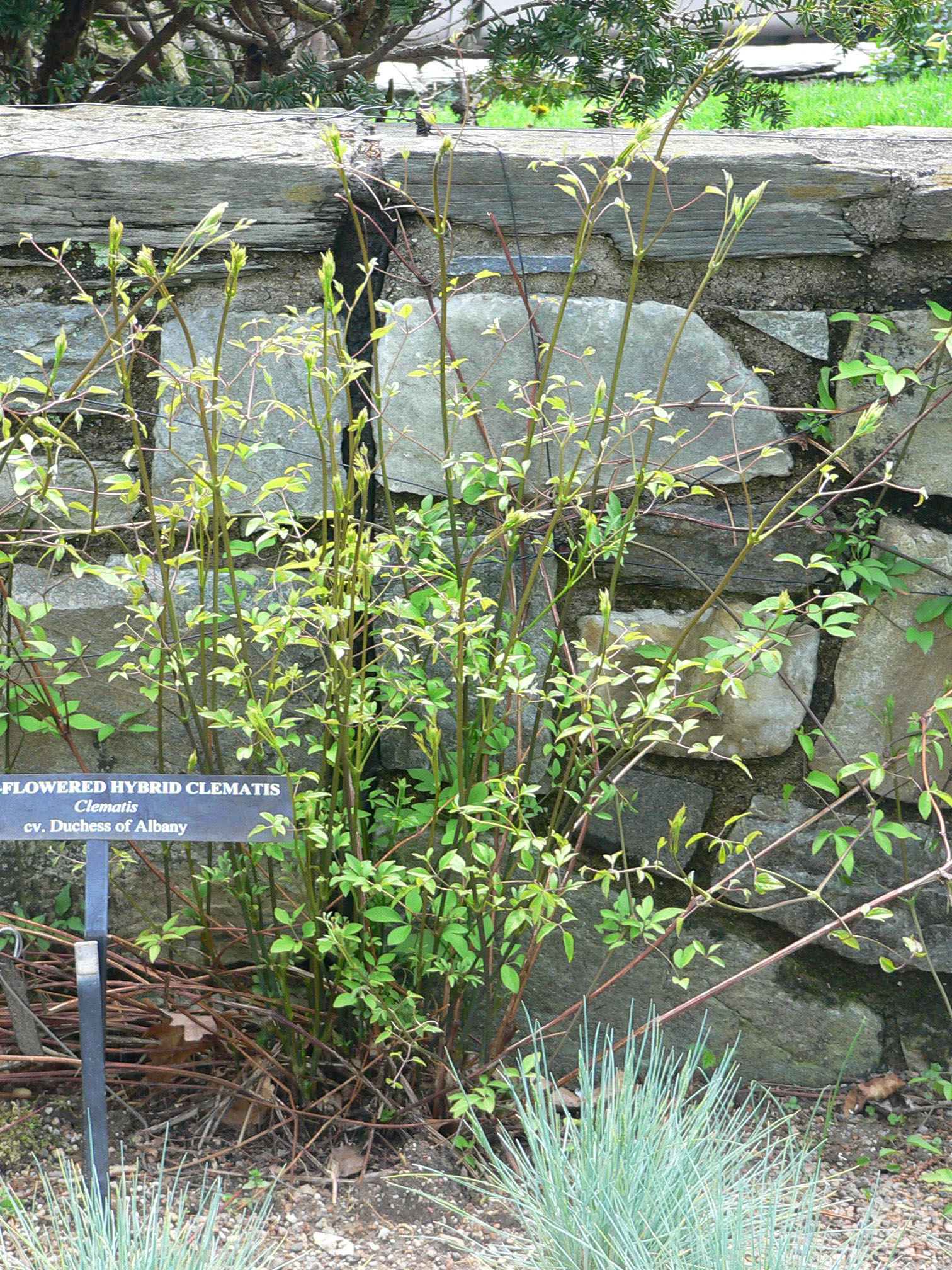
A hybrid of Clematis texensis in cultivation

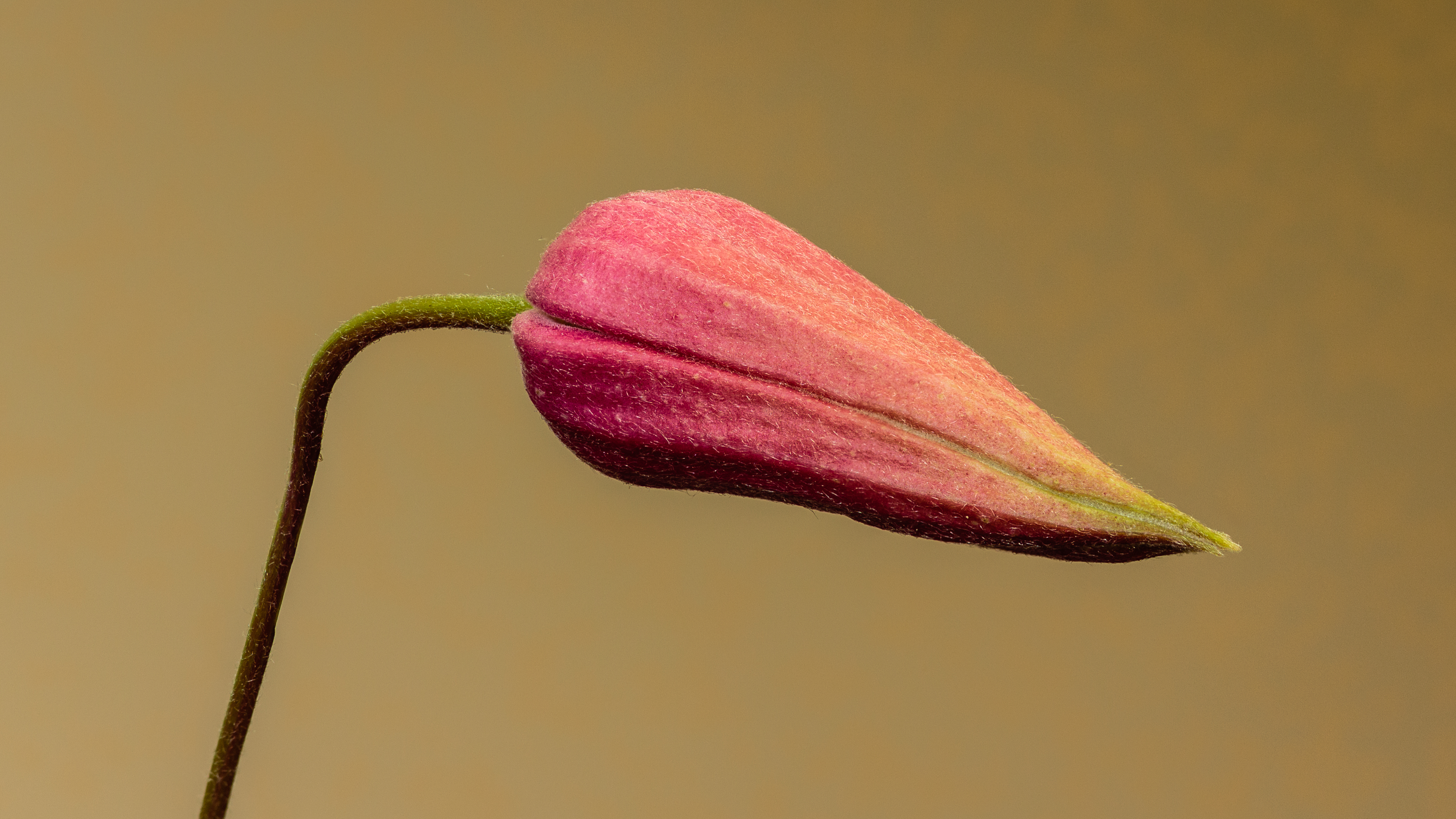
Flowerbud, Princess Diana variety

== Uses ==
Chop dried stems can be brewed into a tea that treats headaches and migraines. Historically, a tincture could be made to function as a counter-irritant that, when applied to the skin's surface, produces an irritation that counteracts an underlying discomfort.
