= Sir William Lawrence, 1st Baronet =

English surgeon (1783–1867)

Sir William Lawrence Bt
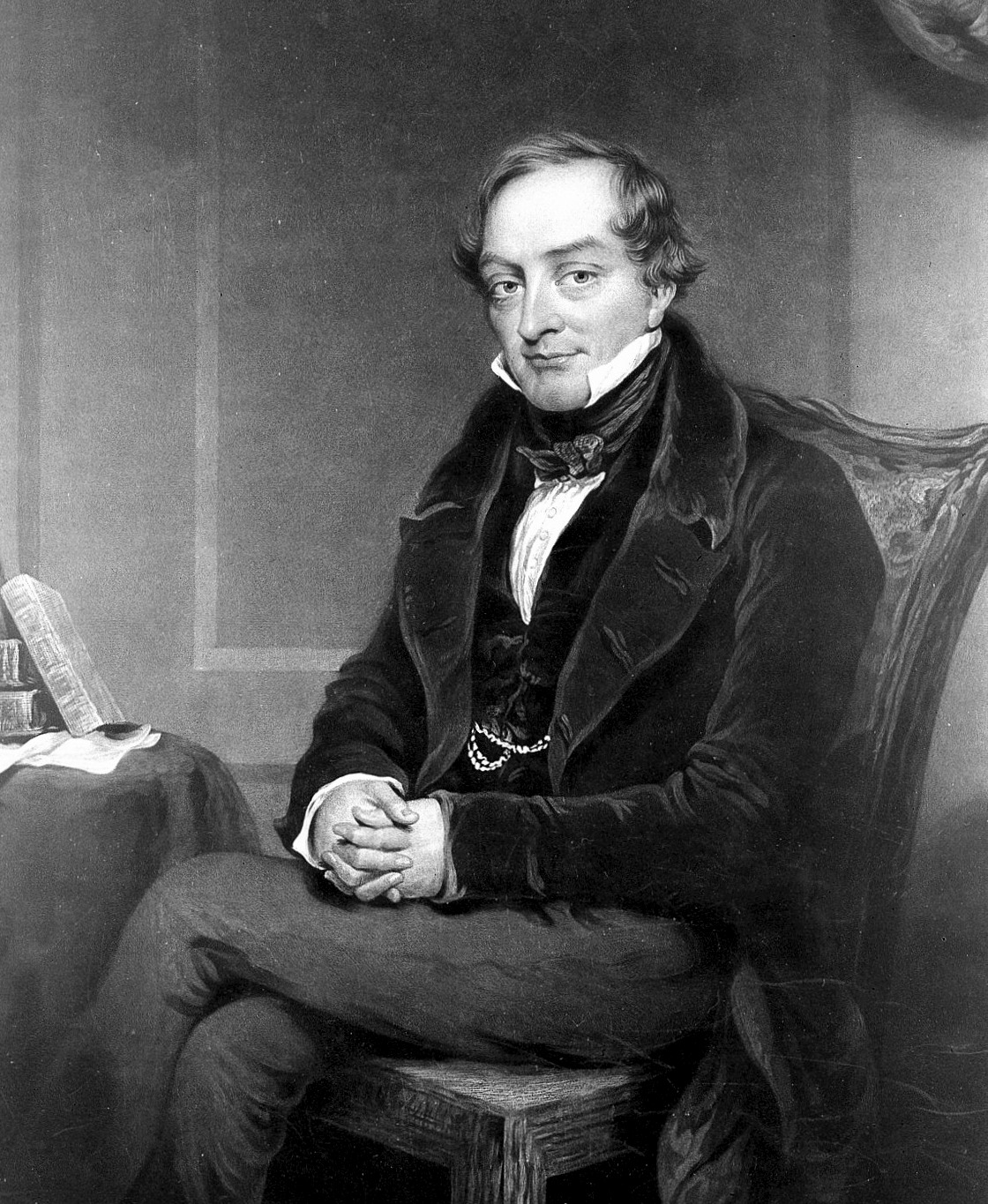
- William Lawrence in 1839

Personal details
- Born: 16 July 1783 Cirencester, Gloucestershire, England
- Died: 5 July 1867 (aged 83) Westminster, London, England
- Spouse: Louise Lawrence (m. 1828; died 1855)
- Children: Sir Trevor Lawrence, 2nd Baronet
- Education: Elmore Court School
- Profession: Surgeon

Sir William Lawrence, 1st Baronet FRCS FRS (16 July 1783 – 5 July 1867) was an English surgeon who became President of the Royal College of Surgeons of London and Serjeant Surgeon to the Queen.

In his mid-thirties, he published two books of his lectures which contained pre-Darwinian ideas on man's nature and, effectively, on evolution. He was forced to withdraw the second (1819) book after fierce criticism; the Lord Chancellor ruled it blasphemous. Lawrence's transition to respectability occurred gradually, and his surgical career was highly successful. In 1822, Lawrence was elected a member of the American Philosophical Society in Philadelphia. He was President of the Medical and Chirurgical Society of London in 1831.

Lawrence had a long and successful career as a surgeon. He reached the top of his profession, and just before his death in 1867, the Queen rewarded him with a baronetcy (see Lawrence baronets).

== Early life and education ==
Lawrence was born in Cirencester, Gloucestershire, the son of William Lawrence, the town's chief surgeon and physician, and Judith Wood. His father's side of the family was descended from the Fettiplace family; His great-great-grandfather (also William Lawrence) married Elizabeth Fettiplace, granddaughter of Sir Edmund Fettiplace. His younger brother Charles Lawrence was one of the founding members of the Royal Agricultural College at Cirencester.

He was educated at Elmore Court School in Gloucester. At 15, he was apprenticed to, and lived with, John Abernethy (FRS 1796) for five years.

== Career ==
=== Surgical career ===
Said to be a brilliant scholar, Lawrence was the translator of several anatomical works written in Latin, and was fully conversant with the latest research on the continent. He had good looks and a charming manner, and was a fine lecturer. His quality as a surgeon was never questioned. Lawrence helped the radical campaigner Thomas Wakley found the Lancet journal, and was prominent at mass meetings for medical reform in 1826. Elected to the Council of the RCS in 1828, he became its president in 1846, and again in 1855. He delivered their Hunterian Oration in 1834.

During Lawrence's surgical career, he held the posts of Professor of Anatomy and Surgery, Royal College of Surgeons (1815–1822); Surgeon to the hospitals of Bridewell and Bethlem, and to the London Infirmary for Diseases of the Eye; Demonstrator of Anatomy, then Assistant Surgeon, later Surgeon, St Bartholomew's Hospital (1824–1865). Later in his career, he was appointed Surgeon Extraordinary, later Serjeant Surgeon, to the Queen. His specialty was ophthalmology, although he practiced in and lectured and wrote on all branches of surgery. Pugin and Queen Victoria were among his patients with eye problems.

Shelley and his second wife Mary Shelley consulted him on a variety of ailments from 1814. Mary's novel Frankenstein might have been inspired by the vitalist controversy between Lawrence and Abernethy, and "Lawrence could have guided the couple's reading in the physical sciences". Both Samuel Coleridge and John Keats were also influenced by the vitalist controversy.

Despite reaching the height of his profession with the quality of his surgical work and his textbooks, Lawrence is mostly remembered today for a period in his early career which brought him fame and notoriety, and led him to the brink of ruin.

=== Controversy and Chancery ===
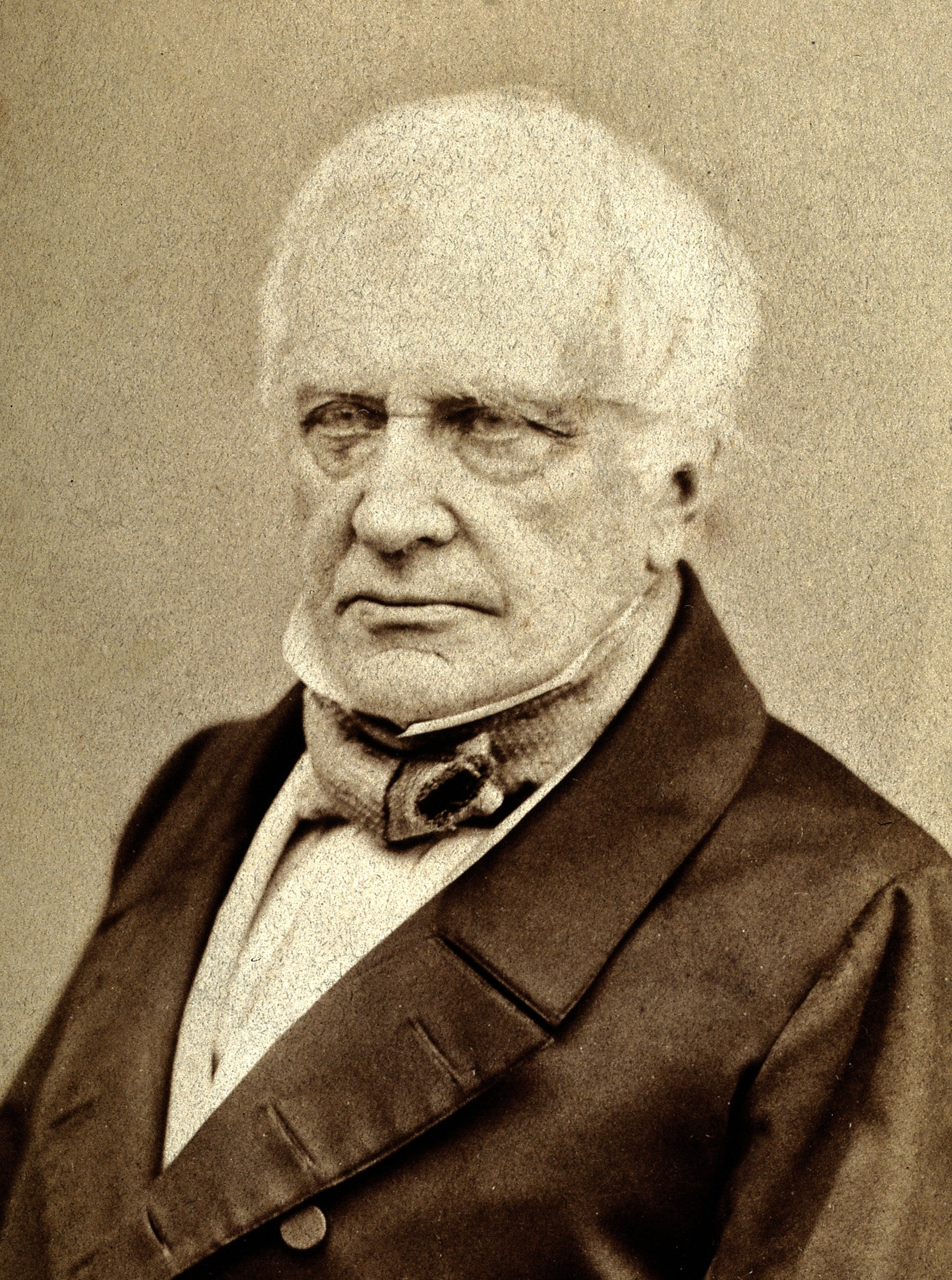
Photograph of William Lawrence later in life

At the age of 30, in 1813, Lawrence was elected a Fellow of the Royal Society. In 1815, he was appointed Professor of Anatomy and Surgery by the College of Surgeons. His lectures started in 1816, and the set was published the same year. The book was immediately attacked by Abernethy and others for materialism, and for undermining the moral welfare of the people. One of the issues between Lawrence and his critics concerned the origin of thoughts and consciousness. For Lawrence, mental processes were a function of the brain. John Abernethy and others thought differently: they explained thoughts as the product of vital acts of an immaterial kind. Abernethy also published his lectures, which contained his support for John Hunter's vitalism, and his objections to Lawrence's materialism.

In subsequent years Lawrence vigorously contradicted his critics until, in 1819, he published a second book, known by its short title of The Natural history of man. The book caused a storm of disapproval from conservative and clerical quarters for its supposed atheism, and within the medical profession because he advocated a materialist rather than vitalist approach to human life. He was linked by his critics with such other 'revolutionaries' as Thomas Paine and Lord Byron. It was "the first great scientific issue that widely seized the public imagination in Britain, a premonition of the debate over Darwin's theory of evolution by natural selection, exactly forty years later".

Hostility from the established Church of England was guaranteed. "A vicious review in the Tory Quarterly Review execrated his materialist explanation of man and mind"; the Lord Chancellor, Lord Eldon, in the Court of Chancery (1822), ruled his lectures blasphemous on the grounds that the book contradicted Holy Scripture (the Bible). This destroyed the book's copyright. Lawrence was also repudiated by his own teacher, John Abernethy, with whom he had already had a controversy about John Hunter's teachings. There were supporters, such as Richard Carlile and Thomas Forster, and "The Monthly Magazine", in which Lawrence was compared to Galileo. However, faced with persecution, perhaps prosecution, and certainly ruin through the loss of surgical patients, Lawrence withdrew the book and resigned from his teaching position. The time had not yet arrived when a science which dealt with man as a species could be conducted without interference from the religious authorities.

It is interesting that the Court of Chancery was acting, here, in its most ancient role, that of a court of conscience. This entailed the moral law applied to prevent peril to the soul of the wrongdoer through mortal sin. The remedy was given to the plaintiff (the Crown, in this case) to look after the wrongdoer's soul; the benefit to the plaintiff was only incidental. This is also the explanation for specific performance, which compels the sinner to put matters right. The whole conception is medieval in origin.

It is difficult to find a present-day parallel. The withholding of copyright, though only an indirect financial penalty, was both an official act and a hostile signal. We do not seem to have a word for this kind of indirect pressure, though suppression of dissent comes closer than censorship. Perhaps the modern 'naming and shaming' comes closest. The importance of respectability, reputation, and public standing was critical in this case, as so often in traditional societies.

=== Transition to respectability ===
After repudiating his book, Lawrence returned to respectability, but not without regrets. He wrote in 1830 to William Hone, who was acquitted of libel in 1817, explaining his expediency and commending Hone's "much greater courage in these matters".

His last major contribution to the debate was an article on "Life" in the 1819 Rees's Cyclopaedia although this volume had in fact appeared in 1812.

He continued to espouse radical ideas, and, led by the famous radical campaigner Thomas Wakley, Lawrence was part of the small group which launched The Lancet, and wrote material for it. Lawrence wrote pungent editorials, and chaired the public meetings in 1826 at the Freemasons' Tavern. He was also co-owner of the Aldersgate Private Medical Academy, with Frederick Tyrrell.

==== The 1826 meetings ====
Meetings for members of the college were attended by about 1200 people. The meetings were called to protest against the way surgeons abused their privileges to set student fees and control appointments.

In his opening speech, Lawrence criticised the by-laws of the College of Surgeons for preventing all but a few teachers in London, Dublin, Edinburgh, Glasgow, and Aberdeen from issuing certificates of attendance at preparatory lectures. He pointed out that Aberdeen and Glasgow had no cadavers for dissection, without which anatomy could not be properly taught.

A proposed change in the regulations of the College of Surgeons would soon cut the ground from under the private summer schools, since diplomas taken in the summer were not to be recognised.

"It would appear from the new regulations that sound knowledge was the sort acquired in the winter, when the hospital lecturers delivered their courses, while unsound knowledge was imparted in the summer when only the private schools could provide the instruction". Lawrence in his opening speech, Freemason's Tavern, 1826.

Lawrence concluded by protesting against the exclusion of the great provincial teachers from giving recognised certificates.

==== Gradual change ====
However, gradually Lawrence conformed more to the style of the College of Surgeons, and was elected to their Council in 1828. This somewhat wounded Wakley, who complained to Lawrence, and made some remarks in the Lancet. But, true to form, Wakley soon saw Lawrence's rise in the college as providing him with an inside track into the workings of the institution he was hoping to reform. For some years, Lawrence hunted with the Lancet and ran with the college. From the inside, Lawrence was able to help forward several of the much-needed reforms espoused by Wakley. The College of Surgeons was at last reformed, to some extent at least, by a new charter in 1843.

This episode marks Lawrence's return to respectability; in fact, Lawrence succeeded Abernethy as the 'dictator' of Bart's.

His need for respectability and worldly success might have been influenced by his marriage in 1828, at the age of 45, to the 25-year-old socially ambitious Louisa Senior.

At any rate, from then on Lawrence's career went ever forward. He never looked back: he became President of the Royal College of Surgeons, and Serjeant-Surgeon to Queen Victoria. Before he died, she made him a baronet. He had for many years declined such honours, and family tradition was that he finally accepted to help his son's courtship of an aristocratic young woman (which did not succeed). "Never again [did] he venture to express his views on the processes of evolution, on the past or the future of man." He did, however, warn the young T.H. Huxley – in vain, it must be said—not to broach the dangerous topic of the evolution of man.

In 1844 Carl Gustav Carus, the physiologist and painter, made "a visit to Mr. Lawrence, author of a work on the "Physiology of Man" which had interested me much some years ago, but which had rendered the author obnoxious to the clergy... He appears to have allowed himself to be frightened by this, and is now merely a practicing surgeon who keeps his Sunday in the old English fashion, and has let physiology and psychology alone for the present." I found him a rather dry but honest man". Looking back in 1860 on his controversies with Abernethy, Lawrence wrote of "events which, though important at the time of occurrence, have long ceased to occupy my thoughts".

In 1828, he was elected a foreign member of the Royal Swedish Academy of Sciences and in 1855 a Foreign Honorary Member of the American Academy of Arts and Sciences.

=== Darwin ===
The careful anonymity in which the Vestiges of the Natural History of Creation was published in 1844, and the very great caution shown by Darwin in publishing his own evolutionary ideas, can be seen in the context of the need to avoid a direct conflict with the religious establishment. In 1838 Darwin referred in his "C" transmutation notebook to a copy of Lawrence's "Lectures on physiology, zoology, and the natural history of man", and historians have speculated that he brooded about the implied consequences of publishing his own ideas.

In Lawrence's day, the impact of laws on sedition and blasphemy were even more threatening than they were in Darwin's time. Darwin referred to Lawrence (1819) six times in his Descent of Man (1871).

Lawrence's Natural History of Man contained some remarkable anticipations of later thought, but was ruthlessly suppressed. To this day, many historical accounts of evolutionary ideas do not mention Lawrence's contribution. He is omitted, for example, from many of the Darwin biographies, from some evolution textbooks, essay collections, and even from accounts of pre-Darwinian science and religion.

Although the only idea of interest which Darwin found in Lawrence was that of sexual selection in man, the influence on Alfred Russel Wallace, was more positive. Wallace "found in Lawrence a possible mechanism of organic change, that of spontaneous variation leading to the formation of new species".

== Context ==
Lawrence was one of three British medical men who wrote on evolution-related topics from 1813 to 1819. They would all have been familiar with Erasmus Darwin and Lamarck at least; and probably also Malthus. Two (Prichard and Lawrence) dedicated their works to Blumenbach, the founder of physical anthropology. "The men who took up the challenge of Lamarck were three English physicians, Wells, Lawrence and Prichard... All three men denied soft heredity (Lamarckism)" This account is not too accurate in biographical terms, as Lawrence was actually a surgeon, Wells was born in Carolina to a Scottish family, and Prichard was a Scot. However, it is correct in principle on the main issue. Each grasped aspects of Darwin's theory, yet none saw the whole picture, and none developed the ideas any further. The later publication of Robert Chambers' Vestiges and Matthew's Naval Timber was more explicit; the existence of the whole group suggests there was something real (though intangible) about the intellectual atmosphere in Britain, which is captured by the phrase 'evolution was in the air'.

The years 1815–1835 saw much political and social turmoil in Britain, not least in the medical profession. There were radical medical students and campaigners in both Edinburgh and London, the two main training centres for the profession at the time. Many of these were materialists who held views favouring evolution, but of a Lamarckian or Geoffroyan kind. It is the allegiance to hard inheritance or to natural selection which distinguishes Lawrence, Prichard, and Wells, because those ideas have survived, and are part of the present-day account of evolution.

=== Lawrence on heredity ===
The existence of races is a token of change in the human species, and suggests there is some significance in geographical separation. Lawrence noted that racial characteristics were inherited, not caused by the direct effect of, for instance, climate. As an example, he considered the way skin colour was inherited by children of African origin when born in temperate climates: how their colour developed without exposure to the sun, and how this continued through generations. This was evidence against the direct effect of climate.

Lawrence's ideas on heredity were many years ahead of their time, as this extract shows: "The offspring inherit only [their parents'] connate peculiarities and not any of the acquired qualities". This is as clear a rejection of soft inheritance as one can find. However, Lawrence qualified it by including the origin of birth defects owing to influences on the mother (an old folk superstition). So Mayr places Wilhelm His, Sr. in 1874 as the first unqualified rejection of soft inheritance. However, the number of places in the text where Lawrence explicitly rejects the direct action of the environment on heredity justifies his recognition as an early opponent of Geoffroyism.

=== Darlington's interpretation ===
Here, as seen by Cyril Darlington, are some of the ideas presented by Lawrence in his book, much abbreviated and rephrased in more modern terms:

- Mental as well as physical differences in man are inherited.
- Races of man have arisen by mutations such as may be seen in litters of kittens.
- Sexual selection has improved the beauty of advanced races and governing classes.
- The separation of races preserves their characters.
- 'Selections and exclusions' are the means of change and adaptation.
- Men can be improved by selection in breeding just as domesticated cattle can be. Conversely, they can be ruined by inbreeding, a consequence which can be observed in many royal families.
- Zoological study, the treatment of man as an animal, is the only proper foundation for teaching and research in medicine, morals, or even in politics.

Darlington's account goes further than other commentators. He seems to credit Lawrence with a modern appreciation of selection (which he definitely did not have); subsequently, Darlington's account was criticised as an overstatement. Darlington does not claim Lawrence actually enunciated a theory of evolution, though passages in Lawrence's book do suggest that races were historically developed. On heredity and adaptation, and the rejection of Lamarckism (soft inheritance), Lawrence is quite advanced.

== Content of the second book ==
=== The introductory sections ===
Lecture I: Introductory to the lectures of 1817.
Reply to the charges of Mr. Abernethy: Modern history and progress of comparative anatomy.

This follows the first publication of Lawrence's ideas in 1816, and Abernethy's criticism of them in his lectures for 1817.

"Gentlemen! I cannot presume to address you again... without first publicly clearing myself from a charge publicly made... of propagating opinions detrimental to society... for the purpose of loosening those restraints, on which the welfare of mankind depends."
*[footnote] Physiological lectures, exhibiting a general view of Mr Hunter's Physiology &c &c. by John Abernethy FRS. [references] "too numerous to be particularized." This book of lectures at the same College of Surgeons contained the charge of which Lawrence complained.
In this very long footnote Lawrence says that the elementary anatomy in Abernethy's text is used "like water in a medical prescription... an innocent vehicle for the more active ingredients."

The early part of the 1819 book is marked by Lawrence's reaction to Abernethy's attack on the 'materialism' of the first book. After a long preamble, in which Lawrence extols the virtues of freedom of speech, he eventually gets to the point:

"It is alleged that there is a party of modern sceptics, co-operating in the diffusion of these noxious opinions with a no less terrible band of French physiologists, for the purpose of demoralising mankind! Such is the general tenor of the accusation..." p3
"Where, Gentlemen! shall we find proofs of this heavy charge? p4
I see the animal functions inseparable from the animal organs... examine the mind... Do we not see it actually built up before our eyes by the actions of the five external senses, and of the gradually developed internal faculties? p5 (see also p74-81 on the functions of the brain)
I say, physiologically speaking... because the theological doctrine of the soul, and its separate existence, has nothing to do with this physiological question, but rests on a species of proof altogether different." p6

Lawrence is here arguing that medical questions should be answered by medical evidence, in other words, he is arguing for rational thought and empiricism instead of revelation or received religion. In particular, he insisted that mental activity was produced as a function of the brain, and has nothing to do with metaphysical concepts such as the 'soul'. Also, there is an implication, never quite stated, that Abernethy's motive might be venal; that jealousy (for example) might be revealed by "a consideration of the real motives" (phrase from his long initial footnote). It is absolutely clear that the conflict predates the publication of Lawrence's book.

=== Evidence from geology and palaeontology ===
The discussion drawn from stratigraphy is interesting:

"The inferior layers, or the first in order of time, contain the remains most widely different from the animals of the living creation; and as we advance to the surface there is a gradual approximation to our present species." p39

Refers to Cuvier, Brongniart and Lamarck in France, and Parkinson in Britain in connection with fossils:

"... the extinct races of animals... those authentic memorials of beings... whose living existence... has been supposed, with considerable probability, to be of older date than the formation of the human race." p39

=== Summary of ideas on human races ===
Chapter VII raises the issue of whether different races have similar diseases (p162 et seq) and ends with a list of reasons for placing man in one distinct species. The reasons are mostly anatomical with some behavioural, such as speech. They remain valid today.

Next there is a lengthy discussion of variation in man, and of the differences between races. Then he considers causation. Lectures of 1818, Chapter IX: On the causes of the varieties of the human species:

"Having examined the principal points in which the several tribes of the human species differ from each other... I proceed to inquire whether the diversities enumerated ... are to be considered as characteristic distinctions coeval with the origin of the species, or as a result of subsequent variation; and in the event of the latter... whether they are the effect of external... causes, or of native or congenital variety." p343
"Great influence has at all times been ascribed to climate... [but] we have abundance of proof that [differences of climate] are entirely inadequate to account for the differences between the different races of men. p343–4

He shows clearly in several places that differences between races (and between varieties of domesticated animals) are inherited, and not caused by the direct action of the environment; then follows this admission:

"We do not understand the exact nature of the process by which it [meaning the correspondence between climate and racial characteristics] is effected." p345

So, after insisting on empirical (non-religious) evidence, he has clearly rejected Lamarckism but has not thought of natural selection.

=== Ideas on mechanism ===
Although in places Lawrence disclaims all knowledge of how the differences between races arose, elsewhere there are passages which hint at a mechanism. In Chapter IX, for example, we find:

"These signal diversities which constitute differences of race in animals... can only be explained by two principles... namely, the occasional production of an offspring with different characters from those of the parents, as a native or congenital variety; [ie heritable] and the propagation of such varieties by generation." p348 [continues with examples of heritable variety in offspring in one litter of kittens, or sheep. This is Mendelian inheritance and segregation]

Passages like this are interpreted by Darlington in his first two points above; there is more on variety and its origin in Chapter IV, p67-8. It is clear that Lawrence's understanding of heredity was well ahead of his time, (ahead of Darwin, in fact) and that he only lacks the idea of selection to have a fully-fledged theory of evolution.

=== Introduction of the word biology ===
At least five people have been claimed as the first to use the word biology:

- Michael Christoph Hanov (Philosophiae naturalis sive physicae dogmaticae: Geologia, biologia, phytologia generalis et dendrologia, 1767)
- Karl Friedrich Burdach (in 1800)
- Gottfried Reinhold Treviranus (Biologie oder Philosophie der lebenden Natur, 1802). Treviranus used it to apply to the study of human life and character.
- Jean-Baptiste Lamarck (Hydrogéologie, 1802, p. 8)
- Lawrence, in 1819. According to the OED, Lawrence was the first person to use the word in English.

=== Contradiction of the Bible ===
Direct contradiction of the Bible was something Lawrence might have avoided, but his honesty and forthright approach led him onto this dangerous ground:

"The representations of all the animals being brought before Adam in the first instance and subsequently of their being collected in the ark... are zoologically impossible." p169

"The entire or even partial inspiration of the... Old Testament has been, and is, doubted by many persons, including learned divines and distinguished oriental and biblical scholars. The account of the creation and of subsequent events, has the allegorical character common to eastern compositions..." p168-9 incl. footnotes.

"The astronomer does not portray the heavenly motions, or lay down the laws which govern them, according to the Jewish scriptures [Old Testament] nor does the geologist think it necessary to modify the results of experience according to the contents of the Mosaic writings. I conclude then, that the subject is open for discussion." p172

Passages such as these, fully in the tradition of British empiricism and the Age of Enlightenment, were no doubt pointed out to the Lord Chancellor. In his opinion, the subject was not open for discussion.

== Ealing Park ==
In June 1838, Lawrence purchased the Ealing Park mansion along with the surrounding 100 acres known as "Little Ealing" (then in Middlesex) at a purchase price of £9,000 (equivalent to £863,000 in 2025). Ealing Park is described by Pevsner as "Low and long; nine bays with pediment over the centre and an Ionic one-storeyed colonnade all along." The property was grandly furnished, as may be seen from the catalogue of the sale of the contents after her death. The estate boasted livestock, including poultry of all sorts, cows, sheep and pigs. There were thousands of bedding plants, "tove plants, more than 600 plants in early forcing houses, nearly a hundred camellias, and more.

However, they mainly lived on Whitehall Place in City of Westminster. His son later sold Ealing Park.

== Personal life and family ==
On 4 August 1823, Lawrence married Louisa Senior (1803–1855), the daughter of a Mayfair haberdasher, who built up social fame through horticulture. They had two sons and three daughters. Their elder son died in childhood but their second son, Sir Trevor Lawrence, 2nd Baronet, was himself a prominent horticulturist and was for many years President of the Royal Horticultural Society. One daughter died at age 18 months and the other two died unmarried.

1. William James (10 October 1829 – buried 5 November 1839)
2. John James Trevor (30 December 1831 – 22 December 1913)
3. Mary Louisa (28 August 1833 – buried 7 March 1835)
4. Louisa Elizabeth (22 February 1836 – 4 January 1920)
5. Mary Wilhelmina (1 November 1839 – 24 November 1920)

Louisa Lawrence died 14 August 1855. Lawrence suffered an attack of apoplexy whilst descending the stairs at the College of Surgeons and died on 5 July 1867 at his house, 18 Whitehall Place, London.

== Bibliography ==
- Lawrence, William FRS 1816. An introduction to the comparative anatomy and physiology, being the two introductory lectures delivered at the Royal College of Surgeons on the 21st and 25th of March 1816. J. Callow, London. 179pp. [Chapter 2 'On life' was the start of his troubles, and caused the first attacks of the grounds of materialism &c]
- Lawrence, William FRS 1819. Lectures on physiology, zoology and the natural history of man. J. Callow, London. 579pp. Reprinted 1822.
  There were a number of unauthorized reprints of this work, pirated (in the sense that the author went unrecompensed) but seemingly unexpurgated. These editions also lacked the protection of copyright, and date from 1819 to 1848. Some of them were by quite respectable publishers. Desmond's view is that the Chancery decision was "a ringing endorsement to atheist ears. Six pauper presses pirated the offending book, keeping it in print for decades. As a result, although officially withdrawn, Lawrence's magnum opus could be found on every dissident's bookshelf." Desmond & Moore 1991. Darwin p253.
  The text of all editions is probably identical, though no-one has published a full bibliographical study.

1822 W. Benbow. 500pp. Darwin's copy was of this edition.
1822 Kaygill & Price (no plates). 2 vols, 288+212pp.
1823 J&C Smith (new plates). 532pp.
1838 J. Taylor. ('twelve new engravings'; seventh edition – stereotyped). 396pp.
1844 J. Taylor (old plates; 'ninth edition – stereotyped). 396pp.
1848 H.G. Bohn (ninth edition, as above).
The British Library also holds a number of pamphlets, mostly attacking Lawrence's ideas.

- Lawrence, William FRS 1807. Treatise on hernia. Callow, London. Later editions from 1816 entitled Treatise on ruptures: an anatomical description of each species with an account of its symptoms, progress, and treatment. 5th and last ed 1858. "The standard text for many years" Morton, A medical bibliography #3587.
- [Lawrence, William] 1819. 'Life', an anonymous article in Abraham Rees' Cyclopaedia, vol 22. Longman, London.
- Lawrence, W. 1833. A treatise on the diseases of the eye. Churchill, London. This work is based on lectures delivered at the London Ophthalmic Infirmary; later edition 1845. "He did much to advance the surgery of the eye. This comprehensive work marks an epoch in ophthalmic surgery." Morton, A medical bibliography #5849.
- Lawrence, William 1834. The Hunterian Oration, delivered at the Royal College of Surgeons on the 14th of February 1834. Churchill, London.
- Lawrence, William 1863. Lectures on surgery. London.

Baronetage of the United Kingdom
New creation	Baronet (of Ealing Park); 1867	Succeeded by James John Trevor Lawrence
