= Eyre Crabbe =

Brigadier-General Eyre Crabbe CB
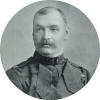
- Crabbe in c. 1900
- Born: 15 March 1852
- Died: 8 March 1905 (aged 52)
- Education: Harrow School
- Military career
- Allegiance: United Kingdom
- Branch: British Army
- Service years: 1871–1905
- Commands: 3rd Battalion, Grenadier Guards
- Conflicts: Anglo-Egyptian War; Bombardment of Alexandria; Mahdist War; Battle of Abu Klea; Second Boer War; Battle of Belmont; Battle of Magersfontein

Brigadier-General Eyre Macdonnell Stewart Crabbe, CB (15 March 1852 – 8 March 1905) was a Grenadier Guards officer who fought in the Sudan campaign to rescue General Gordon and in the Second Boer War.

== Background and early life ==
His father was Colonel Eyre John Crabbe of the 74th Regiment, himself the son of Colonel Joseph Crabbe of the East India Company's army. His mother, Elmina Stewart, came from a Jamaica planter family. After education at Harrow School he joined the Grenadier Guards as a lieutenant on 18 October 1871 and was one of the first ensigns not to have to pay for a commission, following the Cardwell reforms. During service in Ireland as a young lieutenant, he married in 1876 Emily Constance Jameson, a descendant of John Jameson, the founder of the Dublin distilling family.

== Military career ==
Crabbe worked for several years as a musketry instructor, but in 1882 he helped organise the logistical operations for the British attack on Alexandria. He was promoted to captain the following year, on 24 November 1883. In 1884 he volunteered for the Sudan campaign as part of the Guards Camel Corps and took part in the battle of Abu Klea. Promotion to major followed on 15 June 1885.

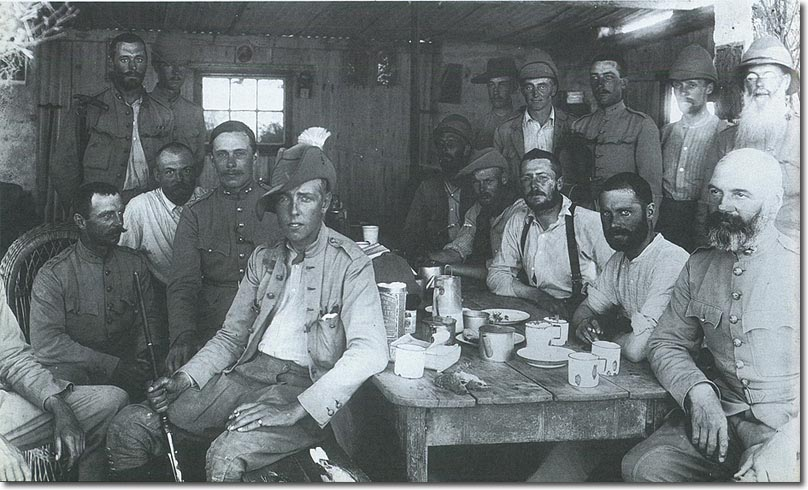
Officers of the 3rd Battalion, Grenadier Guards, in their mess at Modder River, South Africa, 1900. The battalion's CO, Lieutenant Colonel Crabbe, is sat on the far right.

On 6 July 1898 he was promoted to lieutenant colonel and became commanding officer (CO) of the 3rd Battalion, Grenadier Guards, and the following year he led the battalion to South Africa following the outbreak of the Second Boer War in October 1899. He was wounded at the Battle of Belmont in November 1899 and mentioned in despatches, but was back with his battalion in time for the Battle of Magersfontein in December. In March 1900 his battalion took part in the march on Bloemfontein and the pacification of the Orange Free State. He escorted Piet Cronjé into captivity, and commented in a letter home: "It is a curious idea taking one’s wife & family with one to the wars & must be inconvenient for many reasons but it is rather the fashion in these parts. Living in a river bed & being shot at every day seems an odd fancy for a lady." On 23 March he was badly wounded when a small foraging party, mainly of officers, which he was leading, including Colonel Codrington of the Coldstream Guards, was ambushed at Karee Siding; his adjutant was killed. This episode was generally regarded as "plucky" but widely reported round the world as an example of the "over-confidence and recklessness" (in the words of the New York Tribune) of British officers. However Crabbe was back with his battalion by the end of April and as they marched north towards Pretoria on 1 May Crabbe was observed and commented on by Arthur Conan Doyle:

Here is another man worth noting. You could not help noting him if you tried. A burly, broad-shouldered man with full, square, black beard over his chest, his arm in a sling, his bearing a medieval knight-errant. It is Crabbe, of the Grenadier Guards.

Crabbe led his battalion to Pretoria and on to the border with Portuguese East Africa at Koomati Poort but their hopes of returning to England with Field Marshal Lord Roberts in November 1900 were dashed. Instead they were sent from Transvaal to Cape Colony to prevent De Wet entering the Cape. When the character of the war changed in early 1901 to that of blockhouses, concentration camps, and mobile columns against Boer guerillas, Crabbe became commander of a mobile column, not rejoining his battalion till March 1902. His mobile column had dangerous brushes with Fouche in May and with Kritzinger in July 1901, and led the forces which defeated and killed Van der Merwe in September and Hildebrand in November. Following the end of the war in May 1902, he was relieved of his command of the 3rd Grenadier Guards and placed on half-pay on 6 July 1902, with a brevet promotion to colonel from the same date. He returned to England on the SS Carisbrook Castle in late July, landing at Southampton the following month. For his services Crabbe was appointed a Companion of the Order of the Bath (CB) in the April 1901 South Africa Honours list (the award was dated to 29 November 1900), and he received the actual decoration after his return, from King Edward VII at Buckingham Palace on 24 October 1902.

Later the same year, Crabbe was appointed assistant quartermaster general (AGMG) of the 1st Army Corps at Aldershot, with the substantive rank of colonel from 2 November 1902. In May 1903 he became chief staff officer of the 4th Army Corps also at Aldershot.

He died suddenly of a heart attack soon after arriving for work on 8 March 1905, aged only 52.

== Family ==
Crabbe married, in 1876, Emily Constance Jameson (1858–1904). His wife had predeceased him and he left four sons and four daughters:

- Colville Cornwallis Albert Eyre Crabbe (b.1878), served Highland Light Infantry; Princess Patricia's Canadian Light Infantry; Auxiliary Division, Royal Irish Constabulary. Died 1921.
- Daisy Maude Crabbe b.1879, d. 1966, twin, married John Ronald Moreton Macdonald of Largie Castle
- Violet Constance Eyre Crabbe b.1879, d. 1951 twin, married Brigadier Robert Hugh Willan, DSO, MC.
- Selina Gladys Eyre Crabbe b.1880, d. 1955, married Hugh Francis Blair-Imrie
- Vice-Admiral Lewis Gonne Eyre Crabbe CB, CIE, CBE, DSO b.1882, d. 1951), a Royal Navy officer, who commanded a ship at the Battle of Jutland in 1916, was Senior Naval Officer in the Persian Gulf and on the Yangtze, and Flag Officer at Liverpool in 1939.
- Ivan Stewart Eyre Crabbe, b. 1884, d. 1937
- Bertha Iris Eyre Crabbe, b. 1887, married Sir William Lawrence, 3rd Baronet, d. 1955.
- Campbell Tempest Eyre Crabbe (1897–1915), a subaltern in the Grenadier Guards, was killed at the Battle of Loos in 1915.
