= Lawrence baronets =

Set index for Lawrence baronets

There have been seven baronetcies created for persons with the surname Lawrence, one in the Baronetage of England, one in the Baronetage of Great Britain and five in the Baronetage of the United Kingdom.

- Lawrence baronets of Iver (1628)
- Lawrence, later Woollaston baronets, of Loseby (1748): see Woollaston baronets
- Lawrence baronets of Lucknow (1858)
- Lawrence baronets of the Army (1858): see Baron Lawrence
- Lawrence baronets of Ealing Park (1867)
- Lawrence baronets of Westbourne Terrace (1869): see Sir James Lawrence, 1st Baronet (1820–1897)
- Lawrence baronets of Sloane Gardens (1906)
