= Guijarro =

Guijarro is a surname of Spanish origin, meaning 'pebble'. People with that name include:

- Alberto Redondo Guijarro (born 1997), Spanish footballer
- Alejandro Guijarro (born 1979), Spanish artist
- Antonio Aparisi Guijarro (1815–1872), Spanish politician and journalist
- David Antón Guijarro (born 1995), Spanish chess grandmaster
- Gonzalo Guijarro (born 1996), Spanish footballer
- Josep Guijarro (born 1967), Spanish writer, ufologist and journalist
- Manuel Guijarro Doménech (born 1963), Spanish racing cyclist
- Patricia Guijarro (born 1998), Spanish footballer
- Sergio Sestelo Guijarro (born 1978), Spanish footballer
- Sheila Guijarro (born 1996), Spanish footballer
- Txema Guijarro García (born 1975), Spanish economist and politician

== See also ==
- Casas de Guijarro, a municipality in Cuenca, Castile-La Mancha, Spain
- Fort Guijarros, a California Historical Landmark
