= Bryan Formhals =

American photographer and editor

Bryan Formhals (born October 18, 1976) is an American photographer and editor, based in New York City. He co-edited the book Photographers' Sketchbooks (2014).

== Life and work ==
Formhals was born in St. Cloud, Minnesota. He earned a degree in communication and journalism at nearby Saint John's University, Collegeville in 1999. He moved to Minneapolis and got a job working for a web company, transferring west to Santa Monica, Los Angeles County, California in 2004. In LA he took a class at The Second City doing improvisational comedy and wrote a screenplay. In 2005, unhappy with his screenplay and experiencing writer's block, he began taking photographs while walking around Hollywood and Downtown Los Angeles. This resulted in the series Genesee Ave. In 2009 he moved east to New York City, first to Greenpoint, Brooklyn and then in 2012 to Astoria, Queens.

In 2010 Wired highlighted Formhals as one of its "Favorite Photobloggers" for his blog La Pura Vida. He founded and was managing editor of LPV Magazine, curating documentary and fine-art photography in print for 7 issues between 2011 and 2013 and on the web. Time included Formhals' LPV Magazine Twitter feed in its "140 Best Twitter Feeds of 2013". In 2015/2016 he was host and co-creator, with Tom Starkweather and Eddy Vallante, of The LPV Show, a conversational podcast about photography books. LPV Show guests included Khalik Allah, Mathieu Asselin, Richard Bram, Noah Kalina, Susan Meiselas, Greg Miller, Elle Pérez, Gus Powell, Ken Schles and Rachel Sussman. In 2014, Formhals and Stephen McLaren co-edited Photographers' Sketchbooks, described in The Independent as a "meticulously researched book [that] offers a fascinating insight into the work and methods of more than 50 photographers."

Formhals is currently focused on "walking, pedestrian infrastructure, and urban greenery" in New York City through photography, a weekly newsletter, and a conversational podcast made with Starkweather called Way of the Walk.

He has earned a living as content strategist and managing the social media team at B&H Photo, and as senior content marketing manager at Shutterstock and Adorama.

== Publications edited by Formhals ==
- Photographers' Sketchbooks. New York: Thames & Hudson, 2014. Co-edited and with essays by Formhals and Stephen McLaren. ISBN 978-0500544341.

== Exhibitions ==
- Common Ground: New American Street Photography, New Orleans Photo Alliance Gallery, New Orleans, February–March 2013; drkrm, Los Angeles, July 2013. Curated by Stephen McLaren. With work by Blake Andrews, Richard Bram, Formhals, Chuck Patch and Jack Simon.
