= Sophie Gerrard =

British photographer (born 1978)

- Born: 1978 (age 47–48); Edinburgh
- Education: BSc (Hons) Environmental Sciences, Manchester University MA in Photojournalism & Documentary Photography, London College of Communication
- Occupation: Documentary Photographer

Sophie Gerrard (born 1978) is a Scottish documentary photographer whose work focuses on environmental and social themes. She is a lecturer at Edinburgh Napier University, a member of the board of trustees for Impressions Gallery in Bradford, and a co-founder member of Document Scotland. She has won the Jerwood Photography Award, the Fuji Film Bursary and the Magenta Foundation Award.

== Early life and education ==
Gerrard was born in 1978 in Edinburgh. She graduated from Manchester University in 1999 as an environmental scientist. Her interest in environmental and social issues led her to obtain a photography degree from Edinburgh College of Art and a M.A in Photojournalism and Documentary Photography from the London College of Communication in 2006.

== Career ==
In 2012, she co-founded Document Scotland with Colin McPherson, Jeremy Sutton-Hibbert and Stephen McLaren. Her work has been featured regularly in The Guardian Weekend Magazine, the Financial Times Magazine, the Telegraph Saturday Magazine, the Independent on Sunday, and by Save The Children and Greenpeace International. "Drawn To The Land" which she started in 2012, is an ongoing project examining the importance of representation. The project documents the lives of female hill farmers who work in a predominantly male sector.

== Publications ==
=== Zines by Gerrard ===
- Tunnock's. Southport: Café Royal, 2015. Edition of 150 copies.
- Document Scotland. Southport: Café Royal, 2015. A zine each by Gerrard (Tunnock's), Jeremy Sutton-Hibbert (North Sea Fishing), Stephen McLaren (Dookits) and Colin McPherson (Sancta Maria Abbey, Nunraw), in a case. Edition of 50 copies.

=== Publications with contributions by Gerrard ===
- Common Ground. Document Scotland, 2014. Includes two photo essays from each Document Scotland member, including Gerrard, plus work by members of Welsh photography collective A Fine Beginning. With essays by Malcolm Dickson and Anne McNeill. Published to accompany an exhibition at Street Level Photoworks, Glasgow.

== Awards ==
- 2007: One of 6 joint winners, Jerwood Photography Award.
- 2007: One of 25 joint UK Winners, Magenta Foundation Flash Forward Award.
- 2012: Finalist, Photography Open Salon, Arles - To See or not to See.
- 2014: One of 10 selected for FotoDocument One Planet Living Commission, Brighton, UK.

== Group exhibitions ==
- Seeing Ourselves, Fotospace Gallery, Glenrothes, Fife, Scotland, June–July 2013.
- Document Scotland: The Ties that Bind, Scottish National Portrait Gallery, Edinburgh, Scotland, September 2015 – April 2016. Included Drawn to the Land by Gerrard.
- Document Scotland, Beyond the Border: New Contemporary Photography from Scotland, Impressions Gallery, Bradford, UK, July–September 2014; Granary Gallery, Berwick Visual Arts, Berwick-upon-Tweed, UK, February–May 2017. Curated by Anne McNeill.
