= Document Scotland =

Scottish photography collective

Document Scotland is a photography collective founded in 2012 by Sophie Gerrard, Jeremy Sutton-Hibbert, Stephen McLaren and Colin McPherson. It makes documentary photography about Scotland, which it has exhibited at numerous venues in Scotland and beyond, including the Scottish National Portrait Gallery, Impressions Gallery, the Martin Parr Foundation and the Staatliche Museen zu Berlin. Document Scotland has also produced a number of publications and also stages live events and community-focused projects.

== Members ==
- Sophie Gerrard (established the collective in 2012)
- Colin McPherson (established the collective in 2012)
- Margaret Mitchell (joined 2023)
- Craig Easton (joined 2023)
- Jeremy Sutton-Hibbert (established the collective in 2012, left 2023)
- Stephen McLaren (established the collective in 2012, left 2019)
- Sarah Amy Fishlock (joined 2016, left 2017)

== Publications ==
- DOC001. 2013. Newspaper format. With the photo-essays "Dunes" by Sophie Gerrard, "Snaw" by Stephen McLaren, "Catching The Tide" by Colin McPherson, and "Life in The 3rd" by Jeremy Sutton-Hibbert; and an essay by Allan Brown.
- DOC002: Seeing Ourselves. 2013. Newspaper format. Work by 10 photographers, as well as an editorial essay. Published to coincide with an exhibition at Fotospace gallery in Fife.
- DOC003. 2013. Digital magazine for iPad. With four photo-essays, single images and a written essay.
- DOC004: Document Scotland in Beijing.
- DOC005: Common Ground. 2014. Book. With two photo-essays each from Sophie Gerrard, Jeremy Sutton-Hibbert, Stephen McLaren and Colin McPherson; work by photography collective A Fine Beginning; and essays by Malcolm Dickson and Anne McNeill.
- DOC006: The Ties That Bind. 2015. Digital magazine. Published to coincide with an exhibition at the Scottish National Portrait Gallery, Edinburgh.
- Document Scotland. Southport: Café Royal, 2015. A zine each by Gerrard (Tunnock's), Sutton-Hibbert (North Sea Fishing), McLaren (Dookits) and McPherson (Sancta Maria Abbey, Nunraw), in a case. Edition of 50 copies.

== Exhibitions ==
- Seeing Ourselves, Fotospace Gallery, Glenrothes, Fife, Scotland, 3 June – 31 July 2013. Work by the founding members of Document Scotland as well as Martin Hunter, Robert Ormerod, Jenny Wicks, Radek Nowacki, Giulietta Verdon-Roe, and Sarah Amy Fishlock.
- Document Scotland, Beyond the Border: New Contemporary Photography from Scotland, Impressions Gallery, Bradford, UK, 1 July – 27 September 2014; Granary Gallery, Berwick Visual Arts, Berwick-upon-Tweed, UK, 11 February – 14 May 2017. Curated by Anne McNeill.
- Document Scotland: The Ties that Bind, Scottish National Portrait Gallery, Edinburgh, Scotland, 26 September 2015 – 24 April 2016. A Sweet Forgetting by Stephen McLaren, Unsullied and Untarnished by Jeremy Sutton-Hibbert, When Saturday Comes by Colin McPherson, and Drawn to the Land by Sophie Gerrard.
