= Brian Stevens =

Brian Stevens may refer to:

- Brian Stevens (cricketer) (born 1942), former English cricketer
- Brian David Stevens (born 1970), British photographer
- Stack Stevens (Claude Brian Stevens, 1941–2017), English rugby union player
- Birth name of English professional wrestler Peter Thornley (born 1941)

== See also ==
- Brian Stephens (disambiguation)
