= Brian Stephens =

Brian or Bryan Stephens may refer to:

- Bryan Stephens, baseball player
- Brian Stephens, candidate in Sedgefield Council election, 2007
- Brian Stephens (cycling), in Giant-Australian Institute of Sport

== See also ==
- Brian Stevens (disambiguation)
