= Island History Trust =

Coordinates: 51°29′21″N 0°0′49″W

The Island History Trust was a local history institution based on the Isle of Dogs in east London, England. The Trust was created by local people, who started to collect photographs in 1981. At that time the docks and nearly all the local factories had closed, and the transformation of the Island by Canary Wharf and other developments had not begun. Some locals felt a loss of identity as their established way of life had ended and they wished to record and preserve their local history.

Initially the focus was on collecting photographs. Many were copied and returned to their owners, and notes about them were made and indexed. Later interviews were recorded interviews with elderly Islanders, and a number of people wrote memoirs to add to the collection.

The Trust's Collections are as of 2014 managed and maintained by the London Borough of Tower Hamlets Local History Library and Archives in Bancroft Road, Mile End, East London, where they can be viewed during public opening hours.

== Island History News ==
Island History News was published for 31 years up till 2014.

== See also ==
- Museum in Docklands
