= Stephen McLaren =

Scottish photographer, writer, and curator

Stephen McLaren is a Scottish photographer, writer, and curator, based in Los Angeles. He has edited various photography books published by Thames & Hudson—including Street Photography Now (2010)—and produced his own, The Crash (2018). He is a co-founder member of Document Scotland. McLaren's work has been shown at FACT in Liverpool as part of the Look – Liverpool International Photography Festival and in Document Scotland group exhibitions at Impressions Gallery, Bradford and at the Scottish National Portrait Gallery, Edinburgh. His work is held in the collection of the University of St Andrews.

== Career ==
McLaren made television documentaries in Scotland and then in London, before moving to the USA and working as a photographer. In 2013 he was living in San Francisco and is now based in Los Angeles. Matt McCann wrote in The New York Times that McLaren's street photography "feels like a field guide to how normal things can be really odd, contradictory — and visually rich."

He is a co-founder member of the Document Scotland collective, founded in 2012 to make documentary photography about Scotland.

Street Photography Now (2010), co-edited with Sophie Howarth, is a survey book of contemporary street photography, in which McLaren's photography is also included. Photographers' Sketchbooks (2014), co-edited and co-written with Bryan Formhals, gives insight into the work and methods of 50 photographers with a chapter by each of them. Magnum Streetwise (2019), edited by McLaren, contains images he drew from the Magnum Photos archive.

McLaren's book of his own street photography, The Crash (2018), documents the City of London after the 2008 financial crisis, made over five years. The work was shown at the Foundation for Art and Creative Technology (FACT) as part of the Look – Liverpool International Photography Festival in 2011.

Made in the run up to the 2014 Scottish independence referendum, McLaren's series American Always, Scottish Forever depicts Americans with Scottish ancestry attending the Highland games season in California—the athletes, musicians, artists, and visitors who hold a close affinity with Scotland. The work was shown in a Document Scotland group exhibition at Impressions Gallery, Bradford and at Berwick Visual Arts, Berwick-upon-Tweed.

McLaren's A Sweet Forgetting was made after the Scottish National Portrait Gallery asked Document Scotland to produce an exhibition in response to the Scottish independence referendum. McLaren's series is concerned with the involvement of Scots in the sugar economy of Jamaica in the 18th and 19th centuries, built on the slave trade. In Jamaica, he made photographs about the period's genealogical legacy, about the land which had once been owned by rich Scots, and what remained of their houses. He also photographed some of the country estates, mansions and schools built throughout Scotland with wealth amassed by Scottish sugar plantation owners that enslaved Africans generated for nearly 150 years.

== Publications ==
=== Publications of McLaren's photography ===
- The Crash. East London Photo Stories, Book 14. London: Hoxton Mini, 2018. ISBN 978-1-910566-37-4.

=== Zines of McLaren's photography ===
- Dookits. Southport: Café Royal, 2015. Edition of 150 copies.

=== Publications with contributions of McLaren's photography ===
- Street Photography Now. London: Thames & Hudson, 2010. Edited by McLaren and Sophie Howarth. ISBN 978-0-500-54393-1. French-language edition, translated by Berton, Gilles. Paris: Thames & Hudson, 2017. ISBN 9780500293515.
- Common Ground. Document Scotland, 2014. Includes two photo essays from each Document Scotland member, including McLaren, plus work by members of Welsh photography collective A Fine Beginning. With essays by Malcolm Dickson and Anne McNeill. Published to accompany an exhibition at Street Level Photoworks, Glasgow.

=== Publications edited by McLaren ===
- Street Photography Now. London: Thames & Hudson, 2010. Edited by McLaren and Sophie Howarth. ISBN 978-0-500-54393-1. French-language edition, translated by Berton, Gilles. Paris: Thames & Hudson, 2017. ISBN 9780500293515.
- Photographers' Sketchbooks. New York: Thames & Hudson, 2014. Co-edited and co-written by McLaren and Bryan Formhals. ISBN 978-0500544341.
- Family Photography Now. London: Thames & Hudson, 2016. Edited by McLaren and Howarth. ISBN 978-0500544532.
- Magnum Streetwise: the ultimate collection of street photography from Magnum Photos. London; New York: Thames & Hudson, 2019. ISBN 978-0500545072. Photographs by various Magnum Photos photographers.
- Reclaim the Street: Street Photography's Moment. London: Thames & Hudson, 2023. With Matt Stuart. ISBN 9780500545379.

== Exhibitions ==
=== Group exhibitions or exhibitions during festivals with photography by McLaren ===
- London Games, Format International Photography Festival, Derby, UK, 2011
- Moral Hazard, Foundation for Art and Creative Technology (FACT), Liverpool, UK, part of Look – Liverpool International Photography Festival, 2011
- Seeing Ourselves, Fotospace Gallery, Glenrothes, Fife, Scotland, 2013. Work by the founding members of Document Scotland and others.
- Beyond the Border: New Contemporary Photography from Scotland, Impressions Gallery, Bradford, UK; Granary Gallery, Berwick Visual Arts, Berwick-upon-Tweed, UK, 2017. With fellow members of Document Scotland. Included McLaren's American Always, Scottish Forever. Curated by Anne McNeill.
- Common Ground: New Documentary Photography from Scotland & Wales, StreetLevel Photoworks, Glasgow, UK, 2014. With fellow members of Document Scotland. Included McLaren's Scotia Nova.
- Document Scotland: The Ties that Bind, Scottish National Portrait Gallery, Edinburgh, Scotland, 2015/2016. Included A Sweet Forgetting by McLaren.
- A Contested Land, Martin Parr Foundation, Bristol, UK. With fellow members of Document Scotland. Included McLaren's Edinburgh Unchained.

=== Exhibitions curated by McLaren ===
- Common Ground: New American Street Photography, New Orleans Photo Alliance Gallery, New Orleans, 2013; drkrm, Los Angeles, 2013. With work by Blake Andrews, Richard Bram, Formhals, Chuck Patch and Jack Simon.
- Peripheral Vision, The Battery, San Francisco, 2015/2016. Curated by McLaren in collaboration with Thomas Moller and Matt Bernstein.

== Collections ==
McLaren's work is held in the following permanent collections:

- University of St Andrews, St Andrews, Fife, Scotland: 116 works (as of September 2020) including Jamaica: A Sweet Forgetting, American Always Scottish Forever and Scotia Nova

== See also ==
- Sophie Gerrard
