= Café Royal Books =

UK photography publisher

- Founded: 2005; 20 years ago
- Founder: Craig Atkinson
- Country of origin: UK
- Headquarters location: Ainsdale, Southport, Merseyside, England
- Nonfiction topics: Documentary photography
- Official website: www.caferoyalbooks.com

Café Royal Books is an independent publisher of photography photobooks or zines, run by Craig Atkinson and based in Ainsdale, Southport, England. Café Royal Books produces small-run publications predominantly documenting social and cultural change, Including themes of youth, leisure, music, protest, race, religion, industry, identity, architecture and fashion, often in Britain and Ireland, using both new work and photographs from archives. Café Royal Books has been operating since 2005 and has published over 950 books and zines.

Its publications are held in public collections including Tate Britain; National Art Library, Victoria and Albert Museum, London; Museum of Modern Art, New York City; National Gallery of Canada; the British Library and the Baltic Centre for Contemporary Art.

Martin Parr has described Café Royal Books as "a great archive of much forgotten documentary photography" and Daniel Meadows has said "Craig Atkinson [ . . . ] has invented a publishing model for creating a truly exciting new history of documentary photography in Britain."

== Details ==
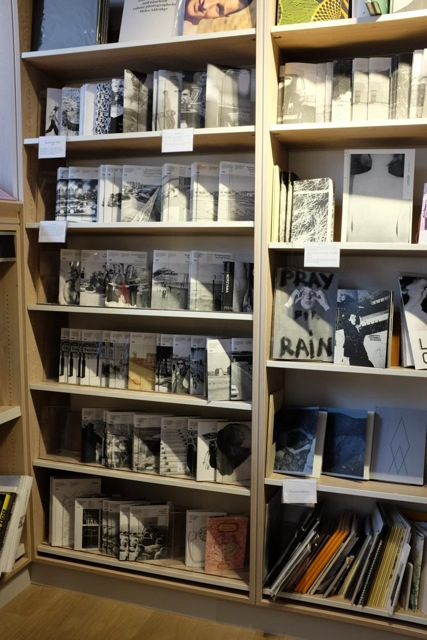
A variety of Café Royal publications for sale in Foyles bookshop, London

Based in Southport, Atkinson is also a senior lecturer and researcher at the University of Central Lancashire. He founded Café Royal Books in 2005. New booklets are published frequently: in 2014, typically one per week and in short runs typically of 250 copies. They are sold both directly and through bookshops in the UK, Europe, USA, Australia, Japan, Canada and Switzerland. The booklets have a consistent print quality, paper and layout; they are laid out to a grid system, usually 36 pages in length, slightly under A5 size, predominantly black & white and affordable. The colophon is on the front cover, making it easy to read on bookshop shelves. (Note: The early issues were different. As examples, Someone Else's Wedding (edited by Atkinson) and Butchers Row (photographed by him), both "© 2011", have the colophon on the back cover (and the number within the edition of 100 penciled in); Butchers Row has no text whatever on its front cover.)

The booklets predominantly document social, historical and cultural change, including themes of youth, leisure, music, protest, race, religion, industry, identity, architecture and fashion, using both previously unpublished work and photographs from archives. Atkinson wrote in 2013 that emphasis "is given to work that encourages new ways of thinking about existing material or language which demonstrates the importance of using, documenting, collecting and observing a particular process or thing." For example, in 2012 Café Royal began publishing a series of books based loosely on documentary photography with links to Britain and Ireland.

Café Royal Books specialises in collaborating with a photographer and their archive or estate. It has published work by over 100 photographers, including John Benton-Harris, John Bulmer, David Carol, John Claridge, Douglas Corrance, John Deakin, Peter Dench, Henrik Drescher, Alejandro Guijarro, Ken Grant, David Hurn, Chris Killip, Stephen McLaren, Daniel Meadows, Tish Murtha, Jim Mortram, Martin Parr, Simon Roberts, Victor Sloan, Brian David Stevens, Homer Sykes, Ed Templeton, Arthur Tress, Patrick Ward, Janine Wiedel, and Document Scotland photographers among others. Café Royal has worked with some photographers to produce numerous different books of their work. Some of the books are of Atkinson's own work.

Café Royal Books occasionally publish larger print runs: as examples, the first printings of Killip's Huddersfield 1974 and of Chris Steele-Perkins' Wolverhampton 1978 were of 500 copies. And some of the publications are later reprinted.

In 2022 the Martin Parr Foundation held a retrospective exhibition, Café Royal Books, Documentary, Zines and Subversion, of 300 Café Royal publications and 167 prints of work appearing within these.

== Collections ==
Various Café Royal publications are held in public collections (museums and galleries) including:

- Baltic Centre for Contemporary Art: 4 publications (as of June 2018)
- British Library.
- Museum of Modern Art, New York, NY.
- Tate Britain.
- National Art Library, Victoria and Albert Museum, London.
- National Gallery of Canada.
- University Library, University of St Andrews, St Andrews, Fife, Scotland.

== Café Royal Projects ==
Café Royal Projects are occasional projects that use gallery type spaces for a purpose other than an exhibition. In 2010 the Café Royal Temporary Library invited artists to submit books and editions. The gallery space was presented as a reading room for the public to use, with 800 titles. In 2012 the International Drawing Project exhibited film, drawing, and publications from eighty artists over three weeks. Ten catalogues were published to document the event and the artists. In 2013 an exhibition and reading room featured essays from academics with backgrounds in photography, artists' books and communication design.

== Exhibitions ==
- Picture Book: Co-curated with Pages, The Tetley, Leeds, UK, January–March 2016. With Café Royal Books publications as well as work from Christian Barnes, David Barton, Nous Vous, and Landfill Editions.
- The Vanished East End: Documentary Photography from the 70s and 80s, Tower Hamlets Local History Library and Archives, September 2021 – February 2022; Brady Arts and Community Centre, April 2022. A collaboration between Café Royal Books, London Metropolitan University's School of Art, Architecture and Design and the East End Archive, an online and digital photographic resource, with work by Diane Bush, Mike Seaborne, Brian Griffin, Tom Hunter, and Syd Shelton.
- Café Royal Books, Documentary, Zines and Subversion, Martin Parr Foundation, Bristol, UK. April–June 2022.
