= Janine Wiedel =

US-born documentary photographer and visual anthropologist in England

Janine Wiedel (born 1947) is a documentary photographer and visual anthropologist. She was born in New York City, has been based in the UK since 1970, and lives in London. Since the late 1960s she has been working on projects which have become books and exhibitions. In the early 1970s she spent five years working on a project about Irish Travellers; in the late 1970s two years documenting the industrial heartland of Britain. Wiedel's work is socially minded, exploring themes such as resistance, protest, multiculturalism and counterculture movements.

Wiedel's books include Irish Tinkers (1976), Looking at Iran (1976), Vulcan's Forge (1979), Dover, a Port in a Storm (1991) and Faces with Voices (1992).

She had solo exhibitions at The Photographers' Gallery in London in 1974 and 1979. Associated Television broadcast a TV documentary about her titled A Camera in the Street. She has won British Life Photography awards in 2015, 2016 and 2017. Her work is held in the collection of the Museum of Modern Art in New York City.

== Life and work ==
=== Early career ===
Having completed two years of an architecture degree at the University of Colorado, where there were few women enrolled on the course, Wiedel switched to studying fine art and photography at the San Francisco Art Institute as well as workshops with Ansel Adams, Nancy Newhall and Beaumont Newhall in the late 1960s. She moved to Britain in 1970 to study photography at the Guildford School of Art from 1970 to 1973. Adams had a great influence on Wiedel's approach to photography, as did Thurston Hopkins who she studied under at the Guildford School of Art.

While in San Francisco, she photographed the Berkeley People's Park protest and riots in 1969. Her photographs contrasted idyllic scenes of community gardening with images of the police and the National Guard occupying Berkeley which emerged from Wiedel's observational style and were put into sharp relief through her editing. Wiedel also photographed the Black Power movement in the late 1960s. The resulting photographs have been published by Café Royal Books (see below).

=== 1970s ===
In 1973 Wiedel spent three weeks living with the Inuit of Pangnirtung on the East coast of Baffin Island in Canada's Northwest Territories. She subsequently published her experience and photographs in the New Humanist magazine in 1974 and the Times Educational Supplement in 1978.

In the early 1970s she spent five years photographing Irish Travellers, resulting in the book Irish Tinkers (1976, updated in 2013 as an ibook titled Irish Tinkers: A portrait of Irish Travellers in the 1970s) and an exhibition at The Photographers' Gallery in London in 1974. She was a photographer for the film Traveller (1997).

In 1976 Wiedel was commissioned by the publishers A & C Black (UK) and Lippincott (USA), with support from the National Iranian Oil Company, to produce a children's educational book, Looking at Iran, ISBN 9780397317974. At a time of political unrest in Iran, Wiedel photographed the lives of the people of Tehran.

Classroom interaction was also one of her ongoing projects in the 1970s and 1980s. Wiedel was commissioned by the Times Educational Supplement, Penguin Education and other educational publishers. She provided the photographs for the book A Guide to Classroom Observation by Rob Walker and Clem Adelman in 1975. This book was published in eReader format in 2005. The classroom photographs have been archived by Four Corners Archive.

In 1977 Wiedel was the first photographer to win the West Midlands Arts major bursary. She photographed and documented the lives of people in the West Midlands. For around two years in the late 1970s, Wiedel lived in her Volkswagen van in the Birmingham area photographing a range of people and industries, including miners, chain-makers, steel workers, jewellers and pottery workers.

This resulted in an Arts Council–sponsored book Vulcan's Forge (1979) and an exhibition at The Photographers' Gallery in London in 1979. A related TV programme, England their England: Camera in the Streets, was shown on ATV at 7.30 pm on Tuesday 9 May 1978 and reviewed by Keith Brace in the Birmingham Daily Post. The exhibition was laid out to try to give an impression of the working conditions and the atmosphere of the area. Instead of rows of uniformly sized photographs, there were sections devoted to different industries, some special lighting and audiovisual material as well as the videotape of the ATV programme. Vulcan's Forge was exhibited again in its entirety in 2021 at The Hive in Birmingham and reviewed by Josh Allen in Tribune.

Between 1977 and 1979 Wiedel and Rob Walker collaborated on a research study in a London secondary school. The project was supported by The Centre for Applied Research in Education (CARE) at the University of East Anglia. The study involved photographer and researcher working closely in selected classrooms photographing, interviewing, analysing and exhibiting the results along with feedback from students and teachers. The study was published in Field Methods in the Study of Education edited by Robert G Burgess. Wiedel's photographic contributions appear in chapter 10 'Using Photographs in a Discipline of Words'.

=== 1980s–1990s ===
Wiedel photographed the Greenham Common Women's Peace Camp from 1983 to 1984. In the same year that US cruise missiles arrived at RAF Greenham Common in Berkshire, Wiedel first visited the camp, which was a centre for peace and anti-nuclear movements and also became a symbol of the women's movement. She spent the next two years photographing and interviewing the women who lived there. Her work documents the lives and resistance of the women at the camp, made up of makeshift dwellings alongside the perimeter fence of the base.

In 1989 Wiedel won the South Eastern Arts Cross Channel Photographic Award, a one-year commission to photograph the town of Dover before the completion of the Channel Tunnel. Her book Dover: A Port in a Storm (1991) and her solo exhibition Dover and its People: Janine Wiedel (1991) at the Dover Museum and the County Hall Gallery in Maidstone were the results. Wiedel spent a year documenting life in Dover and the changes the Channel Tunnel would bring to the people and their culture, with the series capturing two juxtaposing ways of life in the town.

In 1991 she was awarded a one-year commission from the Gainsborough's House Museum to document the people of Sudbury (Suffolk). Her book on the subject, Faces with Voices, was published in 1992; and the exhibition Faces with Voices: Portraits from an English Community was shown at Gainsborough's House, and opened by Humphrey Spender in 1992. The exhibition then travelled with a British Council visual arts grant to the Goodnow Gallery in Sudbury, Massachusetts in 1994.

=== 2000s ===
Between 2001 and 2005 Wiedel documented the lives of the multicultural community in St Agnes Place, a squatted street in South London. In 2005 two hundred riot police evicted the occupants from 21 of the houses, leaving 150 homeless. Wiedel's photographs are a lasting record of their lives, stories and eventual eviction. Between 2002 and 2006 Wiedel photographed the Rastafarian and BAME community in London which included a food growing and food awareness programme (funded by London 21 and the Scarman Trust) in Brixton. In 2006 Wiedel co-ordinated and organised a talk, Groundation concert and multiscreen photographic presentation of the London Rastafarian community for the Profile Intermedia 9 conference The Tower of Babel at the Power House, Bremen, Germany.

In 2016 Wiedel spent six months photographing in the Calais jungle and the Grande-Synthe refugee camp in Dunkerque, resulting in an exhibition In Transit: Life in the Refugee Camps of Northern France.

From 1968 to the present Wiedel has been documenting protest, protest movements and multicultural communities. In 1974 Wiedel established a photo library which continues to be updated. Since 2003 the collection has been in the process of digitisation. Throughout her career, she has undertaken freelance commissions and taught in universities and art & design colleges as a part-time visiting lecturer.

Wiedel's exhibition Vulcan's Forge, originally shown at The Photographers' Gallery in London in 1979, returned to the West Midlands in November 2021. She wanted to invoke memories and revisit the images of how people worked and what their workplaces were like in the late 1970s. The exhibition was recreated at The Hive in the Jewellery Quarter of Birmingham from November 2021 to January 2022. This follow-up project included an appeal on local news to the people of Stoke-on-Trent to help find those who appeared in the photographs. As a result, Birmingham author Andy Conway was reunited with Wiedel who had photographed him as a schoolboy waiting at a factory gate 45 years previously.

In 2024 Wiedel republished her book Vulcans Forge, Industries of the West Midlands 1977-1979, in a large format with Bluecoat Press, incorporating a foreword by photographer Josh Allen.

== Publications ==
=== Books by Wiedel ===
- Looking at Iran written and photographed by Wiedel. UK: A & C Black, 1976. ISBN 071361806X. Philadelphia: Lippincott, 1976. ISBN 9780397317974.
- Irish Tinkers. UK: Latimer, 1976. ISBN 9780901539403. New York: St. Martin's, 1976, 1978. ISBN 978-0312436278. With a foreword and transcripts by Martina O'Fearadhaigh. Hardback.
  - London: Palgrave Macmillan, 1979. Softback.
  - Documentary-Photos, 2013. iBook for iPad and iPhone.
- Vulcan's Forge, London: Archetype Visual Studies, 1979. OCLC 78400929. With a foreword by Sue Davis. Catalogue of an exhibition at The Photographers' Gallery, London; Associated Television (ATV) Centre, Birmingham; and Stoke-on-Trent City Museum and Art Gallery (now known as the Potteries Museum & Art Gallery).
- Dover, a Port in a Storm: Twentieth Century Lives in an English Town. Cross Channel Photographic Mission, 1991. ISBN 9780951742709.
- Faces with Voices. Plymouth: Images, 1992. ISBN 9780948134333. Text by June Freeman and photographs by Wiedel. With a foreword by Ronald Blythe.
- Vulcans Forge, Industries of the West Midlands 1977-1979, Bluecoat Press 2024, ISBN 9781908457813. Large format book with foreword by photographer Josh Allen.
- Life at the Fence: Greenham Common Women's Peace Camp 1983/84, published by Image & Reality, 2025, ISBN 978-1-7384245-7-3.
- St Agnes Place Squat, published by RRB Photobooks, March 2026, ISBN 9781068386770.

=== Zines by Wiedel ===
- People's Park Berkeley Riots. Southport: Café Royal, 2019.
- Greenham Common Women's Peace Camp 1983–1984. Southport: Café Royal, 2019. Edition of 250 copies.
- Chainmaking: The Black Country, West Midlands 1977. Southport: Café Royal, 2018. Edited by Craig Atkinson. Edition of 250 copies.
- Coal Mining: The West Midlands 1978. Southport: Café Royal, 2018. Edited by Atkinson. Edition of 250 copies.
- Black Power: Black Panthers: 1969. Southport: Café Royal, 2017. Later reprinted twice.
- Black Power: Black Panthers: 1970. Southport: Café Royal, 2017. Second edition, 2017. Edition of 200 copies.
- Smiths' Drop Forge: Birmingham 1976. Southport: Café Royal, 2017. Edited by Atkinson. Edition of 200 copies.
- Iron and Steel: The West Midlands 1977. Southport: Café Royal, 2017. Edited by Atkinson. Edition of 200 copies.
- Industry, West Midlands: 1977–1979. Includes seven separate zines in a box set: Industries The West Midlands 1977–1979 (exclusive to this box set), Smiths' Drop Forge: Birmingham 1976, Iron and Steel: The West Midlands 1977, Coal Mining: The West Midlands 1978, Coal Mining: The West Midlands 1978, Chainmaking: The Black Country, West Midlands 1977, The Jewellery Quarter: Birmingham: 1977, and The Potteries: Stoke-on-Trent: 1978. Edition of 100 copies.
- Saintes Maries Gypsy Festival Camargue 1974. Southport: Café Royal, 2020. Edited by Atkinson. Edition of 250 copies.
- Iran 1976. Southport: Café Royal, 2020. Edited by Atkinson.
- Port of Dover 1989–90. Southport: Café Royal, 2020. Edited by Atkinson.
- Leisure Time Dover 1989–90. Southport: Café Royal, 2020. Edited by Atkinson.
- Arctic Summer 1973. Southport: Café Royal, 2022. Edited by Atkinson.
- High-Rise 1983: Part One. Southport: Café Royal, 2022. Edited by Atkinson.
- High-Rise 1983: Part Two. Southport: Café Royal, 2022. Edited by Atkinson.

=== Publications with contributions by Wiedel ===
- A Guide to Classroom Observation. London: Methuen, 1975. By Rob Walker and Clem Adelman, with photographs by Wiedel. ISBN 9780416812107.
- British Journal of Photography Annual 1981. Henry Greenwood, 1980. ISBN 0900414197, 9780900414190.
- Lichtbildnisse: das Porträt in der Fotografie. Klaus Honnef, Jan Thorn Prikker, and Rheinisches Landesmuseum Bonn. Cologne: Rheinland-Verlag, 1982. ISBN 379270661X and ISBN 9783792706619.
- Field Methods in the Study of Education. Edited by Robert G. Burgess. London: Falmer, 1985. Chapter 10: ‘Using photographs in discipline of words' by Rob Walker with photographs by Wiedel. ISBN 1850000123 and ISBN 9781850000129.
- A Woman's Place: The Changing Picture of Women in Britain. Harmondsworth & New York, Penguin Books, 1986. By Diana Souhami with photographs by Wiedel. ISBN 0140086099, 9780140086096.
- Industrial Image: British Industrial Photography 1843 to 1986. By Sue Davies and Caroline Collier with photographs by Wiedel. London, Photographers' Gallery, 1986. ISBN 9780907879114 and ISBN 090787911X.
- British Journal of Photography Annual 1992. London: Bouverie, 1991. ISBN 0900414405, 9780900414404.
- Black Country Working Women. By Clare Wightman. Wolverhampton, Light House Media Centre, 1991. ISBN 0951232827 and ISBN 9780951232828.
- Soundings. Maidstone, Kent: Cross Channel Photographic Mission, 1994. Edited by Jane Alison and Brigitte Lardinois. ISBN 9780951742754. With an introduction by Neal Ascherson.
- Research as Social Change, New Opportunities for Qualitative Research. Michael Schratz and Rob Walker. London: Routledge, 1995. Wiedel contributes to the chapter 'Being there: using pictures to see the invisible'. ISBN 0415118697 and ISBN 9780415118699. eBook (2005) ISBN 9780203014004.
- Picturing Childhood: The Myth of the Child in Popular Imagery. Patricia Holland. London & New York: I.B. Tauris, 2004. ISBN 1860647758.
- Great Brixton: A Photobook of Brixton's Greatness. The Champion Agency, 2015. ISBN 0993451306 and ISBN 9780993451300.
- The British Life Photography Awards: Portfolio 1: The winning images from the inaugural British Life Photography Awards. The British Life Photography Awards (Contributor). London. Ilex, 2015. ISBN 178157264X, 9781781572641.
- British Life Photography Awards: Portfolio 2. Stockport: Dewi Lewis, UK ed, 2016. ISBN 1907893881, 9781907893889.
- British Life Photography Awards: Portfolio 3. BLPA, CLOC Ltd. 2017. Not published with an ISBN.
- Photoworks Annual, Issue 25. Brighton. Photoworks and Arts Council England. 2019. Includes a chapter by Wiedel "The London Fancy Box Company, Dover", from the series, Dover: A Port in a Storm, 1989–1990. ISBN 9781903796559
- Online booket You Can't Beat a Woman: The story of the founding of refuges. June Freeman & Ravi Thiara. 2018. A Heritage Lottery project.
- Coal Faces, edited by David Gilbert Wright, published by Image & Reality, 2024. ISBN 9781738424528 Hardback, ISBN 9781738424535 Paperback.

== Exhibitions ==
=== Solo exhibitions ===
- Janine Wiedel, The Photographers' Gallery, London, 1974. Photographs of an Inuit family on Baffin Island and of Irish travellers.
- Classrooms: Janine Wiedel, The Half Moon Gallery, London, 1977.
- Classrooms: Janine Wiedel, touring exhibition by The Half Moon Photography Workshop. 1977.
- Vulcan's Forge: Face of the West Midlands by Janine Wiedel, The Photographers' Gallery, London, 1979.
- Vulcan's Forge: Janine Wiedel, Stoke-on-Trent City Museum and Art Gallery, 1980.
- Industries and Life in the West Midlands by Janine Wiedel, Ikon Gallery, Birmingham. 1980.
- Vulcan's Forge: Janine Wiedel, ATV Centre, Birmingham, 1980.
- British Women: Janine Wiedel, Invicta Radio Station, Canterbury, 1990.
- Dover and its People: Janine Wiedel, Dover Museum (as part of the White Cliffs Experience), Dover, 1991.
- Dover and its People: Janine Wiedel, County Hall Gallery, Maidstone, 1991.
- Faces with Voices: Portraits from an English community: Janine Wiedel, Gainsborough's House, Sudbury, 1992.
- Faces with Voices: Portraits from an English community: Janine Wiedel, Focal Point Gallery, Southend, 1992/93.
- Faces with Voices: Portraits from an English community: Janine Wiedel, Goodnow Gallery, Sudbury, Massachusetts, USA, 1994.
- Vulcan's Forge: Janine Wiedel, The Hive, Birmingham, 2021/22

=== Collaborative exhibitions ===
- Rastafari 2006: Ras Napthali and Janine Wiedel, Rastafari Documentation Photos at the Profile Intermedia 9 Conference Tower of Babel, 2006, Bremen, Germany
- In Transit: Life in the Refugee Camps of Northern France, Gallery 101, International Headquarters of The Salvation Army, London, 2017. With Jacky Chapman This exhibition was also shown in the following locations: Dulwich College, London, 2016; South Hampstead High School, London, 2018; The Steeple, Dundee, Scotland, 2019
- Black Country Living, Blast! Festival of Photography, Talks and Walks, Sandwell Borough, West Midlands, 2019. With John Myers.
- Still: Stories from the Jewellery Quarter, Iron House Gallery, Birmingham, 2019. Wiedel's photographs of the Jewellery Quarter were displayed alongside work by Andy Pilsbury and Inès Elsa Dalal.

=== Group exhibitions ===
- WIAC 1900–1975, Women's International Art Club, Camden Arts Centre, London, 1975
- Children Photographed, travelling Arts Council exhibition by the Children's Rights Workshop & IKON. First shown at the Shaw Theatre, Euston Road, London, 1976.
- Art for Society, Whitechapel Gallery, London, 1978
- Realising Design, Institute of Contemporary Arts, London, 1978/79
- A Woman's Place: The Changing Picture of Women in Britain. A British Council exhibition first shown at the Royal Festival Hall, London, 1984. The exhibition subsequently toured overseas in 30 countries.
- Industrial Image: British Industrial Photography 1834–1986, The Photographers' Gallery, London, 1986/87
- Black Country Working Women. Arts Council touring exhibition first shown at the Light House Media Centre, Wolverhampton Art Gallery, Wolverhampton, 1990.
- Resistance is Fertile: The Art of Protest, Ovada Gallery, Oxford, 2015
- British Life Photography Awards 2016, The Mall Galleries, London, 2016. Prize winner in two categories, 'Life at Work' and 'Historic Britain'.
- Industrial Might, Black Country Living Museum, Dudley, 19 May 2018 (part of the Reclaim Photography Festival). Wiedel showed a selection of images from Chainmaking, The Black Country, 1977.
- You Can't Beat a Woman: The story of the founding of refuges. January 2019. The Minories, Colchester and Espacio Gallery, Bethnal Green
- Art Against Racism, The Movement Photography Gallery. Online exhibition. 2021.
- Light Years: The Photographers' Gallery at 50, The Photographers' Gallery, London, 2021/22.
- War Inna Babylon: The Community's Struggle for Truths and Rights. Institute of Contemporary Arts, London, 2021.
- Intersectional Geographies, Martin Parr Foundation, Bristol, 2022. A group exhibition curated by Jacqueline Ennis Cole.
- Cafe Royal Books, Documentary, Zines and Subversion, Martin Parr Foundation, Paintworks, Bristol. 14 April – 12 June 2022.
- Resistance. An exhibition conceived by filmmaker Steve McQueen and curated by Clarrie Wallis, Turner Contemporary, Margate, 22 February - 1 June 2025.

== Awards and awarded commissions ==
- 1977: West Midlands Arts Award. One year bursary.
- 1989: Cross Channel Photographic Award, South Eastern Arts. One year commission to photograph the town of Dover before the completion of the Channel Tunnel.
- 1991: Gainsborough's House Museum. One-year commission documenting the people of Sudbury.
- 2014: Commended, Historic Britain category, British Life Photography Awards, for "Smith's Drop Forge (1977)".
- 2015: Winner, Life at Work category, British Life Photography Awards, for "Throwing and Winding, Silk Weaving, West Suffolk".
- 2015: Winner, Historic Britain category, British Life Photography Awards, for "Standing up against Apartheid, Trafalgar Square, London 1985".
- 2015: Highly commended, Historic Britain category, British Life Photography Awards, for "After the Queen's Silver Jubilee 1977, Resting with the Queen".
- 2016: Winner, Life at Work category, British Life Photography Awards.
- 2016: Winner, Historic Britain category, British Life Photography Awards.
- 2017: Winner, Historic category, British Life Photography Awards, for "Alan and fellow workers on midday break".
- 2017: Commended, Life at Work category, British Life Photography Awards, for "Loom-Weaver".
- 2025: Honorary Fellow of the Royal Photographic Society in recognition of a significant personal achievement in photography.

== Television and media ==
- Camera in the Streets, TV documentary by Associated Television about Wiedel, 1978. Recording held by the BFI Mediatheque archive collection, Brum & Beyond: West Midlands on Screen.
- A series of oral history interviews with Wiedel, held between 1980 and 1990. Photographers' Gallery Recordings at the British Library, London.
- Documentary stills from the town of Shildon, Co. Durham after the closure of the railway works. Thames TV, March 3, 1986.
- BBC Radio Stoke, Hunt for industrial workers in Stoke-on-Trent photos, Lee Blackman interviews Janine Wiedel, 8 December 2021.
- BBC Midlands Today, Evening News, 13 December 2021.
- Interview with Mark Bentley, featured in Black & White Photography Magazine, Issue 292, 2024.

== Collections ==
Wiedel's work is held in the following permanent collections:

- Four Corners Gallery, London: 36 works (as of 12 July 2023)
- Martin Parr Foundation, Bristol: at least 21 prints from Vulcan's Forge (as of 12 July 2023)
- Museum of Modern Art, New York: 1 portrait of Edward Steichen
