= Douglas Corrance =

Scottish photographer (born 1947)

Douglas Corrance (born 1947) is a Scottish photographer who has made books about life across Scotland, including Glasgow and Edinburgh, as well as guides to Japan, France, India, and New York City. His work is held in the collection of the Scottish National Portrait Gallery.

== Life and work ==
Corrance grew up in Inverness and began working in the darkroom at the Highland News there, at age 15. Within 6 months he was promoted to newspaper photographer. For a couple of years in the 1960s, he worked as a photographer in Sydney, Australia. At least in the late 1970s, he worked as a photographer for the Scottish Tourist Board. He has also worked at Scotland on Sunday. Corrance has made photography books about life across Scotland, including Glasgow in at least the 1970s and 1980s. He has also created guides to New York City, Japan, France, and India.

== Publications ==
=== Books by Corrance ===
- Edinburgh. Glasgow: Collins, 1979. ISBN 9780004111438. With captions by W. Gordon Smith.
- Edinburgh in Colour. London: Batsford, 1980. ISBN 9780713419986. With an introduction and commentaries by John Hutchinson.
- Glasgow. Collins, 1981. Photographs by Corrance, with commentary by Edward Boyd. ISBN 978-0004356679.
- Scotland: Five Decades of Photographs by Douglas Corrance: with text by Magnus Linklater. Collins, 1984. ISBN 9780004356778. With text by Magnus Linklater
- Glasgow: from the Eye in the Sky. Edinburgh: Mainstream, 1988. ISBN 9781851581689. With text by Ian Archer.
- Glasgow. Hong Kong: Apa, 1990. ISBN 9780245600494. Edited and produced by Marcus Brooke and Brian Bell.
- Côte d'Azur. Insight Guides, 291. Boston, MA: Houghton Mifflin; Hong Kong: APA, 1993. With Catherine Karnow. ISBN 9780395657744. Edited by Rosemary Bailey.
- New York. Ljubljana: DZS, 1997. Edited by David Wickers and Charlotte Atkins. ISBN 9788634115345.
- The French Riviera. Insight guides. France series. London: Apa, 1998. With Karnow. ISBN 9780887295911. Edited by Bailey.
- Scotland: a Visual Journey. Edinburgh: Mainstream, 1999. ISBN 9781840182514.
- Scotland: Five Decades of Photographs by Douglas Corrance. Lomond, 2012. ISBN 9781842042960.

=== Zines by Corrance ===
- Glasgow 1970s–1980s. Southport: Café Royal, 2020.
- Scotland 1960s–1980s. Southport: Café Royal, 2020.
- New York 1970s–1980s. Southport: Café Royal, 2021.

== Collections ==
Corrance's work is held in the following permanent collection:

- Scottish National Portrait Gallery, Edinburgh
