= Alejandro Guijarro =

Spanish contemporary artist

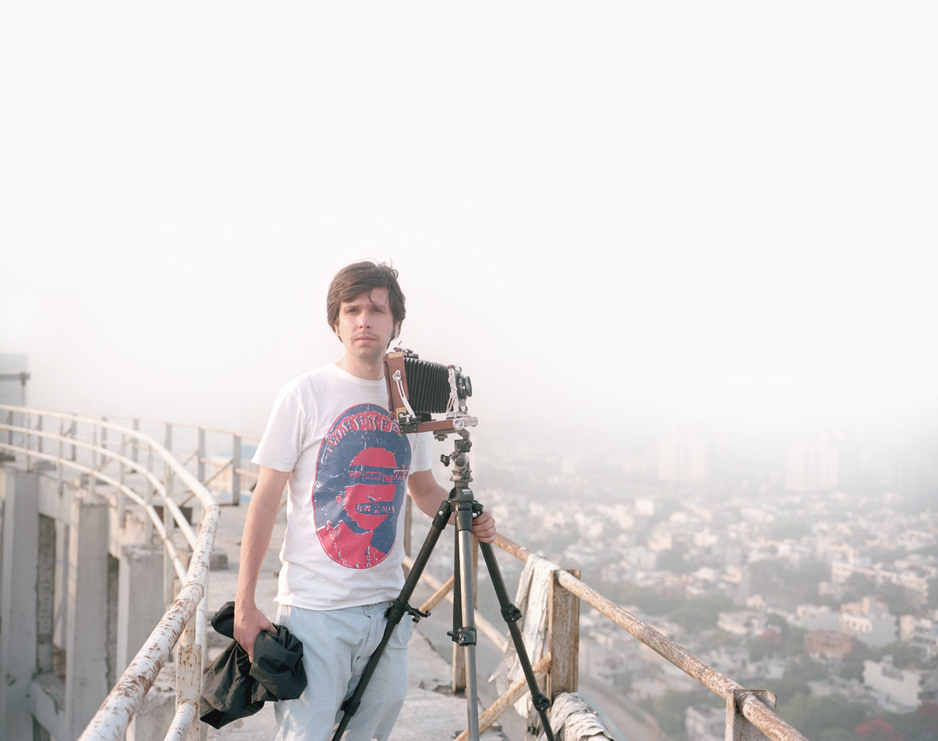
- Born: 1979 (age 46–47); Madrid, Spain
- Education: MFA Photography, Royal College of Art
- Movement: Contemporary Art
- Website: www.alejandroguijarro.com

Alejandro Guijarro (born 1979) is a Spanish contemporary artist who currently works between London and Madrid.

== Early life ==
Guijarro was born in Madrid, where he began his artistic education at the Escuela de Arte N10, completing a BA (Hons) in Graphic Design in 2004. He then moved to London to attend the Royal College of Art, where he graduated from the MFA Photography programme in 2010.

== Major works ==
His first major series, Momentum, received international critical acclaim, and can be found in the permanent collections of Saatchi Gallery, London, the Frank Suss Collection, New York City/London, and the Goetz Collection, Germany. Over the course of three years, between 2012 and 2015, Guijarro travelled to various quantum mechanics institutions around the world – from Cambridge and Oxford in the United Kingdom, to CERN in Switzerland, and MIT and UC Berkeley in the United States – photographing the blackboards as he found them, and reproducing them at 1:1 scale.

Momentum has been exhibited at Tristan Hoare, London, in 2012, at the Google Headquarters, New York and at The Contemporary Collectors Club, New York in 2013, and at Marlborough Gallery for PHotoEspaña15 in Madrid in 2015.

His second photographic series – LEAD – was shown in Spring 2017 at Tristan Hoare. For this, Guijarro visited the conservation departments at the Louvre, the Prado Museum and The National Gallery and photographed the X-rays and infrared scans of many prominent Old Master paintings, including the Mona Lisa by Leonardo da Vinci, The Battle of San Romano by Paolo Uccello, the Annunciation by Robert Campin, and Adam and Eve by Peter Paul Rubens.

== Publications ==
=== Zine by Guijarro ===
- Momentum Series. Southport, UK: Café Royal, 2016. With a text by Francis Hodgson. Edition of 200 copies.

=== Publications with contributions by Guijarro ===
- Picking Up, Bouncing Back. By Alexander Garcia Düttman, Jean-Luc Nancy, and Olivier Richon. Edited by Rut Blees Luxemburg. London, Royal College of Art, 2010. ISBN 978-1907342073.
- New Order: British Art Today. By Phillipa Adams. London: Saatchi Gallery, 2014. ISBN 978-1-909413-02-3. Exhibition Catalogue.
- Blackboard - Art from Teaching / Learning from Art. Artipelag katalog 7. By Frida Andersson and Jessica Höglund. Värmdö, Sweden: Artipelag Konsthall, 2013. ISBN 978-91-980428-6-3. Exhibition Catalogue.
- Post-Photography: The Artist with the Camera. By Robert Shore. London: Elephant; Laurence King, 2014. ISBN 978-1780672281.

== Awards ==
- 2004. Premio de Fotografia Ministero de Economia, Spain (third place).
- 2007. ITS SIX(International Talent Support), Italy (finalist).
- 2009. The Villiers David Travel Award, London (winner).
- 2009. Royal College of Art Bursary, London (winner).
- 2009. Man Photography Prize, London (finalist).
- 2010. E-Creative Award, London (finalist).
- 2011. Festival international de Mode et de Photographie à Hyères, France (Shortlisted).
- 2013. PHotoEspaña13. Descubrimientos, Spain (finalist).
- 2015. Prix Pictet, London/Switzerland (Nomination).
