= Brian David Stevens =

British photographer

Brian David Stevens (born 1970) is a British photographer, based in London. He has made work on sound systems of Notting Hill Carnival, war veterans, the Grenfell Tower fire, the British coastline and the suicide spot of Beachy Head. Stevens' work is held in the collections of the National Portrait Gallery, London and National Galleries of Scotland.

== Life and work ==
Stevens is based in London, where he has made a number of photography projects. In 2004 and 2016 he photographed sound systems of Notting Hill Carnival. Each year between 2002 and 2012 he made portraits of war veterans following a ceremony at The Cenotaph on Remembrance Sunday—just their faces photographed close-up, without cap badges, medals and insignia, against a black cloth to obscure the background, and without identifying names in the captions. He photographed the aftermath of the Grenfell Tower fire every day for a month in 2017.

Stevens has also made work elsewhere. He created diptychs from images taken on the shores of Britain, looking out to sea. He spent 12 months documenting the area between Beachy Head and Birling Gap, in the South Downs National Park in southern England, an infamous suicide spot.

== Publications ==
=== Books by Stevens ===
- Brighter Later. Tartaruga, 2015. With an essay by Melissa Harrison. Edition of 500 copies.
- Beachy Head. Another Place, 2017. ISBN 978-1-9997424-2-3. Edition of 200 copies.
- Doggerland. Another Place, 2018. ISBN 978-1-9996077-3-9. Edition of 200 copies.

=== Books with others ===
- There's Always Death To Fall Back On. Silverhill Press Photography Number 8. Silver Hill, 2019. With John Moore.

=== Zines by Stevens ===
- It Is Alright To Adore Yourself And Everyone. Hamburger Eyes, 2010.
- Wouldn't You Be Rather Be Watching This On Television. Hamburger Eyes, 2011. Edition of 100 copies.
- Tyburn Hemp. Southport: Café Royal, 2013. Edition of 150 copies.
- Mayday. Southport: Café Royal, 2014. Edition of 150 copies.
- Notting Hill Sound Systems. Southport: Café Royal, 2014. Edition of 150 copies.
- Billy Childish. Southport: Café Royal, 2014. Edition of 200 copies.
- Haslingfield Scarecrows. Southport: Café Royal, 2015. Edition of 200 copies.
- Notting Hill Soundsystems 2. Southport: Café Royal, 2017. Edition of 350 copies.

=== Screenprint boxsets by Stevens ===
- Notting Hill Sound Systems. Tartaruga, 2014.
- Notting Hill Sound Systems II. Tartaruga.

=== Publications with contributions by Stevens ===
- Inside Burgerworld. Brooklyn: Powerhouse, 2007. Edited by Ray Potes. ISBN 978-1-57687-407-3.
- Assignments 3. Press Photographer's Year, 2008.
- Stop The War A Graphic History. Francis Boutle, 2011. ISBN 978-1903427590. With a foreword by Tony Benn.
- Mankind Issue 1. Hamburger Eyes, 2012.
- The Colony Room Club 1948–2008: A History of Bohemian Soho. Palmtree, 2012. By Sophie Parkin. ISBN 978-0-9574354-1-4.

== Collections ==
Stevens' work is held in the following permanent collections:

- National Galleries of Scotland: 3 prints (as of April 2020)
- National Portrait Gallery, London: 1 print (as of April 2020)
