= Gonzalo Guijarro =

Spanish footballer

Personal information
- Full name: Gonzalo Guijarro Rodríguez
- Date of birth: 1 January 1996 (age 30)
- Place of birth: Madridejos, Spain
- Height: 1.84 m (6 ft 0 in)
- Position: Centre back

Team information
- Current team: Gibraltar United
- Number: 3

Youth career
- Toledo
- 2014–2015: Levante

Senior career*
Years	Team	Apps	(Gls)
2015	Madridejos	0	(0)
2015–2016	Villacañas	22	(1)
2016–2017	Toledo B	34	(0)
2017–2018	Alcorcón B	21	(0)
2017	Alcorcón	0	(0)
2018–	Gibraltar United	26	(0)
- * Club domestic league appearances and goals as of 13 May 2019

Gonzalo Guijarro Rodríguez (born 1 January 1996) is a Spanish footballer who plays for Gibraltarian club Gibraltar United FC. Mainly a central defender, he can also play as a left back.

== Club career ==
Born in Madridejos, Toledo, Castile-La Mancha, Gonzalo finished his formation with Levante UD. On 18 July 2015 he moved to Tercera División side CD Madridejos, but after failing to make an appearance for the side, he subsequently moved to CD Villacañas in the regional leagues.

In 2016 Gonzalo joined CD Toledo, club he already represented as a youth, and was assigned to the reserves also in the fourth level. On 23 June of the following year, he signed for another reserve team, AD Alcorcón B in the same division.

Gonzalo made his first team debut on 7 September 2017, starting in a 2–4 home loss against Cultural y Deportiva Leonesa, for the season's Copa del Rey. On 3 July of the following year, he moved abroad for the first time in his career after signing for Gibraltar United FC.
