= Robert Ormerod =

Scottish photographer

Robert Ormerod (born 1985) is a Scottish photographer, based in Edinburgh.

== Life and work ==
Ormerod was born in 1985 in Scotland. He grew up in Aberdeen. In 2010 he completed an NCTJ press photography course at Norton College in Sheffield and in 2007 gained a BA in journalism from the University of Stirling.

He has done work about pigeon fanciers in Glasgow and Edinburgh who practice "doo fleein'", the "doomen" and "doowomen" who lure another enthusiast's male bird using a female; people in dance halls at community centres in Edinburgh; Scottish independence in the lead up to the 2014 Scottish independence referendum through a reenactment of the Battle of Bannockburn and people he found while travelling along the M8 motorway between Edinburgh and Glasgow; politically engaged young Scots in the period after Scotland decided against independence from the UK in the 2014 referendum and since the 2016 vote in favour of Brexit; and households using their gardens whilst under lockdown in Edinburgh, during the COVID-19 pandemic, photographed from above using an aerial camera.

Ormerod's long-term project about space enthusiasts, Above Us the Day, has involved photographing the mythology around UFO sightings on a road trip from Roswell, New Mexico (sight of the Roswell UFO incident) to Area 51 in Nevada, USA; amateur rocket builders at events in the Highlands of Scotland and Nevada; moonscapes and people who chase the northern lights, made while travelling around Iceland's Ring Road, Route 1; and attendees of Space Camp for Interested Visually Impaired Students.

He lives in Edinburgh.
