= Tristan Hoare =

Coordinates: 51°31′24.51″N 0°8′22.61″W

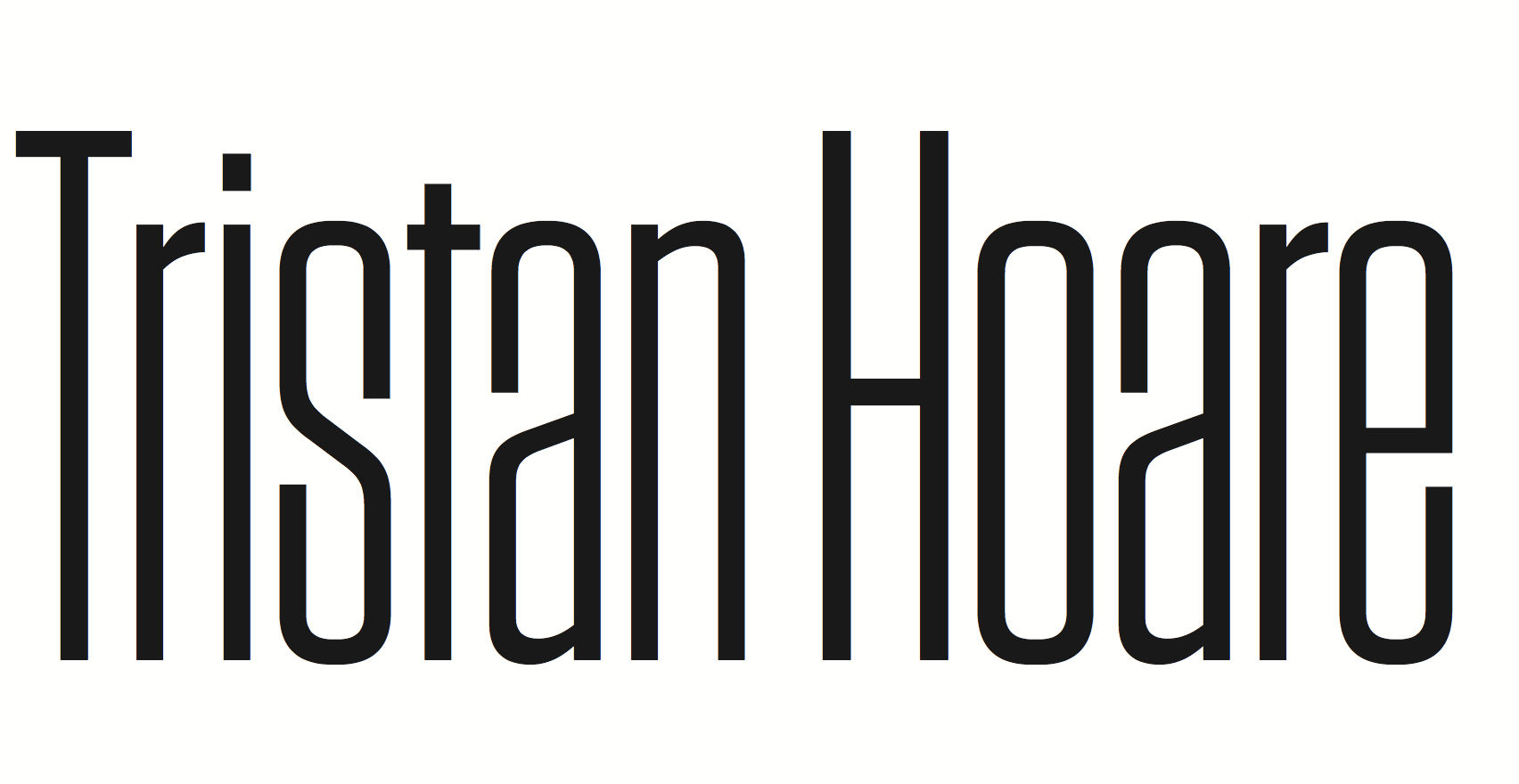

- Company type: Contemporary art gallery
- Founded: 2009
- Founder: Tristan Hoare
- Website: www.tristanhoare.co.uk

Tristan Hoare is an art dealer and contemporary art gallery in London that focusses on emerging and established artists.

== History ==
The gallery was established in 2009 by Tristan Hoare. Between 2009 and 2013, it was located at Lichfield Studios, the former studio of British photographer Patrick Lichfield between 1984 and 2005. The gallery's new premises at 6 Fitzroy Square opened in September 2016. The building was designed by Georgian architect Robert Adam and completed in 1798.
