= Rachel Sussman =

American photographer

- Born: 1975 (age 50–51)
- Education: School of Visual Arts; Bard College
- Known for: photography
- Notable work: “Oldest Living Things in the World”
- Website: http://www.rachelsussman.com

Rachel Sussman (born 1975) is an American contemporary artist and photographer based in Brooklyn.

== Biography ==
Born into a non-religious Jewish family, Sussman started photographing when she was about 10 years old. In a lecture given in 2019 at the Center for the Study of World Religions of Harvard Divinity School, she explained: "I grew up in a pretty abusive family, pretty rough childhood. And nature was one of the first things that I really connected with. It really without knowing it became a guiding force for me".

She graduated from the School of Visual Arts in New York with a BFA, studied at the Bard College MFA program, and began a practice-based fine arts PhD at Central Saint Martins in London. Sussman is a Guggenheim and MacDowell Colony Fellow, spoke about her work at the TEDGlobal conference in 2010, and was a 2016 TED Resident. Sussman's interdisciplinary project "The Oldest Living Things in the World," has been featured in the media all over the world, including the New Yorker, New York Times, Wall Street Journal, CNN, The Guardian, NPR's Picture Show, New Scientist, as well as publications in China, Brazil, New Zealand, and throughout Europe.

In 2008 critic Jerry Saltz cited her work as the "best photography that slipped under the radar" in New York Magazine, having stated in the exhibition review:

“These stately pictures quiet the soul: You enter a reverie wondering how these organisms managed to live so long and if there’s anything in them that might help us stave off the inevitable…Sussman brings you to the place where science, beauty, and eternity meet”

Sussman continues to make artwork about connecting personal time to cosmic time through new installation-based works. These include a sand mandala of the Cosmic microwave background at the New Museum Los Gatos, the destruction of which was covered by WIRED Magazine, a handwritten timeline of the history of the spacetime continuum at MASS MoCA, and Sidewalk Kintsukuroi, a contemporary take on the Japanese art of repairing broken pottery with gold, at the Des Moines Art Center.

Sussman is a 2016–2017 artist in residence with the SETI Institute.

== “Oldest Living Things in the World” ==
From 2004 to 2014, Sussman researched, worked with biologists, and traveled all over the world to find and photograph continuously living organisms 2,000 years old and older. Sussman says "The project is part art and part science. There's an environmental component. And I'm also trying to create a means in which to step outside our quotidian experience of time and to start to consider a deeper timescale. I selected 2,000 years as my minimum age because I wanted to start at what we consider to be year zero and work back from there."

Her book of the same title was published April 2014, containing essays from Hans Ulrich Obrist and Carl Zimmer, and is a New York Times Bestseller. In his essay, Hans Ulrich Obrist states:

"What sets Sussman apart from other conceptual artists is that her research project is closely related to the research of a scientist....the Oldest Living Things is a category that is defined by curiosity, humane character, a fascination with deep time, and the courage of an explorer"

The book is currently in print in Complex and Simple Chinese, Korean, and German.

== Awards and nominations ==
- Guggenheim Fellowship, Photography, 2014
- LACMA Lab Art + Tech grant, 2014
- NYFA Fellowship, Photography, 2013
- Prix Pictet nomination, London/Geneva 2009, 2010, 2011
- British Council Darwin Now Award, Finalist. London, 2009
- University of Pennsylvania, Graduate Humanities Forum on Origins, 2008

== Exhibitions ==
- Des Moines Art Center: Alchemy: Transformations in Gold. Sidewalk Kintsukuroi, acquisition. Feb 17
- New Museum Los Gatos: New works by SETI Artists, Cosmic Microwave Mandala. Oct 16 – Mar 17
- MASS MoCA: Explode Every Day: An Inquiry into the Phenomena of Wonder, May 2016– Mar 2017
- MASS MoCA: The Space Between, Sidewalk Kintsukuroi, permanent installation, April 2016
- Hotchkiss School Tremaine Gallery, The Oldest Living Things in the World. Jan-°©Mar 2016
- National Museum of Wildlife Art: The Oldest Living Things in the World. May-°©Aug 2015
- Bucknell University Samek Museum: The Oldest Living Things in the World. Jan–Mar 2015
- National Museum of Women in the Arts: Women to Watch 2015. Washington, DC. May–Sept 2015
- National Academy of Sciences: Imagining Deep Time, Aug 2014 – Jan 2015
- Pioneer Works: Inaugural exhibition, The Oldest Living Things in the World. Brooklyn, New York. Sept – Nov 2014
- Staatliche Kunsthalle Baden-Baden: Site-specific solo Exhibition. April – June 2012
- Museum of Contemporary Photography: Our Origins. Chicago. July – Oct 2011

== Speaking Engagements and Appearances ==
- The Center for the Study of World Religions, Harvard Divinity School: the Time in the World: An Artist’s Awakening with Ayahuasca, November 14, 2019
- Temple University: Visualizing Sustainability (Philadelphia, Sept 2016)
- Harvard University Arnold Arboretum Director's Lecture Series (Cambridge, MA, Dec 2015)
- The Long Now Foundation (San Francisco, Nov 2010)
- CreativeMornings (Brooklyn, August 27, 2010)
- CNN World Report. (July 28, 2010)
- TED Global Conference (Oxford, July 2010)
- NHPR. Word of Mouth. (April 26, 2010)
- GEL Conference (New York, April 2010)
- Thomas P. Johnson Distinguished Visiting Artist, Rollins College, 2007
