= Greg Miller (photographer) =

American photographer

Greg Miller (born 1967) is an American photographer based in Connecticut. He was awarded a Guggenheim Fellowship in 2008. He is known for his use of a large format camera.

== Biography ==
Miller was born in Nashville, Tennessee in 1967. He started his commercial photography career in 1988. He graduated from the School of Visual Arts in 1990 with a bachelor of fine arts degree in photography. His projects include photographs of county fairs, marching band camps, Ash Wednesday rites of New Yorkers in Midtown Manhattan and school children waiting for the morning bus in Connecticut. He is a teacher of photography in the International Center of Photography in New York City.

Miller lives in Connecticut with his wife and daughters.

== Awards ==
- 2008: Guggenheim Fellowship from the John Simon Guggenheim Memorial Foundation.
