= 2007 Sedgefield Borough Council election =

2007 UK local government election

Results of the 2007 Sedgefield Borough Council elections

Elections to Sedgefield Borough Council were held on 3 May 2007. The whole council was up for election and the Labour Party stayed in overall control of the council.

A notable result was in New Trimdon and Trimdon Grange ward where the Conservative Party candidate Shirley Bowes obtained no votes.

This was the last Sedgefield borough election to be held during the premiership of the borough's then MP, Tony Blair, who resigned as Prime Minister and as the Member for Sedgefield the following month.

== Election result ==
Sedgefield local election result 2007
Party	Seats	Gains	Losses	Net gain/loss	Seats %	Votes %	Votes	+/−
Labour	28	3	10	-7	56.0	47.8	28,687	-8.9
Independent	15	10	2	+8	30.0	26.8	16,071	+5.6
Liberal Democrats	6	0	1	-1	12.0	12.9	7,761	-2.5
Conservative	1	0	0	0	2.0	5.5	3,276	+0.7
BNP	0	0	0	0	0.0	6.6	3,958	+6.0
UKIP	0	0	0	0	0.0	0.4	247	New

== Ward results ==
Bishop Middleham and Cornforth (2)
Party	Candidate	Votes	%	±%
Labour	Alan Hodgson	600		
Independent	Tony Brimm	499		
Labour	Mick Simpson	485		
Conservative	Robert Bagshaw	272		
BNP	Christopher Gibson	127		
Turnout		1,983		
Labour hold		Swing		
Independent gain from Labour		Swing		

Broom (3)
Party	Candidate	Votes	%	±%
Labour	Pauline Crathorne	603		
Labour	Bernard Lamb	602		
Labour	David Newell	579		
Independent	Brian Gibson	471		
Independent	Tommy Garrett	428		
Independent	George Morgan	277		
Independent	Brian Meek	276		
Independent	Eric Gillingham	157		
Conservative	Margaret Waller	123		
BNP	Peter Sewell	117		
Turnout		3,633		
Labour hold		Swing		
Labour hold		Swing		
Labour hold		Swing		

Byerley (2)
Party	Candidate	Votes	%	±%
Liberal Democrats	James Huntington	596		
Liberal Democrats	Gareth Howe	383		
Labour	James Younghusband	258		
Independent	Ricky Matthews	244		
Independent	Ann Hammond	211		
Labour	Gloria Wills	206		
BNP	Paul Clarke	101		
Turnout		1,999		
Liberal Democrats hold		Swing		
Liberal Democrats hold		Swing		

Chilton (3)
Party	Candidate	Votes	%	±%
Labour	Christine Potts	978		
Labour	Brian Avery	967		
Labour	Frank Forrest	826		
BNP	Carl Whelpdale	649		
Turnout		3,420		
Labour hold		Swing		
Labour hold		Swing		
Labour hold		Swing		

Ferryhill (3)
Party	Candidate	Votes	%	±%
Independent	David Farry	577		
Labour	Jim Higgin	549		
Labour	Kath Conroy	546		
Liberal Democrats	Paul Mountford	501		
Independent	Kevin Storey	482		
Labour	Ron Patchett	463		
BNP	Robert Gray	151		
Turnout		3,269		
Independent gain from Labour		Swing		
Labour hold		Swing		
Labour hold		Swing		

Fishburn and Old Trimdon (3)
Party	Candidate	Votes	%	±%
Labour	John Burton	921		
Labour	Terence Ward	845		
Labour	David Chaytor	816		
Liberal Democrats	Mark Mountford	360		
Conservative	Christine Moyle	346		
BNP	Michael Harnett	261		
Turnout		3,549		
Labour hold		Swing		
Labour hold		Swing		
Labour hold		Swing		

Greenfield Middridge (3)
Party	Candidate	Votes	%	±%
Independent	Irene Hewitson	522		
Labour	Dorothy Bowman	499		
Labour	Vincent Crosby	490		
Independent	June Croft	484		
Independent	Alison Palmer	478		
Labour	Brian Hall	445		
Conservative	Nick Crass	261		
BNP	Clive Cooper	164		
Turnout		3,343		
Independent hold		Swing		
Labour hold		Swing		
Labour hold		Swing		

Low Spennymoor and Tudhoe Grange (3)
Party	Candidate	Votes	%	±%
Labour	Andrew Gray	846		
Labour	Andrew Smith	837		
Labour	John Khan	791		
Liberal Democrats	Clive Maddison	567		
BNP	Adam Walker	557		
Liberal Democrats	Bill Scott	542		
Liberal Democrats	Martin Jones	512		
Conservative	Paul Carmedy	191		
Turnout		4,843		
Labour hold		Swing		
Labour hold		Swing		
Labour hold		Swing		

Middlestone (3)
Party	Candidate	Votes	%	±%
Labour	William Waters	720		
Liberal Democrats	Kevin Thompson	644		
Labour	Colin Nelson	595		
Liberal Democrats	Christine Sproat	557		
Labour	Marie Predki	535		
BNP	Ian Moore	435		
Liberal Democrats	Calvin Kipling	386		
Conservative	Mark Abley	294		
Independent	Russell Stewart	164		
Turnout		4,330		
Labour hold		Swing		
Liberal Democrats hold		Swing		
Labour gain from Liberal Democrats		Swing		

Neville and Simasture (3)
Party	Candidate	Votes	%	±%
Independent	Bill Blenkinsopp	768		
Independent	Alan Warburton	575		
Labour	Sarah Iveson	560		
Labour	John Moran	535		
Independent	Paul Ducker	482		
Labour	Chris Wheeler	411		
BNP	Barry Davies	194		
Turnout		3,530		
Independent gain from Labour		Swing		
Independent gain from Labour		Swing		
Labour hold		Swing		

New Trimdon and Trimdon Grange
Party	Candidate	Votes	%	±%
Labour	Lucy Hovvels	441	85.5	
BNP	Amanda Foster	75	14.5	
Conservative	Shirley Bowes	0	0	
Majority		366	71.0	
Turnout		516		
Labour hold		Swing		

Sedgefield (3)
Party	Candidate	Votes	%	±%
Independent	Jim Wayman	1,089		
Conservative	David Brown	1,017		
Labour	John Robinson	855		
Labour	Ian Sutherland	554		
Independent	Lynne Goddard	536		
Labour	Philip Draper	463		
UKIP	Allison Morag	247		
BNP	Mark Colledge	147		
Turnout		4,908		
Independent hold		Swing		
Conservative hold		Swing		
Labour hold		Swing		

Ferryhill (3)
Party	Candidate	Votes	%	±%
Independent	Paul Gittins	820		
Independent	Terry Hogan	634		
Independent	Brian Haigh	613		
Labour	Bob Fleming	611		
Labour	Malcolm Iveson	549		
Labour	Angela Fleming	535		
Turnout		3,762		
Independent gain from Labour		Swing		
Independent gain from Labour		Swing		
Independent gain from Labour		Swing		

Spennymoor (3)
Party	Candidate	Votes	%	±%
Liberal Democrats	Ben Ord	884		
Liberal Democrats	Liz Maddison	747		
Liberal Democrats	Elizabeth Wood	624		
BNP	Mark Walker	513		
Labour	Eddie Plews	502		
Labour	Frederick Ryder	483		
Labour	Kester Noble	426		
Turnout		4,179		
Liberal Democrats hold		Swing		
Liberal Democrats hold		Swing		
Liberal Democrats hold		Swing		

Sunnydale (2)
Party	Candidate	Votes	%	±%
Labour	Vernon Chapman	406		
Independent	Ina Jackson Smith	404		
Labour	Allan Walker	382		
Independent	Lorraine Smith	342		
Liberal Democrats	Brian Burn	178		
Liberal Democrats	Len Cockfield	167		
BNP	James MacPherson	92		
Independent	Michael Stott	75		
Turnout		2,046		
Labour gain from Independent		Swing		
Independent hold		Swing		

Thickley (2)
Party	Candidate	Votes	%	±%
Independent	David Hancock	464		
Labour	Brian Stephens	446		
Labour	Peter Quinn	382		
Independent	John Smith	285		
Independent	Jean Bird	201		
Liberal Democrats	Patricia Horner	79		
BNP	Andrea Whelpdale	50		
Liberal Democrats	Janine Mawson	34		
Turnout		1,919		
Independent hold		Swing		
Labour gain from Independent		Swing		

Tudhoe (2)
Party	Candidate	Votes	%	±%
Labour	Agnes Armstrong	588		
Labour	Barbara Graham	577		
Conservative	Matthew Miller	352		
BNP	Jacqueline Walker	325		
Turnout		1,842		
Labour hold		Swing		
Labour hold		Swing		

West (3)
Party	Candidate	Votes	%	±%
Independent	Enid Paylor	720		
Independent	Helen Hutchinson	662		
Labour	George Gray	631		
Independent	Bill Curtis	627		
Labour	Maud Gray	566		
Labour	Alfred Tomlin	502		
Turnout		3,708		
Independent gain from Labour		Swing		
Independent hold		Swing		
Labour hold		Swing		

Woodham (3)
Party	Candidate	Votes	%	±%
Independent	Sandra Haigh	596		
Labour	Joan Gray	477		
Independent	Lileen Cuthberson	459		
Independent	Michael Hutchinson	449		
Conservative	Melanie Varley	420		
Labour	Keith Henderson	402		
Labour	Barbara Clare	401		
Turnout		3,204		
Independent gain from Labour		Swing		
Independent gain from Labour		Swing		
Labour hold		Swing		
