= Adorama =

Electronics and film equipment retailer

Coordinates: 40.739347°N 73.994059°W

Adorama Camera, Inc.
- Type: Private
- Industry: Retail
- Founded: 1974; 52 years ago
- Founder: Mendel Mendlowits
- Headquarters: New York City, New York, U.S.
- Key people: Eugene Mendlowits (Chairman/Owner)
- Products: Video, audio, lighting, electronics, computers, gaming, drones, and optics.
- Website: www.adorama.com

Adorama Camera, Inc is an American camera, electronics, and film equipment retailer launched in 1974. Apart from their online shopping websites (Adorama, Sunny Sports, Scuba.com, PRINTIQUE) They have a large store in Chelsea on the first floor of the building., which is located at 42 West, 18th Street, New York City, New York.

== Overview and History ==
Adorama was founded in 1974 by Mendel Mendlowits, a Holocaust survivor. The company began as a retail store for cameras and photographic equipment. In 1988, it relocated to its current location on 18th Street in Manhattan where it had opened the Adorama Rental Company (ARC) in 1982. In 1997, Adorama registered adorama.com, for its e-commerce website, and introduced a photo printing service called AdoramaPix, which was rebranded as Printique in 2019.

The company has expanded its operations over time, including the establishment of a photo lab, equipment rental services, and educational workshops through the Adorama Learning Center. In 2005, it opened a warehouse in New Jersey to increase inventory capacity. ARC later expanded with a Brooklyn location in 2017, and that same year the company introduced Adorama Business Solutions.

As of 2021, the company also operates warehouses in Chattanooga, Tennessee, and Salt Lake City, Utah.

== Companies and associations ==
=== Adorama Rental Co. ===
The company's brand of rental services, Adorama Rental Co., was founded in 1988. It had multiple departments dedicated to renting out a wide range of equipment, from TV production, studio, and cinematography equipment to cameras. Short-term rentals were allowed and customers could have the items picked up or delivered nationwide.

The store also established a Used Equipment Department where customers can purchase used merchandise or trade in their old equipment in exchange for cash or credit.

=== AdoramaPix ===
In 1997, Adorama launched a photo printing and Flash-based photo book service via its sister website AdoramaPix, which allows users to create and customize their own hardcover photo book online for home delivery.

By 2014, AdoramaPix had expanded their operations by moving to a larger in-house photo lab—a more than 20,000-square-foot (1,900 m^{2}) photo production and printing facility in Brooklyn, New York. According to the Director of AdoramaPix, Herman Klein, the move to the bigger production house enabled "AdoramaPix to multiply our production capacity" and add "new features and services, including more options for custom cover books and same-day shipping."

=== Printique ===
In 2014, the operation moved to a company-owned photo lab in Brooklyn, New York, measuring over 20,000 square feet (1,900 m²). Reports at the time noted that the move expanded production capacity and added products such as custom-cover books. The change also introduced a same-day shipping option for certain orders.

=== Adorama Business Solutions ===
In 2017, the company launched its business-to-business division, Adorama Business Solutions (ABS). The organization offers a range of commercial services such as consultations, procurement assistance, and technical and support services from pre-sale through post-sale for studios, broadcasters, networks, and educational and government institutions.

== Television ==
During the COVID-19 pandemic in 2020, Adorama launched the Create No Matter What campaign. The initiative included video tutorials, equipment recommendations, and monthly creative challenges in photography, video, and audio. The campaign continued into 2021.

Picture America, a series by AdoramaTV, profiled photographer and commercial fisherman Corey Arnold in an episode. Based in the Columbia River Gorge in Washington State, Arnold discussed his career in photography and fishing, including his photography project Aleutian Dreams, which documents life aboard commercial fishing vessels in Alaska. His work has appeared in National Geographic and addresses themes of sustainability and the environment.

Adorama released a short film titled New York Rhapsody, which depicts various New York-based artists and creative professionals.
