= Josep Guijarro =

Spanish writer, ufologist and journalist

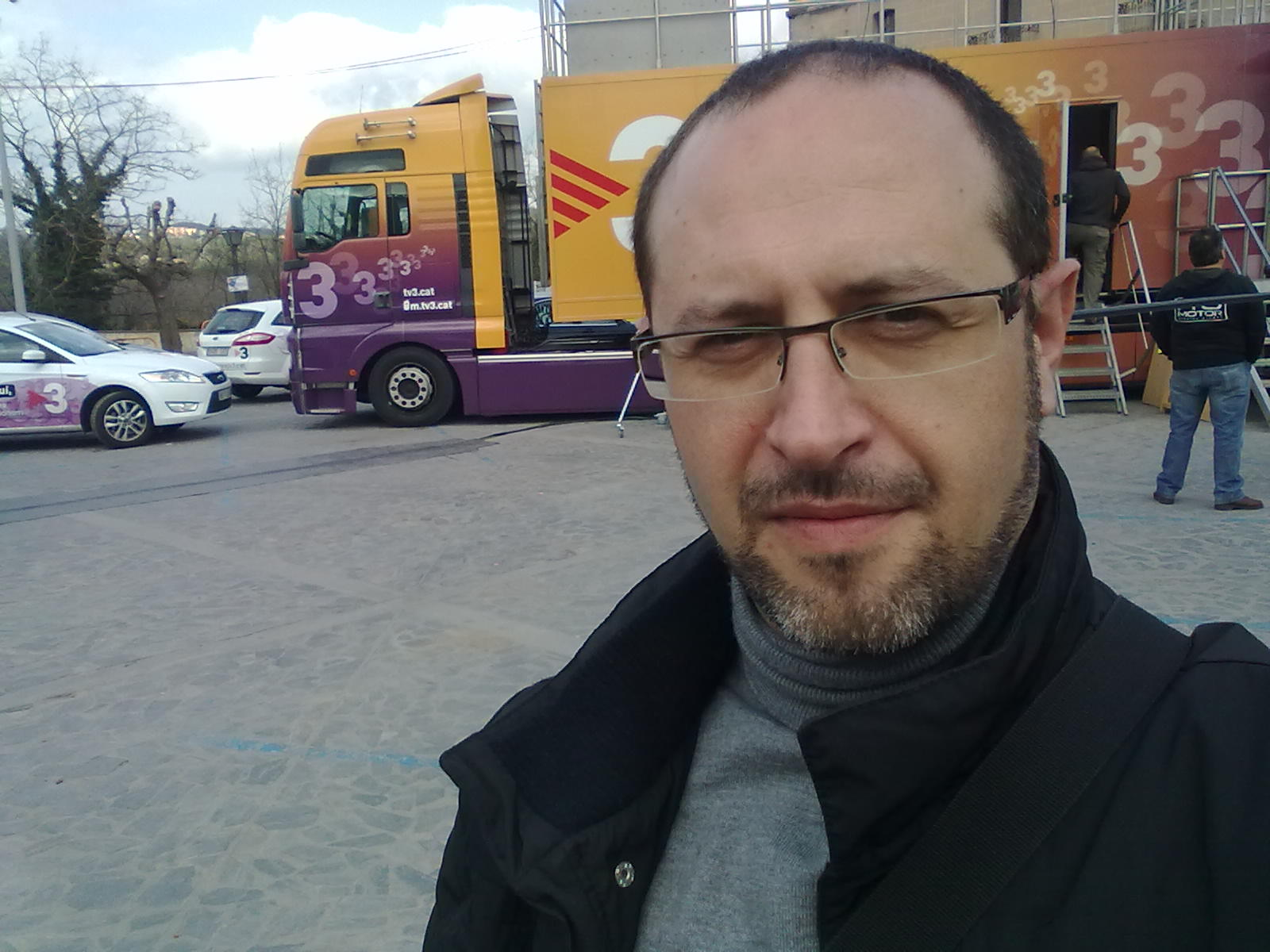
Portrait of Josep Guijarro

Josep Guijarro Triadó (Terrassa, 1967) is a Spanish writer, ufologist and journalist. In 2006, he was the director and conductor of the programme Enigmes i Misteris Radio Nacional de España.

== Biography ==
He hosted the program "Enigmes i Misteris" on RNE 4, dedicated to mysteries. He has been the chief editor of the magazine "Más Allá" and the director of the now-defunct magazine "Karma 7". He also directed the travel magazine "Rutas del Mundo". He collaborates with the radio program "La Rosa de los Vientos" on Onda Cero, where he has a section called "Los 32 Rumbos" with a corresponding website called "Los 32 Rumbos" on the Internet. Known for his ufological research, he has written several books and in 2013 worked as a documentary filmmaker on a series about aliens on Canal de Historia. Currently, he is the director of the travel, archaeology, and historical enigmas magazine "Planeta desconocido".

== Works ==
- Infiltrados, seres de otras dimensiones entre nosotros (Sangrilá, 1994), ISBN 84-604-9144-7
- Guía de la Cataluña mágica (Martínez Roca, 1999), ISBN 84-270-2455-X
- El tesoro oculto de los templarios (Martínez Roca, 2001) ISBN 84-270-2700-1
- Gótica (Aguilar, 2005) ISBN 84-03-09621-6
- Rex Mundi (Aguilar, 2006) ISBN 84-03-09704-2
- In-Creíble (Libros Cúpula, 2013) ISBN 978-84-480-0816-1
- Guia fantàstica de Catalunya (Angle Editorial, 2013) ISBN 978-84-15695-40-0
- Coincidencias Imposibles (Libros Cúpula, 2014) ISBN 978-84-480-2036-1
