= Brian Stevens (cricketer) =

English cricketer

Personal information
- Full name: Keith Brian Havelock Stevens
- Born: 22 August 1942 (age 84); Bombay, Bombay State, British India
- Batting: Right-handed

Domestic team information
- Years: Team
- 1962: Oxford University
- 1960–1962: Berkshire

Career statistics
Competition	First-class
Matches	5
Runs scored	102
Batting average	10.20
100s/50s	0/1
Top score	52
Catches/stumpings	4/–
- Source: Cricinfo, 22 November 2011

Keith Brian Havelock Stevens (born 22 August 1942) is an English former cricketer. Stevens was a right-handed batsman.

Stevens was born at Bombay in British India and was educated in England at Bradfield College and Worcester College, Oxford.

Stevens made his debut for Berkshire in the 1960 Minor Counties Championship against Devon. He played Minor counties cricket for Berkshire from 1960 to 1962, making ten appearances. While studying at the University of Oxford, Stevens made his first-class debut for Oxford University Cricket Club against Gloucestershire in 1962. He made four further first-class appearances for the university that season, the last of which came against Middlesex. In his five first-class appearances, he scored 102 runs at an average of 10.20, with a high score of 52, which came against Lancashire.
