= Tower Hamlets Local History Library and Archives =

Public library in Tower Hamlets, London

Coordinates: 51°31′25.59″N 0°2′32.76″W

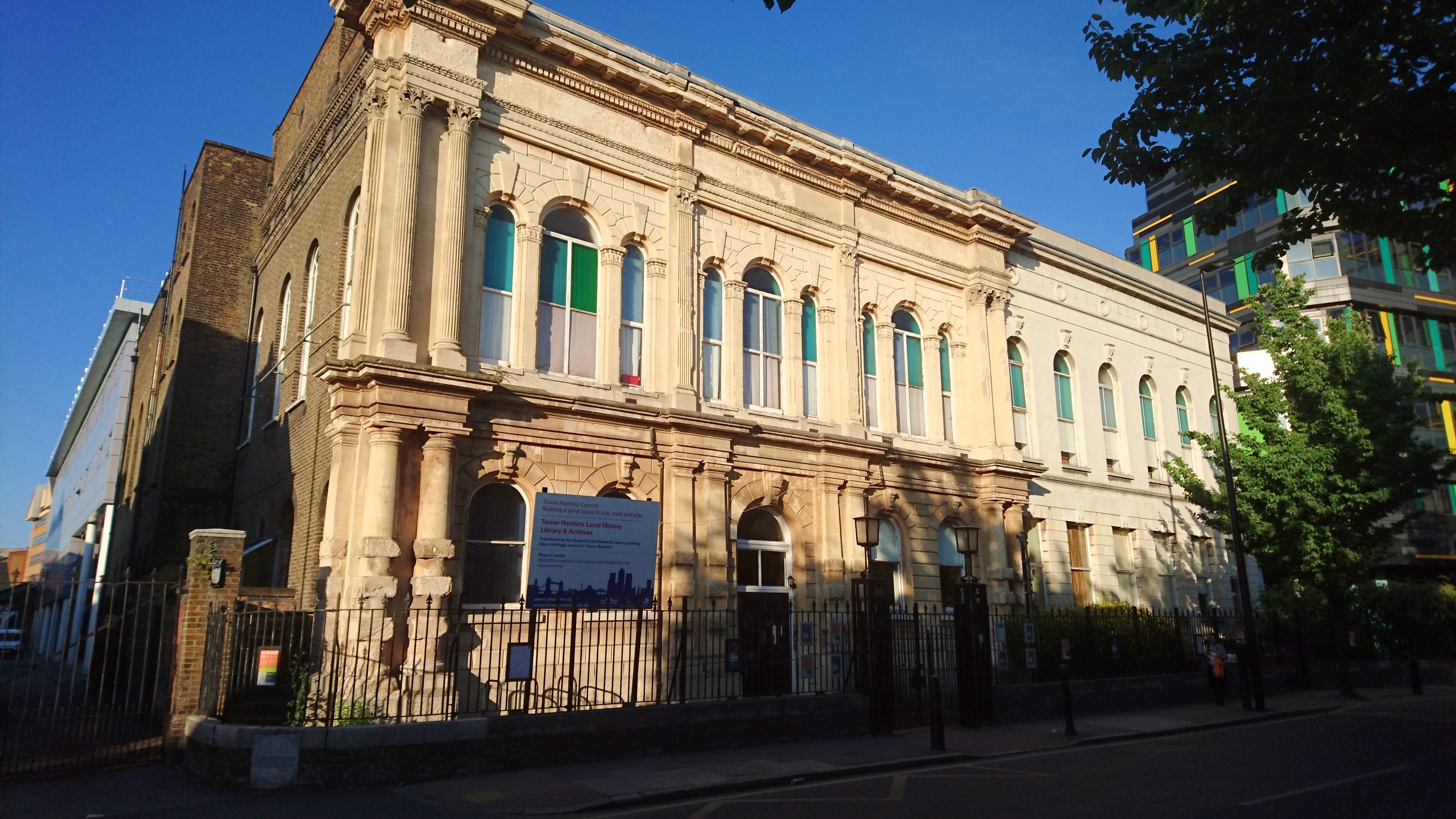
Tower Hamlets Local History Library and Archives, on a summer's evening 2018

Tower Hamlets Local History Library and Archives is a facility provided by the London Borough of Tower Hamlets to enable members of the public to consult books and records in their collection. It is located at Bancroft Road Library.

The facility is located in a building which was formerly the Mile End Old Town Vestry Hall built in 1861. The building was converted into a library in 1902, then adapted with an extension in 1906 with money from Andrew Carnegie.

== Threat of closure in 2008 ==
The lending library vacated the building in 2005 with the opening of the first Idea Store in Whitechapel. In 2008 the Library and Archives were then under threat from a proposal to close the library. A community campaign was started to save the library with a meeting held on 27 September 2008 to urge Councillors not to proceed with the plans. This was addressed by Stan Newens (local historian and former MEP), Bernard Kops and Jerry White. The campaign was ultimately successful.
