= The Maltings Theatre & Cinema =

The Maltings
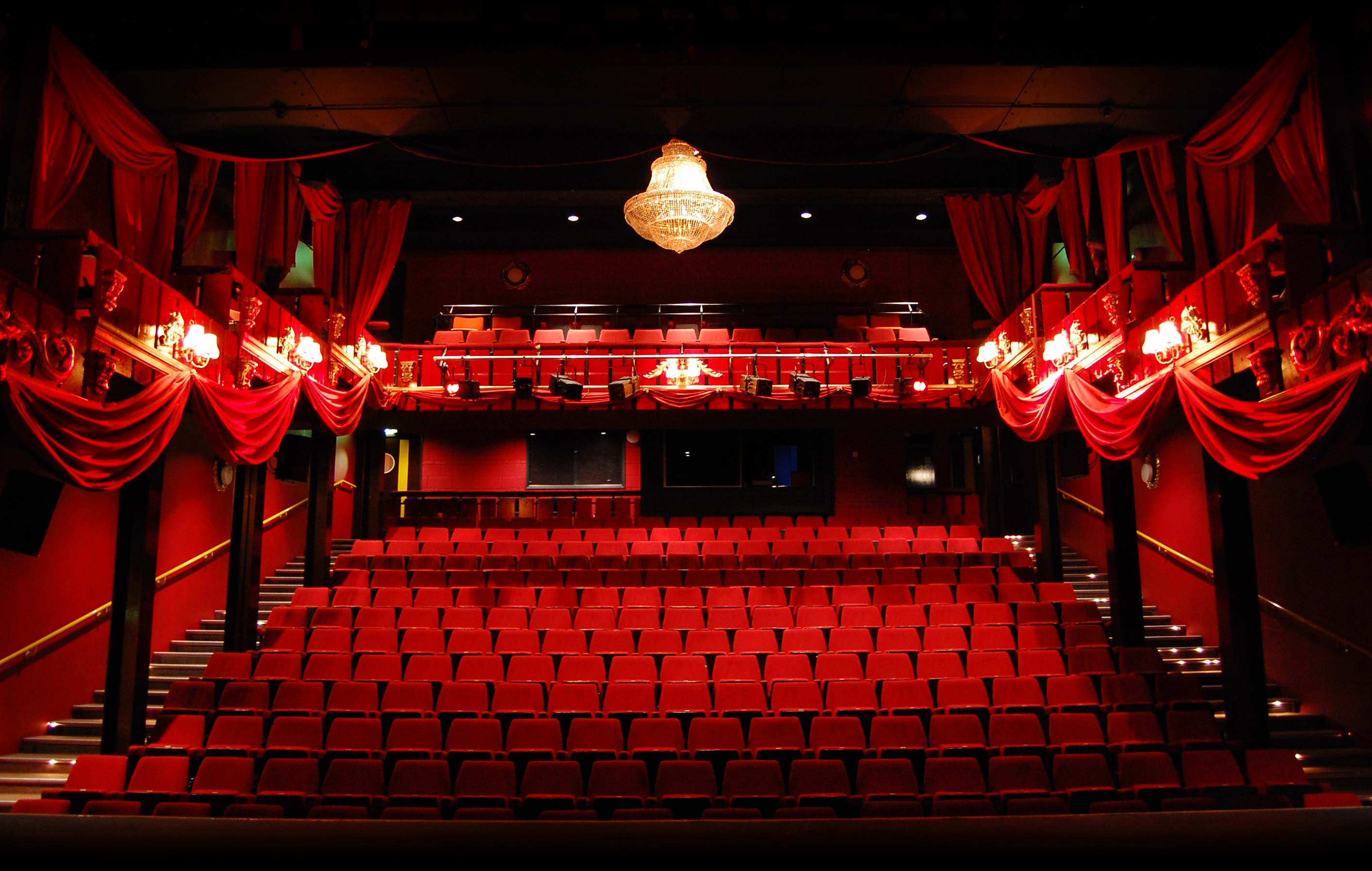
- The Main House Theatre.
- Interactive map of The Maltings
- Address: Eastern Lane; Berwick-upon-Tweed, Northumberland; England
- Coordinates: 55.76863°N 2.0042°W
- Owner: The Maltings (Berwick) Trust, leased from Northumberland County Council
- Capacity: Main House: 314 (2 levels) / Studio: 74 (Retractable Seating)
- Type: Main House: Proscenium / Studio: Black Box
- Production: Presenting & Co-producing

Construction
- Opened: 1990
- Years active: >30 years
- Architects: Law & Dunbar-Nasmith

Website
- www.maltingsberwick.co.uk

The Maltings is a cinema and live arts venue located in Berwick-upon-Tweed, Northumberland, England.

== Details ==
The venue is run by a charitable trust -The Maltings (Berwick) Trust - which also manages Maltings Visual Arts and its exhibition and residency programme across the Granary and the Gymnasium Galleries, located elsewhere in the town centre.

It is mostly funded through ticket sales, event promotions, and its other trading activities, but also receives annual funding from both Northumberland County Council and Arts Council England.

The venue contains the Main House Theatre, the Henry Travers Studio Theatre, Theatre Bar and Café Bar, workshop spaces and offices, including the main office of the Berwick Film and Media Arts Festival

The Main House Theatre seats up to 314. Over 550 events are presented each year: mid-scale touring theatre/opera/dance, The Maltings' own pantomime each December, local community productions, music concerts, and cinema including movies and live broadcasts of theatre, opera and ballet.

The Henry Travers Studio, named after local actor Henry Travers, is a black-box studio space used for live performances, recitals, workshops, rehearsals, conferencing, and film screenings. It can seat between 60 and 120.

== History ==
The Maltings' Eastern Lance venue was opened on 4 April 1990 by Peter Palumbo, then Chairman of Arts Council England, as a purpose-built arts centre built in the ruins of an early 19th-century Maltings (destroyed by fire in 1984) after a public campaign to establish a permanent professional arts centre in the town. The venue was designed by architects Law & Dunbar-Nasmith, and stands on a hillside in the centre of Berwick-upon-Tweed with views across the 17th century Berwick Bridge and the River Tweed estuary.
