= National Barrier Asset =

The National Barrier Asset is a modular fence system established in 2004 by the British government to provide UK police forces with a capability to deploy temporary specialist protective security barriers to protect high profile locations or temporary events, such as political party conferences, from vehicle borne suicide attacks.

The fence is about 9 feet (2.7 m) high. It is designed to meet the British government's PAS 68 specifications and therefore is able to withstand an impact from a 7.5-tonne vehicle travelling at 50 miles per hour (80 km/h). It is managed and stored in an undisclosed location on behalf of the Home Office by Sussex Police, and is capable of being deployed in central London within three to four hours.

In 2008 the size of the National Barrier Asset was tripled to meet expected demands. It came to prominence for the 2014 NATO Summit, when it was erected around the Celtic Manor in Newport and in parts of Cardiff. In June 2015 it was announced that around 2 miles (4 kilometres) of the asset would be sent to Calais to help prevent illegal immigration to the United Kingdom. In 2017, Police Scotland deployed the asset in Edinburgh ahead of the Fringe festival. The assets have also been deployed regularly in various UK cities as a protective measure at European style Christmas markets, and was deployed in Liverpool to protect publicly accessible locations during the city's hosting of the Eurovision Song Contest
