= Work of William Burges at Cardiff Castle =

Reconstruction of Cardiff Castle, Wales

Cardiff Castle
- Castle Quarter, Cardiff, Wales
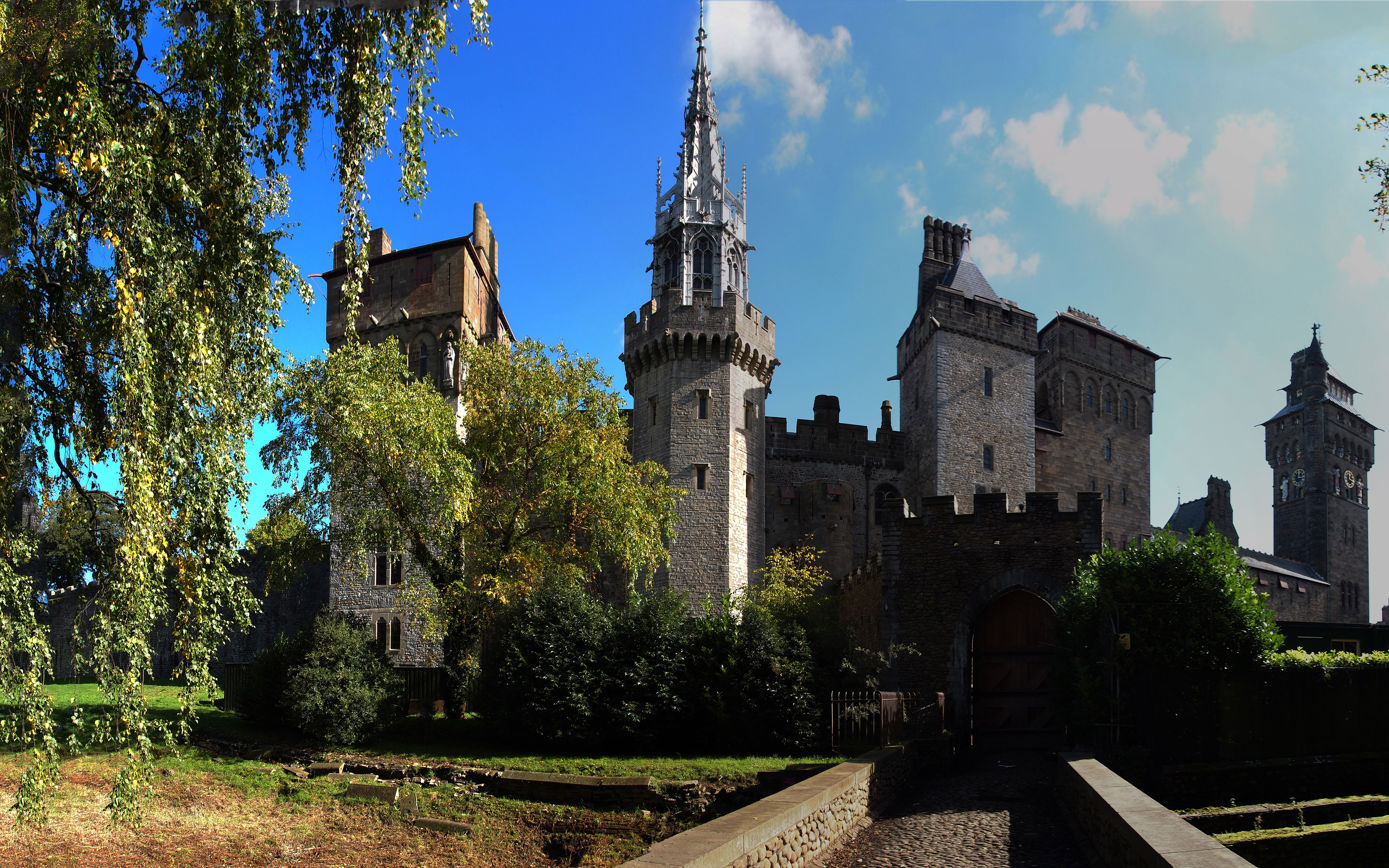
- "The symbol of a whole nation"

Site information
- Owner: Cardiff Council
- Open to the public: Yes

Location
- Cardiff Castle shown within Cardiff
- Coordinates: 51.4824°N 3.1811°W
- Grid reference: grid reference ST179766

Site history
- Built: Late 11th century; current appearance the result of Victorian era renovations
- In use: Tourist attraction

Listed Building – Grade I
- Designated: 12 February 1952

From 1865 until his death in 1881 the Victorian architect William Burges undertook the reconstruction of Cardiff Castle for his patron, John Crichton-Stuart, 3rd Marquess of Bute. The rebuilding saw the creation of some of the most significant Victorian interiors in Britain.

== The castle before the 18th century ==
The origins of the castle at castle are Roman, of the 1st century A.D. and the site has been in continual occupation since. In the Middle Ages the castle was an important fortified site but by the 18th century, when it came into the possession of the Marquesses of Bute it had declined in importance.

== The 18th century castle ==
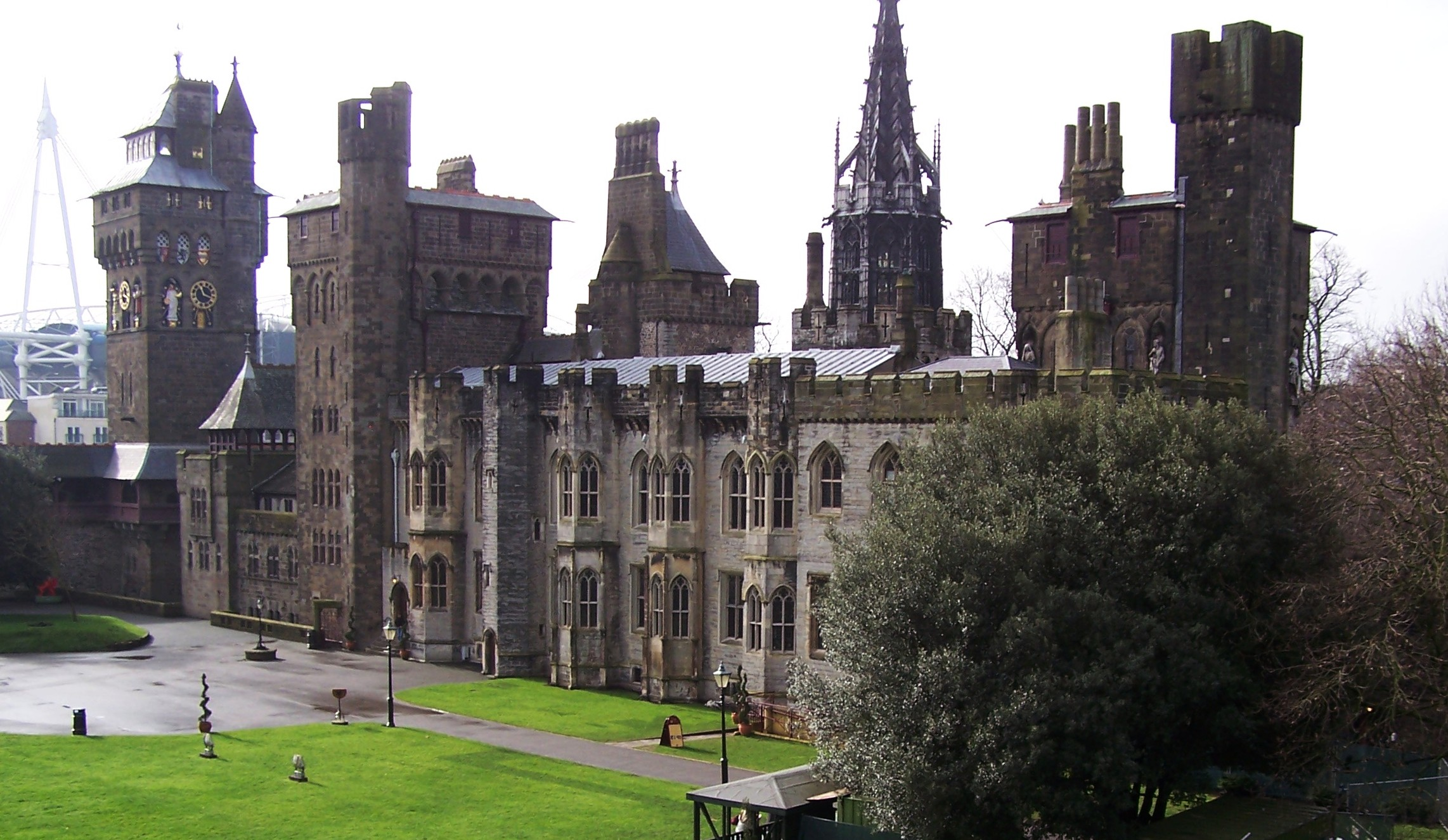
Burges's enfilade of towers engulfs Holland's Georgian Gothick range

In the mid-18th century, an extensive plan for reconstruction of the castle was prepared by Robert Adam for John Stuart, 1st Marquess of Bute, but nothing of this scheme was carried out. In 1776 Capability Brown and his son-in-law Henry Holland were employed to develop the castle as a seat appropriate for the Marquess's son. Brown landscaped the central court, filling in the moat surrounding the keep as he went, while Holland converted the West range into "habitable living quarters". Holland's extensions, dating from 1776, were carried out in a "tame Gothic fashion". The connoisseur Sir Richard Colt Hoare decried the result as "so thickly beset with sash windows that little of its ancient character can be perceived". Holland and Brown's work ceased on the death of Lord Mount Stuart in 1794. In the early 19th century, Robert Smirke was consulted on improvements but again nothing was taken forward. On his inheritance, John Crichton-Stuart, 3rd Marquess of Bute came into possession of a castle that was " a semi-reconstructed ruin" of which he wrote, "I am painfully alive to the fact that the castle is very far indeed from setting anything like an example in art".

== Victorian construction and reconstruction: Burges and Bute ==
In 1865, Bute met William Burges. This may have resulted from Burges's father, Alfred Burges, having worked for Bute's father on the East Bute Docks in Cardiff. Together, their joint interests in the medieval world, supported by Bute's money and Burges's skill, transformed the castle into a "Gothic feudal extravaganza". In plan, the new building broadly follows the arrangement of a standard Victorian country house. The 150-foot (46 m) high Clock Tower forms a suite of bachelor's rooms. To the north, the Guest Tower contains accommodation for visitors. The main block comprises the principal reception rooms, the library and the banqueting hall. The Herbert Tower houses the Arab Room, on which Burges was working when he fell ill and died in 1881. The Beauchamp Tower, crowned with a flèche, holds an oratory, built on the spot where Bute's father died. The Bute Tower held family bedrooms. The interiors of the castle are unique; as significant was its role as a training ground for British arts and crafts. Led by Burges, who took overall responsibility for every aspect of his interiors, developments in the manufacture of stained glass, in carving in wood and stone, in tiling, metalwork, textiles design and painting at the castle, saw a generation of craftsmen grow up "in the Burgesian mould".

=== Clock Tower ===
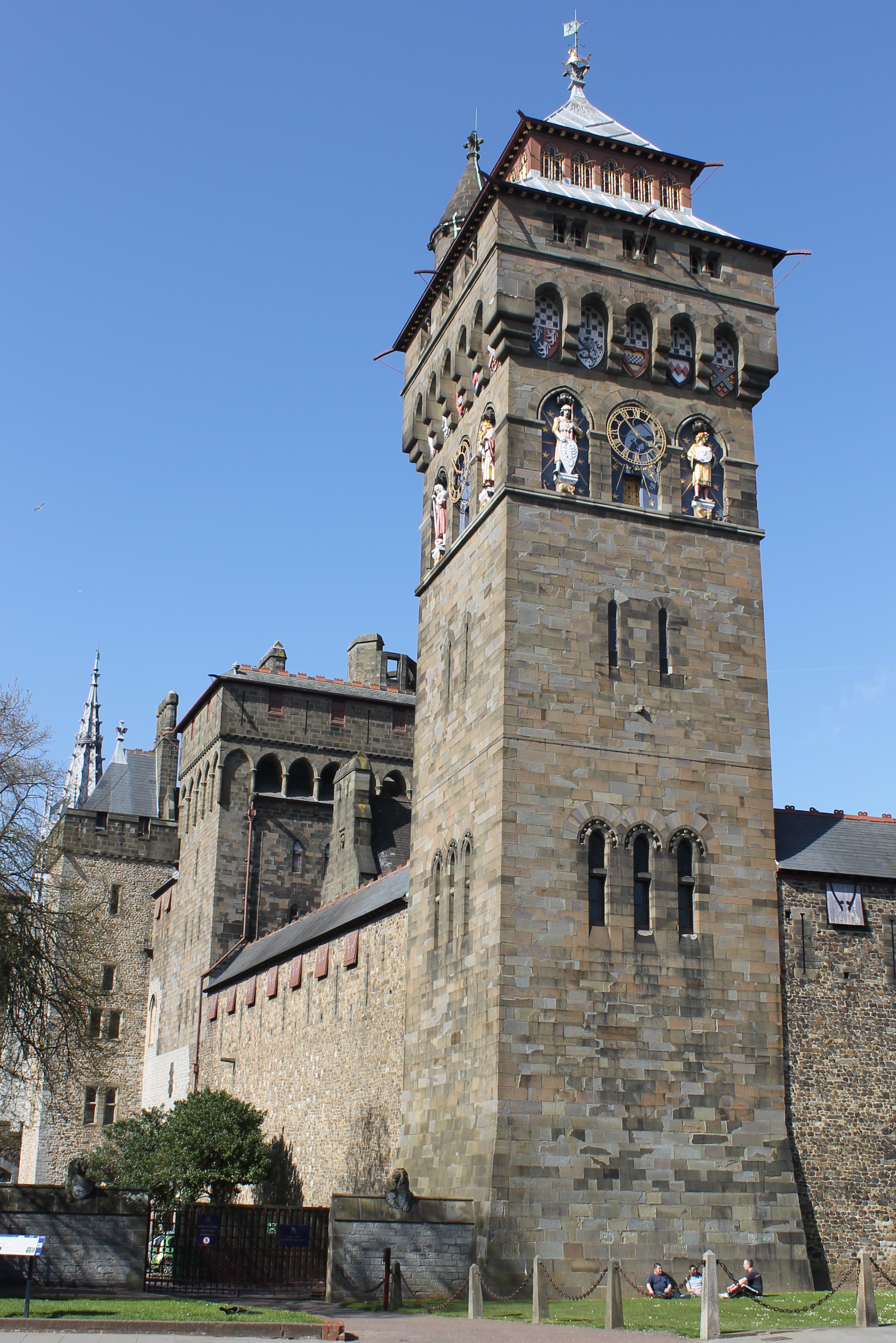
The Clock Tower

The Clock Tower was Burges's first contribution to the castle; conceived in 1866, and planned by 1868, it was built between 1869 and 1873. The design draws on Burges's failed entry for the Royal Courts of Justice. Originally designed as a suite of bachelor rooms, the tower comprises six or seven storeys; a gardener's room cum-storeroom on the ground floor, the Winter smoking room, entered from the wall walk, Bute's Bachelor bedroom, a servant's room with clock mechanism room above that, and finally the double-height Summer smoking room. The curtain wall which connects the tower with the Black Tower was heightened by Burges, the battlements being given timber covers and a bretache. This defensive feature, which can be seen in early photographs, was subsequently removed. Internally, the rooms were sumptuously decorated with gildings, carvings and cartoons, many allegorical in style, depicting the seasons, myths and fables. The overarching decorative theme is Time. In his A History of The Gothic Revival, written as the tower was being built, Charles Locke Eastlake wrote of Burges's "peculiar talents (and) luxuriant fancy." The tower was complete by September 1873.

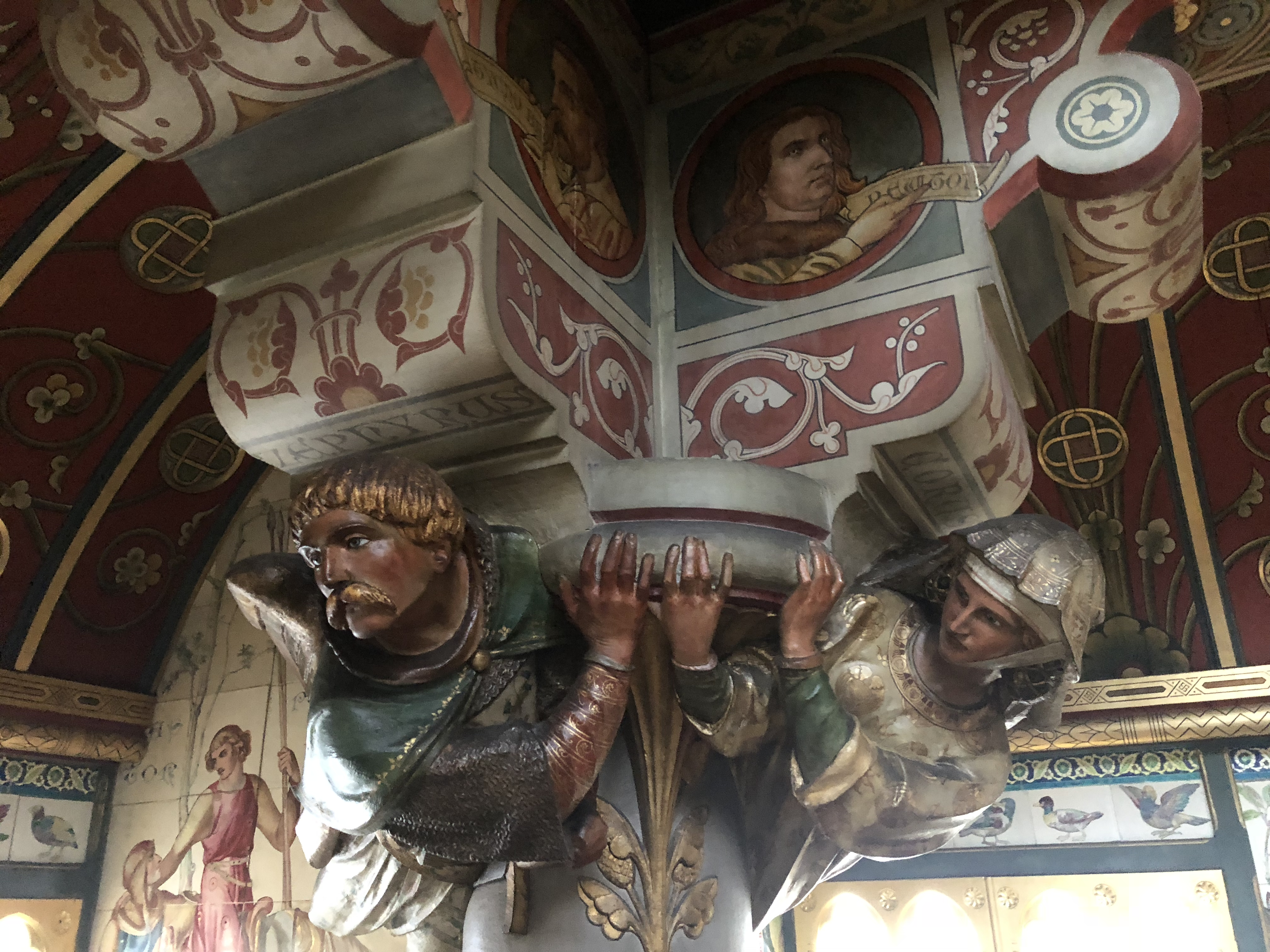
A corbel in the Summer Smoking Room – the tulip vase sat on the small platform in the middle

Burges planned the tower to be "a handsome object at the present entrance to the town". It gives a strong vertical accent to the south-west corner of the site. Constructed of Forest of Dean ashlar stone, the tower rises to the clock stage. The faces of the clocks are decorated with carvings representing the planets, by Thomas Nicholls. The statues were re-painted and re-gilded in a four-year restoration project begun in 2004. The interiors of the tower focus on a single theme, Time. In the Winter smoking room, stained glass windows, designed by Frederick Weekes and made by Saunders & Co., depict the Norse days of the week. The wall murals depict the seasons and the sculptured corbels show the times of the day. The theme of the Bachelor bedroom is mineral wealth, a none-too subtle nod to the source of the fortune that paid for the castle's redevelopment, and astrology and alchemy. It has an early en-suite bathroom, with a sunken bath carved from Italian marble. The Summer smoking room sits at the top of the structure and is two storeys high with an internal balcony that, through an unbroken band of windows, gives views of the Cardiff Docks, the Bristol Channel, and the Glamorganshire countryside. Girouard describes it as "perhaps the strangest and most wonderful of all Victorian rooms". The floor has a map of the world in mosaic. The sculpture was created by Thomas Nicholls. The tiling used throughout the tower is "particularly striking". As with stained glass, Burges led a revival in the manufacture of encaustic tiles; working with George Maw and William Godwin, he pioneered techniques in the area which sought to replicate medieval precedents. Then, as now, Burges's designs could bewilder critics; the contemporary reviewer in The Building News confessed; "the portentous corbellings are of a character of design which we honestly allow we fail to comprehend".

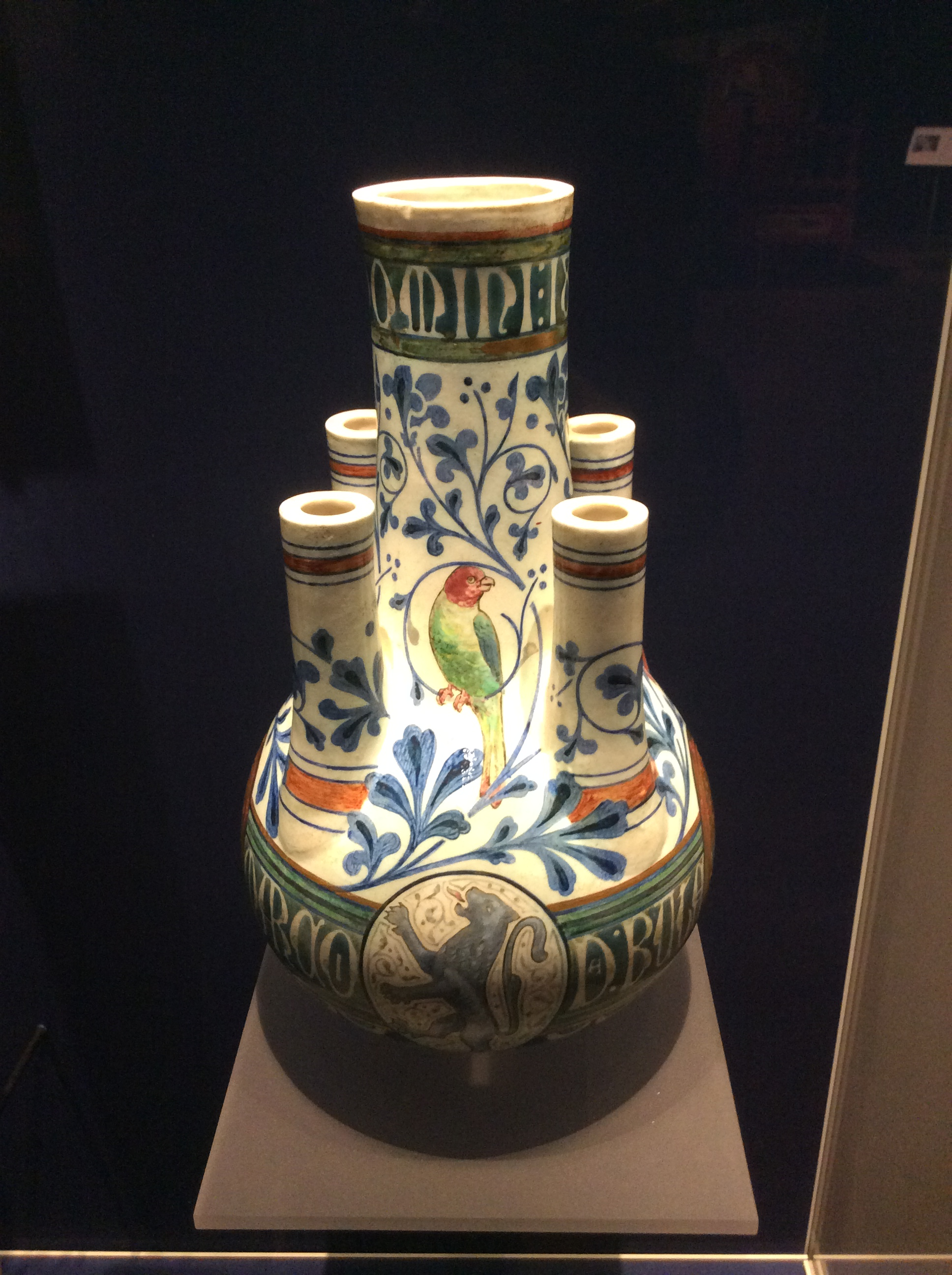
One of the four tulip vases designed by Burges for the Summer smoking room

Much of the furniture and furnishings made for the castle were removed in 1947; Cardiff City Council continues to work for their return where possible. An example is the tulip vase purchased by Amgueddfa Cymru – Museum Wales in 2016. Burges designed four such vases to sit on the corner corbels in the Summer smoking room – they are highly architectural in design, being modelled on the Abbot's Kitchen at Marmoutier Abbey near Tours. Removed by the Butes in 1947 and subsequently sold, one is now held by the Victoria and Albert Museum, one by The Higgins Art Gallery & Museum, Bedford, and the third was bought by the National Museum. The fourth was acquired by National Museums Scotland in 2017, with a grant from the National Heritage Memorial Fund, after an export bar was placed on the item in June 2016. Other examples of returned furniture include an ebonised side table designed for the Summer Smoking Room and acquired in 2007 and a glazed fire screen designed for the same room and acquired in 2012.

=== Guest Tower ===
The Guest Tower, lying beyond the Tank Tower, is entirely Burges, replacing Henry Holland's new wing. Of seven storeys, with an octagonal stair turret, its double height, arcaded, top storey echoes the design for the Bishop's Palace at St Davids. The tower contains the site of the original kitchen at its base and above, the nursery, decorated with painted tiles depicting Aesop's Fables, and characters from nursery rhymes and children's tales including Ali Baba, Robinson Crusoe and The Invisible Prince, depicted as an empty silhouette between two trees. The Walnut room above that has a fireplace carved with images from the story of Jack and the Beanstalk. Much of the decoration of this tower was not completed until the early 20th century, long after Burges's death.

=== Herbert Tower ===
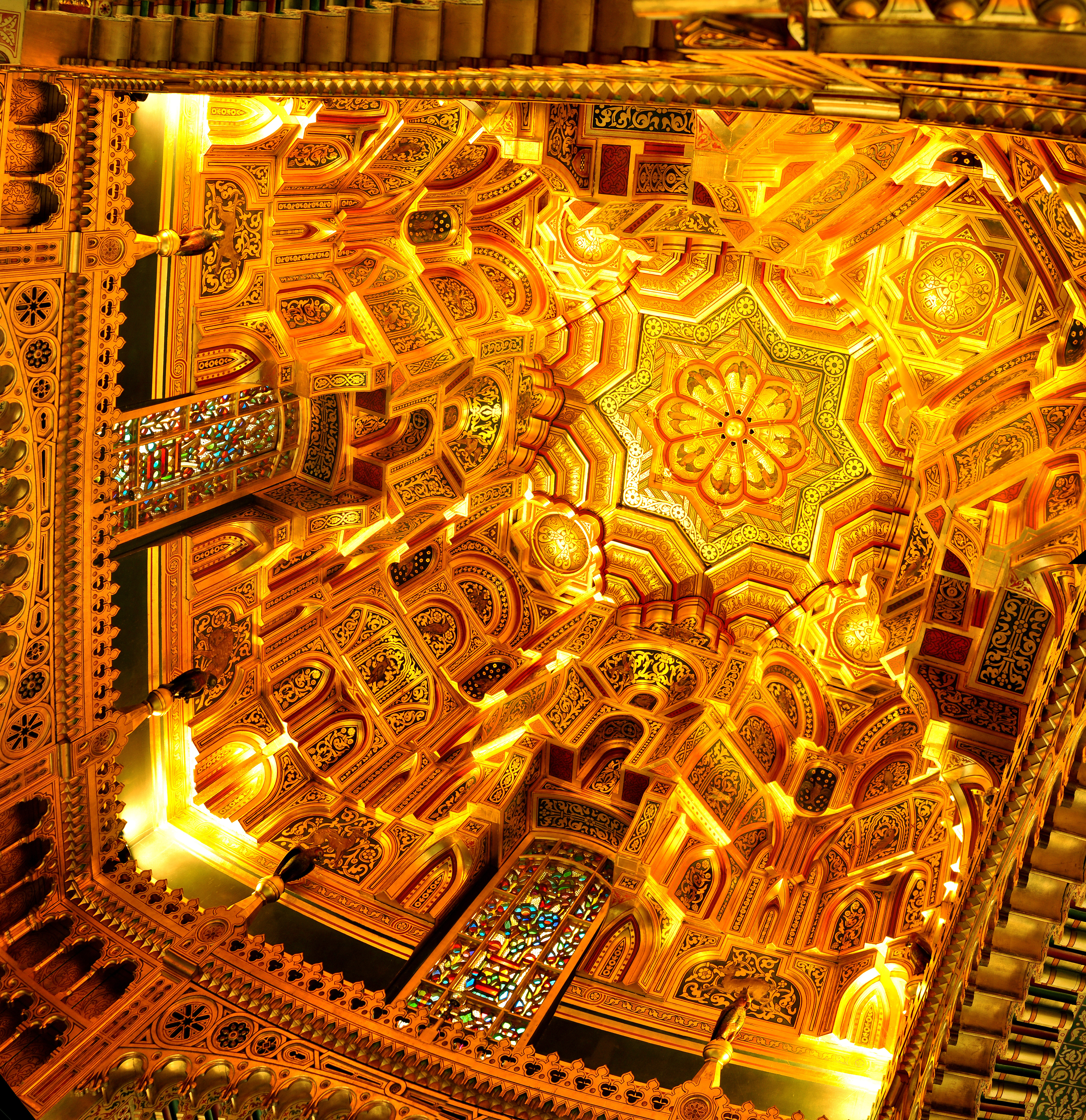
The Arab Room ceiling

The Herbert Tower is of brown rubble and is Holland's work up to the third storey. Above it, Burges added two further storeys and the battlemented roof. The tower contains two of Burges's "finest miniature interiors", Bute's study and the Arab room. The latter room is one of Burges's masterpieces, John Newman describing it as "the most exotic in the castle". Its jelly-mould ceiling in a Moorish style is drawn from Burges's studies of Islamic art in Spain and Sicily, and from a book on the architecture of Cairo published in 1877. John Grant, the architect employed at the castle by the fourth Marquess, and author of a history of the building published in 1923, incorrectly stated that "the decoration is based on an actual room in Arabia", as well as repeatedly misspelling Burges's surname. As usual, Burges led on every aspect of the room's design, including the stained glass, the marbled floor and walls, the gilded parrots on the cornice, the cedar wood wall cabinets inlaid with silver and the statuettes of Eastern deities. It was the last room on which he was working when he fell ill in 1881. After his death in April of that year, Bute placed Burges's initials, together with his own, and the date, in the fireplace of the Arab Room as a memorial. The room was completed by Burges's brother-in-law, Richard Popplewell Pullan. The room is almost exactly contemporaneous with the Arab Hall constructed by Frederick, Lord Leighton in his Holland Park house and illustrates the later Victorian obsession with the Orient.

=== Banqueting hall, library and grand staircase ===
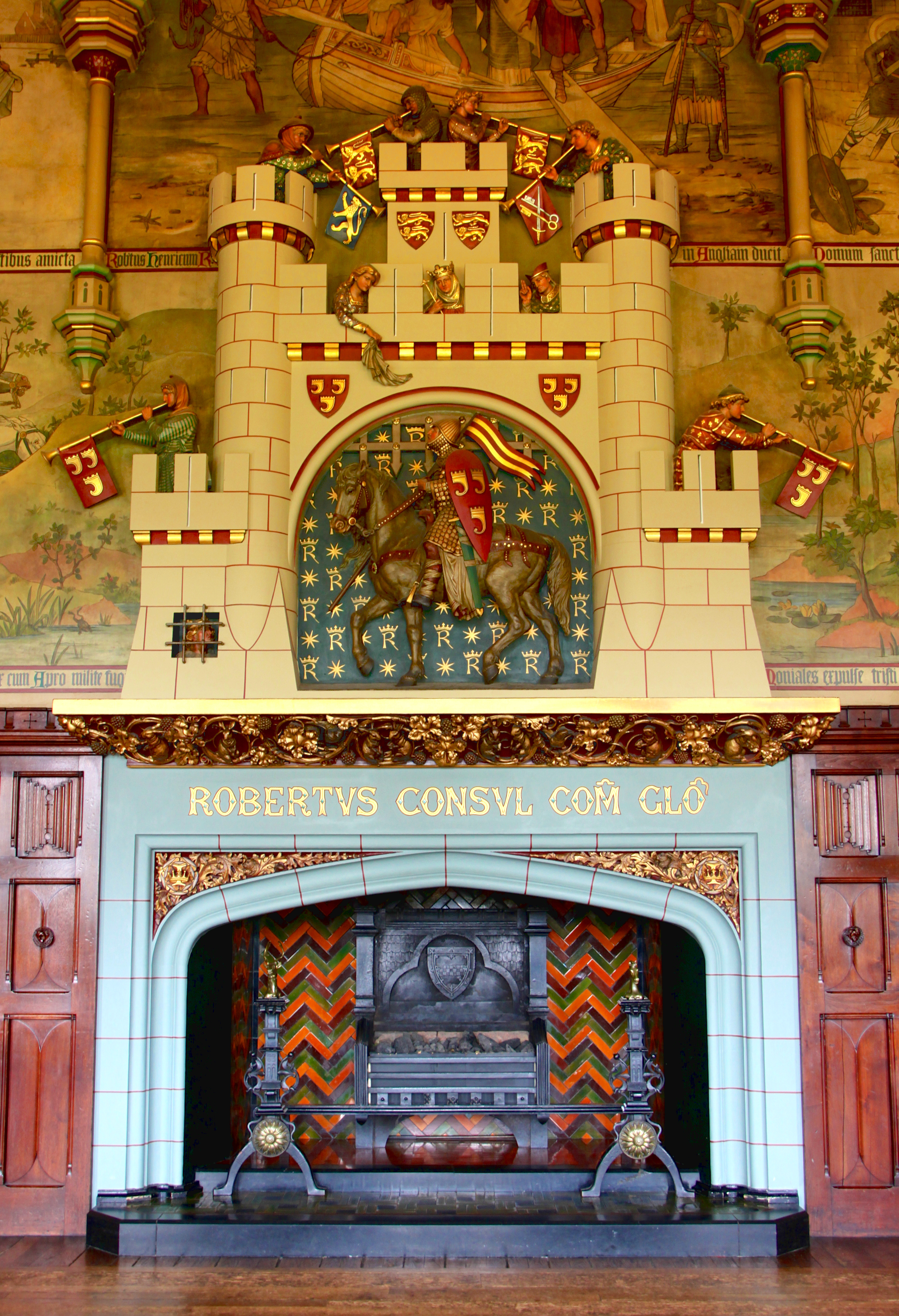
The Banqueting hall fireplace

The central part of the castle, the Beauchamp range, shows the extent of Holland's construction most clearly. The turrets visible from the courtyard are his work, except for the most southern, which was installed as part of the reconstruction of the grand staircase in 1927. The origins are late-medieval. The range comprises the library on the ground floor with the two-storey banqueting hall above it. Both rooms are enormous. The decoration of these rooms is less impressive than elsewhere in the castle, much of it being completed after Burges's death by Lonsdale, a painter “required to cover areas rather greater than his talents deserved”.

In the Banqueting hall, the murals depict scenes from the history of the county of Glamorgan. The exploits of Robert of Gloucester formed the basis of Bute's address to the Archaeological Institute when he addressed them as President in Cardiff in 1871. A huge fireplace has a mantle depicting the castle in Norman times. Robert, Earl of Gloucester is shown leaving the castle, with his wife waving him off and trumpeters on the battlements heralding his departure. The imprisoned Robert of Normandy looks on from a barred cell window. Burges drew inspiration for the room's hammerbeam roof from Framlingham Church and St Peters, Mancroft. The hall screen was designed by Frame in 1887.

A pair of double doors led from the hall to the grand staircase, recorded in a watercolour perspective prepared by Axel Haig. Long believed not to have been built, recent investigation has confirmed that it was constructed during Burges's time, but removed in its entirety in the 1930s, reputedly after the third Marchioness had "once slipped on its polished surface." The staircase was not universally praised in the contemporary press; the Building News writing that the design was "one of the least happy we have seen from Mr Burges's pencil...the contrasts of colour are more startling than pleasing."

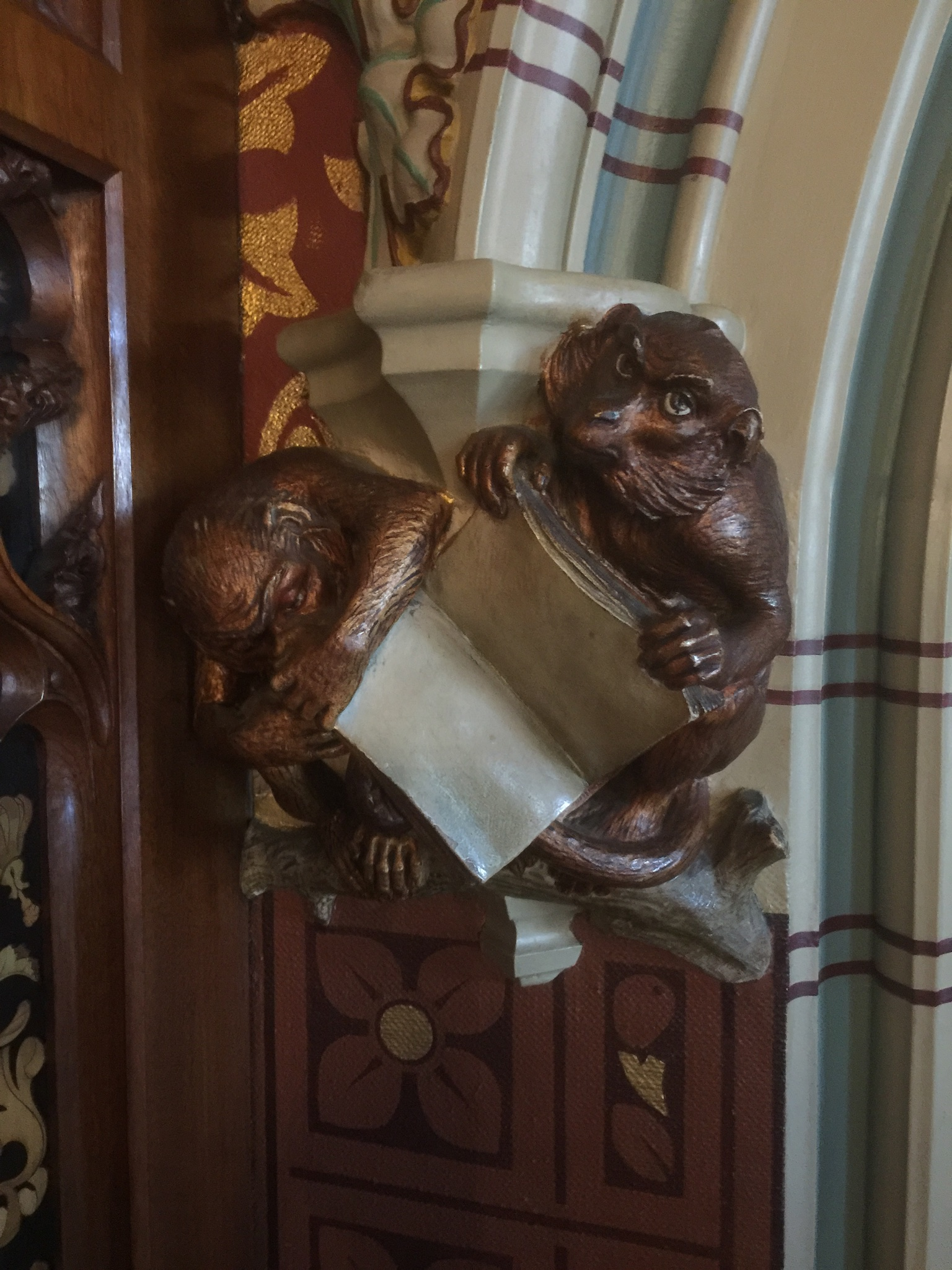
Monkeys argue over a book is Burges's comment on Charles Darwin

The library, under the Banqueting hall, is extremely large, "to encompass all the interests of its polymath owner". Construction began in 1873, and concluded just after Burges's death. The chimneypiece has carved figures referring to the purpose of the room and to the Marquess, a noted linguist. Four represent the ancient Greek, Assyrian, Hebrew and Egyptian alphabets while the fifth figure is believed to represent Bute himself, clad as a Celtic monk. Desks, constructed from walnut, incorporate early radiators, decorated with heraldic motifs. Carvings in the library, as elsewhere, illustrate Burges's sense of humour, as well as his alertness to contemporary controversy. Four monkeys cavorting around the Tree of Knowledge, one stealing an apple, two wrestling over the Book of Truth, and one poring over the book in puzzlement, are his comment on Charles Darwin's On the Origin of Species.

=== Beauchamp Tower ===
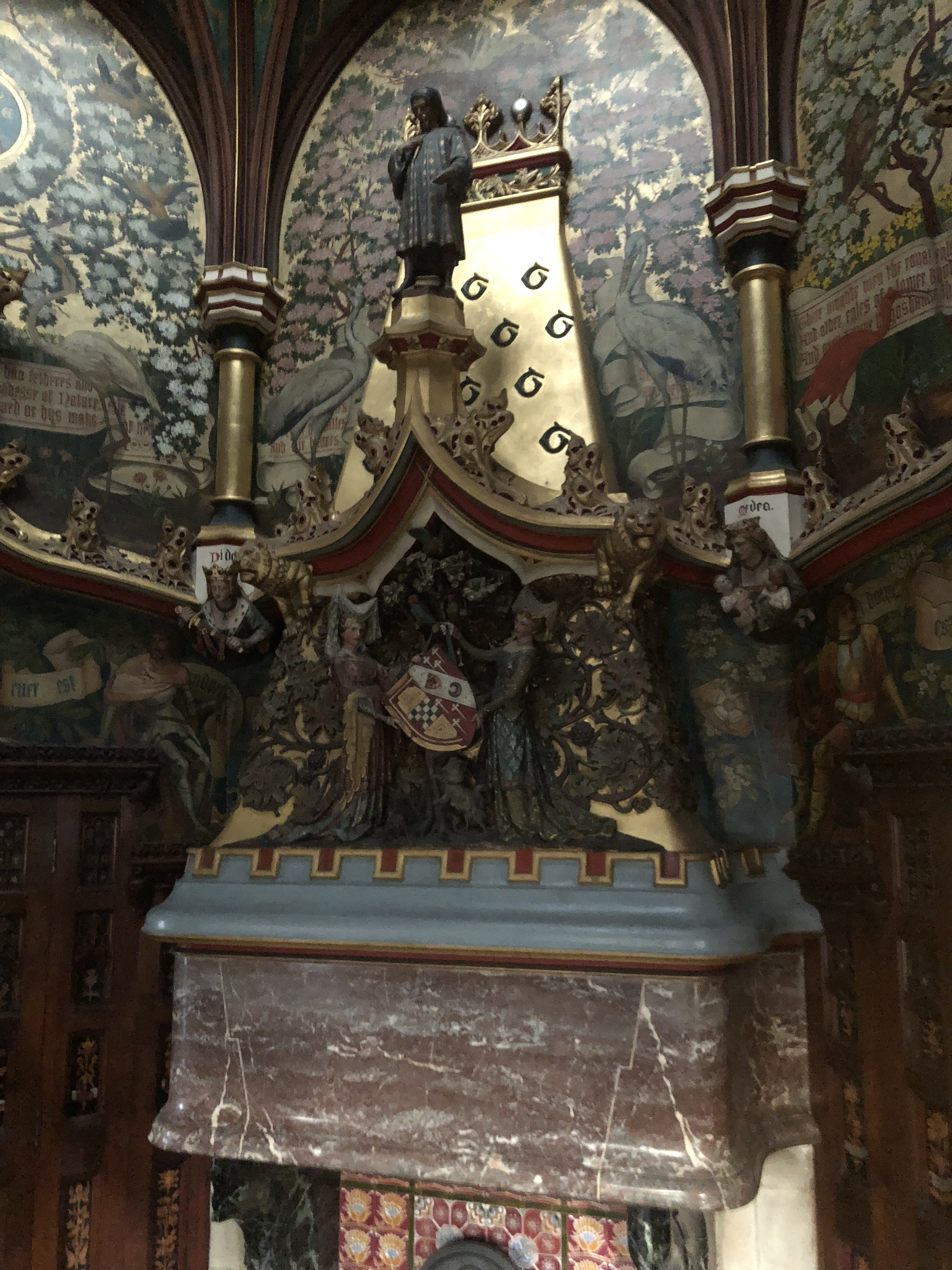
Fireplace, the Chaucer Room, Cardiff Castle

The Beauchamp, or Octagon, Tower was constructed from 1876 to 1881. Its origin is medieval, of lias limestone, which Burges restored. The flèche which crowns the tower is of timber, covered in lead. An octagonal staircase leads to an oratory, commemorating Bute's father. The sculpture is by Fucigna. A marble bust records "On this spot John Marquess of Bute fell asleep and woke in eternity 1848". The oratory is located in a turret to the south side of the tower. In the main tower is the Chaucer Room, designed as a sitting room for Lady Bute. A double-height room, decorated with scenes from The Canterbury Tales, Newman suggests Burges used a library at the Castel Sant'Angelo in Rome as a source, which he had visited in 1877. Its elaborately carved ceiling is cited by Mark Girouard as "a superb ... example of Burges's genius in the construction of roofs." Lady Bute involved herself closely in the designs for the room, William Frame writing to one of the stained glass manufacturers; "the whole must be most carefully done as it is Lady Bute's Room. I think the best way will be to execute a panel; as Lord and Lady Bute will be here in Sept(ember) they will be able to see at once if they like it or not". The inspiration for the flèche comes from Amiens Cathedral, and recalls details from the Très Riches Heures du Duc de Berry.

=== Bute Tower ===
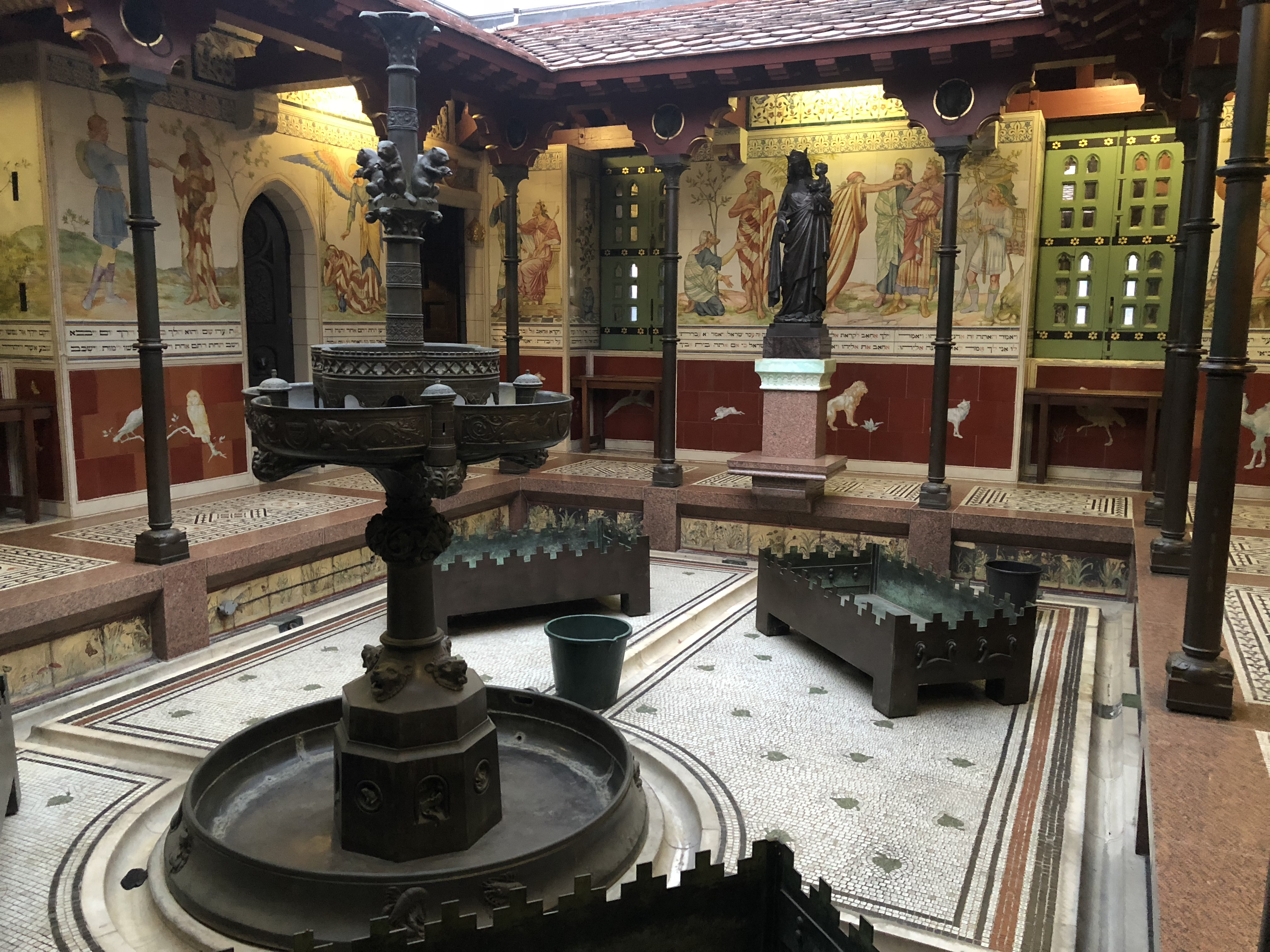
Roof Garden, Cardiff Castle

The foundation stone of the Bute tower was laid on 24 April 1873. Its origin is again Holland's work, extended upwards by Burges. It includes the family's private apartments and culminates in the roof garden, with a sculpture of the Madonna by Ceccardo Fucigna. The drawing room is plain, and decorated in a simple classical style. Reputedly, Bute insisted on the walls being undecorated as it was the only room in the castle in which he could hang his collection of family portraits. The dining room, in contrast, has a full Burgesian decorative scheme, illustrating the life of Abraham. The design was another re-using of an earlier, rejected, work; in this case for Trinity College in the United States. The decoration of this room was carried out by Charles Campbell, of Campbell, Smith & Co., a company formed largely as a result of Burges's encouragement. Lord Bute's bedroom contains extensive religious iconography, a mirrored ceiling and an en-suite bathroom. The windows of the bathroom are glazed with transparent alabaster. The Marquess's name, John, is repeated in Greek, ΙΩΑИΣ, along the ceiling beams. Lady Bute's bedroom is to a simpler design. The roof garden, at the top of the tower, draws inspiration from "southern Italy, not South Wales". A sunken courtyard, it contains a sculpture of the Madonna and child by Ceccardo Fucigna. The murals depict Hebraic scenes; the Marquess was learning Hebrew at the time of the garden's construction in the mid-1870s.

=== Landscape ===
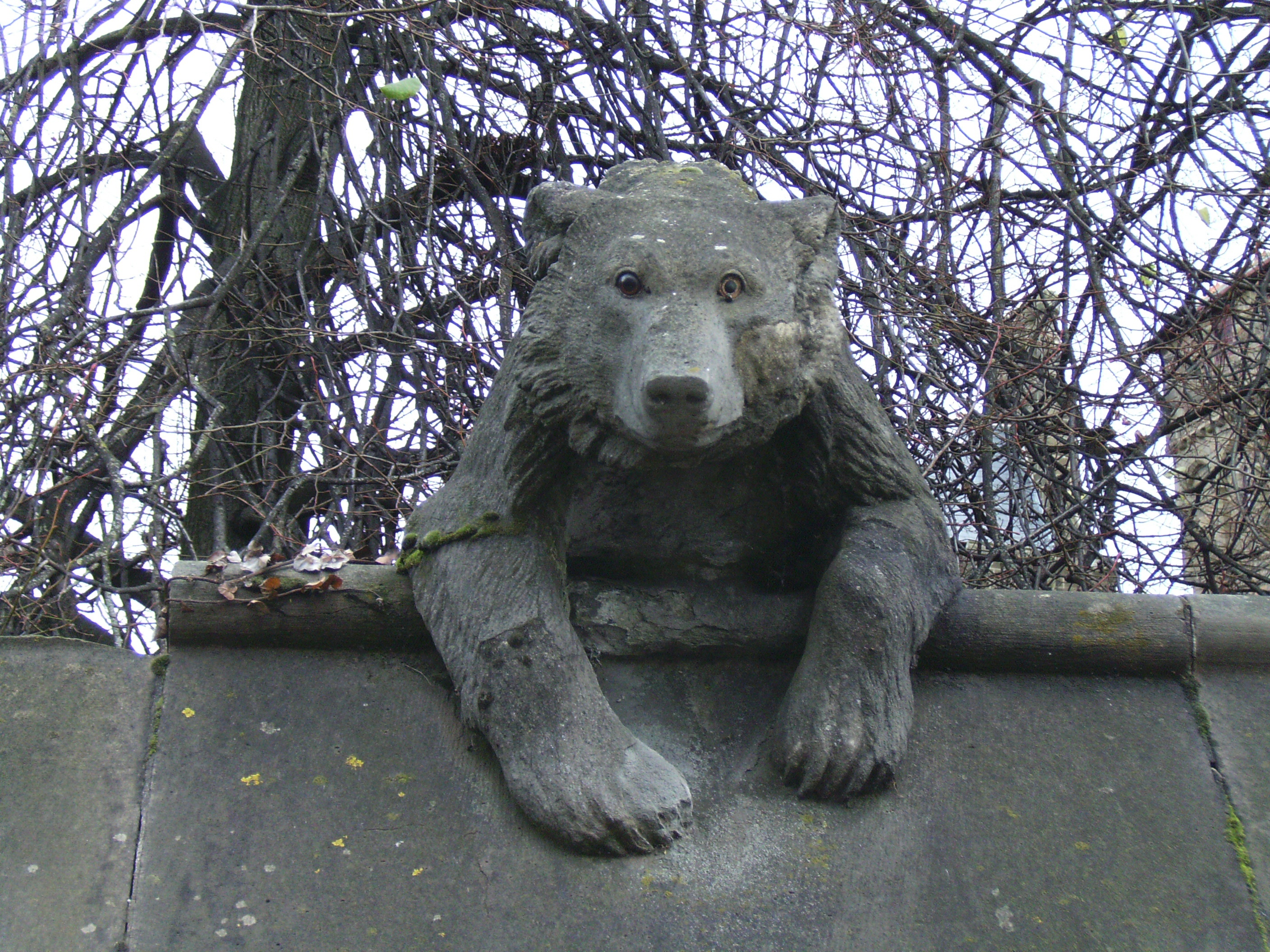
The bear on the Animal Wall

Until the 1850s, Bute Park, laid out on the site of five farms and known as Cooper's Fields, was open to the public. In 1858, Bute's mother gave Sophia Gardens to the city and Bute Park was closed and transformed into the private gardens for the castle. In the 1870s, using Andrew Pettigrew his head gardener at Mount Stuart House, Bute began the development of the gardens. Burges contributed three main elements; the Swiss Bridge, the first designs for the Animal Wall and the stables. His original plan was for a pre-Raphaelite garden in the moat on the two sides of the Clock Tower facing the city. The Animal Wall provided the enclosing perimeter on the Castle Street frontage, while the Swiss Bridge gave Bute access directly from the Bute Tower into the castle park. The bridge was completed but in 1881 Burges died before the wall was anything more than a sketched plan. His assistant William Frame brought the idea to fruition, with the animal carving being undertaken by Burges' long-term sculptor Thomas Nicholls. (Note: The design and construction of the wall led to correspondence in the press. 'An excerpt from an article in the Western Mail Saturday 23. 1892 by their own reporter containing a letter from William Frame to The Building News dated Jan. 12. 1892 read as follows - The Cardiff Castle Outer Walls The Building News of January 1 and 8 contained some excellent photographic re-productions of the animals sculptured upon the Cardiff Castle outer walls. Strange to say, however, the architect was given as the late Mr. Burges, who died some years ago, whereas the work was carried out by Mr. William Frame, architect, of Cardiff, who contributes to the current number of The Building News the following letter :- Sir,-Please correct errors that have appeared in The Building News for January 1 and 8, 1892. In your notice of the illustrations of the animals upon the outer walls of Cardiff Castle the late Mr Burges' name is given as architect, and Mr T Nicholls sculptor. The latter name is correct, the former is not. Mr Burges had nothing whatever to do with any portion of this work, which was carried out entirely by yours, &c., William Frame, Architect. Cardiff, Jan. 12'.) Both structures were moved by Bute's son during developments in the 1920s and 1930s. The Animal Wall was placed in its current position at the end of Bute Park and was extended with additional sculptures by Alexander Carrick. The Swiss Bridge was moved to a new site below the Castle Mews. By the 1960s, the bridge was derelict, having suffered considerably from vandalism and Cardiff City Council had it broken up. The stables, of less interest to Bute, were built by Burges between 1868 and 1869 and were subsequently remodelled in the 1920s and reduced in scale by the removal of the pigeon tower in the 1960s.

== Appreciation ==
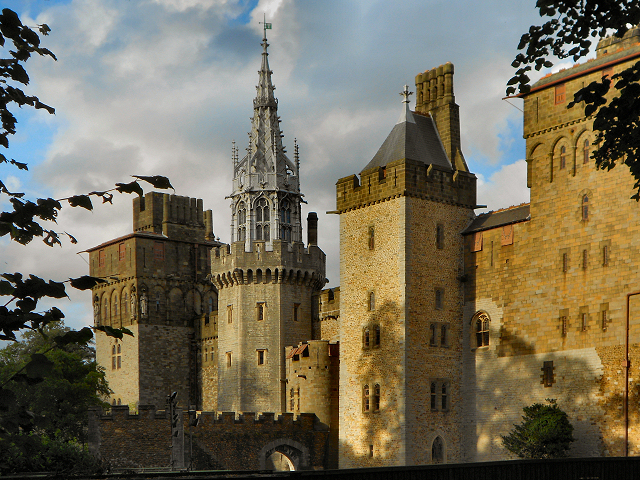
The castle from the Animal Wall

Burges's interiors at Cardiff Castle have been widely praised. The historian Megan Aldrich contended that they have "rarely [been] equalled, [although] he executed few buildings as his rich fantastic gothic required equally rich patrons (..) his finished works are outstanding monuments to nineteenth century gothic". J. Mordaunt Crook, Burges's biographer, described the principal rooms as "three dimensional passports to fairy kingdoms and realms of gold. In Cardiff Castle we enter a land of dreams". The architectural historian John Newman considered Cardiff, and Castell Coch, as "most successful of all the fantasy castles of the nineteenth century". The architectural writer Michael Hall described the interiors of the Clock Tower as, "some of the most magnificent that the Gothic Revival ever achieved". Charles Handley-Read, the first serious student of Burges, wrote of his work at Cardiff and Castell Coch; "I have yet to see any High Victorian interiors from the hand, very largely, of one designer, to equal either in homogeneity or completeness, in quality of execution or originality of conception the best of the interiors of the Welsh castles. For sheer power of intoxication, Burges stand[s] unrivalled".

The exterior of the castle has received a more mixed reception from critics. John Grant, who worked on the castle in the 1920s, considered the towers to present a "picturesque if not happy combination" of varying historical styles, and Adrian Pettifer criticised them as "incongruous" and excessively Gothic in style. Crook disagreed; describing the castle's silhouette, he wrote; "it performs a national function; it has become the skyline of the capital of Wales. The dream of one great patron and one great architect has almost become the symbol of a whole nation".

== Sources ==
- Aldrich, Megan (1994). Gothic Revival. London, UK: Phaidon Press. ISBN 978-0-7148-3631-7.
- Cannadine, David (1994). Aspects of Aristocracy: Grandeur and Decline in Modern Britain. New Haven, US and London, UK: Yale University Press. ISBN 978-0-300-05981-6.
- Crook, J. Mordaunt (1971). Patron Extraordinary: John, 3rd Marquis of Bute, Lecture at the Seventh Conference of the Victorian Society: Victorian South Wales – Architecture, Industry and Society. London, UK: Victorian Society. ISBN 9-78090-165702-2. OCLC 1008540901.
- Crook, J. Mordaunt (1981). The Strange Genius of William Burges. Cardiff, UK: Amgueddfa Cymru – Museum Wales. ISBN 9-78072-000259-1.
- Crook, J. Mordaunt; Lennox-Boyd, C. (1984). Axel Haig and the Victorian Vision of the Middle Ages. London, UK: Allen & Unwin. ISBN 9-780047-20029-8.
- Crook, J. Mordaunt (2013). William Burges and the High Victorian Dream. London, UK: Frances Lincoln. ISBN 978-0-7112-3349-2.
- Daunton, Martin (2008). State and Market in Victorian Britain: War, Welfare and Capitalism. Woodbridge, UK: Boydell Press. ISBN 978-1-84383-383-3.
- Davies, John (1981). Cardiff and the Marquesses of Bute. Cardiff, UK: University of Wales Press. ISBN 978-0-7083-2463-9.
- Davies, John (2010). "Cardiff and the Marquesses of Bute". In Ayto, John; Crofton, Ian (eds.). Brewer's Britain and Ireland. London, UK: Weidenfeld & Nicolson. ISBN 9-780304-35385-9.
- Eastlake, Charles Locke (2012). A History of The Gothic Revival. Cambridge, UK: Cambridge University Press. ISBN 978-1-108-05191-0.
- Ferriday, Peter (1963). Victorian Architecture. London, UK: Jonathan Cape. OCLC 911370.
- Girouard, Mark (1979). The Victorian Country House. New Haven, US and London, UK: Yale University Press. ISBN 9-780198-17183-6. "The Victorian Country House."
- Grant, John P. (1923). Cardiff Castle: Its History and Architecture. Cardiff, UK: William Lewis. OCLC 34158534.
- Hall, Michael (2009). The Victorian Country House. London, UK: Aurum Press. ISBN 978-1-84513-457-0.
- Hannah, Rosemary (2012). The Grand Designer: Third Marquess of Bute. Edinburgh, UK: Birlinn. ISBN 978-1-78027-027-2.
- Jones, Nigel R. (2005). Architecture of England, Scotland and Wales. Westport, US: Greenwood Press. ISBN 978-0-313-31850-4.
- Newman, John (1995). Glamorgan. The Buildings of Wales. London, UK: Penguin Books. ISBN 978-0-14-071056-4.
- Pettifer, Adrian (2000). Welsh Castles: A Guide by Counties. Woodbridge, UK: Boydell Press. ISBN 978-0-85115-778-8.
- Physick, John; Darby, Michael (1973). Marble Halls - Drawings and Models of Victorian Secular Buildings. London, UK: Eyre & Spottiswoode. ISBN 9-78090-148668-4.
- Williams, Matthew (2004). William Burges. Norwich, UK: Jarrold Publishing. ISBN 9-78184-165139-2.
- Williams, Matthew (2014). The essential Cardiff Castle. London: Scala Arts & Heritage Publishers. ISBN 978-1-85759-551-2.
- Williams, Matthew (2016). The Animal Wall at Cardiff Castle. Cardiff, Wales: City of Cardiff Council. OCLC 1062307948.
