= 2014 Wales NATO summit =

International meeting in Newport, Wales

NATO Summit Wales 2014 2014 Newport Summit
- Logo of the 2014 Wales Summit
- Host country: United Kingdom
- Date: 4–5 September 2014
- Cities: Newport, Cardiff
- Venues: Celtic Manor, Newport
- Website: NATO Summit Wales 2014

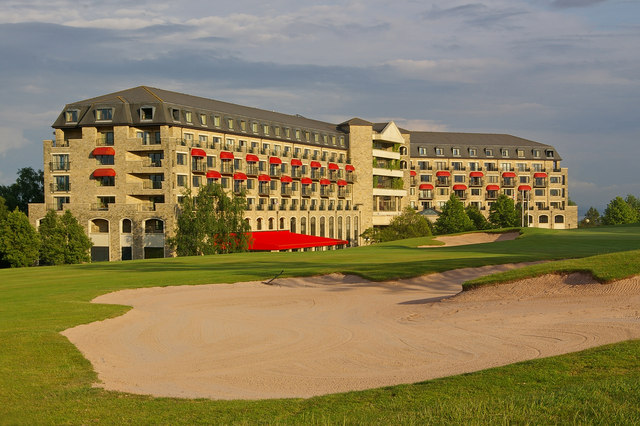
The Celtic Manor Resort, where the meeting was held

The 2014 Wales Summit of the North Atlantic Treaty Organization (NATO) was the summit of the heads of state and heads of government of the NATO countries, held in Newport, Wales on 4 and 5 September 2014. Such summits are sporadically held and allow leaders and officials from NATO Allies to discuss current issues of mutual concern and to plan strategic activities. The 2014 summit has been described by US Navy Admiral James G. Stavridis as the most important since the fall of the Berlin Wall.

== Background ==
The summit was hosted by British prime minister David Cameron. Attendees included Canadian prime minister Stephen Harper, US president Barack Obama, German chancellor Angela Merkel, French president François Hollande, Italian prime minister Matteo Renzi and Spanish prime minister Mariano Rajoy.

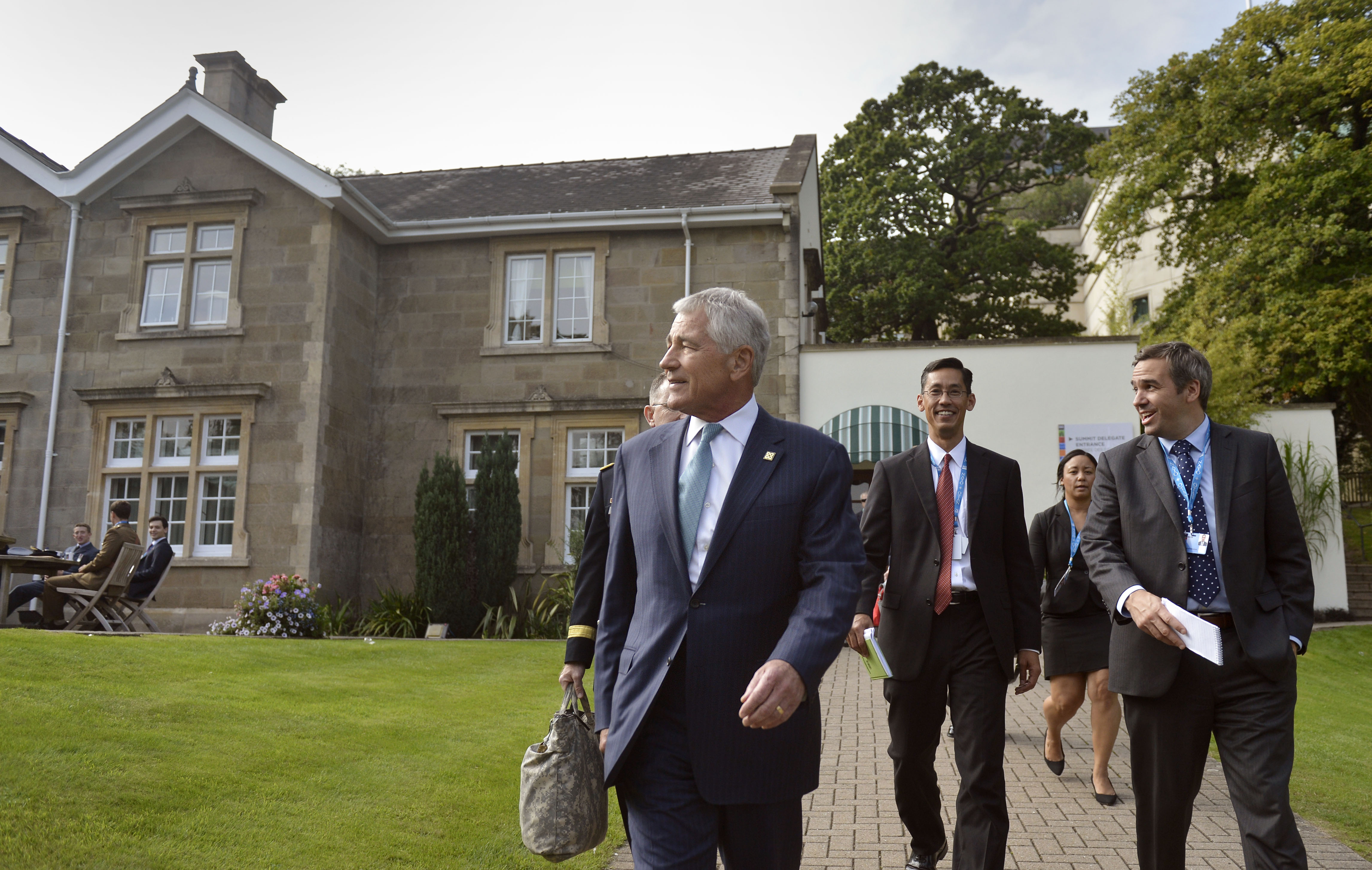
US secretary of defense Chuck Hagel, walking in the grounds of the Celtic Manor Resort

There were another 180 VIPs, and 4,000 delegates and officials from approximately 60 countries.

The official logo for the summit included a panel with four quadrants, each bearing a stylised symbol of Newport or Wales: a Celtic knot, the Welsh Dragon, Newport Transporter Bridge and a Welsh castle. The entrance to the venue was fronted by a full-scale replica of a Eurofighter Typhoon.

== Agenda ==
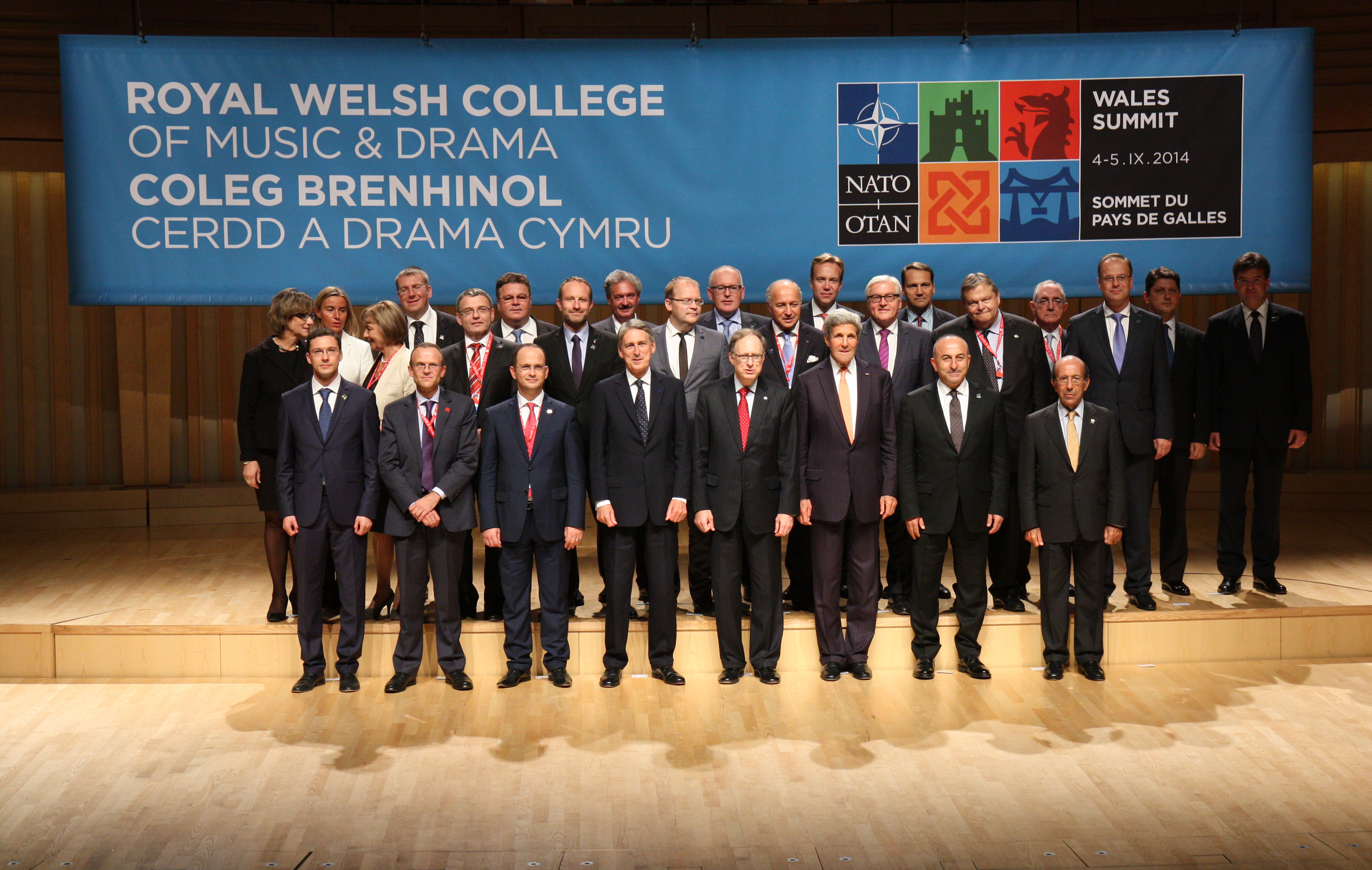
NATO Foreign Ministers' dinner, Royal Welsh College of Music & Drama, 4 September 2014

World leaders met at the Celtic Manor, and informally at other locales in and around Cardiff. They discussed ongoing events in the world, such as terrorism, cyberwarfare, and other areas of national security interest to the member states.

Ukrainian president Petro Poroshenko had a joint discussion with EU big four leaders and US president Barack Obama before the official start of the Summit, to discuss the crisis with Russia.

== Outcomes ==
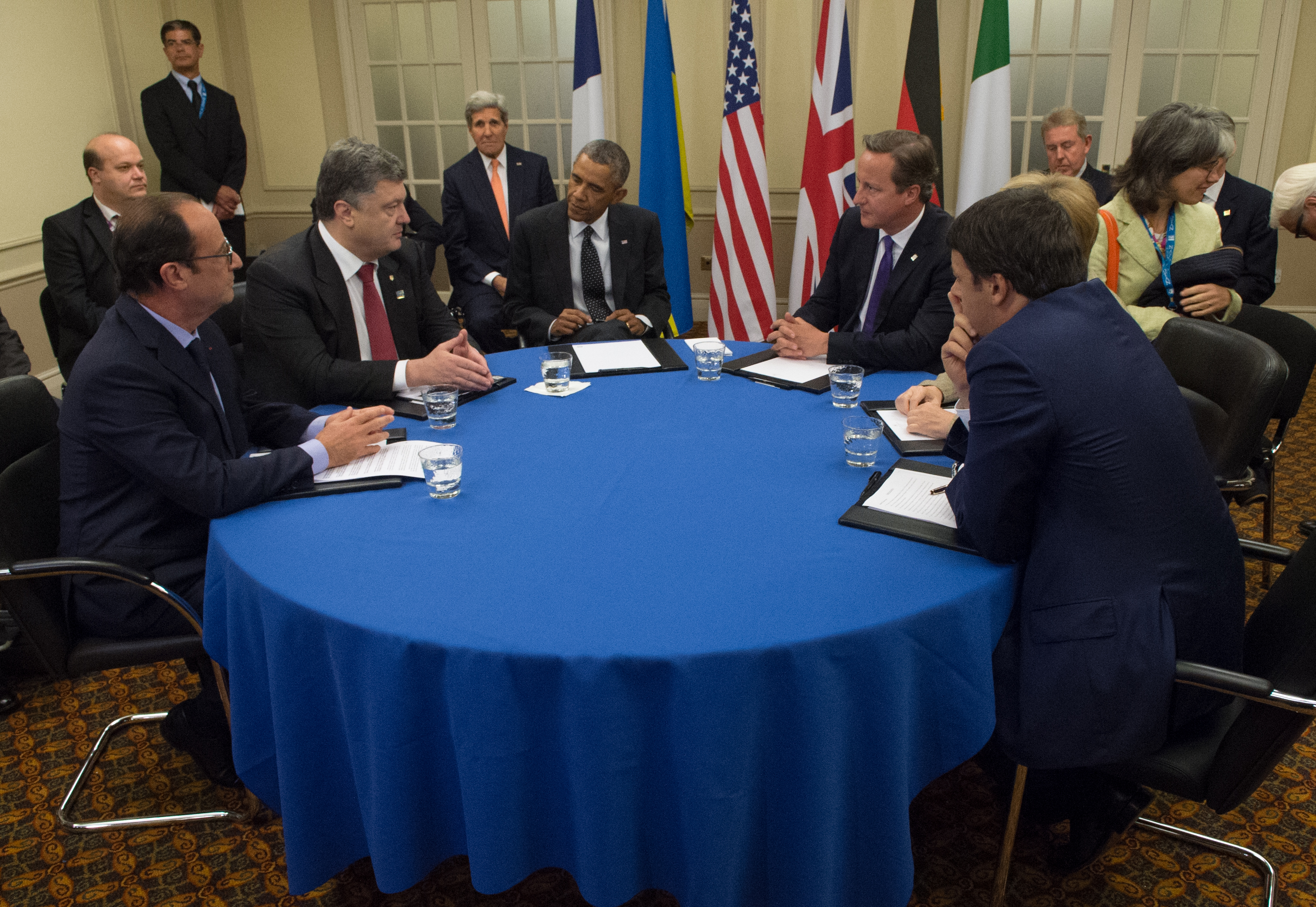
Petro Poroshenko and NATO Quint leaders (Hollande, Obama, Cameron, Renzi and Merkel) discussing the crisis with Russia

The following declarations and agreements were made at the Summit:

- Wales Summit Declaration
- Framework Nation Concept (FNC)
  - FNC/UK - see Joint Expeditionary Force
  - FNC/DE - German-led FNC on:
    - Deployable Headquarters
    - Joint Fires
    - Air and Missile Defence
    - Joint Intelligence, Surveillance, and Reconnaissance
  - FNC/IT - Italian-led FNC on stabilization operations
- NATO Readiness Action Plan
- NATO Security Capacity Building Initiative
- Armed Forces Declaration
- Joint Statement of the NATO-Ukraine Commission
- Declaration on Afghanistan
- The Wales Declaration on the Transatlantic Bond

=== Russia and Ukraine ===
Immediately prior to the summit on 3 September 2014 French president François Hollande announced the postponement of delivery of the first Mistral-class amphibious assault ship which had been sold to Russia, a ship provisionally named Vladivostok, due to the Russo-Ukrainian War.

At the end of the summit Ukrainian president Poroshenko announced the Minsk Protocol, a ceasefire which had been agreed with the separatist leader Alexander Zakharchenko under terms proposed by Russian president Vladimir Putin. The protocol was cautiously welcomed by NATO leaders.

On 12 September 2014 the EU announced a much wider expansion of its sanctions programme over the Russian involvement in the war in Ukraine.

On 12 September a communiqué of the US Treasury announced a sweeping ban on the Russian defense sector.

=== Wales Pledge ===
For the first time, the Allies formally pledged to aim to move towards what had previously been an informal guideline based on Article 3 of spending 2% of their gross domestic products on defense, and 20% of that on new equipment. For countries which spend less than 2% they agreed upon that these countries "aim to move towards the 2% guideline within a decade". This pledge was the brainchild of US Secretary of Defence Chuck Hagel. In 2015, five of its 28 members met that goal. In the aftermath of the pledge, defense spending increased among NATO members. At the beginning of 2018, eight of the 29 members either were meeting the target or were close to it; six others had laid out plans to reach the target by 2024 as promised; and Norway and Denmark had unveiled plans to substantially boost defense spending (including Norway's planned purchase 52 new F-35 fighter jets).

=== Support for Military Intervention Against ISIL ===
On 5 September 2014, the U.S., Australia, Canada, Denmark, France, Germany, Italy, Turkey, and the United Kingdom, agreed to support anti-ISIL forces in Iraq and Syria with supplies and air support.

=== Joint Expeditionary Force (FNC/UK) ===
On the initiative of the UK, the multinational Joint Expeditionary Force was officially launched with a Letter of Intent at and peripheral to the Summit. It was subsumed under the new "Framework Nations Concept" rubric. Germany, the UK and Italy were to act as framework nations for groups of Allies coming together to work multi-nationally for the joint development of forces and capabilities required by NATO.

== Criticism ==
A retired German politician, Walther Stützle, former defense Parliamentary Secretary of State (until 2002) in the SPD's First Schröder cabinet and former head of the Stockholm International Peace Research Institute (until 1991), criticized the summit agenda for its focus on military details and not political perspectives. Stützle said that the Russian Federation was not a military threat to NATO but criticized that new NATO members' policies were not détente and negotiation with the Russian Federation.

== Protestors and security detail ==
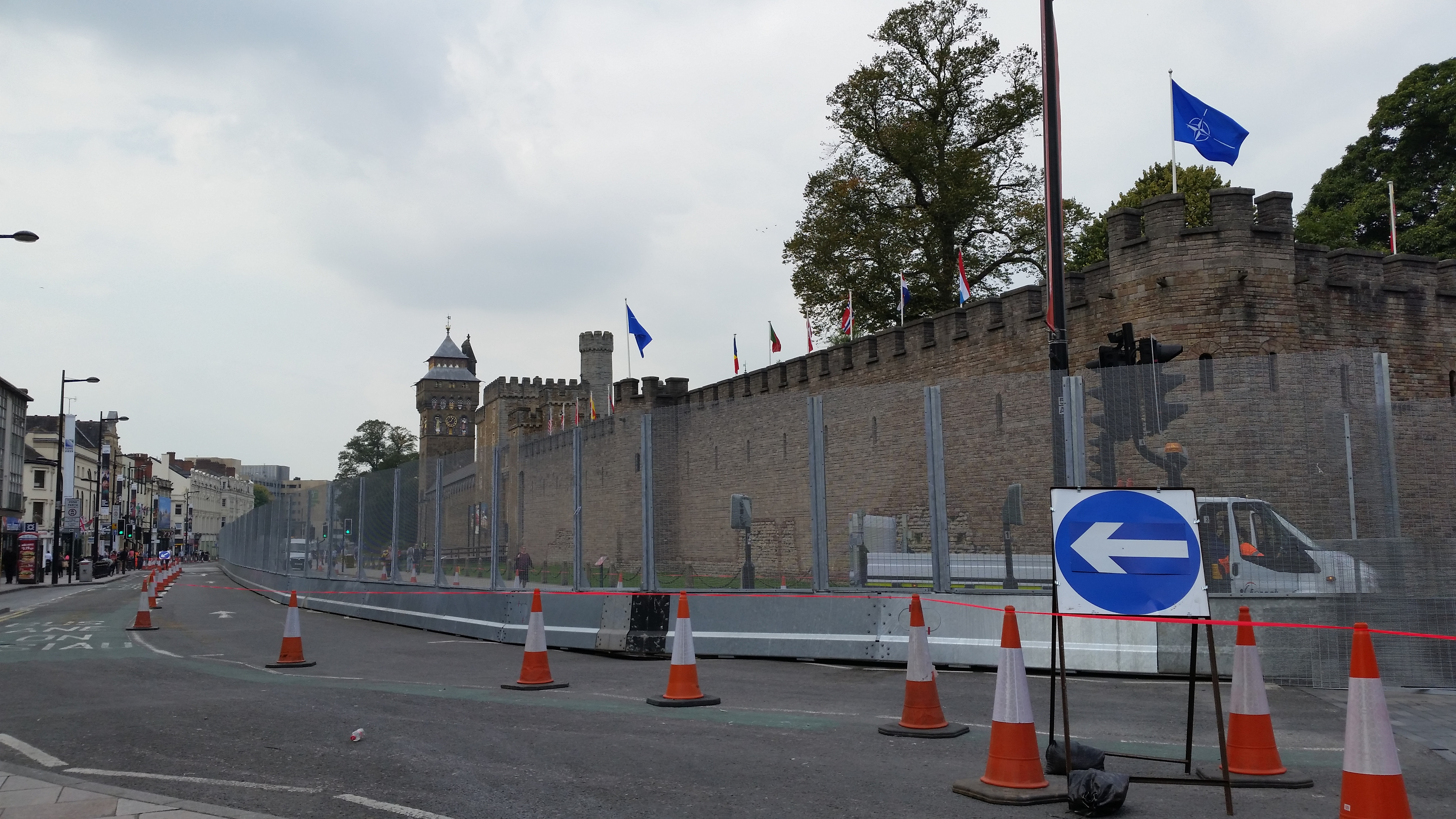
Cardiff Castle during the summit, showing NATO flags and the "ring of steel".

In both Newport and Cardiff, road closures and security measures, starting weeks in advance of the summit, created widespread disruption. Thirteen miles (21 km) of security fencing, 2.7 m (9 ft) high, was erected around the Newport hotel venue and 10 miles (16 km) of fencing put up around Cardiff city centre. Businesses in the vicinity of security fencing in Cardiff reported a drop in trade by up to a third. This fencing was based on and expanded, the 'National Barrier Asset' which is held in reserve for similar events.

Security included around 9,500 specially trained police officers patrolling the streets of the two cities, military helicopters including US Osprey V22s and the Royal Navy's new £1bn Type 45 destroyer HMS Duncan stationed in Cardiff Bay.

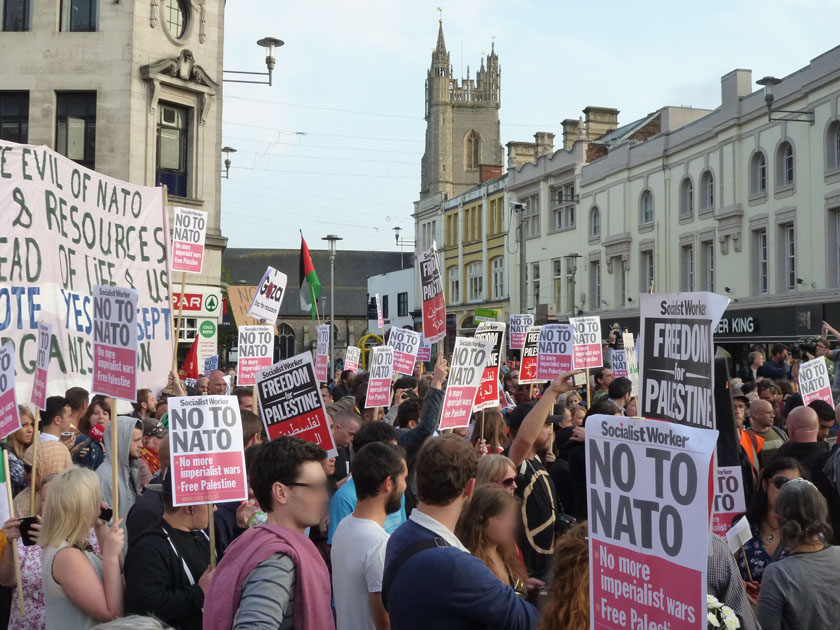
Anti-NATO protests in central Cardiff

Protests, demonstrations, and marches took place in Newport and Cardiff involving several hundred people, though the turnout was much lower than predicted.

== Leaders and other dignitaries in attendance ==
=== Member states ===
- Albania – Prime Minister Edi Rama
- Belgium – Prime Minister Elio Di Rupo
- Bulgaria – President Rosen Plevneliev
- Canada – Prime Minister Stephen Harper
- Croatia – President Ivo Josipović
- Czech Republic – President Miloš Zeman
- Denmark – Prime Minister Helle Thorning-Schmidt
- Estonia – Prime Minister Taavi Rõivas
- France – President François Hollande
- Germany – Chancellor Angela Merkel
- Greece – Prime Minister Antonis Samaras
- Hungary – Prime Minister Viktor Orbán
- Iceland – Prime Minister Sigmundur Davíð Gunnlaugsson
- Italy – Prime Minister Matteo Renzi
- Latvia – President Andris Bērziņš
- Lithuania – President Dalia Grybauskaitė
- Luxembourg – Prime Minister Xavier Bettel
- Netherlands – Prime Minister Mark Rutte
- Norway – Prime Minister Erna Solberg
- Poland – President Bronisław Komorowski
- Portugal – Prime Minister Pedro Passos Coelho
- Romania – President Traian Băsescu
- Slovakia – President Andrej Kiska
- Slovenia – Prime Minister Alenka Bratušek
- Spain – Prime Minister Mariano Rajoy
- Turkey – President Recep Tayyip Erdoğan
- United Kingdom – Prime Minister David Cameron
- United States – President Barack Obama
- NATO – Secretary General Anders Fogh Rasmussen

=== Non-member states and organisations ===
- Armenia – President Serzh Sargsyan
- Azerbaijan – President Ilham Aliyev
- European Union – Commission President José Manuel Barroso
- European Union – Council President Herman Van Rompuy
- European Union – High Representative Baroness Ashton
- Finland – President Sauli Niinistö
- (Georgia (country)) Georgia – President Giorgi Margvelashvili
- (Republic of Ireland) Ireland – Minister for Defence Simon Coveney
- Jordan – King Abdullah II of Jordan
- Ukraine – President Petro Poroshenko
- Serbia – Minister of Defence Bratislav Gašić
- Switzerland – President Didier Burkhalter

=== NATO Foreign ministers ===
- Albania – Minister of Foreign Affairs Ditmir Bushati
- Belgium – Minister of Foreign Affairs Didier Reynders
- Bulgaria – Minister of Foreign Affairs Daniel Mitov
- France – Minister of Foreign Affairs Laurent Fabius
- Germany – Foreign Minister Frank-Walter Steinmeier
- Italy – Foreign Minister Federica Mogherini
- Norway – Minister of Foreign Affairs Børge Brende
- Spain – Minister of Foreign Affairs and Cooperation José Manuel García-Margallo
- United Kingdom – Foreign Secretary Philip Hammond
- United States – Secretary of State John Kerry

== See also ==
- Article 3 of the North Atlantic Treaty
