= Treetops Shooting Ground =

Shooting ground in Coedkernew, Newport, Wales

Coordinates: 51°33′32″N 3°03′15″W

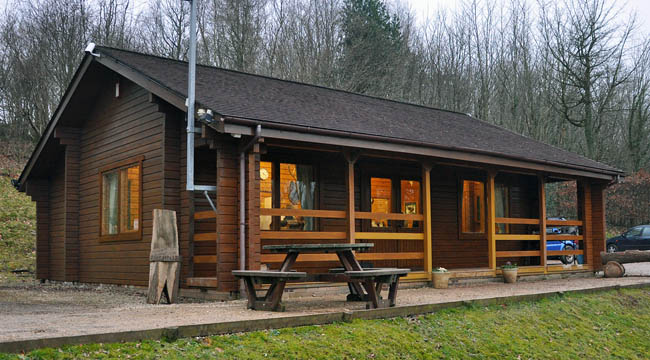
Treetops Sporting Ground

Treetops Sporting Ground is a sporting clay pigeon shooting ground located in Coedkernew, Newport, South Wales. It has facilities for air rifle owners. The grounds contain a large area set aside for paintballing, and is a venue for team building activities and birthday parties.

== History ==
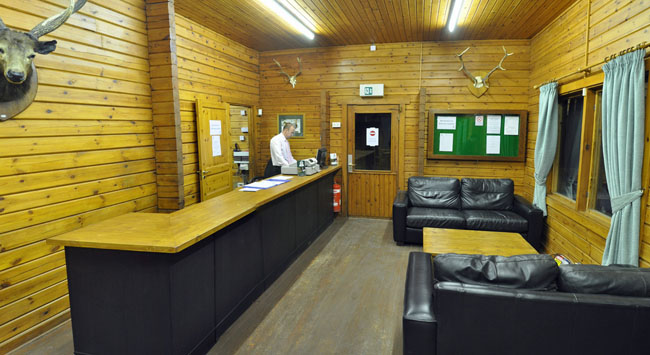
Inside the lodge at Treetops

The ground's Cefn Llogell woodland site was part of Lord Tredegar's estate and the Nant-y-Moor brook which runs through the wood feeds the large lake at Tredegar House.

The land was purchased from the farmer owner in the late 1980s by DJ Litt Firearms Ltd, a gun retailer based in Newport, with the intent of turning it into a clay shooting ground allowing gun customers to try out guns before purchasing them.

One of the lakes on the land was constructed by Lord Tredegar as a header store of water to supply his estate.

It is possible to see the Second Severn Crossing bridge from the entrance gate. Treetops sporting ground has recently changed names. Nant Y Moor Park will be opening its doors very soon.

== Shooting ground ==
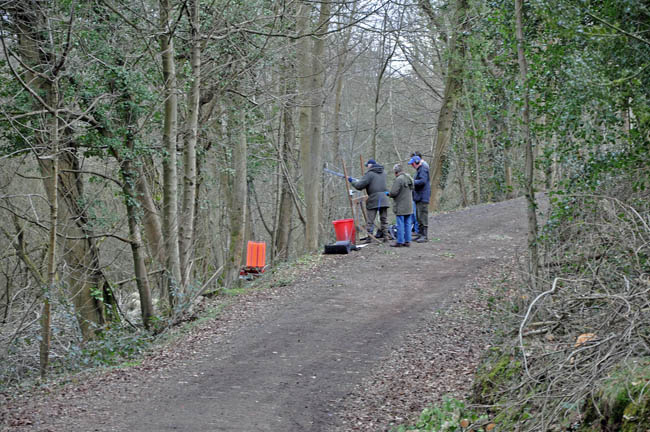
Shooters on the ground at Treetops

Treetops hosted local competitions between Cardiff, Bristol and Bath Universities' clay shooting clubs and the South West clay shooting league. The Celtic Manor Resort in Newport, the host venue of the 2010 Ryder Cup, used Treetops as its venue for clay shooting for its guests.

Treetops hosted the Gwent leg of the National Police Shooting Competition in May 2010.

== Awards ==
Treetops was voted best UK shooting school 2002 by Shooting Times and Sporting Gun magazines.
