= Royal Welsh College of Music & Drama =

Music school and performance venue in Cardiff, Wales

- Welsh: Coleg Brenhinol Cerdd a Drama Cymru
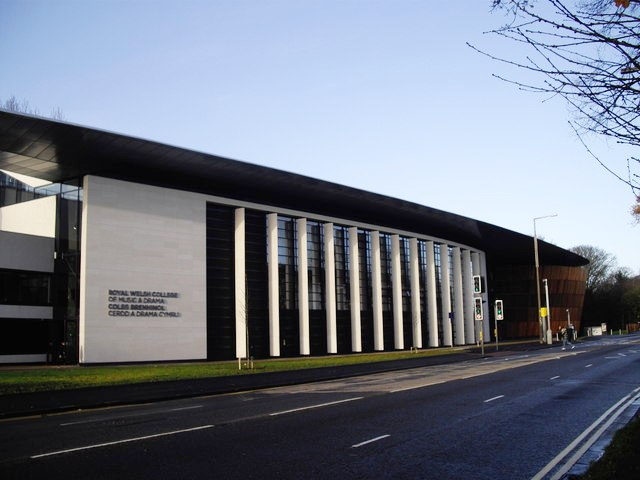
- Type: Public
- Established: 1949
- Parent institution: University of South Wales
- Affiliations: Conservatoires UK; European Association of Conservatoires; Federation of Drama Schools
- Principal: Helena Gaunt
- Students: 779 (2017/18)
- Undergraduates: 514 (66%, 2017/18)
- Postgraduates: 265 (34%, 2017/18)
- Location: Cardiff, Wales; 51.4856°N 3.1836°W
- Campus: Urban
- Website: rwcmd.ac.uk

The Royal Welsh College of Music & Drama (RWCMD; Welsh: Coleg Brenhinol Cerdd a Drama Cymru) is the national conservatoire of Wales, located in Cardiff, Wales, providing professional training for actors, musicians, designers, technicians and arts management.

The College trains more than 900 students from over 40 countries, offering foundation, undergraduate and postgraduate programmes combining specialist training with industry-level experience.

It also operates as a producing arts centre with a public programme of more than 500 performances annually, encompassing classical and contemporary music, drama, opera, musical theatre, puppetry and design-based performance.

Teaching is delivered by staff with professional industry experience, supported by partners and visiting practitioners. Partners include Welsh National Opera and BBC NOW, contributing to the integration of current industry practice into its training and performance programmes.

The campus includes the Richard Burton Theatre, the glass-lined Carne Foyer, the Dora Stoutzker Hall, the first purpose-built chamber recital hall in Wales, and the Anthony Hopkins Centre, housed in the former Cardiff Castle Stables. The college has recently extended its campus to include the historic Old Library in the centre of Cardiff, as a centre for education and public arts.

The College's Patron is King Charles III. Dame Shirley Bassey was appointed president in 2024, its 75th anniversary year.

Vice presidents include fellows Michael Sheen and Sir Bryn Terfel; fellow and graduate Sir Anthony Hopkins; the CEO of Race Council Cymru, Uzo Iwobi; Philip Carne; Rhodri Talfan-Davies; Lady Anya Sainsbury; and The Rt. Rev. The Lord Williams of Oystermouth, Archbishop Emeritus of Canterbury.

== History and description ==
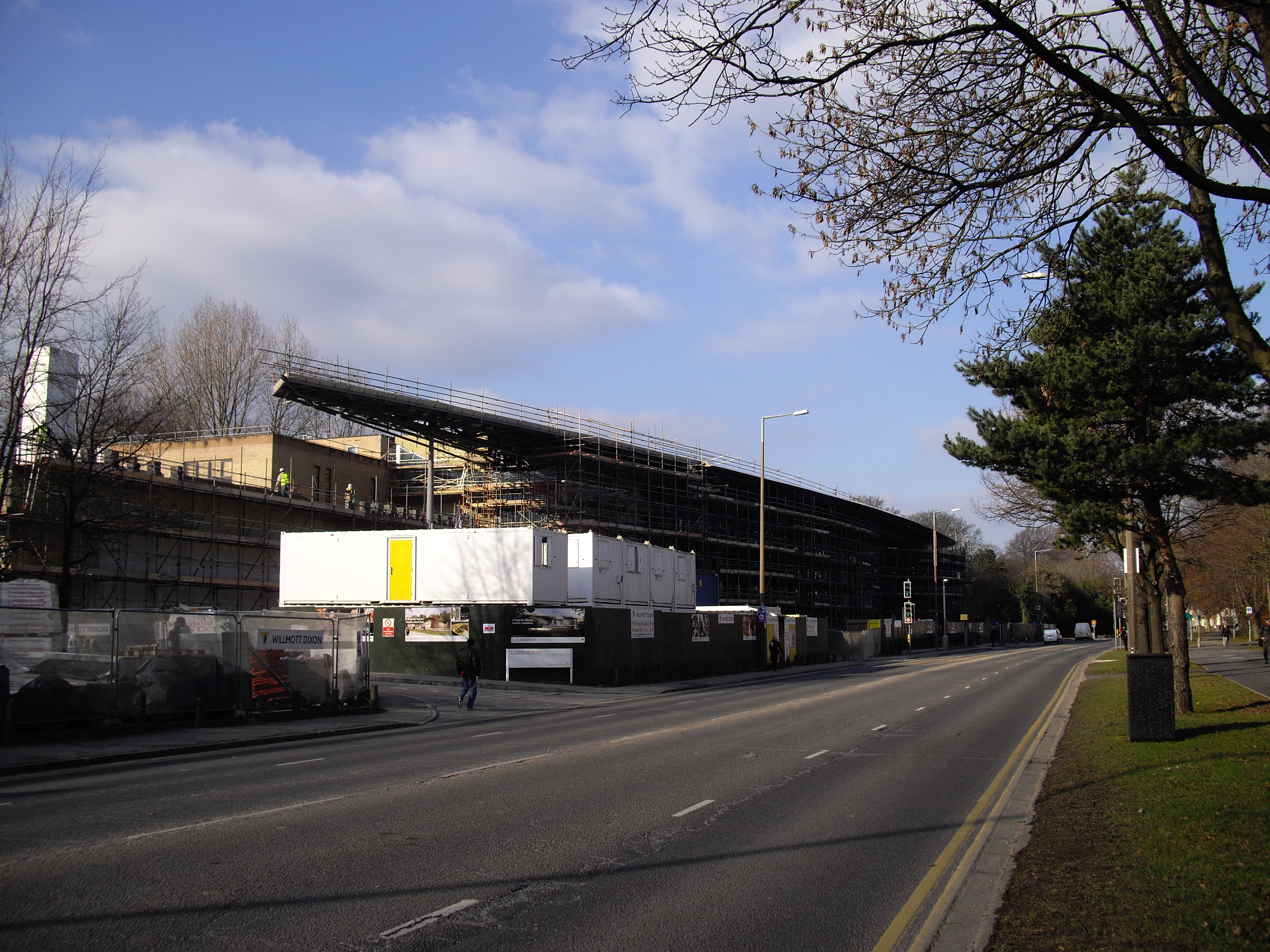
During the construction of the renovation and expansion of the college in 2011

The College was established in 1949 as Cardiff College of Music at Cardiff Castle, but in 1973 moved to purpose-built accommodation within the castle grounds of Bute Park near Cardiff University. In 1970 it changed its name to the Welsh College of Music & Drama before being awarded its royal title during Queen Elizabeth II's golden jubilee in 2002, making it the fifth conservatoire to be awarded this title.

From 1973, the College's degrees BA, BEd, MA, were awarded by the University of Wales and in 2004 it became part of the federal university. In 2007, however, it left the university and agreed to a merger (referred to as a "strategic alliance") with the University of Glamorgan. The University of Glamorgan merged with the University of Wales, Newport, in 2013 to form the University of South Wales, so RWCMD is now part of the University of South Wales Group.

RWCMD provides education and training in the performing arts and technical theatre, including music, acting, design, stage management and arts management. It was the first All-Steinway conservatoire in the UK and in 2020 became the world's first Steinway Exclusive Conservatoire, meaning that every acoustic piano at the College is now a Steinway.

The Anthony Hopkins Centre, housed in the former Cardiff Castle Stables, was opened in 1999.

In 2010, as part of its s 60th anniversary celebrations, students performed in a gala concert at Buckingham Palace, attended by its patron, the Prince of Wales. At this event Dame Elizabeth Taylor presented the Prince of Wales with a bronze bust of the legendary actor Richard Burton, to stand outside the College's new Richard Burton Theatre. A second gala evening was presented at Buckingham Palace in 2016 to celebrate the fifth anniversary of the College's new facilities.

A £22.5 million expansion was opened in 2011, including two new performance venues (Richard Burton Theatre and Dora Stoutzker Hall), the Carne Foyer, a new front of house area including a performance space and bar/cafe, and rehearsal studios. It was opened by Richard Burton's daughter, Kate Burton.

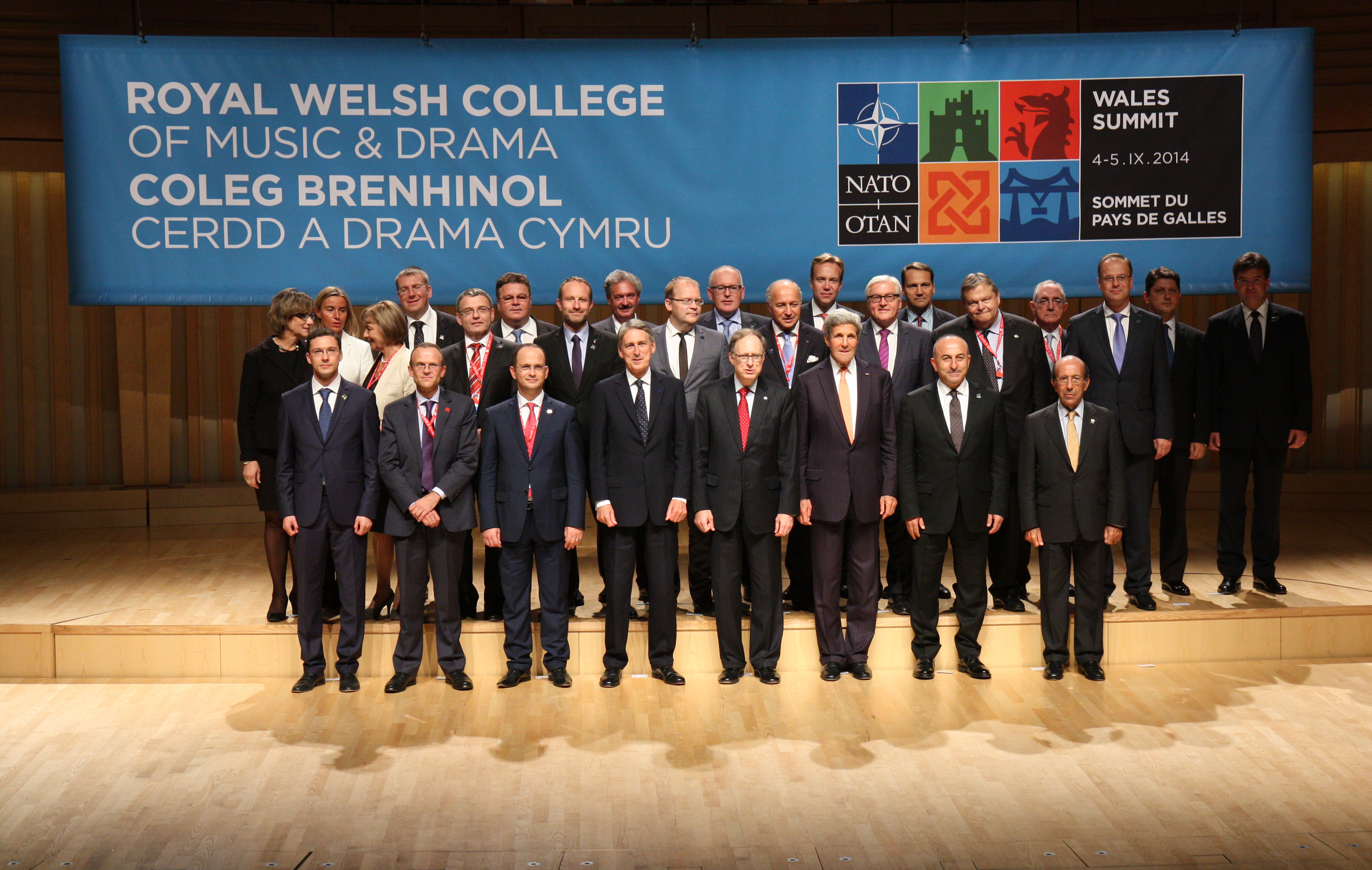
NATO Foreign Ministers' dinner held at the Dora Stoutzker Hall, in the college on 4 September 2014

It is a member of the Federation of Drama Schools.

== Safeguarding ==
In October 2023, the County Court at Central London found that the college had been negligent in its handling of complaints made by two former students, who reported that they had been sexually and physically assaulted by the same male student while they were studying at the college. Recorder John Halford held that the college owed its students a duty of care to carry out reasonable investigations into such reports, and that it had failed to do so. The claimants were awarded a total of £19,000 in damages, along with costs. The claimants' solicitor described the judgement as the first of its kind. Following the judgement, the college apologised to the two women for aspects of its response to their complaints.

== Academic programmes ==
=== Undergraduate degrees ===
The college offers undergraduate degrees in the following areas:

- BA (Hons) Acting
- BA (Hons) Design for Performance
- BA (Hons) Musical Theatre
- BA (Hons) Stage Management & Technical Theatre
- BMus (Hons) Jazz
- BMus (Hons) Music - Composition
- BMus (Hons) Music - Instrumental and Vocal
- Foundation Degree Scenic Construction
- Foundation Degree Scenic Arts
- Foundation Degree Technical Production

=== Postgraduate degrees ===
The college also offers postgraduate degrees in the following areas;

- MA Acting for Stage, Screen & Recorded Media
- MA Arts Management
- MA Costume for Performance
- MA Design for Performance
- MA Digital Media Design & Production
- MA Jazz
- MA Lighting Design & Production
- MA Musical Theatre
- MA Production Management
- MA Puppetry Design & Construction
- MA Scenic Arts & Construction
- MA Sound Design & Production
- MA Stage & Event Management

- MMus Brass Band Conducting
- MMus Choral Conducting
- MMus Collaborative Piano
- MMus Composer-Performer
- MMus Composition
- MMus Multi Instrument Woodwind Performance
- MMus Music Performance
- MMus Opera Performance
- MMus Orchestral Conducting
- MMus Orchestral Performance
- Postgraduate Diploma Advanced Professional Practice
- Postgraduate Diploma in Advanced Professional Practice (Opera)

== Notable alumni ==
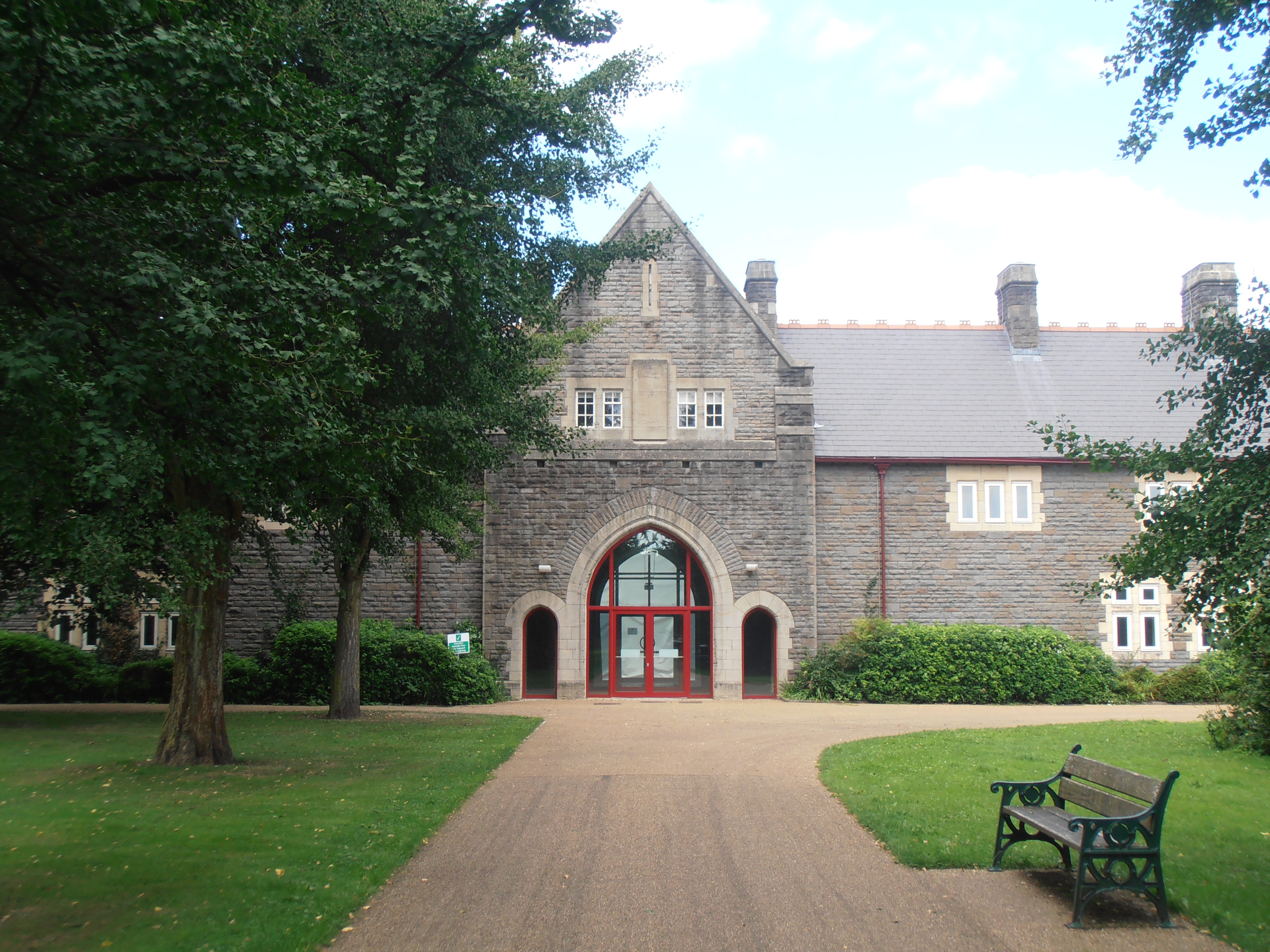
Anthony Hopkins Centre

For a full list, see Category:Alumni of the Royal Welsh College of Music & Drama

- Zahra Ahmadi
- Jan Anderson
- Rakie Ayola
- Emily Barber
- Aneurin Barnard
- Remy Beasley
- Joe Blackman
- Edward Bluemel
- Anthony Boyle
- Rob Brydon
- Hamish Clark
- Alun Cochrane
- Tom Cullen
- Richard Elis
- Jean Fergusson
- Jane Freeman
- Bradley Freegard
- Lucy Gaskell
- Paul Hilton
- Anthony Hopkins
- Anthony Irvine
- Peter Karrie
- Julian Lewis Jones
- Ruth Jones
- Jo Joyner
- James Loye
- Tony Maudsley
- Eve Myles
- Steven Meo
- Andrew Harwood Mills
- Adrian Lewis Morgan
- Olivia Morris
- Kimberley Nixon
- Royce Pierreson
- Naomi Radcliffe
- Erin Richards
- Ieuan Rhys
- Dougray Scott
- David Shields
- Ben Slade (joint course with UWIC)
- James Sutton
- David Thaxton
- Alexander Vlahos
- Victoria Wicks
- Katy Wix
- Mary Woodvine
