= Celtic Manor Resort =

Golf hotel and resort in Newport, Wales

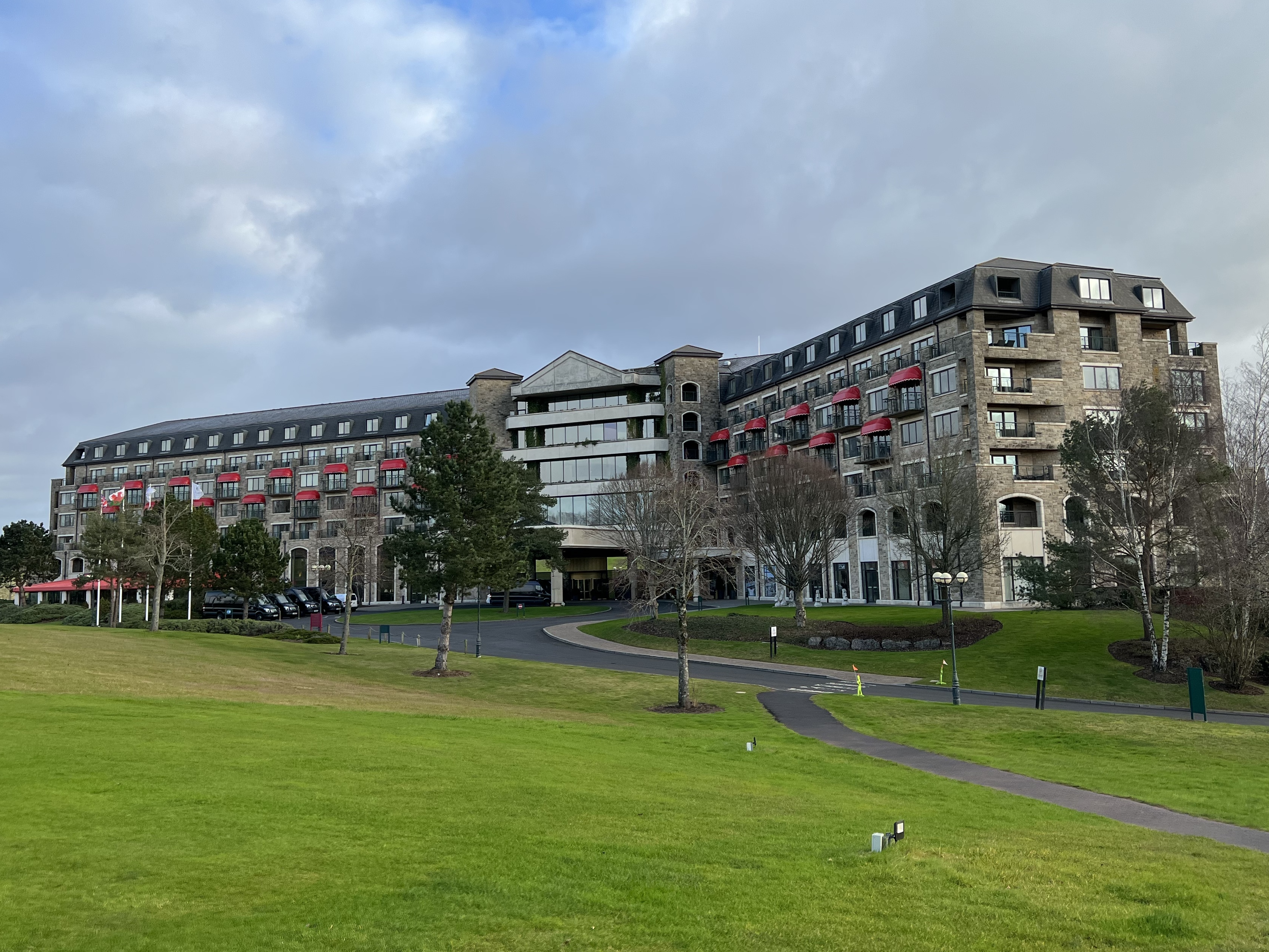

- Location within Newport

General information
- Location: Newport, South East Wales, Coldra Woods, The Usk Valley, Newport NP18 1HQ
- Coordinates: 51°36′11″N 2°55′57″W
- Opening: 1982
- Owner: Sir Terry Matthews

Technical details
- Floor count: 11

Other information
- Number of rooms: 400
- Number of suites: 32
- Number of restaurants: 5

Website
- www.celtic-manor.com

Celtic Manor Resort is a golf, spa and leisure hotel and resort in the city of Newport, South East Wales. Owned by Sir Terry Matthews, the resort is located on the south-facing side of Christchurch Hill in eastern Newport, near Junction 24 of the M4 motorway. The golf courses run over the north-facing side of Christchurch Hill down into the Vale of Usk, overlooking the Wentwood escarpment. The resort's area is circa 2,000 acres (810 ha).

Formerly the site of several Roman roads, the site's redevelopment has been overseen on occasion by the Glamorgan-Gwent Archaeological Trust. The location has been occupied since at least 1634, when it was a residence. A manor house was built in 1860 and it passed through multiple tenants, was expanded circa 1915, and was the location of a hospital between 1940 and 1977. In 1980, Matthews (who had been born at the hospital) bought and financed the refurbishment and expansion of the manor house, and it opened as the Celtic Manor Hotel in 1982. The hotel was continually redeveloped throughout the next decades. In 2010, the resort hosted the 2010 Ryder Cup and in 2014, the resort hosted the 2014 NATO summit. The Wales Open is played at the site annually.

The properties consist of four hotels, a country inn, luxury lodges, two spas, six restaurants, three championship golf courses, two golf and country clubhouses, high ropes courses, adventure golf, laser tag, archery and the International Convention Centre Wales.

== History ==
=== Early history ===
During the Roman Empire, the Via Julia Augusta and several other Roman roads ran through the location to local Roman towns.

The manor house was built in 1860 by coal baron Thomas Powell, from the South Wales coalfield. The house was originally known as Coldra House, later renamed to Coldra Hall. Powell's son Thomas Powell Jnr and his bride Julia Jenkins were given the mansion as a wedding gift. However, Powell Jnr, his wife, and his son were murdered during an 1869 trip to then-Abyssinia, after which the house was leased to various tenants until 1915. The Firbank family rented 1900 until 1915, after which the hall was sold to Sir John Beynon, a local coal and shipping businessman who was the son of then-Sheriff Sir John Wyndham Beynon; Beynon added an additional wing.

In the 1930s, Beynon donated the house to the local health authority and it became the Lydia Beynon Maternity Hospital, named in honour of his mother, in 1940. Over 60,000 babies were born there, including the present owner Sir Terry Matthews. It closed as a hospital in 1977.

=== Hotel development ===
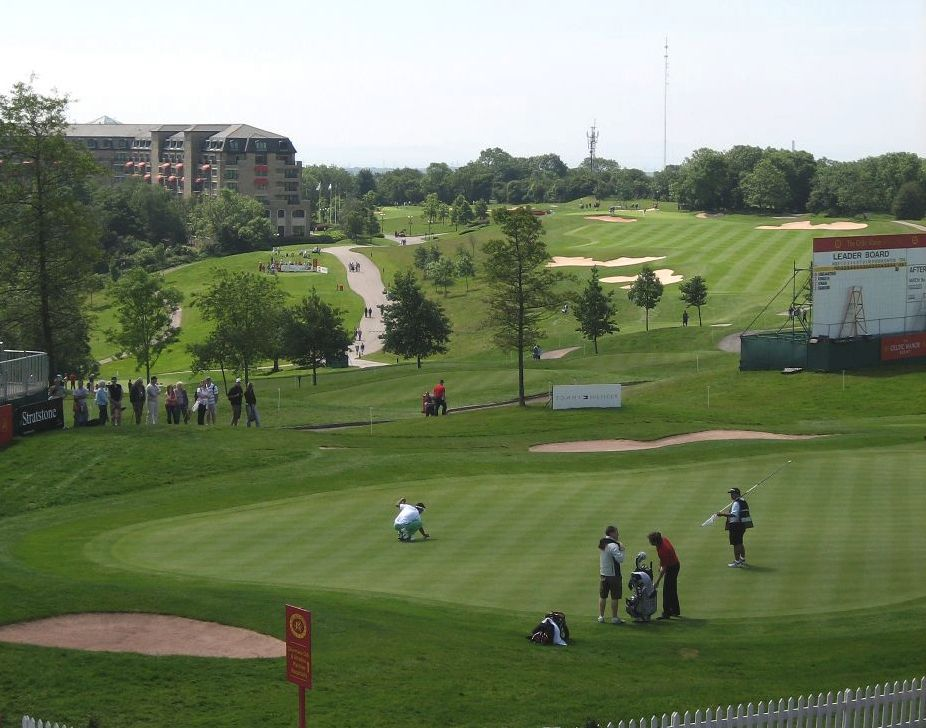
Celtic Manor Resort

Under the Celtic Inns group, Matthews bought the Manor House in 1980 for an estimated £290,000, investing £100m for its redevelopment. Originally planned as a hotel with 17 bedrooms plus an 18-hole golf course, the hotel arm of Celtic Manor Hotel opened in 1982, though the golf courses were delayed until the 1990s. During that decade, the group added a three-storey extension which expanded capacity to 70 bedrooms. From 1983 to 1987, it received the Egon Ronay Guide awards for the best hotel in Wales for five consecutive years.

In 1991 plans were unveiled to develop two new golf courses and a convention centre on land between the Manor House and the River Usk. Matthews had become friends with the late golf-course architect Robert Trent Jones whose family roots were in Aberystwyth. Work began on the Roman Road course in 1992 – named after the nearby historical road connecting the former Roman fortress of Caerleon with the town of Caerwent. By 1994, work had commenced on the 400-bedroom Resort Hotel, as well as a £10-million golf clubhouse and the 4,000-yard (3,700 m) Coldra Woods golf course.

The new development was completed and opened in 1999, adding 330 rooms. The former Celtic Manor Hotel was renamed "The Manor House" to distinguish it from the new "Resort Hotel".

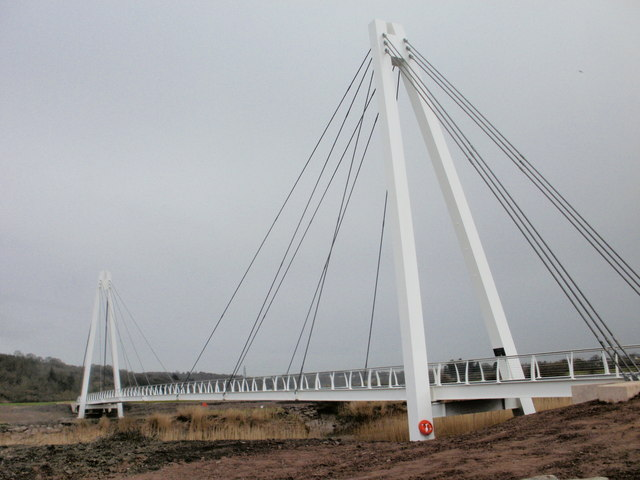
The Twenty Ten Bridge

In 2001, the Resort won the bid to host the 2010 Ryder Cup. To prepare, The Twenty Ten Course, designed by Ross McMurray, was built as part of a £16 million development, the first golf course to be purpose-built for the event. The development included a 120-metre-long £2m twin-suspension bridge, the course and a new clubhouse and surrounding infrastructure, which was promised as part of the bid. The new bridge, The Twenty Ten Bridge, links the practice ground to the golf course across the River Usk and was officially opened by the First Minister of Wales, Carwyn Jones.

In 2019 the Twenty Ten Bridge was closed to the public in the form of two high sided gates. The Resort stated that any users accessing the bridge would be at risk of being hit by stray golf balls, due to the bridge being built next to the driving range. The closure has left the village of Caerleon with no pathway access to the Resort and its facilities, requiring patrons to take vehicular transport.

=== 2010 archaeological and heritage site ===
In July 2010 a dispute arose between Matthews and Newport City Council which refused permission for Matthews to demolish or move a ruined Grade-II listed building from a position overlooking the 18th green. The farmhouse, which dated from 1630, was described by Matthews as "damaging to the image of the entire nation". The Society for the Protection of Ancient Buildings said: "The problematic situation is entirely of the owner’s own making and refusal to safeguard the listed building over many years. It cannot be right to reward this by agreeing to a proposal to simply move a listed building out of the way."

It being known that a Roman settlement had been located at Great Bulmore, the Glamorgan-Gwent Archaeological Trust was appointed by the Celtic Manor Resort to oversee archaeological considerations prior to the course construction. The Trust worked closely with the designers to ensure the preservation of historic material and features. When a Roman pottery kiln was found during the construction of one of the greens, the green was redesigned to avoid it.

While as much as possible of the potential archaeology was identified at the design stage, watching briefs were carried out during construction, since other structures might be discovered. As a result, construction work was halted in sensitive areas to give time to excavate features, including a second Roman pottery kiln with a probable workshop building and a Roman drying kiln.

On the site of the new coach park, a small square tower-like building was found well to the north of any Roman activity previously discovered. It lay alongside a lightly metalled track, that must have branched off the Caerleon to Usk road. There has been some argument as to whether it was military—a Roman watch tower (Castellum) for example—or whether it was a mausoleum where someone of importance had been buried. In the rubble that overlay the building were two pieces of an inscription, with a few letters on each. They were found to fit together, and Roger Tomlin of the University of Oxford interpreted them as part of a verse referring to 'unjust fate', which could support the mausoleum theory.

=== Modern day and event hosting ===
The Wales Open was played at the site from 2000 to 2014 until the event was canceled, and once again in 2020 due to a COVID19-induced European tour revamp. In 2010, the resort hosted the 2010 Ryder Cup. The resort hosted a special stage during the 2012 Wales Rally GB. In 2014, the resort hosted the 2014 NATO summit.

In June 2012, Matthews and the hotel announced a £160M 10-year plan for developing the hotel as a resort. Creating 230 new permanent jobs, and 700 in construction and supply during the development, the additions were to include 10 luxury 5-star chalets, 40 luxury hill-top apartments, and Europe's longest zip-line attraction.

During the COVID-19 pandemic, the Celtic Collection Group announced plans to lay off about 450 of its 995 full time staff. In response, local politicians and community members sent a letter urging Matthews, by then a billionaire, to "do whatever you can to save these jobs, even if it means using your own considerable personal fortune to do so."

== Resort facilities ==
The resort has placed in lists of popular wedding destinations and beautiful hotels. It features a large number of restaurants. Other amenities on site include the golf courses, a golf training academy, health clubs, a spa, a shopping centre, tennis courts, and mountain biking and nature trails. Off site, there is Lazer clay-pigeon shooting and fishing.

=== ICC Wales ===
The delegate conference suite has an exhibition hall and 40 function rooms. It has a 1,500-seat auditorium with 4,000 square metres of exhibition space, which is able to accommodate up to 2,700 guests opened in 2019. Opened in September 2019, it is a joint venture partnership with the Welsh Government. It has a total capacity of 4,000 delegates.

== Golf ==
Celtic Manor Resort
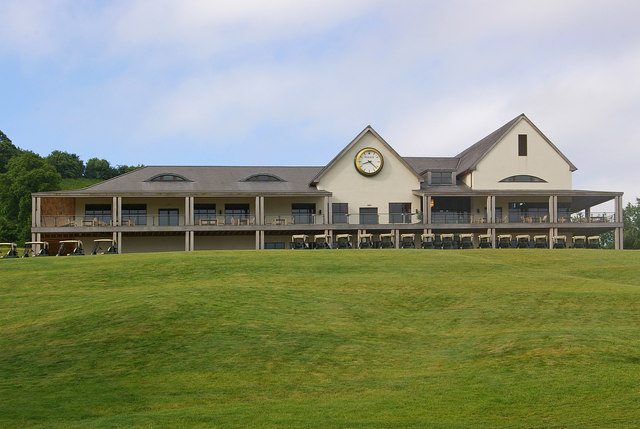
- The Twenty Ten clubhouse
- Interactive map of Celtic Manor Resort

Club information
- Location: Newport, South Wales
- Established: 1994
- Type: Private
- Owner: Terry Matthews
- Tota holes: 54
- Tournaments: 2010 Ryder Cup, Celtic Manor Wales Open
- Website: www.celtic-manor.com/golf.aspx

The Twenty Ten Course
- Designed by: Ross McMurray
- Par: 71
- Length: 7,493 yards

The Montgomerie Course
- Designed by: Colin Montgomerie
- Par: 69
- Length: 6,371 yards

Roman Road Course
- Designed by: Robert Trent Jones
- Par: 69
- Length: 6,600 yards

=== 2010 Ryder Cup ===
In 2001 the resort won its bid to host the 2010 Ryder Cup. As a result, much of the Wentwood Hills course was redeveloped into the Ryder Cup's first purpose-built venue; the "Twenty Ten" Course. An additional clubhouse built specifically for the Twenty Ten course was completed and opened in autumn 2007. The opening of the Ryder Cup, which ran from 27 September until 4 October 2010, saw a visit from Charles, Prince of Wales. Europe won the trophy by 14½ – 13½ points.

=== 2000 PGA Cup ===
In 2000 Celtic Manor hosted the PGA Cup, the biennial contest between club professionals from Great Britain and Ireland against the United States. The USA won 13½ – 12½.

=== Defunct courses ===
- Wentwood Hills – Opened in 1999 and was the venue for the Celtic Manor Wales Open, on the European Tour from 2000 to 2004. So some of the holes form part of the Montgomerie course and others the 2010.
- Coldra Woods – a par-59 academy course for beginners that opened in 1996 and was replaced by The Montgomerie in July 2007.

=== Current courses ===
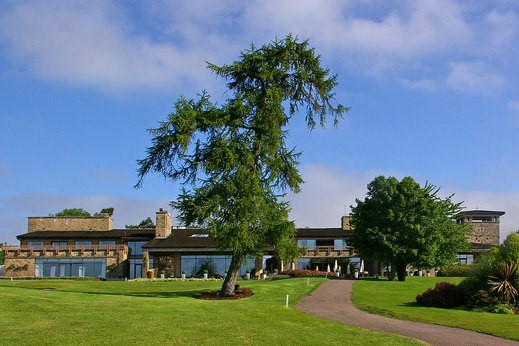
The Lodge, clubhouse for the Roman Road and Montgomerie golf courses

- The Twenty Ten – It was designed by Ross McMurray. Wentwood Hills has been extensively remodelled for the 2010 Ryder Cup Matches, making the new version the first course to be purpose-built for the biennial transatlantic tournament. Opened in 2007, the resultant course comprises nine pre-existing holes from the Wentwood Hills course and nine new ones. The layout is designed to allow large galleries to conveniently follow the small number of concurrent matches which are played during the Ryder Cup. The course has only one fairway crossing, and there are open views of the 16th, 17th and 18th holes, which are situated in an amphitheatre. The spectator capacity is 50,000. The course hosted the Wales Open tournament prior to the Ryder Cup.
- Roman Road – opened in 1994. This par-70 championship course hosted the Wales Open in 2005, 2006 and 2007 during the conversion of Wentwood Hills into the Twenty Ten course.
- The Montgomerie – this is a par-69 course designed by Colin Montgomerie that opened in July 2007. The course incorporates elements of both Coldra Woods and Wentwood Hills.

== See also ==
- List of golf courses in the United Kingdom
