= Cardiff Castle Stables =

Stables in Cardiff, Wales

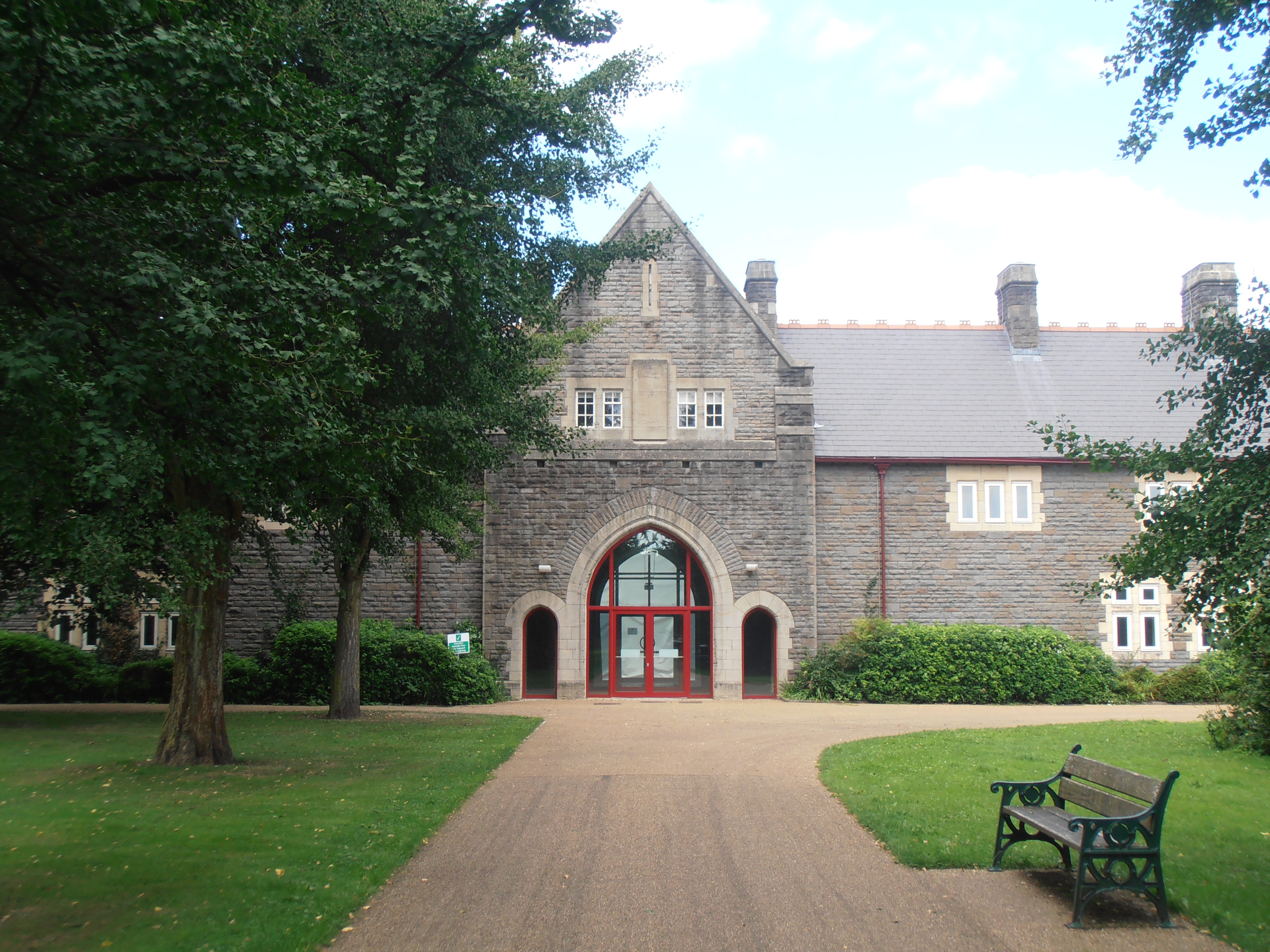
- The stables, now the Anthony Hopkins Centre

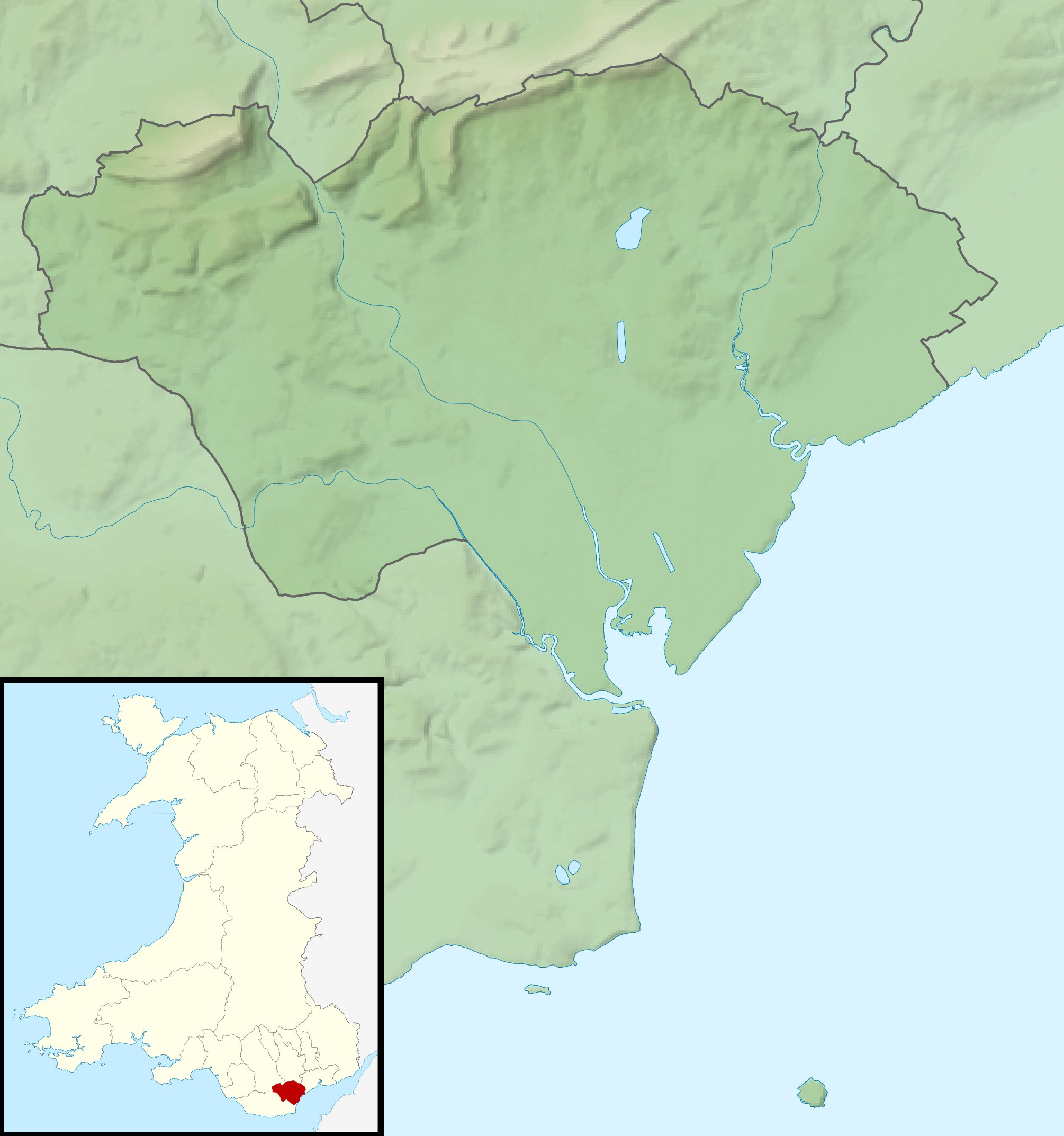
- Location within Cardiff
- 51.4852°N 3.1834°W
- Type: Stables
- Location: Cardiff, Wales

History
- Built: 1868-1875 (completed 1928-1929)

Site notes
- Architect: William Burges
- Architectural style: Victorian
- Governing body: Royal Welsh College of Music & Drama

Listed Building – Grade II*
- Official name: Stables to Cardiff Castle in Bute Park
- Designated: 25 January 1966
- Reference no.: 13764

Cardiff Castle Stables, Cardiff, Wales, were designed in 1868-69 by the Gothic revivalist architect William Burges. They stand to the north of Cardiff Castle and on the western edge of Cathays Park which then formed part of the castle’s private grounds. Work on the stables continued into the 1870s, and they were not completed until 1928-29. One of only two stable blocks designed by Burges, they now accommodate the Anthony Hopkins Centre, part of the Royal Welsh College of Music & Drama. The stables are a Grade II* listed building.

== History ==
In 1865, Burges met John Patrick Crichton-Stuart, 3rd Marquess of Bute. This may have resulted from Alfred Burges's engineering firm, Walker, Burges and Cooper, having undertaken work on the East Bute Docks in Cardiff for the second Marquess. (Note: Pauline Sargent, a member of the South Glamorgan County Architects department and curator of an exhibition of Burges drawings and stained glass cartoons held at Cardiff Castle from July to August 1977 suggests that John (James) McConnochie may have made the introduction. McConnochie was employed by Burges, Walker and Cooper, Burges's father's firm, and subsequently worked for Bute as Chief Engineer at Cardiff Docks.) The 3rd Marquess became Burges's greatest architectural patron; both were men of their times; both had fathers whose industrial endeavours provided the means for their sons' architectural achievements, and both sought to "redeem the evils of industrialism by re-living the art of the Middle Ages".

It forms an entire quadrangle, entered by gateways on opposite sides. A fountain, which, if it would not frighten the horses, would certainly form an effective feature, occupies the centre, and the inevitable turret, dedicated to pigeons, sticks up at one corner, but hardly so as to gather the group together as well as it should. [Still], the design is one we should be glad to see carried out.

— Building News (1870)

The building of the stables formed part of the reconstruction of Cardiff Castle and they were designed by Burges in 1868-69. Construction took place between 1872-75 but they were not completed until 1928-29. They are reputedly one of only two sets of stables Burges ever designed; (Note: The other stables Burges built were at Knightshayes Court in Devon.) neither he, nor Bute, were much interested in horses. (Note: While the Marquess, unusually for his class and time, was uninterested in riding, and strongly opposed fox hunting, his wife, Gwendolen Mary Angela Fitzalan-Howard, was a keen carriage driver.) Nevertheless, the stables formed an essential component of the large-scale Victorian country house into which they jointly transformed the castle.

After the Second World War, the stables housed the parks department of Cardiff City Council. In the 1960s a long lease was given to the Royal Welsh College of Music & Drama. The college had originally been accommodated within the castle itself. Following the construction of a new campus immediately to the north of the stables in 1974, (Note: The college campus saw a further, major, redevelopment in the early 21st century.) the stables themselves were converted to the Anthony Hopkins centre which opened in 1999. The Welsh-born Hopkins studied at the Royal Welsh College and is now its vice-president.

== Architecture and description ==
The stables are constructed in stone with a roof of Welsh slate, and designed to a quadrangular plan. Wooden galleries surround the interior. The builder was Albert Estcourt of Gloucester. (Note: Albert Estcourt was much favoured by Burges and Bute; in addition to the stables, he also received the building contracts for Castell Coch and the Swiss Bridge in Bute Park.) Access to the castle was by way of a carriage tunnel. The pigeon tower referenced by the Building News was demolished in the 1950s, and there is debate as to whether the fountain Burges planned for the centre of the quadrangle was ever built; no trace of it remains. John B. Hilling, in his 2016 study Black Gold, White City: The history and architecture of Cardiff Civic Centre, considered Burges's design to be uncharacteristically "sober". The stables are designated a Grade II* listed building.

== Sources ==
- Crook, J. Mordaunt (1981). The Strange Genius of William Burges. Cardiff: Amgueddfa Cymru – Museum Wales. ISBN 978-0-720-00259-1.
- — (2013). William Burges and the High Victorian Dream. London: Frances Lincoln. ISBN 978-0-711-23349-2.
- Hilling, John B. (2016). The History and Architecture of Cardiff Civic Centre. Cardiff: University of Wales Press. ISBN 978-1-78316-842-2.
- John, Angela V. (2015). The Actor's Crucible: Port Talbot and the Making of Burton, Hopkins, Sheen and All the Others. Cardigan, Wales: Parthian Books. ISBN 978-1-910-90141-0.
- Newman, John (2001). Glamorgan. The Buildings of Wales. London: Penguin Books. ISBN 978-0-300-09629-3.
- Sargent, Pauline (1977). Catalogue of the Exhibition of Drawings from the Cardiff Castle Collection (1). Cardiff City Council. OCLC 913363590.
- Williams, Matthew (2004). William Burges. Norwich, UK: Jarrold Publishing. ISBN 9-78184-165139-2.
- — (2019). Cardiff Castle and the Marquesses of Bute. London: Scala Arts & Heritage Publishers Ltd. ISBN 978-1-785-51234-6. OCLC 1097577215.
