= Mary Silyn Roberts =

Welsh activist (1877–1972)

- Born: 1877; Mold
- Died: 1972
- Spouse: R. Silyn Roberts

Mary Silyn Roberts MBE (née Parry; 1877–1972) was a Welsh activist for peace, adult education, and women's suffrage.

Born in Mold and raised in London, she studied and lectured at Aberystwyth University. She married R. Silyn Roberts in 1905, and they moved to Tanygrisau. She was involved with the Women's Suffrage Movement, Wales' Women's Land Army and WEA North Wales. In 1926, she co-organised a peace march from Penygroes to London. She was awarded an MBE in 1947.

== Early life ==
Mary Parry was born in Mold in Flintshire in 1877, and was raised in London. As a child, she won a scholarship to study in Denmark.

She was educated at Aberystwyth, and became one of the first women to earn a degree from Aberystwyth University.

== Career ==
Prior to her marriage, Mary Parry was a lecturer at Aberystwyth, and, in 1904 and 1905, she studied adult education in Denmark. She stopped working after marrying R. Silyn Roberts in 1905, and moved back to North Wales, where she lived in Tanygrisau.

Prior to 1914, she was involved in the Women's Suffrage Movement.

She knew Ellen Evans and Annie Ffoulkes and may have had a hand in Ellen becoming a Welsh lecturer at Glamorgan Training College, Barry.

During World War I, she was an agricultural organiser for Wales' Women's Land Army, giving talks to encourage women to grow more food.

She wanted to provide education to quarrymen in the area around Blaenau Ffestiniog, so, in 1925, along with her husband, she founded the North Wales branch of the Workers' Educational Association, and her husband took on the role as secretary.

She was a peace campaigner and acted as the honourable secretary of the Women's International League for Peace and Freedom. In 1926, Mary Silyn Roberts, Gladys Thoday and Charlotte Price White organised a peace march from Penygroes to London, leading the North Wales contingent joining 10,000 women in Hyde Park, and giving a speech in Welsh.

After her husband's death in 1930, she took over the role of district organisational secretary of the North Wales Committee of the WEA, which included arranging lecturers to teach in the schoolhouse. She was secretary until 1945. She continued working to provide education for society until 1960.

She was awarded an MBE as part of the 1947 King's Birthday Honours appointments.

== Personal life ==
She married R. Silyn Roberts in 1905. They had three children: two sons and a daughter.

== Death ==
Mary Silyn Roberts died in 1972.

== Legacy ==
In 2019, a memorial to Mary and her husband was unveiled at their home in Tanygrisiau.

Mary's papers, including letters and notebooks from her university studies, are held in the Bangor University archives.
