= Merthyr Tydfil College =

Further education college in Wales

Coordinates: 51.7455°N 3.3830°W

Merthyr Tydfil College (Welsh: Y Coleg Merthyr Tudful) is a further education college located in Merthyr Tydfil, Wales. From May 2006 to April 2013, it was a constituent college of the University of Glamorgan and thereafter, a college of the University of South Wales.

Previously, the college was an independent institution, but became part of the University of Glamorgan Group in May 2006. Although it is a constituent college of the university, Merthyr Tydfil College is not officially part of the university. It is run by the University of South Wales as a separate organisation, incorporated as a company limited by guarantee owned by the university in 2008, primarily focused on offering further education to the local community in Merthyr Tydfil.

The college provides a range of courses to students from the local area, including GCSEs, A Levels, BTECs, Apprenticeships and Access courses. Merthyr Tydfil College also offers a limited provision of higher education courses in conjunction with the University of South Wales.

== Campus and facilities ==
The college underwent major redevelopment with the construction of a new tertiary campus, completed in 2012. In June 2021, the college opened an on-site esports gaming suite to support digital learning and competitive play.

== Student life and outcomes ==
The college has reported consistently strong A Level results, including a 99% overall pass rate in 2024.

In 2025, one of its students was awarded a scholarship to study golf in the United States, reflecting the college’s sporting and academic pathways.

== Esports ==
The college supports an official esports team, the Tydfil Titans, which competes in the UK-wide British Esports Student Champs, organised by British Esports. The team has also participated in the Welsh Esports Cup organised by Esports Wales, reaching the finals of the 2025 Valorant competition against Gower College Swansea.

The esports programme is integrated into the college’s creative and digital curriculum and promotes inclusion, teamwork and career pathways in the esports industry.

== Incidents ==
In September 2025, a man was arrested and charged after posting a video online threatening students at the college. The incident led to a temporary increase in security on campus.

== Gallery ==
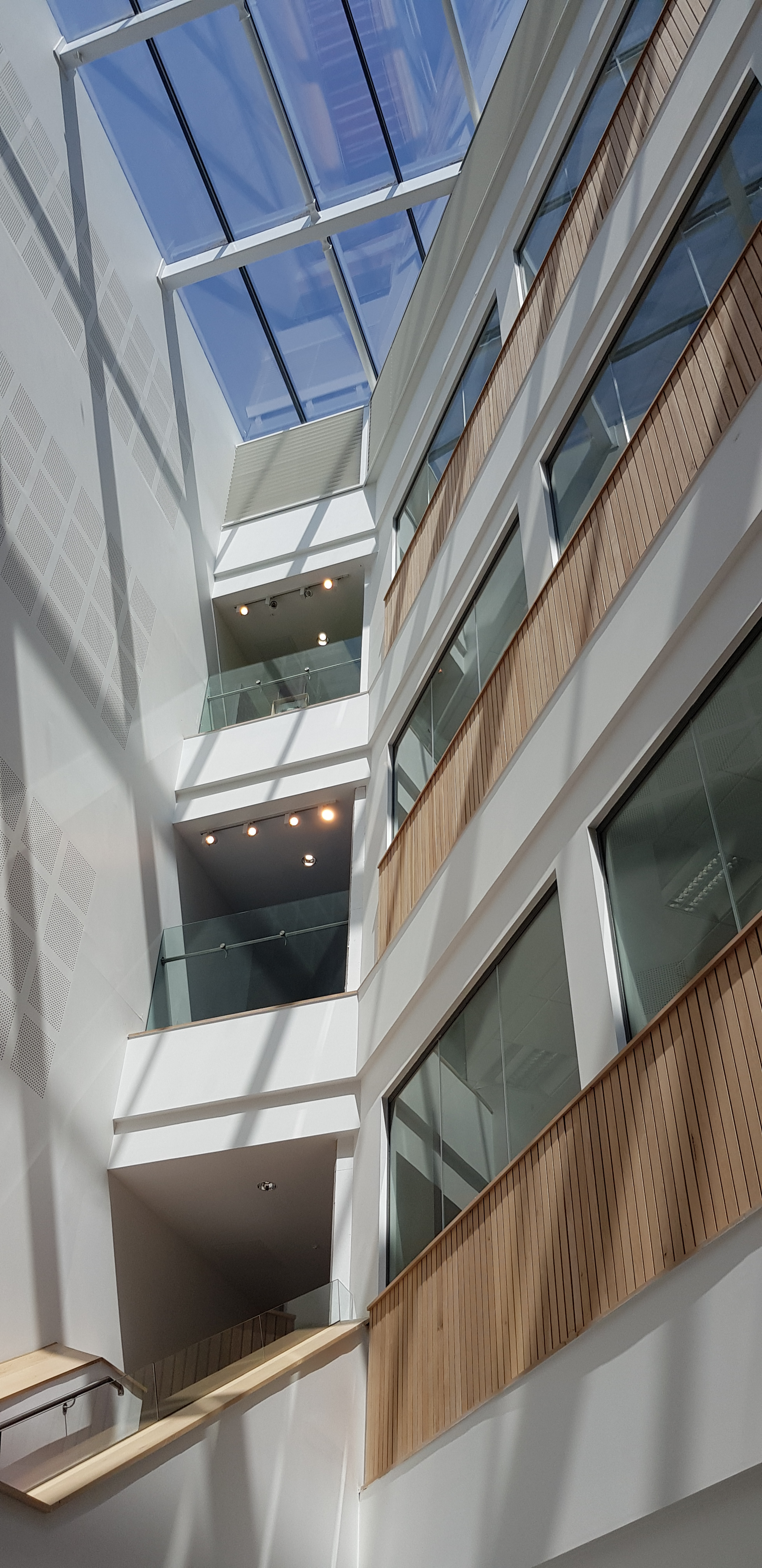

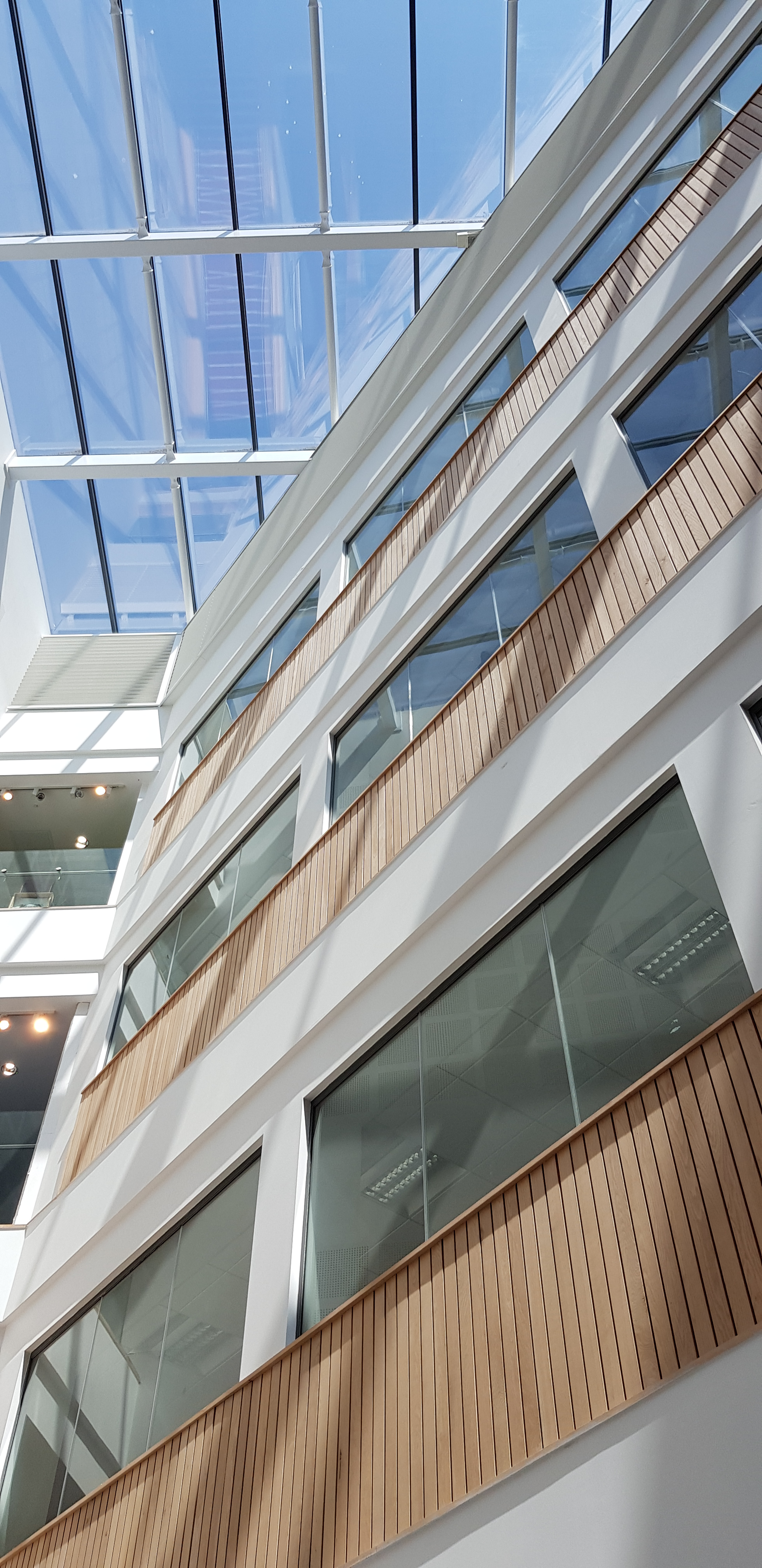

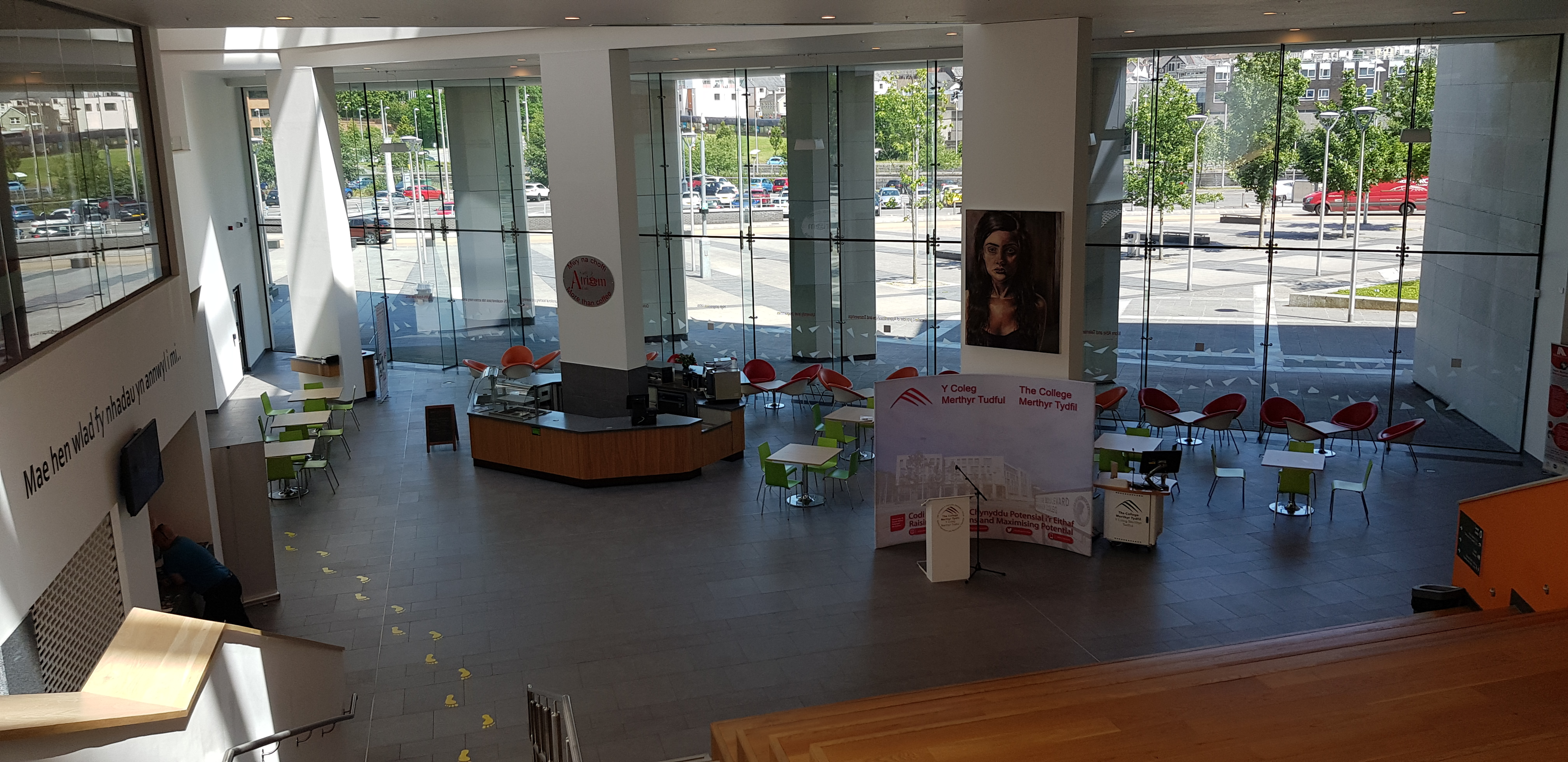

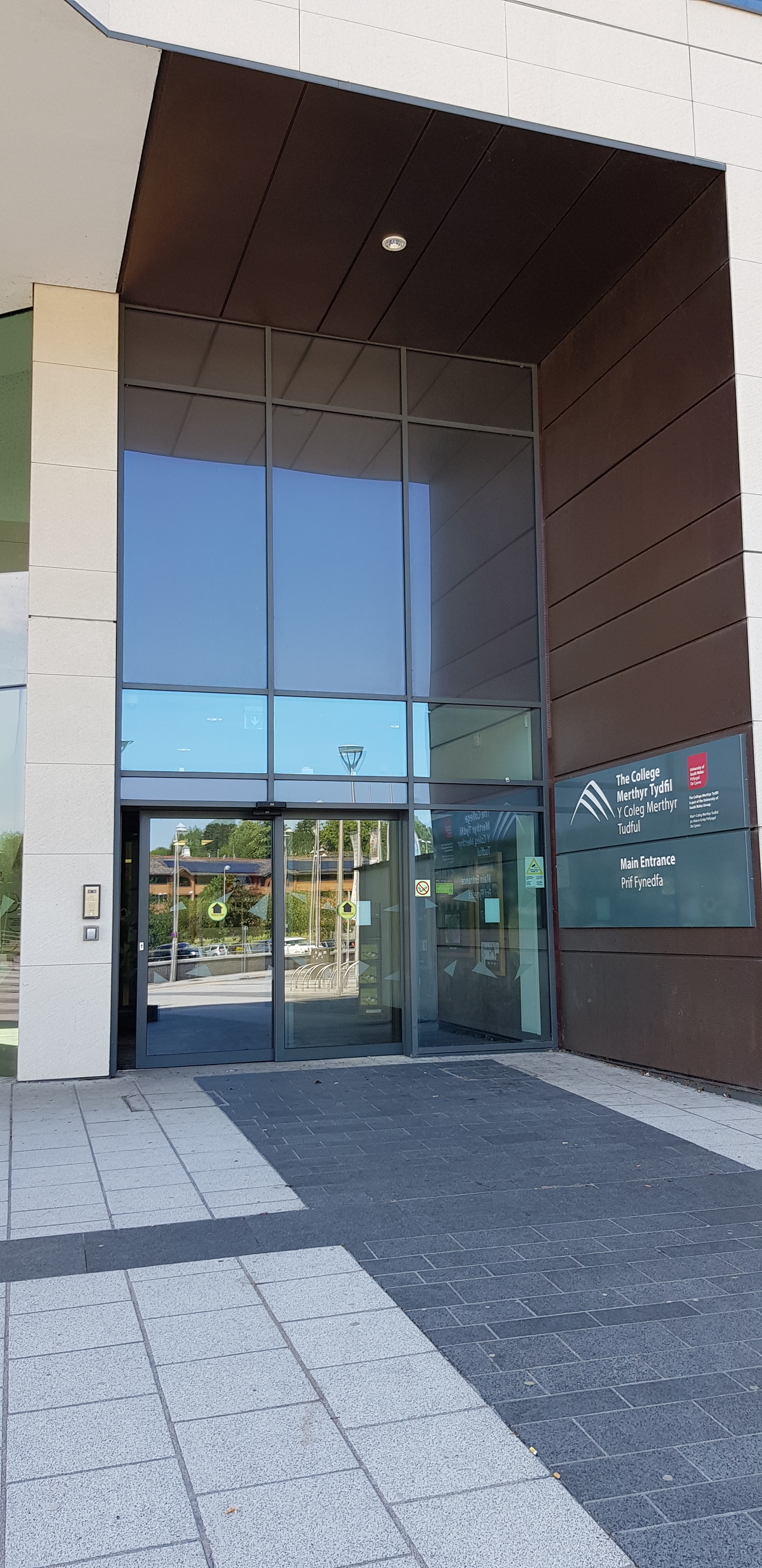

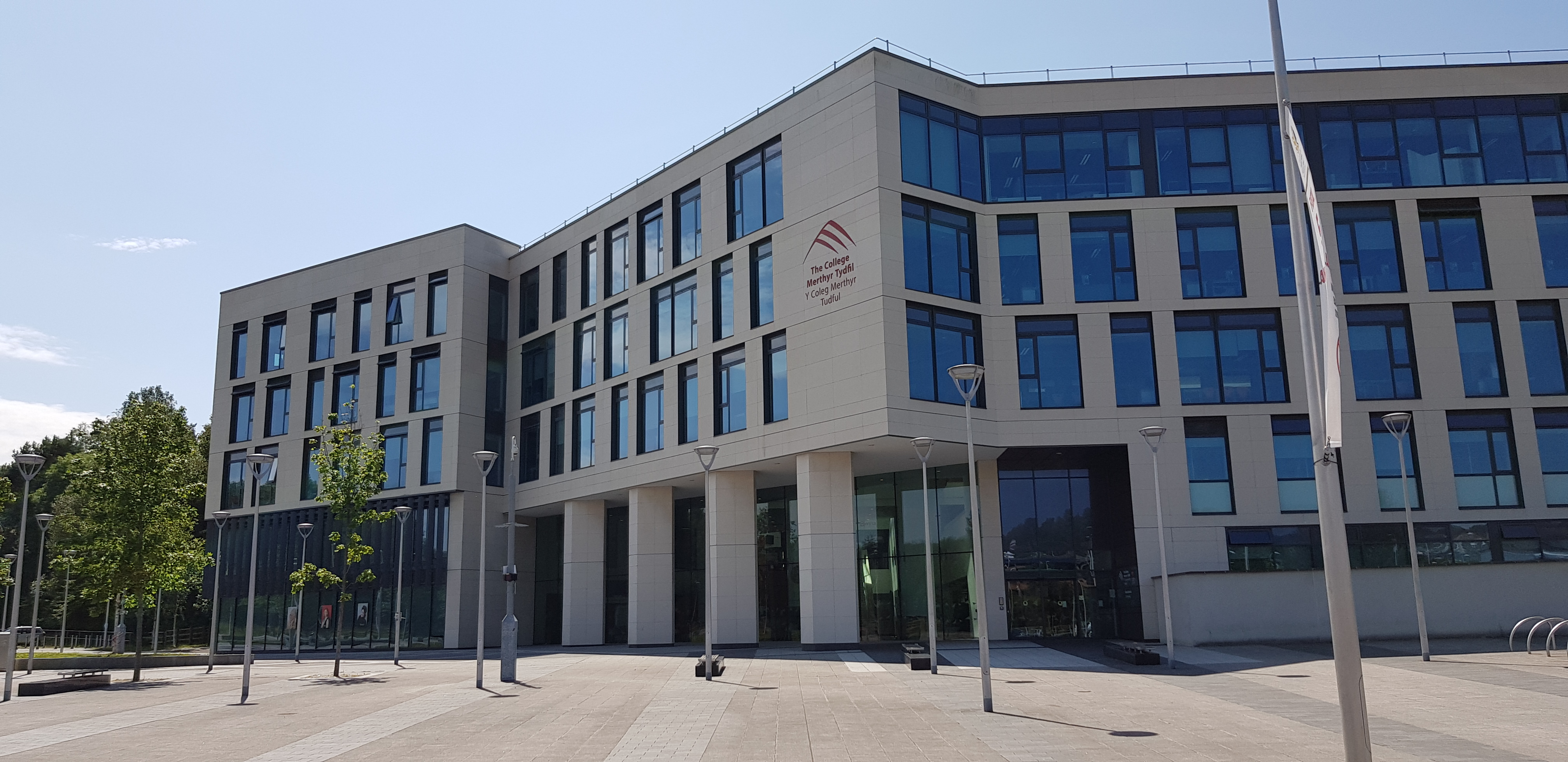

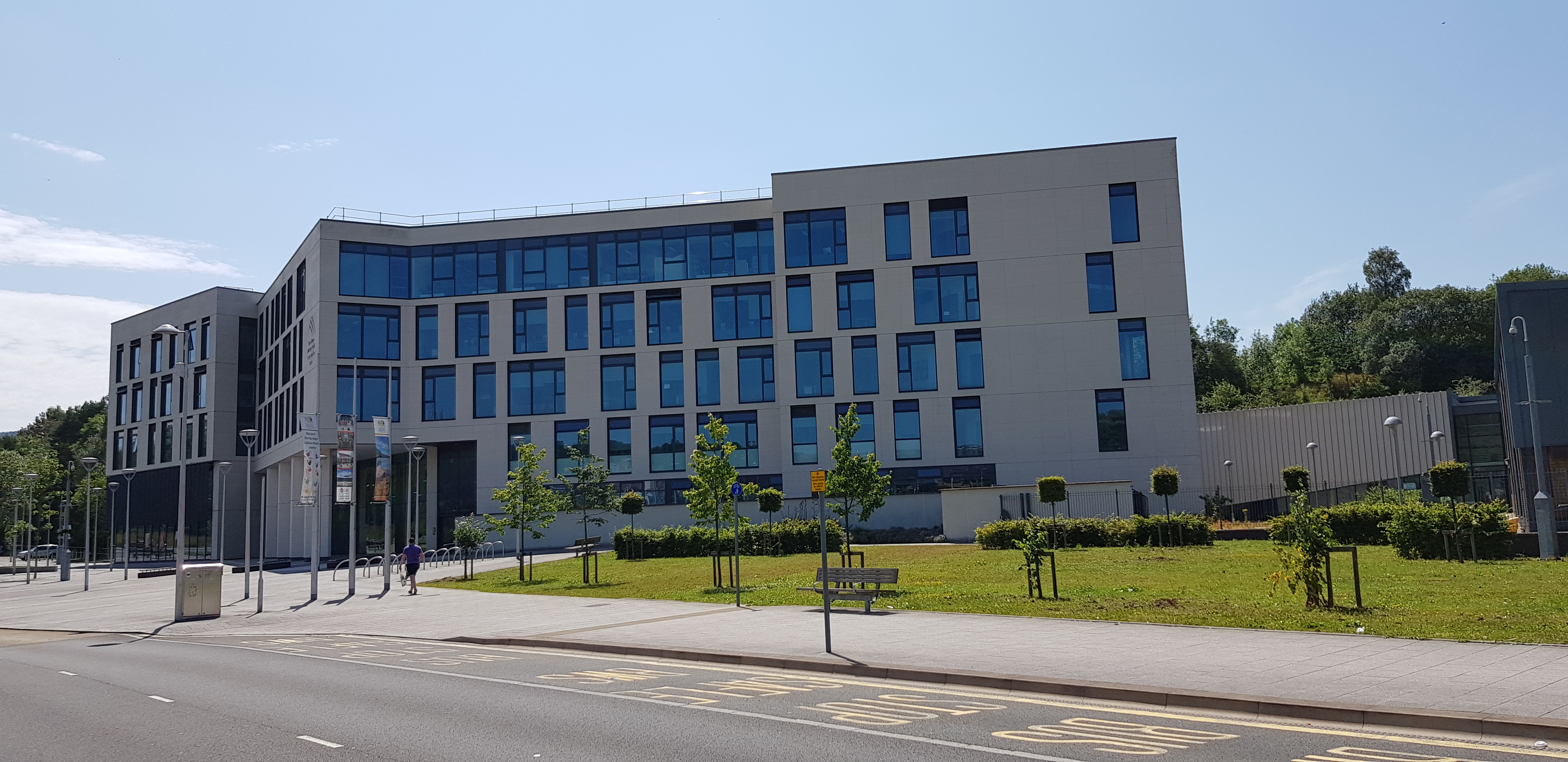

== Notable alumni ==
- Gerrion Jones, art collector
