= Joe Blackman =

British businessman

Joe Blackman MBE
- Joe Blackman in 2026.
- Born: 6 August 1984 (age 42); Cardiff
- Education: University of South Wales (MBA)
- Occupations: Entrepreneur, event planner, business advisor
- Known for: Founder of Collection 26
- Honours: Order of the British Empire
- Website: https://joe-blackman.com

Joe Blackman MBE (born 6 August 1984) is a Welsh entrepreneur and event planner whose work has included planning global events, business consulting, international trade and citizen diplomacy.

He founded the luxury event-planning company Collection 26 (formerly called Green Ant Events) in 2005, later relocating it to London, which organised events for private and corporate clients in the United Kingdom and Internationally. Blackman sold the business in 2017.

Following the sale, he continued to produce international events alongside consultancy and mentoring, and joined the boards of the British American Business Council and Sister Cities International.

Blackman was appointed as a magistrate in Cardiff aged 23, becoming the youngest Justice of the Peace on the Cardiff bench and one of the youngest magistrates in the United Kingdom.

He was appointed Member of the Order of the British Empire (MBE) by Queen Elizabeth II in 2022 New Year Honours for services to the economy and charity.

== Early life and education ==
Blackman grew up in Llantwit Major, in the Vale of Glamorgan, Wales, with a younger brother and sister and was raised by his mother.

His mother, Jane Blackman, worked at St Donat's Arts Centre, where she was involved in organising events including the Beyond the Border Storytelling Festival.

Blackman began helping at events at St Donat's while still a child and subsequently learned aspects of concert lighting and event management there.

By the time he left school after completing his A-levels, Blackman had progressed to event management responsibilities at Beyond the Border Storytelling Festival which attracted approximately 10,000 visitors.

At the age of 19, he worked on events including Party in the Park in Cardiff and the Brecon Jazz Festival.

At around the same age, Blackman helped organise a birthday party for rapper 50 Cent while the performer was appearing at Cardiff International Arena. He worked freelance there helping produce Tsunami Relief Cardiff and Live 8.

Blackman originally studied a BA degree in Stage Management at the Royal Welsh College of Music & Drama before leaving to work on the 2006 Asian Games in Qatar. He subsequently graduated from the University of South Wales with as a Master of Business Administration. He is qualified in health and safety management by NEBOSH.

== Career ==
=== Early career ===
In 2005, aged 20, Blackman founded Green Ant Events, an event planning company based in Cardiff that was later renamed Collection 26.

The business originally received support from Venture Wales, a Welsh Government backed business support programme.

Blackman's early professional work included the 2006 Asian Games in Doha, Qatar for International Olympic Committee. He helped manage the opening ceremony and medal presentations, and worked on aquatics events. Contracts made while working in Qatar subsequently contributed to his early business growth.

In 2007, the company secured a contract to manage festival production for Africa Oyé in Liverpool, with over 60,000 attendees, as an early major client.

During the financial crisis of 2008, Blackman decided to shift focus towards luxury private events for high net worth clients, including footballers, musicians and royal family members .

In 2010, due to business expansion, Blackman relocated the company from Cardiff to Notting Hill, London, to be closer to its clients and venues.

The company rebranded and was renamed Collection 26 in 2013.

Collection 26 continued its business expansion, organising private and corporate events throughout the United Kingdom and internationally. Its reported projects included events for musicians 50 Cent, Ed Sheeran, Coldplay, The Killers, Premier League footballers and members of the Abu Dhabi and Saudi Arabian Royal Families.

Blackman sold Collection 26 in 2017 for an undisclosed sum.

=== Later career ===
Following the sale of Collection 26, Blackman continued to produce events internationally while broadening his business activities to include entrepreneurship, consultancy and mentoring. He has advised businesses and entrepreneurs on growth and expansion, including mentoring young entrepreneurs through the King's Trust.

After relocating to Texas in 2020, Blackman became increasingly involved in organisations promoting international business and trade links between the United Kingdom and the United States. He served on the board of directors of the British American Business Council.

Blackman also became involved in citizen diplomacy, joining the board of directors of Austin Sister Cities International in 2024. In 2025 he was elected to the board of Sister Cities International, a non-profit organisation founded by President Dwight D. Eisenhower in 1956, and was subsequently appointed to its executive committee and made a UK Country Representative.

== Judicial service ==
Blackman was appointed a magistrate in Cardiff aged 23, becoming one of the youngest magistrates on the Cardiff bench, and one of the youngest in Wales and the United Kingdom.

He said that he applied after learning about the role from a friend who was already a magistrate. He cited an interest in becoming more involved in the community and in having people of different ages and backgrounds represented on the bench.

He was sworn in at Cardiff Crown Court before the Recorder of Cardiff.

== Honors ==
Blackman was appointed Member of the Order of the British Empire (MBE) in the 2022 New Year Honours for services to the economy and charity.
