= University of Glamorgan =

Former university in Wales

Coordinates: 51°35′21″N 3°19′38″W

- Welsh: Prifysgol Morgannwg
- University of Glamorgan coat of arms
- Former names: Glamorgan Technical College (1949–1958), Glamorgan College of Technology (1958–1970), Glamorgan Polytechnic (1970–1975), Glamorgan College of Education, Polytechnic of Wales (1975–1992)
- Motto: Success Through Endeavour
- Type: Public
- Active: 1913–2013
- Students: 21,496
- Undergraduates: 18,240
- Postgraduates: 3,256
- Location: Trefforest, Wales, UK
- Website: https://glamorganuniversity.org/
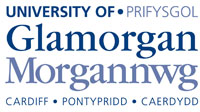

The University of Glamorgan (Welsh: Prifysgol Morgannwg) was a public university based in South Wales, that merged with University of Wales, Newport to form the University of South Wales in April 2013. The university was based in Pontypridd, in Rhondda Cynon Taf, with campuses in Trefforest, Glyntaff, Merthyr Tydfil, Tyn y Wern (The Glamorgan Sport Park) and Cardiff. The university had four faculties and was the only university in Wales which had no link with the University of Wales.

The university was founded in 1913 as the South Wales and Monmouthshire School of Mines, serving the large coal mining industry in the South Wales Valleys.

== History ==
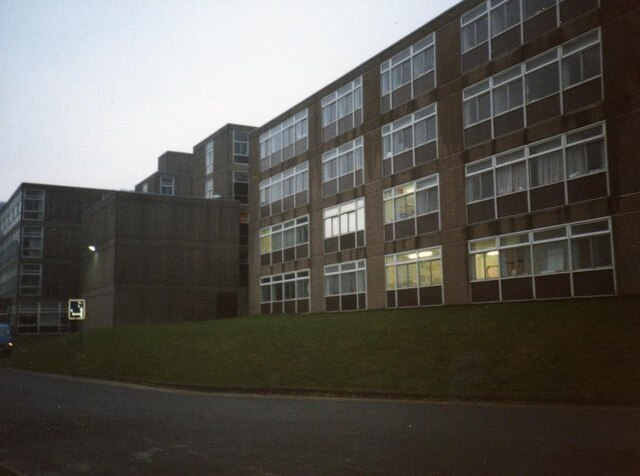
Polytechnic of Wales in 1986

The University of Glamorgan was founded in 1913 as the South Wales and Monmouthshire School of Mines, a School of Mines based in Trefforest, Pontypridd, serving the large coal mining industry in the South Wales Valleys. The school was owned and funded by the major Welsh coal owners, through a levy of one tenth of a penny on each ton of coal produced by the companies involved. At the outset, the school had 17 mining diploma students, including three from China. The school was taken over by Glamorgan County Council during the Depression, and became Glamorgan Technical College in 1949, reflecting its expanding portfolio, and the Glamorgan College of Technology in 1958. By this time, the institution had expanded to offer a range of full-time, sandwich and part-time courses in science, technology and commerce, to which it added the first "Welsh for Adults" course in 1967. In 1970, the college became a polytechnic.

In 1914 Glamorgan County Council created Glamorgan Training College to train women to teach. It originally only took women who lived locally but in 1947, when Ellen Evans was the principal, it became co-educational and in 1962 it also accepted male students. Three years later it changed its name to Glamorgan College of Education.

The Glamorgan College of Education in Barry merged with Glamorgan Polytechnic merged and it was re-named the Polytechnic of Wales in 1975, before being awarded university status as the University of Glamorgan in 1992.

Between 2003 and 2013, the university engaged in an active growth strategy by merging with Merthyr Tydfil College in 2004/5 and forming a strategic alliance with the Royal Welsh College of Music and Drama in 2006, so that the Royal College became part of the 'Glamorgan Group' of institutions. In 2007, "ATRiuM", a new facility for teaching and research in media, design and the arts was opened in Cardiff city centre. A new Students' Union building at the Treforest Campus was opened in September 2010.

=== Merger ===
In July 2012 the University of Glamorgan and the University of Wales, Newport, announced that they had begun talks aimed at integrating the two institutions. On 17 December 2012 it was announced that the new university would be called the University of South Wales. The university at the time of the merger served around 21,500 students, with 10,227 registered as full-time undergraduates. The university offered around 200 courses and in 2009 claimed to have one of the highest graduate employment rates in Wales, reporting that 94.3% of 2007-08 graduates found employment within six months of graduation.

== Campuses ==
The university had several campuses:

- Trefforest - the main campus with the majority of academic departments and facilities, including the indoor sports centre and students union.
- Glyntaff - housed the Faculty of Health, Sport and Science. Science and Sport subjects were based here, including Police Sciences and Nursing.
- Partner colleges - The university had specialised "partner colleges" throughout South Wales; for example, Barry College for aeronautical engineering.
- Merthyr Tydfil - Merthyr Tydfil College became part of the University of Glamorgan Group (but not part of the university), although focused on delivering Further Education rather than Higher Education.
- Tyn y Wern - home to the Glamorgan Sport Park.
- ATRiuM - The Cardiff School of Creative and Cultural Industries was based at a Cardiff campus located close to Cardiff Queen Street railway station.

=== Facilities ===
The following halls of residence were based at the Treforest campus:

- Glamorgan Court - Built in 1994, with all the rooms in the hall buildings arranged into clusters of six en-suite bedrooms with a shared kitchen.
- Mountain Halls Accommodation blocks opened in September 2011.

Logo of University of Glamorgan Students' Union

The University of Glamorgan Students' Union (Glam SU) was the students' union at the University of Glamorgan, primarily based at the university's Treforest campus. The union was an affiliate of National Union of Students of the United Kingdom and part of NUS Wales. It offered representation, support and services to all the students of the university. The Student Union was the home to a number of sports teams, sports clubs and societies as well as TAG, the student newspaper. The Union has also welfare, education and equality support and there was a democratic structure change to Student Council.

The Oriel Y Bont galleries was an art gallery that hosted a collection of Ernest Zobole paintings. The Learning Resource Centre was the library of the university.

== Faculties and departments ==
- Cardiff School of Creative & Cultural Industries, the Atrium
  - Animation
  - Communication Design
  - Drama
  - Fashion and Retail Design
  - Film, Photography and New Media
  - Media, Culture and Journalism
  - Music and Sound
- Faculty of Health, Sport & Science
  - Astronomy
  - Geography and the Environment
  - Health Sciences including Nursing and Chiropractic
  - Life Sciences
  - Physical Sciences (including Chemistry, Geology and Forensic Science)
  - Police Sciences
  - Social Work
  - Sport

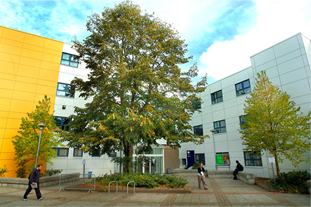
Business School

- Faculty of Business and Society
  - Accounting
  - Art Practice
  - Business Management
  - English and Creative Writing
  - Event Management
  - History
  - Humanities and Social Sciences
  - Law and Criminology
  - Psychology
- Faculty of Advanced Technology
  - Aerospace
  - Built Environment
  - Computing and Mathematics
  - Engineering
  - Lighting and Live Event Technology

== Academic profile ==
=== Rankings and reputation ===
The last rankings showed that the University of Glamorgan was rated the top "new" university in Wales, and one of the top five Welsh universities, by the Sunday Times.

- One of only 20 UK business schools to get "excellent ratings" from the government.
- A £35 million investment in the city of Cardiff, completed in 2007, housed the Atrium.
- Glamorgan, in partnership with the University of Wales Newport, is leading the development of the University of the Heads of the Valleys Initiative (UHOVI)

=== Awards ===
- Glamorgan was the first university in Wales, and only the 8th in the UK (in 2007), to have been awarded the nationally recognised Investor in People status, for staff training and development.
- The Business School received Chartered Institute of Purchasing & Supply Centre of Excellence accreditation, being one of only 13 accredited centres in the UK.

== Notable alumni ==
- Jayde Adams, comedian
- Mark Andrews, wrestler
- Sue Bale
- Max Boyce
- Kevin Brennan, politician
- Carole Bromley
- Richard James Burgess
- Roger Clark, American actor, the voice and motion capture of Arthur Morgan in Red Dead Redemption 2
- Maciej Dakowicz
- Emma Darwin, novelist
- Lorna Dunkley
- Gareth Evans, director
- Jill Evans
- Ben Green, comedian
- Eddie Hughes, politician
- Matthew Jarvis, rugby
- Caroline Jones, UKIP member of the National Assembly for Wales
- Mark Labbett
- Benny Lim
- Nicola Miles-Wildin
- Darren Morris
- Gareth L. Powell
- Dan Rhodes
- Sion Russell Jones
- Catherine Thomas
- Rachel Trezise
- Nigel Walker, athlete
- Camilla Way
- Randii Wessen
- Tine Wittler
- Leanne Wood

== See also ==
- Calvert's Engine, an 1845 colliery beam engine, preserved outside the Trefforest campus, originally the School of Mines.
