= Benny Lim (theatrical producer) =

- Born: 25 April 1980 (age 46); Singapore
- Education: Doctor of Philosophy, University of Glamorgan
- Occupations: Theatre practitioner and educator

Benny Lim (born 25 April 1980) is a Singaporean artist. He was previously the artistic director of the now defunct the Fun Stage, a non-profit theatre group in Singapore.

== Education ==
He obtained a Doctor of Philosophy from the Division of Drama, University of Glamorgan (now known as the University of South Wales) in 2012.

He holds Master's degrees from Libera Accademia di Belle Arti,Guglielmo Marconi University, and the University of Lancashire.

== Career ==
In 2001, at the age of 21, Lim founded the Fun Stage. He served as its artistic director from 2001 to 2010.

In 2006, one of Lim's plays, Existence, was published in Singapore. Existence was written in 2003, inspired by the poetry of Cyril Wong, as a response to Leslie Cheung's suicide. The play was mentioned in Time magazine (10 August 2003) as a story that "portrays the love of two young Singaporean men for each other as doomed". In 2015, Lim co-curated Umbrella Festival, an arts festival in Hong Kong, in response to city's Umbrella Movement.

As of 2026, he is an Associate Professor of Practice at City University of Hong Kong.

== Censorship ==
Lim's works often deal with social-political issues within a postmodern society.

In 2004, Fun Stage organized the Lovers' Lecture Series, a series of talks and forums on gay representation, prefacing their upcoming gay-themed play, Lovers' Words, a Taiwanese play in which a boy and girl fall in love in a society where homosexuality is the norm. The Lovers' Lecture Series was not approved by the Public Entertainment Licensing Unit under the Singapore Police Force. In 2005, Lim collaborated with artist Brian Gothong Tan on a devised play, Human Lefts. The content of the play, which was on the issue of the death penalty, was banned by the Media Development Authority of Singapore.
