= Beyond the Border =

Beyond the Border may refer to:

- Beyond the Border (1925 film), a 1925 silent film
- Beyond the Border (2011 film), a 2011 Swedish film
- Beyond the Border Storytelling Festival, based in Wales, UK
