= Sion Russell Jones =

Welsh musician

Siôn Russell Jones is a Welsh singer and songwriter.Jones was born in Cardiff, Wales, he started playing the guitar at the age of 7 and later studied music at the University of Glamorgan (now the University of South Wales). His father, Terry Dyddgen Jones was an executive producer of globally televised British soap operas, namely Coronation Street and EastEnders.

== Music career ==
In October 2010, Jones released his debut solo album And Suddenly via Still Small Voice Music, and the single 'Indestructible' became BBC Radio Wales single of the week. And Suddenly's songs were used in the background on the British soap operas Coronation Street and EastEnders. He's also had songs featured in the Welsh comedy Stella.

Jones has signed a publishing deal with BDi music, the label published by Jake Gosling who worked with Ed Sheeran on + (album). And he also signed a deal with Stonebridge guitars the same year.

During the summer of 2011, he performed at several UK festivals, including The Acoustic Festival of Britain, Festival of the Celts, and Green Man Festival, and has also played in many music festivals such as Liverpool Sound City, Sŵn, Hop Farm Festival, Croissant neuf, The Great Escape Festival. Also he opened a concert for Newton Faulkner. To date (2021) he has been part of a band or playing solo he has played over 500 concerts since 2013, and as of 2021 Jones has released 6 albums and 2 singles.

=== Sion Russell Jones tours ===
As well as touring the United Kingdom, Jones has also played concerts in Belgium, Holland, Switzerland, France, Austria, Germany, Sweden and Japan. In March 2012, Jones performed at the SXSW musical festival in Austin, Texas, and the sister festival North by Northeast in Toronto, Canada, and also at the Rockwood Music Hall in New York City. In 2013, Sion opened in the UK for US band Hanson at Solus in Cardiff.

=== Angel Hotel ===
Since 2020, Jones became a founding member of the 80's indie-pop band 'Angel Hotel' alongside Carys Jones (bass, vocals, graphic design), Jordan Dibble (drums), and Barny Southgate (virtuosic keys). The band were rewarded as artist of the week as part of Huw Stephens' BBC Radio Wales show in 2022. And in summer 2023, the band's single Bump became single of the week on Nation.Cymru's website. Angel Hotel in September 2024 released their debut album, I Can Find You If I Look Hard Enough.

=== Taff Rapids ===
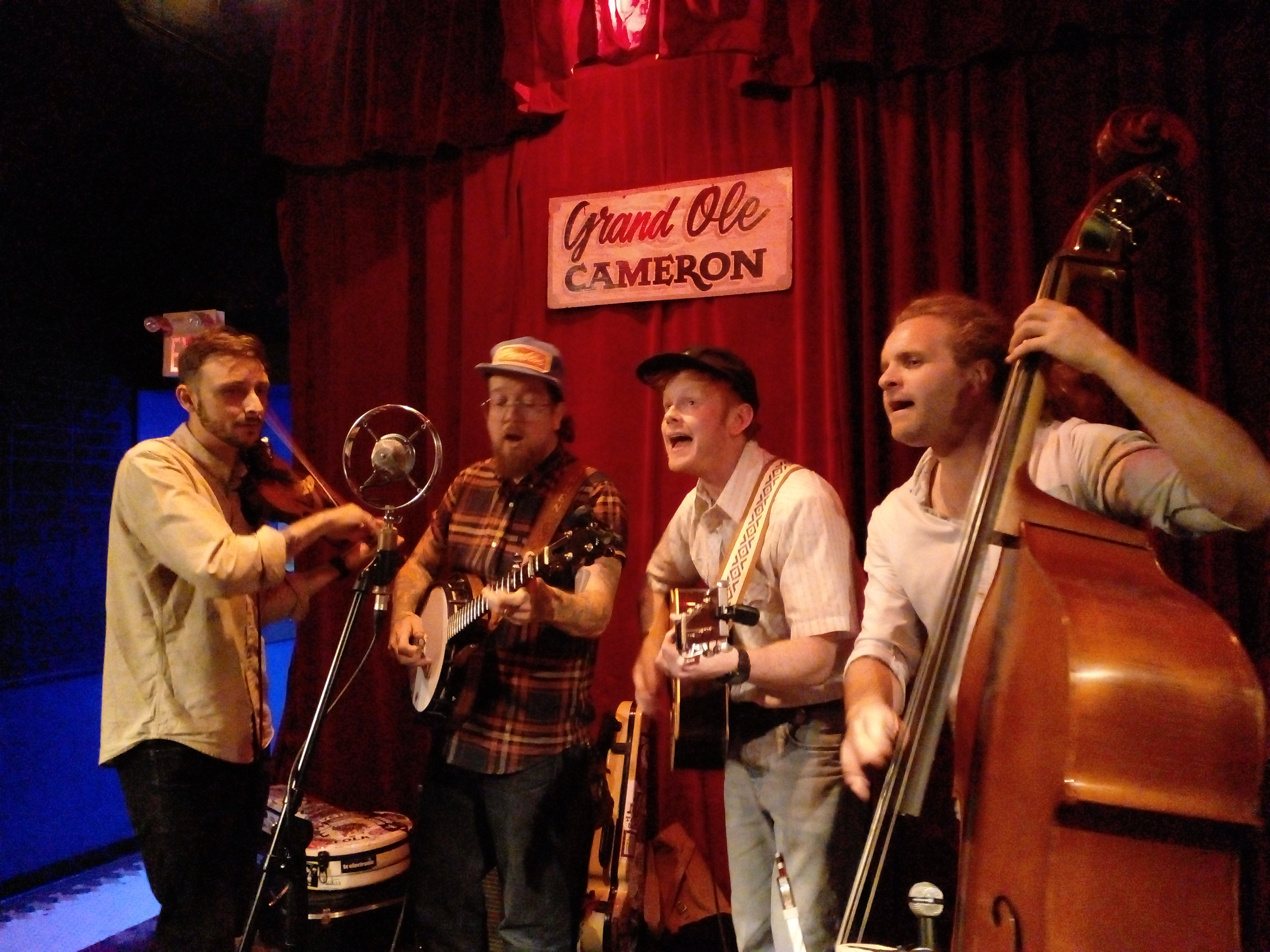
Taff Rapids in Toronto, Canada, Sion is 3rd from the left.

As part of the Bluegrass music band named Taff Rapids, Sion Russell Jones plays gigs in Cardiff, Wales, and he was on an international tour during the Autumn of 2023. The band started in Raleigh, North Carolina for the International Bluegrass Music Association festival and then toured cities in Ontario, Canada. Returning in 2025 for the Folk Alliance International festival and other shows.
