= Carole Bromley =

British poet

- Education: University of Reading; University of York; University of Glamorgan
- Occupations: Poet, creative writing tutor
- Children: 4

Carole Bromley is a British poet, and creative writing tutor for the University of York.

== Life ==
Carole has degrees from University of Reading and University of York, as well as an M Phil. in Writing from the University of Glamorgan (now the University of South Wales).

Carole Bromley has been writing for about ten years. She recently gave up her teaching job to spend more time writing and now tutors in creative writing for York University Centre for Lifelong Learning, as well as running occasional workshops in schools. She is currently running Poetry Surgeries on behalf of The Poetry Society.

Her poems have been widely published in magazines, including The New Welsh Review, The Rialto, The North, Mslexia, Magma, and Stand.

In 2005, her pamphlet collection Unscheduled Halt was a first stage winner in the Poetry Business Book and Pamphlet Competition, and was also invited to read at the Aldeburgh Poetry Festival. She read as a part of poets featured in A Twist of Malice.

Bromley is married with four children and lives in York.

== Awards ==
Carole has won or been placed in the following competitions: The Bridport Prize, Housman Society, Yorkshire, Ware, New Forest, Whiteadder Press, Staple, Mslexia, BT, Barnet, Guardian Text Poem, Connections, Writersinc, Yorkshire Evening Press, Lancaster Litfest, Ilkley.

== Work ==
- "le penseur", Smiths Knoll, No 17 - 1998
- Away
- "A Candle for Lesley"; "Tom Makes His Mark"; "A Jewish giant at home with his parents"; "Pilgrimage"
- "Dad's Bike", Close readings, The Guardian, 6 February 2007

=== Books ===
- Mslexia, Autumn 2001
- Unscheduled Halt, Smith/Doorstop 2005, ISBN 978-1-902382-72-2
- Skylight, Smith/Doorstop 2009, ISBN 1-902382-72-2
- A Guided Tour of the Ice House 2011, ISBN 978-1906613310
- The Stonegate Devil 2015, ISBN 978-1910367544
- Blast Off! 2017, ISBN 978-1910367766

=== Anthologies ===
- Wading Through Deep Water (ed. Tony Curtis), 2001
- Images of Women (ed. Myra Schneider and Dilys Wood), Arrowhead Press in association with Second Light, 2006
- A Twist of Malice, Grey Hen Press, ISBN 978-0-9552952-2-5

== Reviews ==
Carole Bromley's word-paintings glow likewater-colours; her gentle, often wistful, family anecdotes always have a twist and a new insight. These neat, witty pieces justify the growing list of prizes beside her name.
