= Sue Bale =

British nurse

Sue Bale, OBE FRCN, RGN, NDN, RHV is a British nurse with a special interest in wound healing.

== Education and career ==
She received her PhD degree from the University of Glamorgan (now the University of South Wales) in 2003. She currently works Director of Research & Development in Aneurin Bevan Health Board.

== Work in wound healing ==
Bale was part of the original team that established a unique wound healing service in the Wound Healing Research Unit, based at the University of Wales College of Medicine. She has written a range of books and articles on wound care.

She is a founder member of the Wound Care Society (1985); the European Wound Management Association; (1991); the Journal of Wound Care (1992); the European Pressure Ulcer Advisory Panel (1996).

== Fellowship ==
Professor Bale was awarded Fellowship of the Royal College of Nursing in 2004.

== Recent publications ==
- Bale, Sue; V. Jones (2004). Wound Care Nursing, 2nd Edition - A Patient-Centered Approach. Mosby Ltd. ISBN 0-7234-3344-5.
- Bale, Sue; N. Tebble; V.J. Jones; P.Price (2004). "The benefits of implementing a new skin care protocol in nursing homes". Journal of Tissue Viability. 14 (2): 44–50. PMID 15114926.
- Bale, Sue; N. Tebble; P. Price (2004). "A topical metronidazole gel used to treat malodorous wounds". British Journal of Nursing. 13 (11): S4–11. PMID 15218439.
- Jones, V.; S. Bale; K.G. Harding (2004). Acute and chronic wound healing. In "Wound Care Essentials Practice" (S. Baronowski & E.A. Ayello, eds. Lippincott Williams and Wilkins. ISBN 1-58255-274-6.
