= Gerrion Jones =

Welsh art collector

- Born: 1963; Merthyr Tydfil, Wales, UK

Gerrion Jones a.k.a. Wacky (born 1963 in Merthyr Tydfil) is a Welsh art collector. He is best known for his curation of the Punk Forever exhibition which features artwork by Billy Childish, Jamie Reid and Jimmy Cauty.

Jones lived on the Gurnos Estate for over 25 years and was educated at the local Pen-Y-Dre High School. He worked as a cook, roadie, sound engineer and DJ followed by 12 years at The Hoover Company in Pentrebach. Whilst at Merthyr Tydfil College he trained as a panel beater and welder.

He started collecting subversive art at an early age, having been inspired by seeing the Sex Pistols on television in his early teens.

He now tours the exhibition regularly; most recently at Gwynedd Museum and Art Gallery in Bangor, Gwynedd.
