= Maciej Dakowicz =

Polish photographer

Maciej Dakowicz (born 20 November 1976) is a Polish street photographer, photojournalist and gallerist. He is from Białystok in North East Poland. Dakowicz is best known for his series of photographs of Cardiff night-life titled Cardiff after Dark. He and others set up and ran Third Floor Gallery in Cardiff and he was a member of the In-Public street photography collective.

== Life and work ==
Dakowicz studied computer science in Poland (2000). He lived in Cardiff, Wales, between 2004 and 2012, where he worked and studied for his PhD at the University of Glamorgan (now the University of South Wales) (2010) where he also worked. He left work at the university in 2009 and completed his PhD in 2010. In 2010 he set up and ran Third Floor Gallery along with Joni Karanka and Bartosz Nowicki. He left Cardiff for London, and since 2013 has been based in Mumbai, photographing in Tunisia, Yemen, India and Bangladesh.

Dakowicz is best known for his series of photographs of Cardiff night-life titled Cardiff after Dark, also the name of his later book. Photographed over four years, photographs from the series have featured in magazines and been exhibited in galleries. Individual images from the series have also been used out of context and with misleading captions by the British tabloid media to support a single narrative about alcoholic excess. This tabloid practice has been criticised; for example, Jonathan Jones wrote in The Guardian that "Humour is the most obvious thing about his pictures, and their attraction lies in the way they balance grotesque abandon with poised, coolly beautiful lighting." Sean O'Hagan said in The Guardian that "it is not all outrageousness and vulgarity: Dakowicz also catches the sense of camaraderie and celebration in Cardiff on a Saturday night. He has an outsider's eye for telling detail, a way of showing us, in often brilliantly dramatic fashion and with a degree of gleeful humour, what is right under our noses."

In March 2013 Dakowicz became a member of the In-Public street photography collective.

His book Sonepur Mela (2021) contains photographs taken at Sonepur Cattle Fair in India between 2010 and 2017.

== Publications ==
=== Books of work by Dakowicz ===
- Sixteen Countries.
  - First edition. Self published, Blurb.
  - Second edition, 2009. Self published, Blurb. Contains 114 photographs from between 2003 and 2008. (Note: The book is shown here at blurb.com where it states "There are many differences between this and the original edition. Around half of photos were changed, almost all portraits and landscapes/cityscapes are gone. Now the book contains mostly street, documentary and travel photos. All photos were toned again to ensure that all are well printed. The cover is different and the layout inside has been modified slightly. You could say it is a completely new book.")
- Cardiff after Dark. London: Thames & Hudson, 2012. ISBN 978-0-500-54419-8. Introduction by Sean O'Hagan. (Note: The publisher's page for the book is here.)
- Sonepur Mela. Self-published, 2021. ISBN 978-83-959812-0-3. With an introduction by Gareth Fitzpatrick.

=== Books with contributions by Dakowicz ===
- Flash Forward 2009. Edited by Simon Bainbridge. Toronto: Magenta Foundation. ISBN 9780973973976.
- Street Photography Now. London: Thames & Hudson, 2010. ISBN 978-0-500-54393-1 (hardback). London: Thames & Hudson, 2011. ISBN 978-0-500-28907-5 (paperback). Edited by Sophie Howarth and Stephen McLaren. (Note: The book is described here at tumblr.com.)
- Hijacked III: Australia / United Kingdom. Cottesloe, W.A.: Big City Press; Heidelberg: Kenrer, 2012. ISBN 9783868282856. Exhibition catalogue.
- Read This If You Want to Take Great Photographs. By Henry Carroll. London: Laurence King, 2014. ISBN 978-1780673356.
- The World Atlas of Street Photography. New Haven and London: Yale University: 2014, ISBN 978-0-300-20716-3. Edited by Jackie Higgins. With a foreword by Max Kozloff.
- 100 Great Street Photographs. Munich, London, New York: Prestel, 2017. By David Gibson. ISBN 978-3791383132. Contains a commentary on and a photograph by Dakowicz.

== Exhibitions ==
=== Solo exhibitions ===
- 2011: Cardiff by Night. Galeria im. Sleńdzińskich, Białystok, Poland.
- 2011: BigLittleCity, Old Library, Cardiff.
- 2012: China Impressions, Paris Van Java shopping mall, Bandung, Indonesia.
- 2012: Cardiff after Dark, Third Floor Gallery, Cardiff.

=== Exhibitions with others or during festivals ===
- Street Photography Now, Third Floor Gallery, Cardiff, October–November 2010, and toured to Contributed Studio for the Arts, Berlin, December 2010 – January 2011; Museum of Printing, Historical Museum of Warsaw, Warsaw, November 2011 – January 2012. Photographs from the book Street Photography Now (2011).
- Street Photography Now, shop windows throughout the Canal Saint-Martin area, part of Mois de la Photo-OFF, Paris, November 2010; Gallery Lichtblick, Cologne, 2010; Uno Art Space, Stuttgart, April–June 2011.
- 2011: Cardiff after Dark screened at Visa pour l'image 2011, Perpignan, France.
- 2011: Mass Photography: Blackpool through the Camera. Grundy Art Gallery, Blackpool.
- 2013: Divine Bodies, Laing Art Gallery, Newcastle.
- 2013: Cardiff After Dark, White Cloth Gallery, Leeds, UK. With Donald Weber.
- 2015: The Sharp Eye. In-Public in Mexico, Foto Mexico, Cine Tonalá, Mexico City, Mexico, October–November 2015. Slideshow of photographs.

== Awards ==
- 2009: 170 Lat Fotografii = 170 Years of Photography, Plfoto.com, OnePhoto.net and Obiektywni.pl, Poland, "People" Category Winner.
- 2009: VIVA! Photo Awards 2009, Poland, The Grand Prix Award.
- 2009: Magenta Flash Forward Emerging Photographer 2009.
- 2009: Digital Camera Photographer of the Year 2009, UK, 3rd place, Highly Commended and Commended in "This is Britain" Category.
- 2010: Digital Camera Photographer of the Year 2010, UK, 2nd place in the "Documentary" category.
- 2010: Digital Camera Photographer of the Year 2010, UK, 3rd place in the "Adrenaline" category.
- 2010: BZ WBK Press Photo 2010, Poland, 3rd place in the "Civilisation" category.
- 2010: Wielki Konkurs National Geographic 2010, Poland, Honourable Mention in the "Reportage" category.
- 2011: BZ WBK Press Photo 2011, Poland, 2nd place in the "Society" category.
- 2011: BZ WBK Press Photo 2011, Poland, 3rd place in the "Nature" category.
- 2016: First prize, News category, BZ WBK Press Foto, Poland. For photographs of the aftermath of an earthquake in Nepal, 2015.
- 2018: First Place, Single Image category, LensCulture Street Photography Awards, for "Beach Scene, Chaung Tha, Myanmar"
