= Randii Wessen =

American economist (born 1958)

Randii R. Wessen
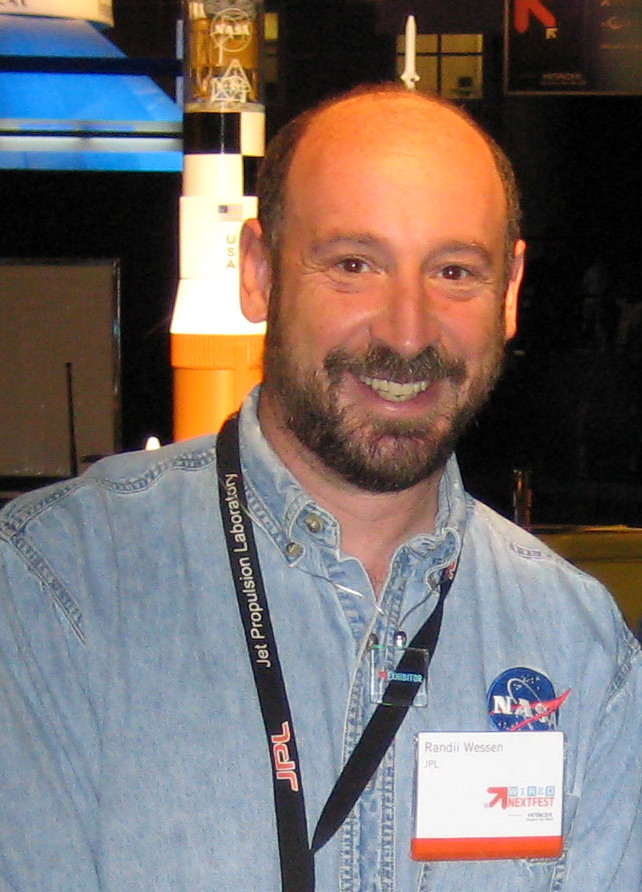
- Randii Wessen at Wired NextFest
- Born: May 13, 1958 (age 68); Manhattan, New York
- Education: Stony Brook University; University of Southern California; University of Glamorgan (now the University of South Wales)
- Awards: NASA Exceptional Service Medal
- Scientific career
- Fields: Planetary Exploration; Experimental Economics
- Workplaces: University of Southern California's Earth & Space Science Institute; Rockwell International; California Institute of Technology; Jet Propulsion Laboratory

Randii Ray Wessen (born May 13, 1958) is an American astronautics systems engineer specifically involved in planetary exploration, experimental economist, and writer. Dr. Wessen has been an employee of the California Institute of Technology's Jet Propulsion Laboratory since 1984. He is currently the A-Team Lead Study Architect for JPL's Innovation Foundry. On the side, Wessen works with Dr. David Porter of Chapman University in the field of Experimental Economics, where they are designing a system to help allocate resources for building instruments on robotic deep space planetary spacecraft. This proposed system will build on the success of the Cassini Resource Exchange and be applied to NASA's Outer Planet Flagship Missions.

== Jet Propulsion Laboratory ==
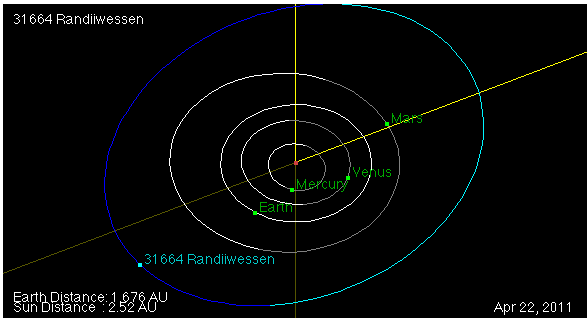
This is the orbital diagram for asteroid 31664Randiiwessen showing its location on 2011 April 22.

Wessen's first job at JPL was as the Voyager Science Sequence Coordinator for the Uranus and Neptune encounters. He helped coordinate science observation requests submitted by the eleven different Principal Investigators. These requests were integrated into one large sequence of events. These sequences of events were transmitted up to the Voyager spacecraft, executed as a series of encounter activities at the planet, and then transmitted back down to Earth as scientific data. Results were produced into charts, graphs, images, and videos, most of which had never been seen by individuals outside of the space program. He was most proud of personally building the post-encounter sequences for Neptune. It was this effort that earned him NASA's Exceptional Service Medal.

From there he moved on to the Cassini Program which was building a spacecraft destined for Saturn. On Cassini he moved from science to system engineering. After eight years he then changed focus and became the Telecommunications & Mission Systems Manager for the Mars Program. He worked as an intermediary between the many Mars spacecraft in both development and operations and the Deep Space Network to ensure communication between them. This work included activity with the Mars Global Surveyor, the 2001 Mars Odyssey, European Space Agency's Mars Express, Mars Reconnaissance Orbiter, and most famously the Mars Exploration Rovers.

Wessen then moved to the Navigator Program as its Program System Engineer dealing with the search of Earth-like planets around other stars. This program had two ground-based projects (the Large Binocular Telescope Interferometer and the Michelson Science Center) and three space borne projects (the Space Interferometry Mission, the Terrestrial Planet Finder – Coronagraph, and the Terrestrial Planet Finder – Interferometer).

Wessen is currently the A-Team Lead Study Architect for JPL's Innovation Foundry. This position involves leading a team of scientists and engineers with idea generation for future mission concepts, feasibility studies of these new concepts, and trade space exploration to make sure that the mission concept going forward is the best one possible within constraints.

== Publications ==
- Miner, E.; Wessen, R.; Cuzzi, J. (2007). Planetary Ring Systems. Springer-Praxis Books in Space Exploration. Berlin: Springer Praxis. ISBN 978-0-387-34177-4.
- Porter, D.; Wessen, R.R. (2007). "Creating Out of This World Markets at NASA". Journal of the Hayek Society of the London School of Economics. 8 (1): 37–53.
- Wessen, R.R.; Padilla, D.A. (February 1, 2004). "Navigator Program Risk Management" (PDF). 8 (1). Space System Engineering & Risk Management Symposium: 37–53. 20060043410. Archived from the original (PDF) on October 13, 2006.
- Miner, E.D.; Wessen, R.R. (March 2002). Neptune: The Planet, Rings and Satellites. Springer-Praxis Books in Astronomy and Space Science. Chichester, UK: Springer Praxis. ISBN 978-1-85233-216-7.
- Hilland, J.; Wessen, R.; Porter, D.; Austin, R. (August 7, 2002). "A Market-Based Conflict Resolution Approach for Satellite Mission Planning". IEEE Transactions on Engineering Management. 48 (3): 272–282. doi:10.1109/17.946526.
- Wessen, R. R.; Porter, D. (June 1998). "Market-Based Systems for Instrument Development and Science Planning" (PDF). Journal of Reducing Space Mission Cost. 1 (2): 119–132. doi:10.1023/A:1009981011561. S2CID 107280652.
- Ledyard, J.; Porter, D.; Wessen, R. (March 2000). "A Market-Based Mechanism for Allocating Space Shuttle Secondary Payload Priority" (PDF). Experimental Economics. 2 (3): 73–195. doi:10.1007/BF01669195.
- Wessen, R. R.; Porter, D.; Hilland, J. (August 1, 1999). "Experimental Results of LightSAR Mission Planning Using a Market-Based System" (PDF). Journal of Space Mission Architecture (1): 11–22. 20060040829. Archived from the original (PDF) on May 28, 2010.
- Wessen, R. R.; Porter, D. (January–February 1999). "A Market-Based Approach for Manifesting Shuttle Secondary Payloads". Journal of Spacecraft and Rockets. 36 (1): 142–147. Bibcode:1999JSpRo..36..142W. doi:10.2514/2.3426.
- Wessen, R. R.; Porter, D. (1998). "Market-Based Approaches for Controlling Space Mission Costs: The Cassini Resource Exchange". Journal of Reducing Space Mission Cost. 1 (1): 9–25. doi:10.1023/A:1009990907796. S2CID 108105124.
- Wessen, R. R.; Porter, D. (August 1997). "A Management Approach for Allocating Instrument Development Resources". Space Policy. 13 (3): 191–201. Bibcode:1997SpPol..13..191W. doi:10.1016/S0265-9646(97)00014-3.
- Wessen, R. R. (November–December 1996). "Tradeoffs between Science Objectives and Ground System Capability". Journal of Spacecraft and Rockets. 33 (6): 883–886. Bibcode:1996JSpRo..33..883W. doi:10.2514/3.26855.
- Wessen, R. R.; Finnerty, D.F. (November 1992). "Science Planning and Sequencing for Cassini" (PDF). SpaceOps 1992: Proceedings of the Second International Symposium on Ground Data Systems for Space Mission Operations. 19940019398.
- Miner, E.D.; Ingersoll, A.P; Esposito, L.; T., Johnson; Wessen, R. (January 28, 1985). "Science objectives and preliminary sequence designs for the Voyager Uranus and Neptune encounters". JPL TM D-2097.

== Notable Awards ==
- Fellow, Royal Astronomical Society
- Fellow, British Interplanetary Society
- Associate Fellow, American Institute of Aeronautics and Astronautics
- NASA Exceptional Service Medal for Voyager 2 Neptune Encounter
