= South Wales Business School =

Business school of the University of South Wales

Coordinates: 51.589°N 3.326°W

- Type: Business School
- Established: 2013
- Parent institution: University of South Wales
- Location: Newport and Treforest, Wales
- Website: Official website

The South Wales Business School is the Business School of the University of South Wales and was established in 2013. The school is currently situated in the Faculty of Creative Industries. It has expertise up to professorial level in the areas of finance and accounting, marketing, strategy, marketing, economics, enterprise, human resource management, project management, leadership and governance. The School is also a Chartered Institute of Procurement & Supply (CIPS) Centre of Excellence.

== Students ==
The Business School has a student body of approximately 4,000 students, with students studying full-time, part-time, on-line, on-campus and off-campus at locations in Pontypridd, Cardiff, Newport, Merthyr Tydfil, and overseas.

== Research ==
Following the publication of the results from the Research Assessment Exercise 2008, (RAE2008), where the Business School research was submitted, 5% was assessed as world leading, 10% as internationally excellent, 50% as recognised internationally and 35% recognised nationally. None was unclassified.

The six research centres at the University of South Wales Business School are led by academics in the fields of entrepreneurship and enterprise; work place bullying; leadership; marketing; organisational governance; creative supply chain thinking; public service management; organisational sustainability; business ethics; and creative organisational development.

- Centre for Research on Workplace Behaviours
- Welsh Enterprise Institute (WEI) Research Unit
- Welsh Research Unit for Governance and Leadership (WRUGL)
- Welsh Institute for Competitive Advantage
- Centre for Research on Consumption, Markets and Culture
- Centre for Research in Futures and Innovation
