= Camilla Way =

English author

Camilla Way (born 1973 in Greenwich, London) is an English author who was previously, from 2005, an editor at the men's style magazine Arena. Her first book, The Dead of Summer, was published in 2007.

== Background ==
Camilla Way is the daughter of the poet and author Peter Way. She was educated at Woolwich College and the University of Glamorgan (now the University of South Wales) and was formerly an associate editor of the teenage girls' magazine Bliss.

- The Dead of Summer (2007) was shortlisted for the CWA New Blood Dagger Award 2007. It is set in the long, hot summer of 1986 in Greenwich, London, and culminates in the murder of three teenage children as told seven years later to a police psychologist by Anita, who was the sole witness to the crime.
- Little Bird (2008) is the title of Way's second novel. The story is about the character Kate who never speaks about the past. She glances nervously over her shoulder as if she is being followed. If you pay attention, you might hear how carefully she speaks. And if you were to search, you might find the old newspaper clippings she has hidden away: Kidnap Girl "Like Wild Animal", The Mysterious Disappearance of "Little Bird" But these are just fragments of a long-buried past - another life, another girl. Secrets left unspoken, until now. . . . The story is based on a child who was kidnapped as a baby and has lived a life of isolation. The book shows the development feral children have to make after their capture, and it shows how Kate in particular grew and matured into an adult. The story is set in many settings - from France to America to England. "Little Bird" received good recommendations from the magazines Cosmopolitan and Marie Claire who said Little Bird was "Hauntingly beautiful and emotionally truthful" and "Brilliantly executed - it's simply impossible to put down".

== Works ==
- The Dead of Summer, Harcourt, 2008, ISBN 978-0151013708
- Little Bird, Charnwood, 2010, ISBN 978-1444800111
- Watching Edie, Berkley, 2016, ISBN 978-1101991633
- The Lies We Told, Berkley, 2018, ISBN 978-1101989524
