= Ellen Evans =

Welsh writer, teacher and principal of Glamorgan Training College

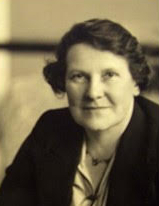
- Born: 10 March 1891; Gelli, Rhondda
- Died: 26 September 1953 (aged 62)
- Education: Aberystwyth University
- Known for: principal of the Glamorgan Training College

Ellen Evans CBE (10 March 1891 – 26 September 1953) was a writer, teacher and principal of Glamorgan Training College in Barry. She was a leading advocate for teaching Welsh in schools.

== Life ==
Evans was born in Gelli in Wales in 1891. Her parents were John and Ellen Evans and they both came from Cardiganshire. She went to Rhondda secondary school and after becoming a pupil-teacher she went to the University of Aberystwyth where she obtained a degree in 1914.

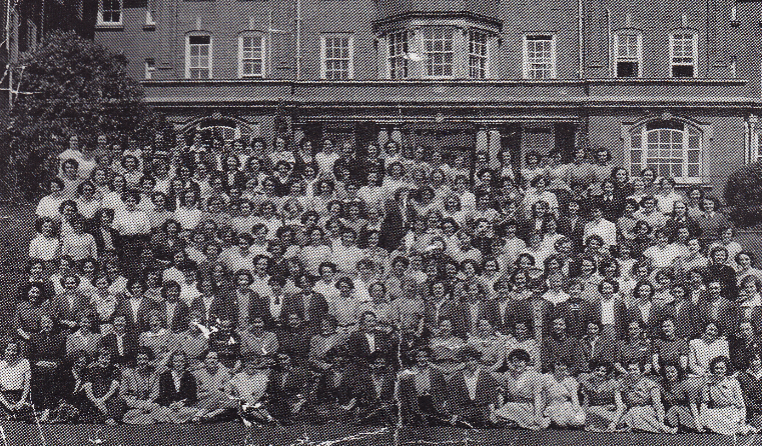
Ellen Evans and her students in 1951-2

In 1914 Glamorgan County Council created Glamorgan Training College to train women to teach and Hilda M Raw was the first Principal. Evans began work there in 1915. Raw served until 1923 when Evans was promoted to succeed her. She was a leading advocate for teaching Welsh in schools. The college only took women who lived in Monmouthshire or Glamorganshire.

In 1947, the college decided to accept students irrespective of where they lived and in the same year she was given a CBE for the work in Education.

Evans served as the Principal of Glamorgan College of Education until she died in 1953 when she was succeeded by Olive R Powell. In 1965 her college changed its name to Glamorgan College of Education.

== Writing and legacy ==
In 1924 she published The Teaching of Welsh which was adapted from her masters thesis. In 1926 she published lesson plans for teachers starting to teach Welsh in her book, Llawlyfr i athrawon and in the following year Cynllun Cymraeg. These books enabled teachers to teach in the Welsh language. She created source works adapting the classic Mabinogion for younger readers in her Y Mabinogion i'r plant which was published in four volumes in 1924. She also wrote Hwiangerddi Rhiannon in 1926 and Y Wen Fro in 1931.

She has been seen as an overlooked person in Welsh history.
