= Nicola Miles-Wildin =

British disabled radio and stage actress (born 1978)

Nicola Miles-Wildin (born 1978 in Gloucester) is a British disabled theatre and radio director. She has worked as an actor. Nicola has juvenile chronic arthritis and uses a wheelchair. She portrayed Alice in Richard Cameron's play Flower Girls, a play about disabled women. In the 2012 Summer Paralympics opening ceremony she portrayed the part of Miranda from Shakespeare's The Tempest.
