= University of South Wales =

University in Wales

- Prifysgol De Cymru (Welsh)
- Coat of Arms, University of South Wales (this was previously the coat of arms of the University of Glamorgan)
- Former names: University of Glamorgan, University of Wales, Newport
- Motto: Success Through Endeavour
- Type: Public
- Established: 11 April 2013; 13 years ago (1841; 185 years ago)
- Affiliations: University Alliance; Universities UK
- Endowment: £3.3 million (2019)
- Chancellor: Rowan Williams
- Vice-Chancellor: Professor Osama Khan
- Administrative staff: 2,780
- Students: 20,790 (2024/25)
- Undergraduates: (2024/25)
- Postgraduates: 6,015 (2024/25)
- Location: Wales
- Campus: Cardiff, Newport and Pontypridd
- Website: southwales.ac.uk

The University of South Wales (USW; Welsh: Prifysgol De Cymru) is a public university in Wales, with campuses in Cardiff, Newport and Pontypridd. It was formed on 11 April 2013 from the merger of the University of Glamorgan and the University of Wales, Newport. The university is the second largest university in Wales in terms of its student numbers, and offers over 300 undergraduate and postgraduate courses. The university has three main faculties.

== History ==
The university can trace its roots to the founding of the Newport Mechanics' Institute in 1841. The Newport Mechanics' Institute later become the Gwent College of Higher Education in 1975, University of Wales College, Newport in 1996, and University of Wales, Newport in 2004.

In 1913 the South Wales and Monmouthshire School of Mines was formed. The school of mines was later to become the Polytechnic of Wales, before gaining the status of University of Glamorgan in 1992.

The name for the new merged university was chosen following a research exercise amongst interested parties and announced in December 2012 by the prospective vice-chancellor of the university, Julie Lydon, who retired in 2021.

In 2020 the university entered a strategic alliance with the University of Wales Trinity Saint David through a deed of association. A joint statement said that the two universities would be "working together on a national mission to strengthen Wales’ innovation capacity, supporting economic regeneration and the renewal of its communities", while retaining their autonomy and distinct identities.

A data breach in 2019 impacted 30,000 students causing the student record system to be taken offline.

=== Notable dates ===
- 1841 Opening of Mechanics Institute, Newport.
- 1913 Opening of South Wales and Monmouthshire School of Mines, Treforest.
- 2013 Merger between the University of Glamorgan and the University of Wales, Newport.
- 2014 Rowan Williams appointed Chancellor.
- 2015 London Campus closes.
- 2016 Caerleon Campus closes.
- 2020 Dubai Campus closes.

== Student numbers ==
At formation it was reported that the university had more than 33,500 students from 122 countries and was then the sixth largest in the United Kingdom and the largest in Wales. Following the decline in student numbers reported by the Higher Education Statistics Agency (HESA) over the years since the formation of the university, for the academic year 2024/25 the university was the 56th largest in the UK and the second largest in Wales when measured by the numbers of students enrolled.

University	00-01	01-02	02-03	03-04	04-05	05-06	06-07	07-08	08-09	09-10	10–11	11–12	12–13
Glamorgan	17,530	▲18,875	▲19,820	▲20,595	▲21,325	▼20,825	▲21,535	▲22,710	▼20,900	▲21,070	▼20,210	▲21,190	▼20,345
Newport	8,185	▲8,505	▲8,980	▲9,065	9,065	▲9,380	▲9,535	▼9,120	▼9,065	▲9,290	▲10,040	▼9,990	▼9,780
Total	25,715	▲27,380	▲28,800	▲29,660	▲30,390	▼30,205	▲31,070	▲31,830	▼29,965	▲30,360	▼30,250	▲31,180	▼30,125

South Wales	12-13	13–14	14–15	15–16	16–17	17–18	18–19	19–20	20–21	21–22	22–23	23–24	24–25
Numbers	Baseline	▼29,195	▼27,710	▼25,265	▼23,465	▼22,860	▼22,330	▲23,090	▲23,150	▲23,270	▲26,180	▼23,670	▼20,790
% Change University Claim	33,500	▼-13%	▼-17%	▼-25%	▼-30%	▼-32%	▼-33%	▼-31%	▼-31%	▼-31%	▼-22%	▼-29%	▼-38%
% Change HSE Figures	30,125	▼-3%	▼-8%	▼-16%	▼-22%	▼-24%	▼-26%	▼-23%	▼-23%	▼-23%	▼-13%	▼-21%	▼-31%

Source:- The Higher Education Statistics Agency

== Organisation ==
=== Associated organisations ===
The university has a band of 106 partner colleges, universities, FE institutions or organisations, who deliver University of South Wales's higher education programmes or access courses in the UK and 18 other countries.

=== Faculties ===
The university has three faculties spread over its three campuses in South Wales.

Faculty of Computing, Engineering and Science

The Faculty of Computing, Engineering and Science comprises 8 subject areas:

- Mechanical and Aeronautical Engineering
- Aircraft Maintenance Engineering
- Biological and Forensic Sciences
- Built Environment and Civil Engineering
- Chemical and Environmental Sciences
- Computing and Mathematical Sciences
- Cyber Security
- Informatics and Electronics.

Faculty of Business & Creative Industries

The Faculty of Business and Creative Industries comprises 12 subject areas:

- Accounting and Finance
- Business Management
- Culture and Animation
- Fashion, Marketing and Photography
- Film and TV
- Games and Design
- Global Business
- Law
- Leadership and Public Services
- Music and Drama
- Operations Management
- Professional Development

Faculty of Life Sciences and Education

The Faculty of Life Sciences and Education comprises 14 subject areas:

- Allied Health and Chiropractic
- Community and Professional Practice Nursing
- Health and Social Care
- ITE and Educational Practice
- Nursing (Adult)
- Nursing (Learning Disability, Mental Health, Child)
- Operational Policing
- Policing and Criminology
- Post Compulsory Education
- Professional Learning in Education
- Psychology
- Sport
- Therapeutic Studies
- Youth, Community and Social Work

The university has a film school, animation facilities, broadcasting studios, a photography school, poets, scriptwriters and authors as well as the national music and drama conservatoire, the Royal Welsh College of Music and Drama, as a wholly owned subsidiary. It offers a range of qualifications from further education to degrees to PhD study. As a Post 92 University, it delivers a range of STEM subjects.

== Campuses ==
The university currently has three campuses all situated in South Wales.

=== Cardiff ===
ATRiuM 2A and 2B

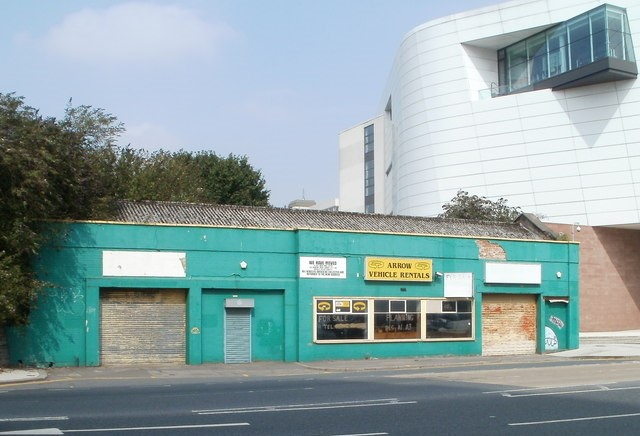
Site of an old garage prior to construction of Phase 2A

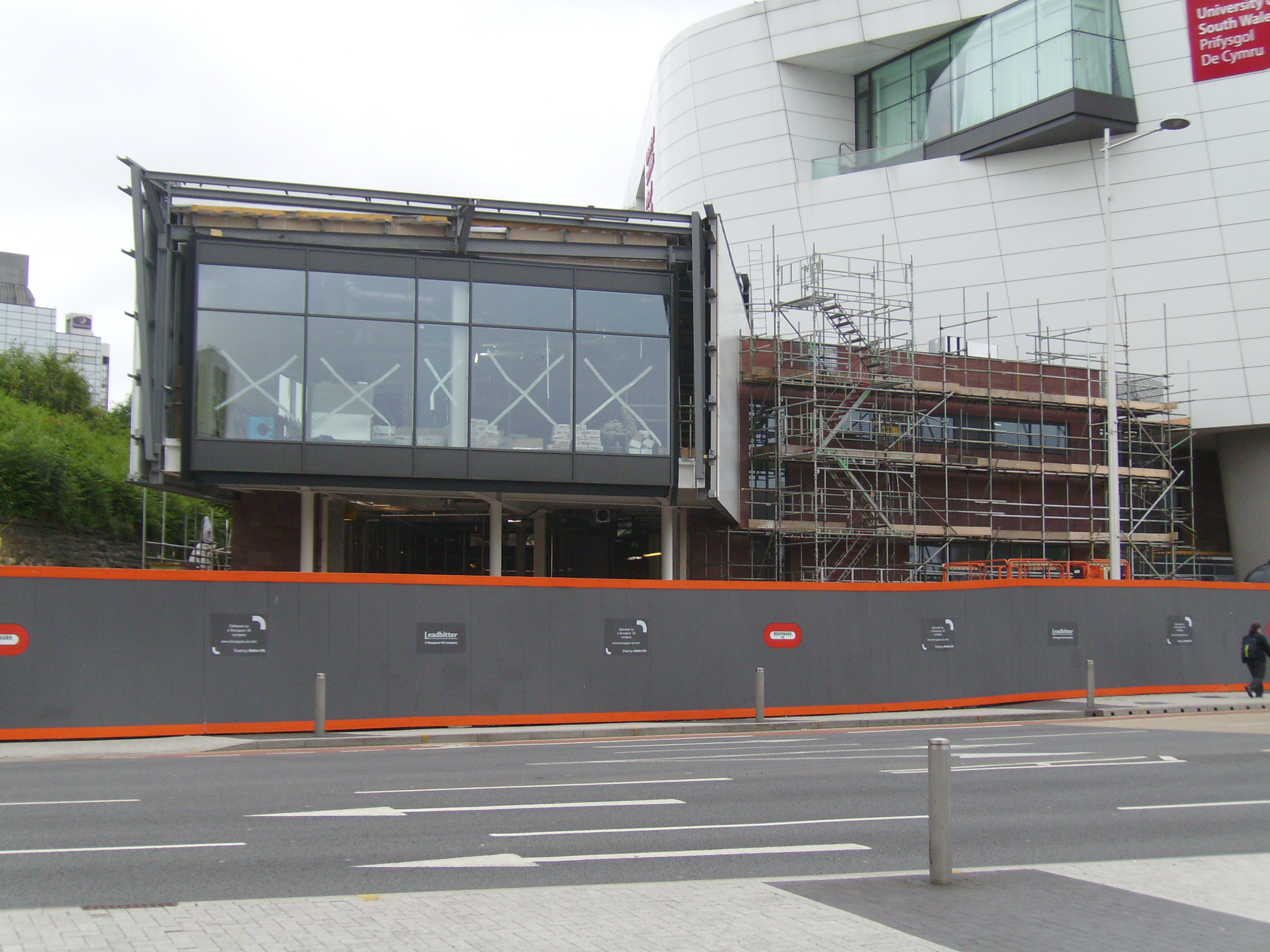
Phase 2A during construction in May 2014

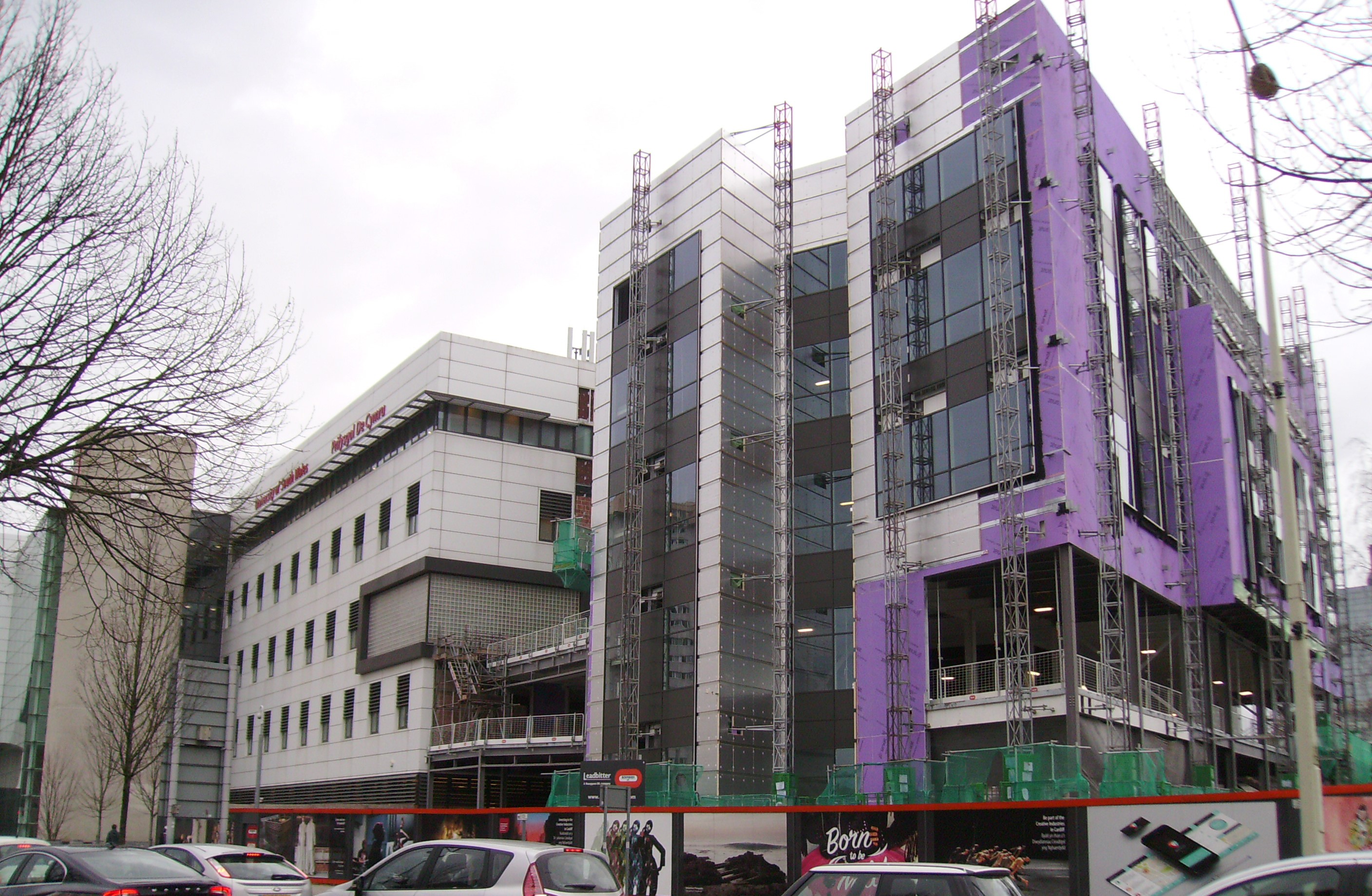
Phase 2B during construction in December 2015

The Faculty of Business & Creative Industries is based at the Cardiff Campus. The ATRiuM (officially ATRiuM: Cardiff Faculty of business and Creative Industries and also known as ATRiuM Building) is the only building at the campus. Originally opened by the University of Glamorgan in 2007 the building was extended at a cost of £14.7 million to replace the Caerleon campus. The building re-opened during September 2016. It is located in the Adamsdown area, at 86-88 Adam Street, near Cardiff Queen Street railway station.

In Phase 2, ATRiuM expanded on the western side of the original structure (phase 1) on un-used land on the eastern side and the site of an old garage on the western side. The new two storey ATRiuM 2A includes part of the South Wales Business School, as well as a Students Union bar and an 'Ideas factory'. It opened for the new term in September 2014. The eastern side ATRiuM 2B, will be a five-storey building with new teaching facilities.

Amongst the key ATRiuM facilities are a design studio, television studio, 180-seat theatre space, cinema, 180 seat main lecture theatre, a cafe and advice shops. In July 2010, it was filmed for The Sarah Jane Adventures' fifth series episode The Man Who Never Was (the final episode filmed before Elisabeth Sladen's death in 2011).

The campus also included the Atlantic House building, which was closed due to declining student numbers.

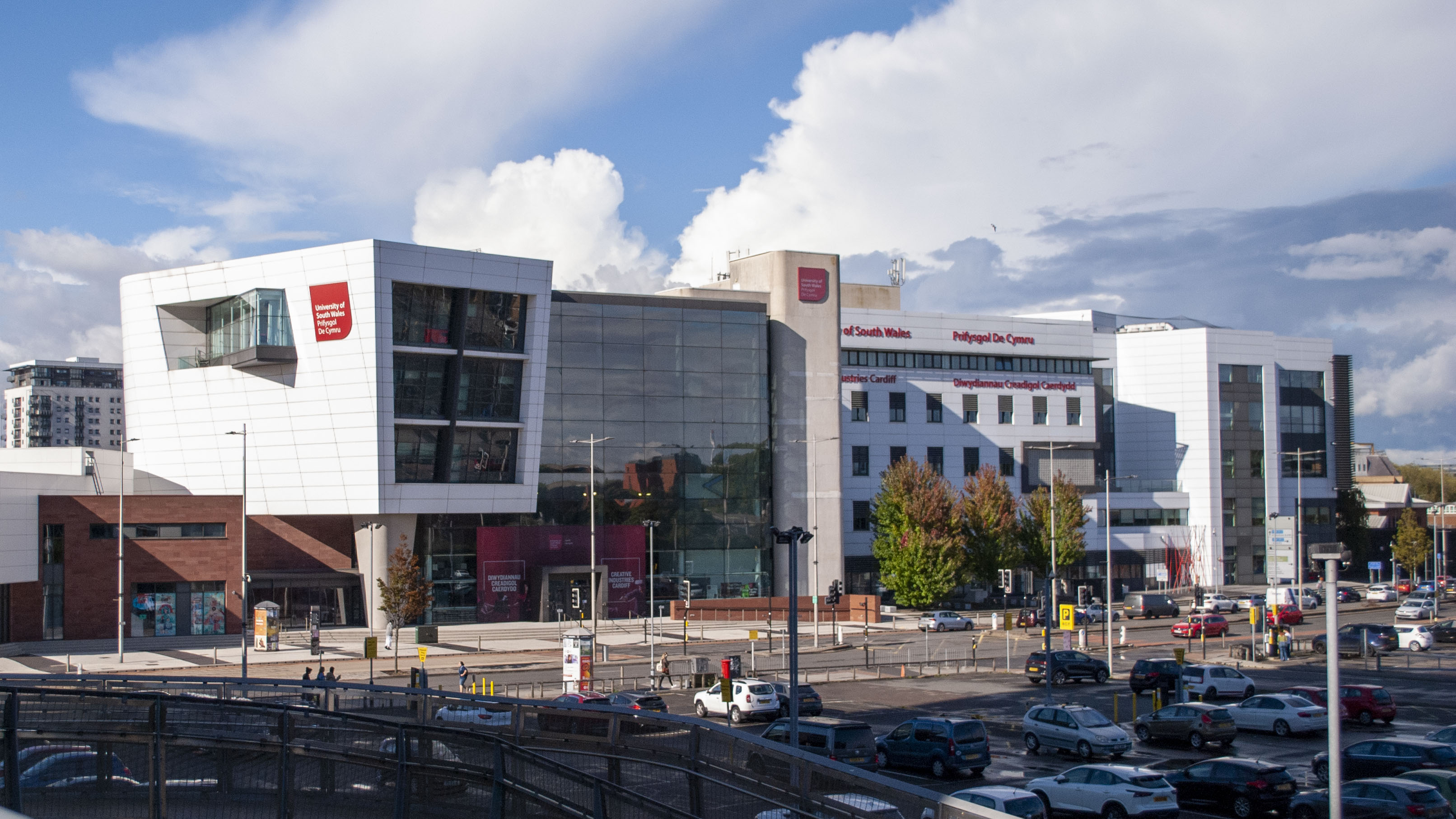
ATRiuM, Adam Street

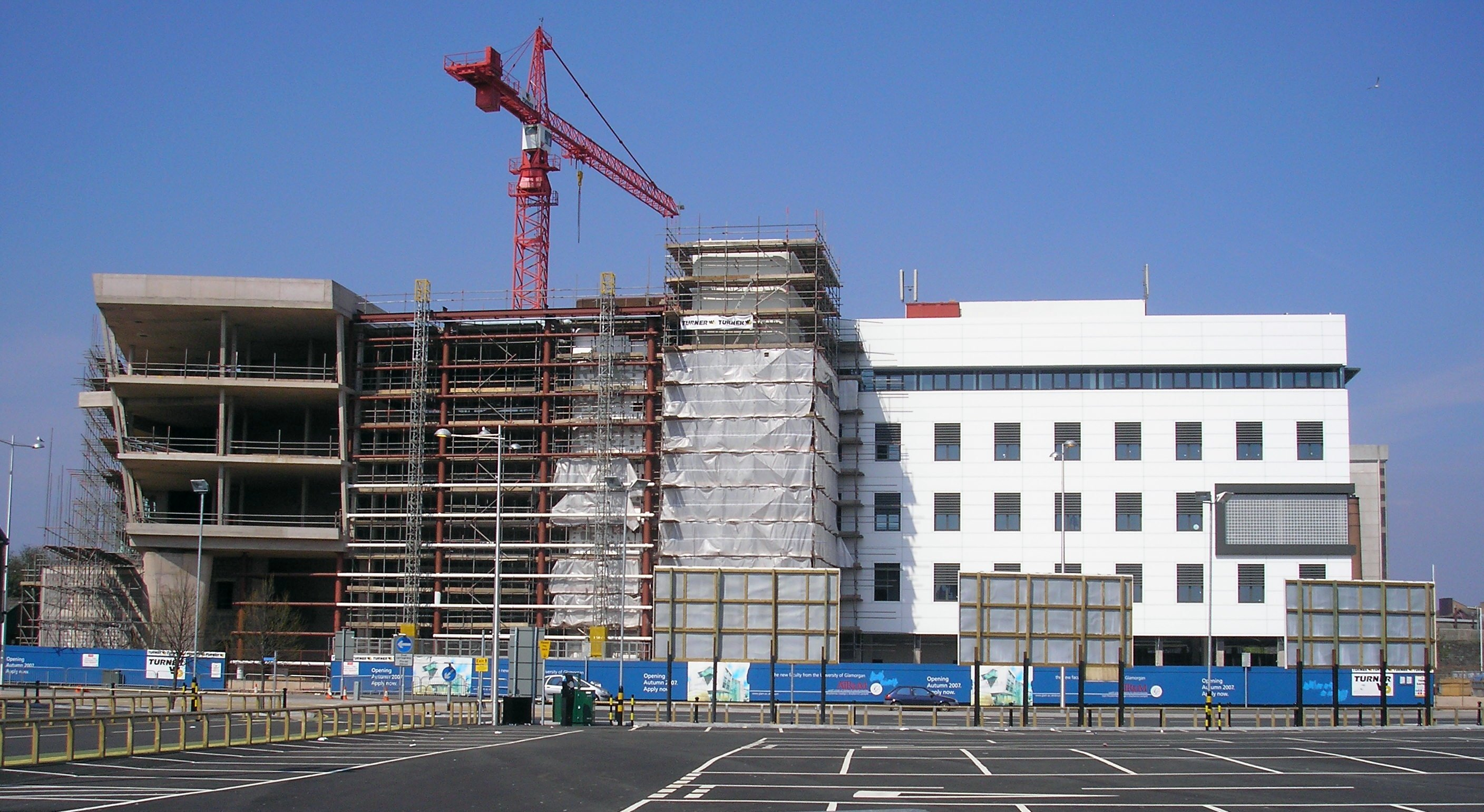
Phase 1 during construction in April 2007

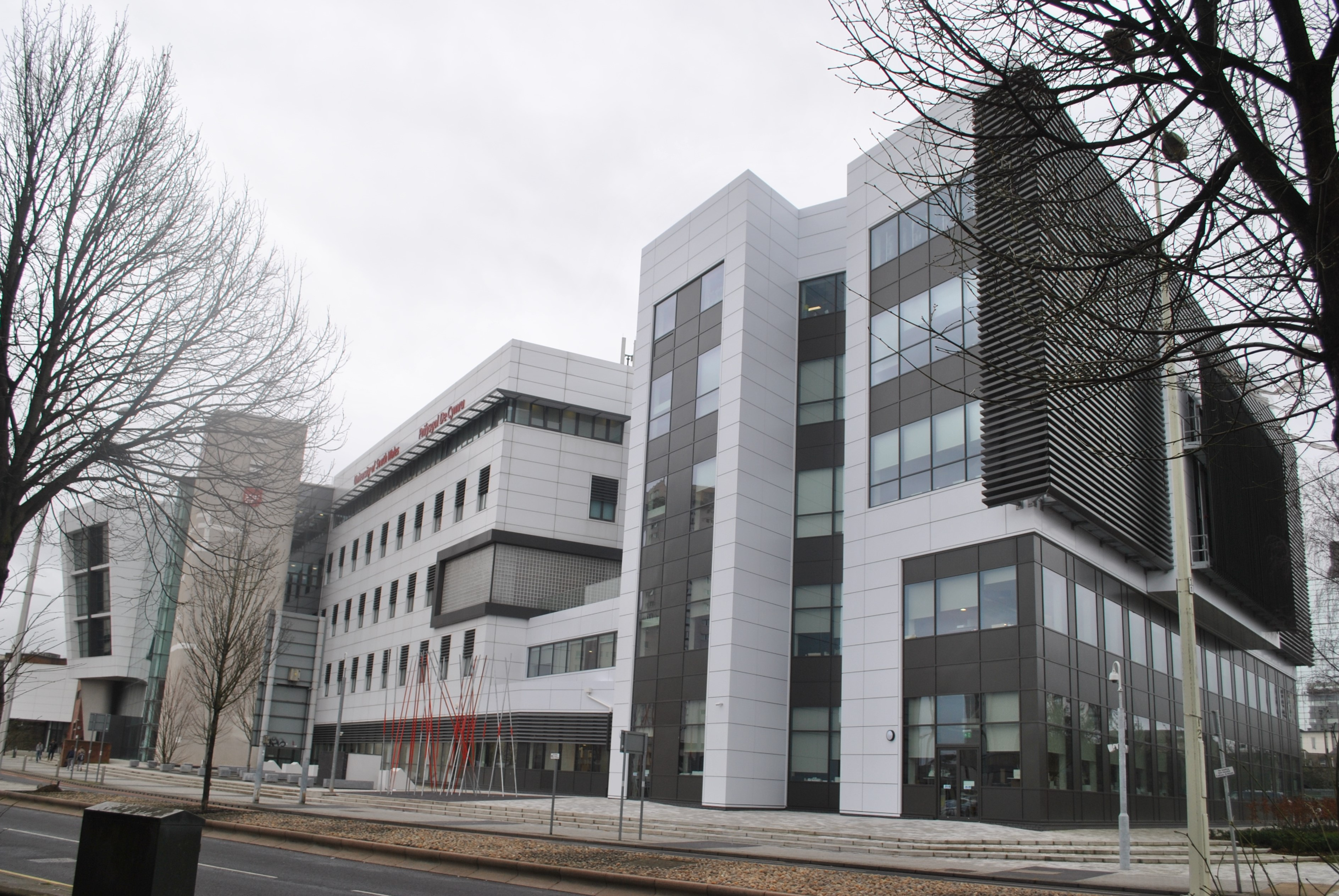
The ATRiuM building in January 2017

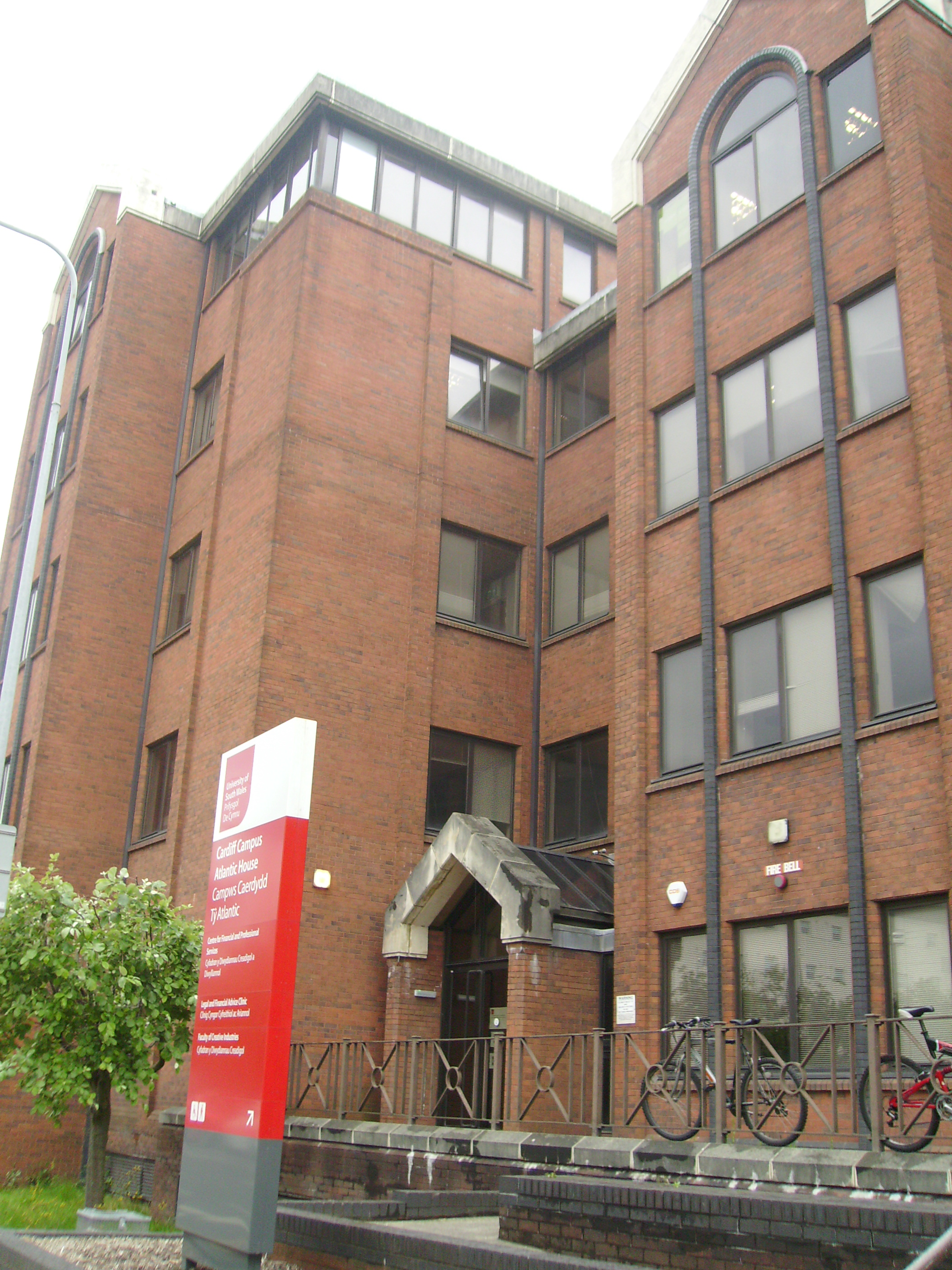
Atlantic House, Tyndall Street

=== Newport ===
The university's newest campus is the £40 million campus on the west bank of the River Usk in Newport city centre. The 'City Campus' was built for the University of Wales, Newport and was opened in 2011 by Sir Terry Matthews. Originally built to house a variety of undergraduate and postgraduate courses for the Newport Business School, Newport Film School and the university's art and design department, it now hosts departments and courses primarily from the Faculty of Life Sciences and Education, including teaching, social work and youth work as well as some courses in business together with the National Cyber Security Academy.

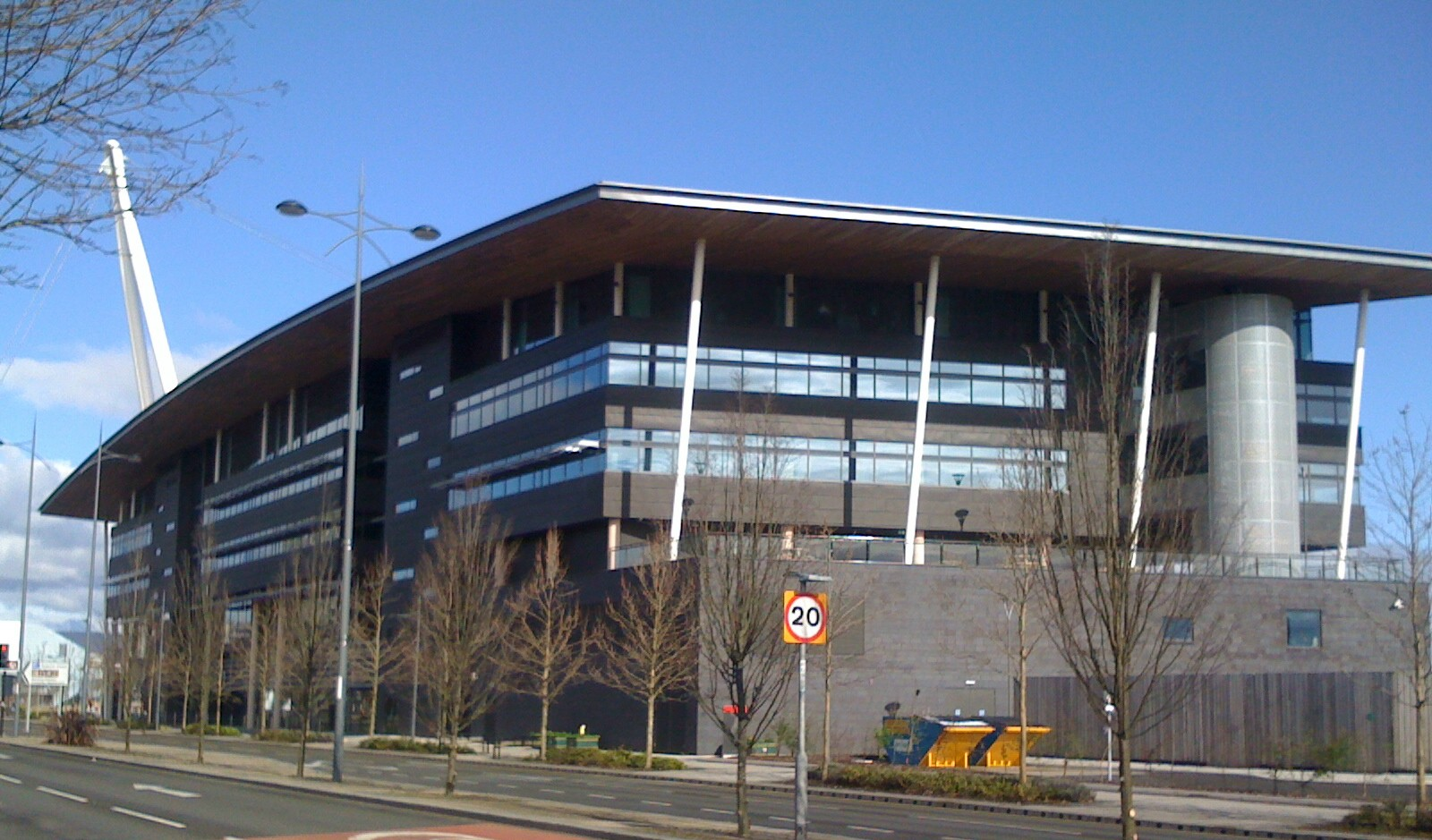

=== Pontypridd ===
This was formerly the main campus of the University of Glamorgan. Currently the university's largest campus, with a range of facilities, including an indoor sports centre and students' union. The campus is located in three parts:

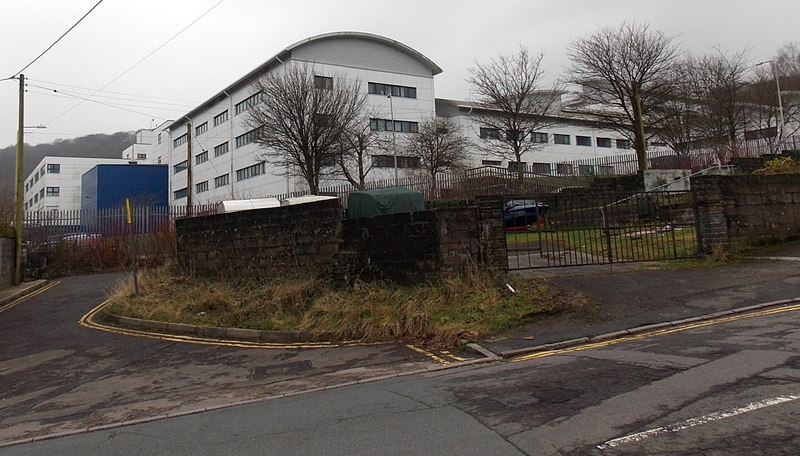
Main buildings

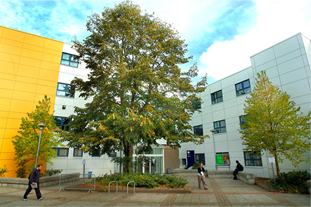
Hirwaun building

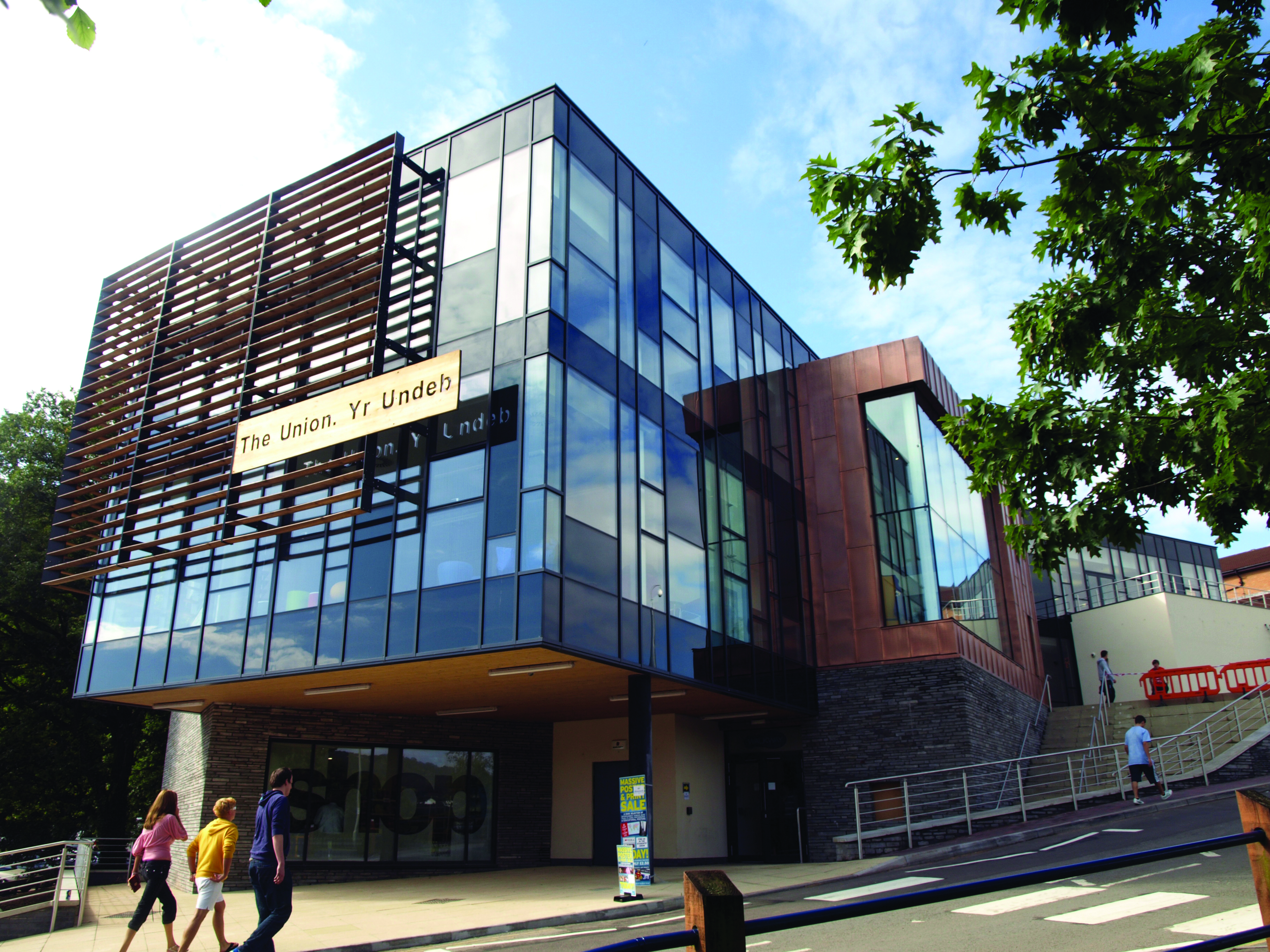
Students' Union building
1. Treforest: Courses taught at this campus include Accounting and Finance, Art, Business and Management, Chiropractic, Computing, Criminology, Engineering, English, History, Law, Mathematics, Psychology, Public Services and Sociology.
2. Glyntaff: Courses taught at this campus include Biological Sciences, Chemical and Pharmaceutical Sciences, Health and Social Care, Forensic Science, Environmental Sciences, Medical Sciences, Midwifery, Nursing and Policing.
3. Sport Park: Courses taught at this campus include Coaching and Development, Sport and Exercise Therapy, Sport and Exercise Science, Strength and Conditioning, Leadership in Sport, Sport Performance, Sport Administration and Sports Journalism.

== Former campuses ==
=== Caerleon ===
Caerleon is located on the northern outskirts of Newport. Formerly the second largest campus, it hosted a variety of undergraduate and postgraduate courses, including education, sports, history, fashion design, art and photography. The campus had extensive sports facilities, library, students' union shop and a students' union bar. It was formerly the main campus of the University of Wales, Newport. In 2014, it was announced by the University of South Wales that the Caerleon campus would close in 2016. The university cited the need to invest around £20 million to improve and upgrade facilities as the primary reason for its closure. The university relocated courses to the Newport City campus and the Cardiff Campus where it invested £14.7 million to extend and upgrade the Atrium building. The campus opened during 1914 and closed for the last time on 31 July 2016, after 102 years.

The university sold the campus for £6.2 million to Redrow for housing development despite the strong opposition to the planned re-development from local residents. The Caerleon Civic Society asked Cadw, the body that looks after historic monuments and buildings in Wales, to give the Edwardian main building Grade II Listed building status to save it from demolition. On 7 August 2016 the Welsh Government announced that they would recommend that the main building, gatehouses and gate-piers be listed as 'buildings of special architectural and historic interest'. The University of South Wales expressed their continued opposition to the proposed listing but the announcement was welcomed by local politicians and the Caerleon Civic Society. Grade II listing of the Main Building, the Principal's Residence, Gate Piers and Caretaker's / Gardener's Lodge was confirmed on 3 March 2017.

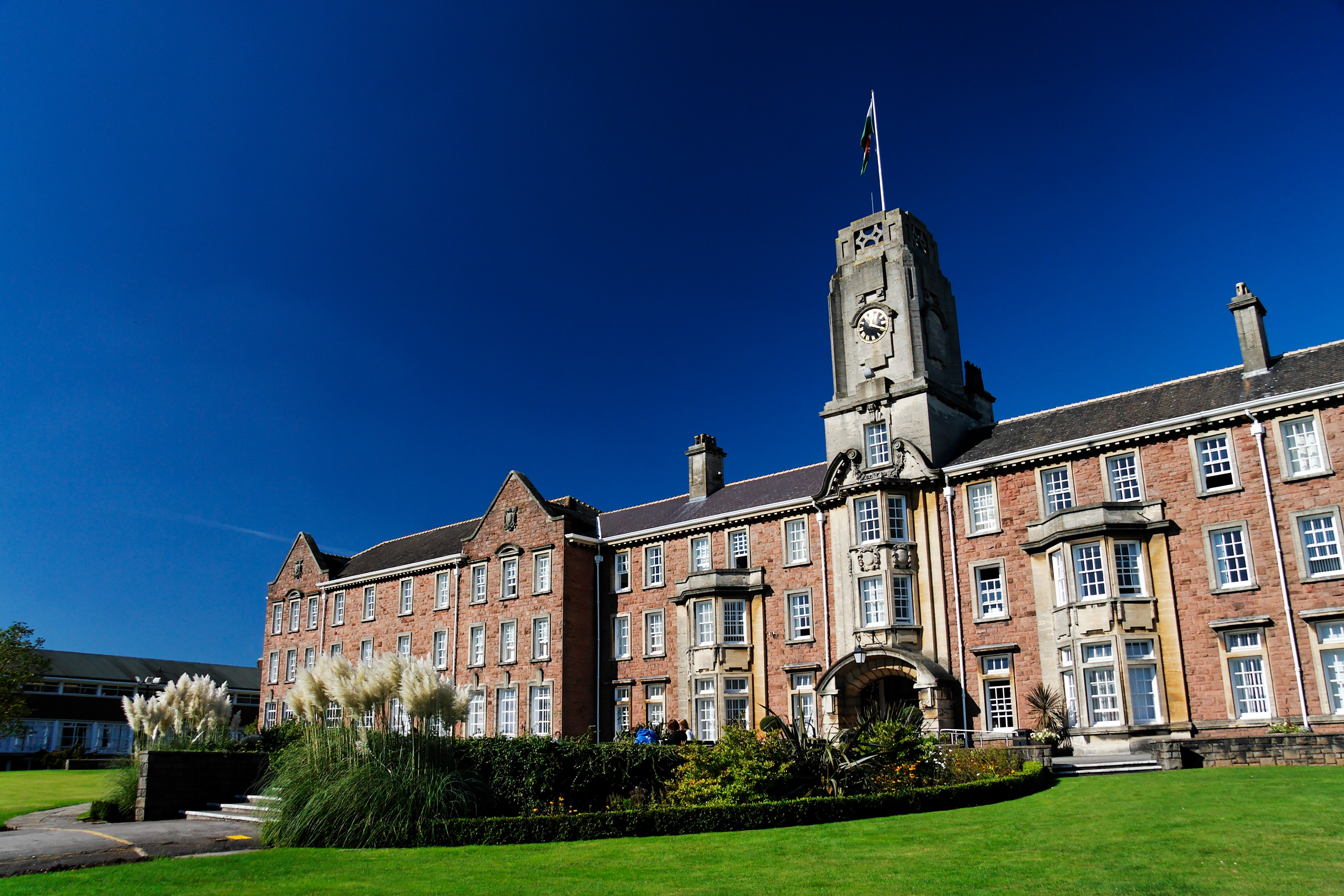

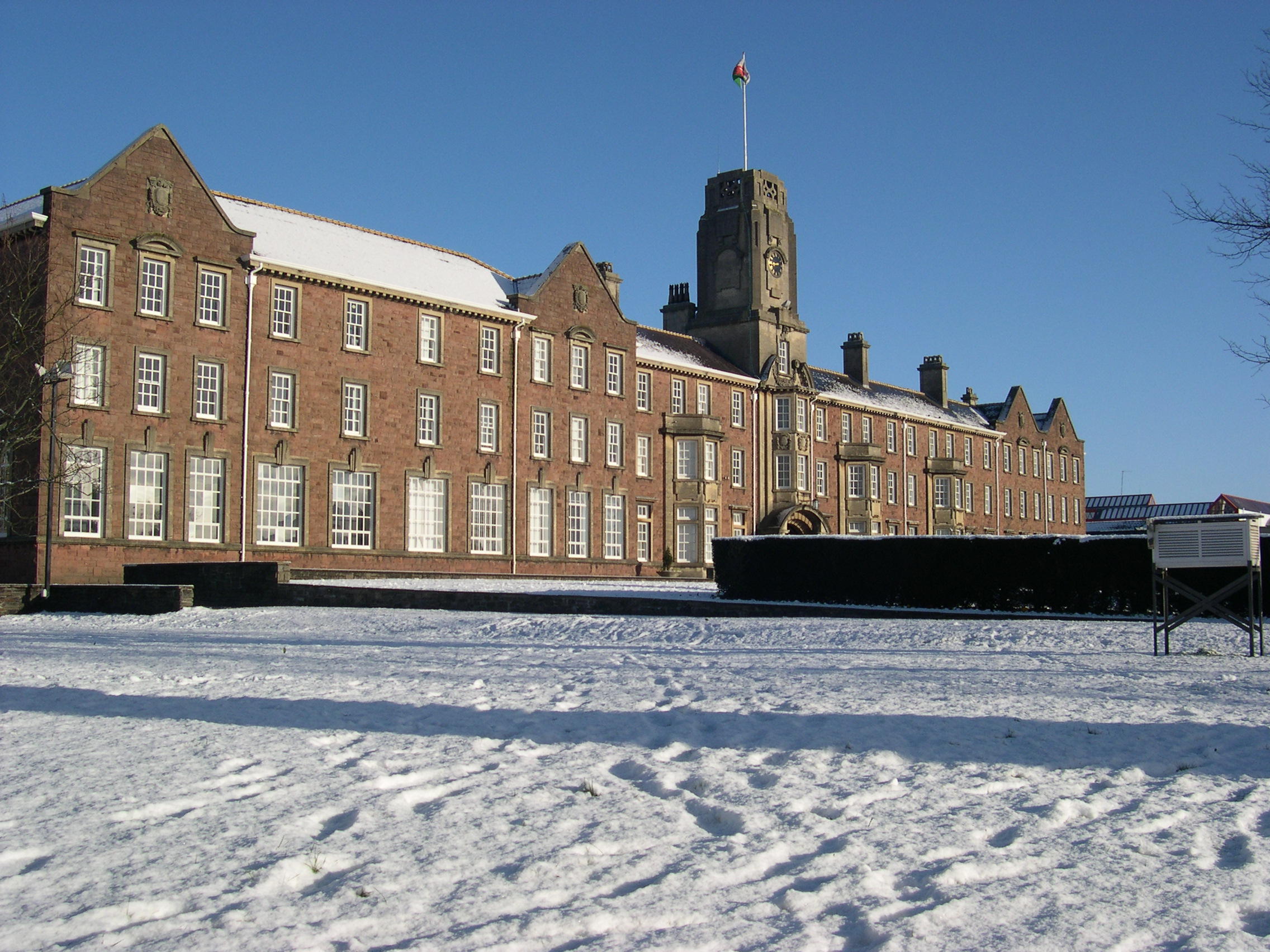

=== Dubai, United Arab Emirates ===
A new campus in Dubai was opened during September 2018 in Dubai South located near Al-Maktoum International Airport. The courses offered were British bachelor's degrees which include Aviation Maintenance Engineering and postgraduate courses including MSc International Logistics and Supply Chain Management.

In 2018 the university was criticised by human rights campaigners when it awarded honorary doctorates to two senior figures in the UAE government, Ahmed bin Saeed Al Maktoum and Nahyan bin Mubarak Al Nahyan, at the campus' opening ceremony.

From September 2020 it was announced that the campus would not accept further applications and would close.

=== London ===
In 2014, USW spent an estimated £300,000 developing a campus in the Docklands area of London, but in January 2015 cancelled the project before taking on any students. The university described this as a test of the market, but cited problems created by new UK visa regulations.

== Academic profile ==
=== Awards ===
The University of Wales, Newport received the 2013 Guardian Higher Education Award (with the University of Glamorgan) for widening participation through its Universities Heads of the Valleys Institute (UHOVI) initiative. The University of Glamorgan was recognised for providing outstanding student support, winning the 2012 Times Higher Award for Outstanding Support to Students.

The former vice-chancellor of the university, Julie Lydon, was appointed an OBE for services to higher education in Wales in the 2014 Queen's Birthday Honours.

=== Rankings and reputation ===
Rankings
National rankings
- Complete (2027): 91
- Guardian (2027): 24
- Times / Sunday Times (2027): 75=

Global rankings
- QS (2027): 1201–1400
- THE (2026): 1201–1500

In 2017, the university entered the top five percent of universities in the world in the Times Higher Education World University Rankings.

In the 2017 National Student Survey the university was placed equal 140th out of 149 universities and institutions surveyed.

The Complete University Guide 2016/7 ranked the university as 99th out of 127 UK universities; the ranking declined to 110th out of 129 UK Universities in 2017/8 but has since risen to 101st.

The university came 81st in the 2022 What Uni Awards.

USW, along with all other Welsh universities, did not participate in the 2023 Teaching Excellence Framework (a government assessment of the quality of undergraduate teaching in English universities and other higher education providers).

USW achieved its highest-ever ranking in the Guardian University Guide 2025, with the University being placed 51st of the 122 institutions on the list. The USW subject with the highest ranking, at fifth, was health professions, while law was USW’s highest climber in the Guide, up 31 places to 19th.

Year	13-14	14-15	15-16	16-17	17–18	18-19	19-20	20-21	21-22	22-23	23-24	24-25
National Student Survey	80%	▼79%	▲80%	▼78%	-	78%	▲83%	▲85%	▼75%	▼75%	-	-
Complete University Guide	91	▼100	▼102	▲99	▼110	-	-	-	-	-	-	-
The Guardian	-	102	▼113	▲111	▼116	▲109	▲98	▲66	▼82	▲53	▼72	▲51
WhatUni? Student Choice Awards	79	▼95	▲8	▼35	▼49	▲26	▼112	-	▲81	-	▼56	-

=== National Cyber Security Academy ===
In 2016, the university launched its National Cyber Security Academy. This academy is a joint venture with industrial partners and Welsh Government and has been recognised by the UK's national security organisation GCHQ.

=== Research ===
The university is one of Wales's five major universities and a member of the St David's Day Group. Its precursor institutions have been recognised for producing some world-leading and internationally excellent research in specialist areas, such as mechanical, aeronautical & manufacturing engineering, social work, social policy & administration, education, history, art and design, nursing and midwifery, architecture and the built environment, English language and literature, communication, cultural & media studies, sports-related studies.

The university has provided a partnership platform for think-tanks such as the Joseph Rowntree Foundation to develop debate on public policy reform in the UK.

The most recent Research Excellence Framework in 2021 found an overall improvement to the university's research performance, with a 49% increase in world leading research since 2014. The university is joint first in the UK for impactful research in Allied Health Professions, Dentistry, Nursing and Pharmacy; in Earth Systems and Environmental Sciences; in Computer Science and Informatics; in Sport and Exercise Sciences, Leisure, and Tourism; in History; in Music, Drama, Dance, Performing Arts, Film and Screen Studies and in Social Work and Social Policy.

== Student life ==
=== Students' Union ===
University of South Wales Students' Union is the students' union of the university. It exists to support and represent the students of the university. It is a member-led organisation and all students are automatically members.

=== Accommodation ===
Pontypridd has halls of residence and facilities on its Treforest campus. Students studying at the university's Cardiff campus have access to private halls of residence, which are shared with the city's other universities. The Newport City building has nearby private student halls of residence.

== Notable alumni ==
=== Artists and photographers ===
- Roger Cecil, painter, mixed media artist
- Maciej Dakowicz, photographer and photojournalist
- Ken Elias, artist
- Tracey Moberly, interdisciplinary artist
- Tish Murtha, documentary photographer

=== Authors and creative writers ===
- Carole Bromley, poet
- Emma Darwin, novelist
- Philip Gross, poet, novelist, playwright and academic
- Paul Groves, poet
- Maria McCann, novelist
- Gareth L. Powell, science fiction author
- Dan Rhodes, writer
- Rachel Trezise, author
- Camilla Way, author
- Tine Wittler, writer and presenter

=== Business and legal ===
- Joe Blackman, entrepreneur, Ambassador of The Princes Trust, CEO of Collection 26
- Christopher Chung Shu-kun, BBS, JP, member of Hong Kong Legislative Council
- Trudy Norris-Grey, Microsoft
- Gemma Hallett, Entrepreneur and Founder of miFuture

=== Film ===
- Gareth Evans, film director and screenwriter
- Philip John, director and screenwriter
- Kirk Jones, film director and screenwriter
- Rahul Sadasivan, film maker and screenwriter
- Asif Kapadia, film maker
- Justin Kerrigan, writer and director
- Teddy Soeriaatmadja, film director
- Scott Barley, film maker

=== Healthcare professionals ===
- Sue Bale OBE, Director of South East Wales Academic Health Science Partnership

=== Media personalities and performers ===
- Jayde Adams, comedian, actor, writer and singer
- Behnaz Akhgar, weather presenter
- Max Boyce MBE, entertainer
- Lorna Dunkley, newsreader and presenter
- Ben Green, comedy actor
- Harry Greene, television personality
- Mark Labbett, TV personality
- Nicola Miles-Wildin, performer

=== Musicians ===
- Richard James Burgess, producer, musician, digital music innovator
- Martin Goldschmidt, co-founder and managing director of UK independent record label Cooking Vinyl
- Mike Howlett, musician and music producer
- Jon Maguire, songwriter and former member of duo Lilygreen & Maguire
- Sion Russell Jones, singer and songwriter
- Ian Watkins, singer from rock band Lostprophets and convicted child sex offender
- Holding Absence - UK Rock Band

=== Politicians ===
- Kevin Brennan, politician
- Suzy Davies
- Lee Dillon, MP for Newbury
- Jill Evans, MEP for Wales
- Catherine Thomas
- Leanne Wood, former party leader of Plaid Cymru
- Emma Wools, South Wales Police and Crime Commissioner

=== Scientists ===
- Randii Wessen

=== Sports people ===
- Matthew Jarvis, rugby player
- Rupert Moon, rugby player and businessman
- Darren Morris, rugby player
- Gemma Hallett, rugby union player
- Jamie Robinson, rugby player
- Nigel Walker, former Olympian and rugby player for Wales, National Director at the English Institute of Sport

== See also ==
- Armorial of UK universities
- Education in Wales
- List of universities in Wales
- List of UK universities
- Post-1992 universities
