= Beyond the Border Storytelling Festival =

Arts festival

Beyond The Border Wales International Storytelling Festival
- Genre: Storytelling / Spoken Word / World Music
- Locations: Dinefwr Castle, Wales
- Years active: 1993 – present
- Website: www.beyondtheborder.com

Beyond The Border Wales International Storytelling Festival is a Wales-based international arts festival dedicated to celebrating the retelling of the world’s traditional stories.

Begun in 1993, the festival is held every other year over the first weekend in July. The new location of the Festival is now at National Trust, Dinefwr, Carmarthenshire. Along with performances of world myth, legend and folktale, the festival features music, poetry, cinema, dance, theatre and puppetry, together with world food stalls, workshops, Craft Market and bookshops.

Funded by Arts Council of Wales, Creative Europe, FEST and the Major Events Status by the Welsh Government.

In addition to the biennial festival weekend, Beyond The Border runs an active year-round programme of storytelling events and community activities, aimed at raising awareness of the art of performance storytelling and the world’s common heritage of traditional stories.

According to Companies House, the company running this event was dissolved on 24th August 2024 so is no longer active.
