= Ricardo Gómez Pérez =

Venezuelan photographer (born 1952)

Ricardo Gómez Pérez (born 27 May 1952) is a Venezuelan photographer. His work has been presented in galleries throughout the world, including exhibitions in France, Sweden, Japan, Netherlands, Belgium, and the United States. One of his most notable artistic works is "Primeros Pasos" (First Steps), which is a series of black and white photographs of his children with slightly out of focus backgrounds. He worked in Europe starting in the early 1970s until he returned to Venezuela in 1987. He currently works with his partner Ricardo Jiménez under the name of RICAR-2. The duo specializes in corporate portraits and photographs for magazines such as Global Finance, BusinessWeek, Voyageur Magazine, Gatopardo, Gerente, Complot Magazine, and Ocean Drive.

== Career ==
Gómez Pérez was born on 27 May 1952 in Caracas, Venezuela. In 1972, he studied gravure, design, serigraphy, and photography at "Taller 4 Rojo" in Bogotá, Colombia. At this time, he bought his first camera, a Lubitel 6x6, and took his first professional photographs, which were later printed in Issue No. 8 of European Photography Magazine. During this period, he also hitchhiked across Colombia, Ecuador, and Peru. In 1972, he moved to London and bought a Nikkormat. There he studied English and continued to work on the techniques he learned in Bogotá. Later, he traveled to Zurich, where he shot his first black and white photographs, a series of empty landscapes filled with snow.

In 1974, he worked during the day in a vegetarian restaurant and studied part-time at the Sir John Cass College of Art in London. There, under the guidance of Mick Williamson, Gómez Pérez began to build a portfolio of photographs taken in Zurich. During a demonstration of Teddy Boys, an Edwardian revivalist subculture, at Hyde Park, London, he began to photographically document their community. Those pictures began a portfolio, which he would later, in 1976, present for acceptance to the London College of Printing. Later in 1976, he also worked with Charles Harbutt at The Photographer's Place in Derbyshire.

In 1977, he continued his earlier research on the Teddy Boys community and began to photograph them all over Great Britain. In 1978, Gómez Pérez made his first trip to Barcelona, Spain to exhibit "Teddy Boys in London", where he met Joan Fontcuberta. During the same period, he started the series "Encuentros", a series of black and white photographs taken with a Leica CL, which he bought from Paulo Nozolino at London College of Printing. The same year, he met Kim Nygaard, Ricardo Jiménez, and Manuel Álvarez Bravo at The Photographers' Gallery in London.

=== Independent work ===
In 1979, Gómez Pérez finished his studies at London College of Printing. During his final exhibit at the college, he met Brian Griffin, who suggested that they begin working together. The pair they went on to do work for several music and rock groups, including Iggy Pop, Lene Lovich, Echo and the Bunnymen, Ultravox, Peter Gabriel, and Ian Dury. At this time, Gómez Pérez was also doing freelance photography for London magazines, such as New Society, Campaign, and Management Today. During this period, he met Andreas Müller-Pohle, who asked him to be a correspondent for European Photography Magazine, and he also met Richard Misrach at the Photographer's Gallery. Until 1982, he worked as a freelance photographer in London, primarily for Management Today, where he was guided by art director Roland Schenk. At this time, he began to take portraits of businessmen and editorials for several London publications.

In 1982, after ten years in London, Gómez Pérez moved to Paris. There he met Graciela Iturbide and Pedro Meyer, and all three exhibited together at Studio 666 in Paris as part of a Latin American photography exhibition. Additionally, various solo exhibitions also took him across Europe, throughout Germany, Switzerland, the Netherlands, Sweden, Norway, and Spain.

In 1984, with the support of David Balsells and Chantal Grande of Galería Forvm, he moved to Tarragona, Spain. The trio then exhibited throughout Spain. While there, Gómez Pérez was the curator of "Semana International de la Fotografia", in Guadalajara, Spain. Subsequently, he traveled to Lisbon, Portugal where he stayed with his friend Paulo Nozolino. In 1987, he decided to go back to Caracas after 12 years of being abroad, to spend time with his mother.

=== Return to Caracas ===
Gómez Pérez obtained a grant from the Venezuelan Culture Ministry to continue his work photographing urban Caracas. After one year and with the aid of a Pentax 6x7, he had taken thirty landscapes. In 1987 he began work with Ricardo Jimenez as a freelance photographer team, which they named: RICAR-2. Together they worked taking portraits of Venezuelan businessmen, and later started to work for Revista Gerente, thus producing a large portfolio of portraits.

In 1992, Gómez Pérez limited edition portfolio, Memento, in collaboration with Andreas Muller-Pohle, Joan Fontcuberta, John Webb, Philippe Scholz-Ritterman, Arno Jansen, and Bernard Plossu, which was dedicated to the memory of a common friend, Derek Bennet. Later that year, Gómez Pérez was invited to Fotofest, a photography fair in Houston, Texas. He was invited to the fair again in 1994, at which he attended The Global Environment exhibit. He later received support from Polaroid to work on a series of black and white photographs, and he later, separately, began a series of nudes and portraits of women.

In 1991, Gómez Pérez's first son with his wife, Gisela Viloria, was born and named Mauricio. Two years later, in July 1993, Samuel and Nicolás, his twin sons, were born. In 1994, the new father began a series of photographs. The resulting portfolio was called Primeros pasos (First Steps) and is composed of out of focus, black and white pictures of his sons.

In 1994 the first issue of Extra Camera Magazine was published. Gómez Pérez worked as a coordinator of the quarterly magazine between 1994 and 1998.

In 1997, Gómez Pérez curated the first exhibition of Robert Mapplethorpe at the Museo Alejandro Otero in Caracas.

In 2001, he was invited by Pedro Meyer to exhibit part of his First Steps portfolio at ZoneZero.

At present, he lives with his family in Caracas, and works as a freelance photographer under the firm RICAR-2 with Ricardo Jiménez. He also continues to work on his personal artwork.

== Collections ==
- Centre National d'Art et de Culture Georges Pompidou, Paris, France
- Fotografiska Museet, Stockholm, Sweden.
- Museum Nicephore Niépce, France.
- Museum für Kunst und Gewerbe Hamburg, Germany.
- Bibliothèque nationale de France, Paris, France.
- J. Paul Getty Museum, San Francisco, United States.
- The Royal Bibliothèque, Copenhagen, Denmark.
- Forvn Gallery Collection, Tarragona, Spain.

== Awards ==
- 1979: First Prize, Asahi Pentax Award, London, United Kingdom.

== Exhibitions ==
=== Solo exhibitions ===
- 1976: Swiss Landscapes, Battersea Arts Center, London, United Kingdom.
- 1978: Teds in London, Galería Process, Barcelona, Spain.
- 1979: Teds in London, National Poetry Gallery, London, United Kingdom.
- 1980: Teds in London, Photographer's Gallery, Saskatoon, Canada.
- 1981: Encuentros, Novun Gallery, Hannover, Germany.
- 1982:

Encuentros, Galería Forvm, Tarragona, Spain.
Encuentros, Contrast Gallery, London, United Kingdom.
Encuentros, Studio 666, Paris, France.

- 1983:

Encuentros, Galerie Junod, Lausanne, France.
Encuentros, Camera Obscura Galerie, Stockholm, Suecia.

- 1984:

Encuentros, Nikon Gallery, Zurich, Switzerland.
Nudes, Centre Culturel de Bretigny, France.
Teddy Boys dans la Cite, FNAC Galleries, France.

- 1985: Encuentros, Galeria Visor, Valencia, Spain.
- 1997: Primeros pasos, Tijuana Cultural Center, Fotoseptiembre, Mexico.

== Publications ==
- Curated by Castellote, Alejandro (2004), Mapas Abiertos, Fotografía Latinoamericana 1991–2002, Spain: Lunwerg Editores, ISBN 978-84-7782-942-3
- Nueve Miradas: Bigott en sus 80 años, Caracas, Venezuela: Fundación Bigott, 2001, ISBN 978-980-6428-26-3
- Curated by Bracho, Edmundo (1998), Ten Contemporary Venezuelan Photographers: "De-Centering Visions". Lehigh University, Bethlehem, Pennsylvania, USA: Du Bois Gallery.
- Curated by Gómez Pérez, Ricardo (1997), Robert Mapplethorpe Catalog, Caracas Venezuela: Museo Alejandro Otero.
- Auer, Michel; Auer Michele (1997), Encyclopédie internationale des photographes des débuts à nos jours, [CD-Rom] Neuchâtel, Switzerland: Éditions Ides et Calendes.
- Watriss, Wendy; Baldwin, Fred (1994), The Global Environment, Houston, USA; Fotofest'94.
- Müller-Pohle, Andreas (Vol. 13, nr.3, 1992), European Photography #51 Gottigen, Germany.
- Borhan, Pierre (1990), La photographie a la croisee des chemins, Paris, France; La Manufacture, ISBN 978-2-7377-0233-4
- (1990), 150 Years of Photography, Stockholm, Sweden; Fotografiska Museet.
- Müller-Pohle, Andreas (Vol. 10, nr.4, 1992), European Photography #40 Gottigen, Germany.
- Curated by Merewheter, Charles (1987), A Marginal Body, The Photographic Image in Latin America, Sydney, Australia; The Australian Centre for Photography.
- (1985), Popular Photography: Photography Annual 1985, New York City; Ziff-Davis Publishing Company.
- Auer, Michel; Auer, Michele (1985), Photographers Encyclopedia International, Geneve Switzerland; Camera Obscura, ISBN 978-2-903671-04-4
- Kohler, Michael (1985), Das Akfoto, Munich, Germany; Museum fur Kunst
- (1985), Art Das Kunstmagazin, Hamburg, Germany; Gruner Und Jahr Ag & Co.
- Lemagny, Jean-Claude (1984), La photographie creative, Paris, France; Contrejour, ISBN 978-2-85949-058-4
- (1982), Floods of Light: Flash Photography 1851–1981, London, UK; Photographers Gallery, ISBN 978-0-907879-01-5
- Naggar, Carole (1982), Dictionnaire des Photographes, Paris, France; Editions du Seuil, ISBN 978-2-02-006288-6
- Müller-Pohle, Andreas (Vol. 2, nr.4, 1981), European Photography #8 Gottigen, Germany.
- Müller-Pohle, Andreas (Vol. 1, nr.1, 1980), European Photography #1 Gottigen, Germany.
- (1979) Zoom Magazine #6, London, UK.
- (1979), British Journal of Photography Annual, London, UK.
