= Bob Mazzer =

British photographer

Bob Mazzer (born 1948) is a British street photographer, living in St Leonards-on-Sea. His photographs of people on the London Underground were collected in the book Underground (2014). Mazzer has also photographed people in Hastings and St Leonards-on-Sea. He had a retrospective exhibition at Hastings Museum and Art Gallery, in 2022.

== Life and work ==
Mazzer was born in Whitechapel, London. He studied graphic design at Hornsey College of Art in London.

Mazzer photographed people on the London Underground in the 1970s and 1980s as he commuted to his job working as a projectionist at a porn cinema, and later. 40 years of these photographs were published in the book Underground (2014).

He has since moved to St Leonards-on-Sea. His book Bob Mazzer (2020), a retrospective of work from the 1960s to the present day, includes "Underground images; hippie life in Wales; life in France; expanding life in the USA and local life in Hastings" and St Leonards. In Sussex (2022) includes photographs again from Hastings and St Leonards, as well as the surrounding countryside.

== Publications ==
- Underground. Spitalfields Life, 2014. ISBN 978-0957656932.
- Bob Mazzer. London: Unicorn, 2020. With a foreword by Will Self. ISBN 978-1912690602.
- In Sussex. London: Unicorn, 2022. ISBN 9781914414381. With a foreword by Eamonn McCabe. Published to coincide with an exhibition at Hastings Museum and Art Gallery.
- Tube. Hastings: Silverhill, 2022.

== Exhibitions ==
=== Solo exhibitions ===
- Bob Mazzer: Underground, Howard Griffin Gallery, London, 2014
- Bob Mazzer in Camera: a Retrospective, Hastings Museum and Art Gallery, Hastings, 20 January 2022 – 17 April 2022

=== Group exhibitions ===
- New Work in Britain: Aspects of Photography in Britain Today, The Photographers' Gallery, London, 1981. With Ricardo Gómez Pérez, Martin Parr, and others.

== Films ==
- Bob Mazzer: Underground & Other Pictures (FullBleed, 2015) – documentary directed by Richard Butchins
