= Adelheid Mers =

German visual artist and academic

Adelheid Mers (born 1960, Düsseldorf) is a German visual artist and academic. She is a professor and the Chair of the Department of Arts Administration and Policy at the School of the Art Institute of Chicago. As an artist, Mers works through Performative Diagrammatics, a practice that includes elements of installation, facilitation with publics, and video. Her research draws on close work with others, exploring arts ecologies, and knowing differently, or epistemic diversity. Work takes place nationally and internationally, for example in residency, conference and exhibition settings.

== Education ==
Mers received an MFA in 1986 from the Kunstakademie Düsseldorf, Germany. She studied with Tony Cragg, Klaus Rinke, Günther Uecker and did course work in German Literature, Linguistics, Philosophy, Pedagogy, Didactics, Philosophy at University of Düsseldorf, University of Cologne, Germany. Mers continued her studies in 1989-1990 at the University of Chicago where she was a student at large, Graduate School, Committee on the Visual Arts, in association with a grant from the DAAD (German Academic Exchange Service).

== Interviews ==
- ChicagoArts Interview with Artist Adelheid Mers
- art21 Inside the Artist's Studio 1
- art21 Inside the Artist's Studio 2

== Editorial projects ==
- Mers, Adelheid and Quiroz, Daniel Jimenez. Editors. 2021. "For a New Gentleness". With essays by Maria Iñigo Clavo and Benvenuto Chavajay Ixtetelá, Alejandro Ponce de León, Işıl Eğrikavuk, Tyanif Rico Rodríguez on Manuela Infante, and Juan Pablo Pacheco Bejarano. CSPA Quarterly, Center for Sustainable Practices in the Arts. Vol 33. (print and online)
- 2009 editor, "Useful Pictures", Whitewalls (distributed through University of Chicago Press)

== Authored texts ==
- Mers, Adelheid. 2021. "Performative Topologies". (Special Issue Flesh Circuits edited by Connor Mcgarrigle, El Putnam.) International Journal of Performance Arts and Digital Media. http://dx.doi.org/10.1080/14794713.2021.1934635 (print and online)
- Mers, Adelheid. 2021. "Stalking the Continuum". In Understanding Flusser, Understanding Modernism edited by Aaron Jaffe, Michael F. Miller, Rodrigo Martini. Bloomsbury. (print and online)
- Mers, Adelheid. 2021. “Performative Diagrammatics: An Artistic Exploration of the Relation Between Epistemic Diversity and Systemic Elasticity.” Global Performance Studies, vol. 4, no. 1. https://doi.org/10.33303/gpsv4n1a6 (online)
- Mers, Adelheid. 2021. “The BRAID: Moving Across Dimensions from Representation to Performativity.” In Exploring Dispositifs edited by Birte Kleine-Benne. Berlin: Logos Verlag. https://www.logos-verlag.de/ebooks/OA/978-3-8325-5197-1.pdf (print and online open access)
- Mers, Adelheid. 2020. "The Braid" and "Performative Topologies". Organized and edited by Emma Cocker, Alexander Damianisch, Lena Séraphin, Cordula Daus. Language-based practice within the field of artistic research. In Practice Sharing research platform: https://www.researchcatalogue.net/view/835089/1021562 (online)
- Mers, Adelheid. 2018. "The Gap begets Two-space: On the practice of Lou Mallozzi", Chicago Artist Writers, https://chicagoartistwriters.com/the-gap-begets-two-space-on-the-practice-of-lou-mallozzi/ (online)
- Mers, Adelheid. 2018. "Artists’ Perspectives on Grant Writing." (Issue Einreichen, edited by Esther Strauss, Matthias Schmidt) Triedere Magazine. Sonderzahl Verlag. Wien. (print)
- Mers, Adelheid. 2017. "Thought Catchers: An Artist Talk". Wissenskulturen im Dialog edited by Doris Ingrisch, Marion Mangeldorf and Gert Dressel. transcript-Verlag. Bielefeld 2017. https://doi.org/10.14361/9783839436981 (print)
- Mers, Adelheid. 2017. "The Braid Diagram and A Critique Template: modeling studio critique as process in support of articulating evolving artistic practices in context". Conference Proceedings Art School Critique 2.0 edited by Richard Jochum. Teachers College Columbia University. (digital)
- Mers, Adelheid. 2015. "Diskussionsmatrix zur Kufsteiner Jahrestagung des Fachverbands Kulturmanagement, 2014" Zeitschrift für Kulturmanagement (1), 109. (print)
- Ingrisch, Doris and Mers, Adelheid. 2014. "Wissenskulturen im Dialog", Performing Translation - Schnittstellen zwischen Kunst, Pädagogik und Wissenschaft edited by Werner Haslitschka. Löcker, Wien (print)
- Mers, Adelheid. 2014. "Flexible Artworlds". Whose Culture Is It, Anyway? edited by Will Garrett-Petts, James Hoffman and Ginny Ratsoy. New Star Books, Canada (print)
- Mers, Adelheid. 2013. "Adapting Techniques of Studio Critique for Arts Management Pedagogy", (Special Issue on Pedagogy) Journal of Arts Management, Law and Society. (print)
- Mers, Adelheid. 2013. "Reading Vilém Flusser in North America: Self-made, Do-it-yourself and Doing-it-together". Temporary Art Review. https://temporaryartreview.com/reading-vilem-flusser-in-north-america-self-made-do-it-yourself-and-doing-it-together/ (online)
- "A Collaborative Fusion", with Elisabeth Condon, NYArts Magazine, September 2001 (print)
- "Present", essay, with Jacqueline Terrassa, accompanying the exhibition at the Hyde Park Art Center, 1997 (print)

== Further resources ==
- Artist website: http://adelheidmers.org/
