= Vilém Flusser =

Czech-born Brazilian philosopher, writer (1920-1991)

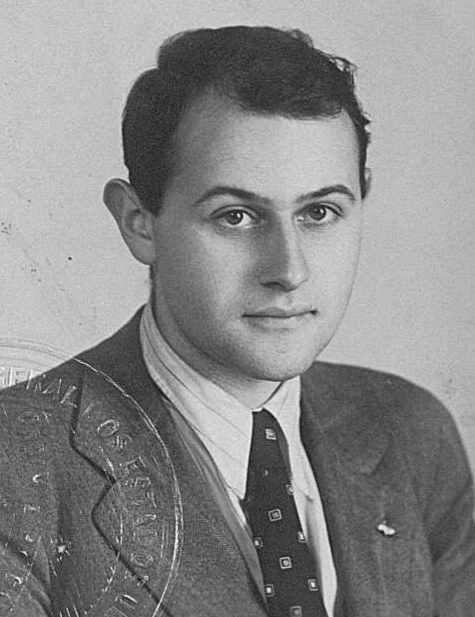
Vilém Flusser, 1940

Vilém Flusser (May 12, 1920 – November 27, 1991) was a Czech-born Brazilian philosopher, writer and journalist, best known for his contributions to media studies, communication theory, and the philosophy of language. He lived for a long period in São Paulo (where he became a Brazilian citizen) and later in France, and his works are written in many different languages.

His early work was marked by discussion of the thought of Martin Heidegger, and by the influence of existentialism and phenomenology. Phenomenology would play a major role in the transition to the later phase of his work, in which he turned his attention to the philosophy of communication and of artistic production. He contributed to the dichotomy logic theory through history: the period of image worship, and period of text worship, with deviations consequently into idolatry and "textolatry".

== Life ==
Flusser was born in 1920 in Prague, Czechoslovakia into a family of Jewish intellectuals. His father, Gustav Flusser, studied mathematics and physics (under Albert Einstein among others). Vilém attended German and Czech primary schools and later a German grammar school.

In 1938, Flusser started to study philosophy at the Juridical Faculty of the Charles University in Prague. In 1939, shortly after the Nazi occupation, Flusser emigrated to London (with Edith Barth, his later wife, and her parents) to continue his studies for one term at the London School of Economics and Political Science. Vilém Flusser lost all of his family in the German concentration camps: his father died in Buchenwald in 1940; his grandparents, his mother and his sister were brought to Theresienstadt and later to Auschwitz where they were killed. The next year, he emigrated to Brazil, living both in São Paulo and Rio de Janeiro. He started working at a Czech import/export company and then at Stabivolt, a manufacturer of radios and transistors.

In 1960 he started to collaborate with the Brazilian Institute of Philosophy (IBF) in São Paulo and published in the Revista Brasileira de Filosofia; by these means he seriously approached the Brazilian intellectual community. Flusser had as his friend and closest interlocutor the Brazilian philosopher Vicente Ferreira da Silva. Flusser and Vicente Ferreira da Silva met in São Paulo in the 1960s and began a close intellectual dialogue that continued until Ferreira da Silva's death in 1963. Flusser wrote several essays on Ferreira da Silva's work and that Ferreira da Silva's concept of "Fundamental ontology” had a significant impact on Flusser's understanding of the nature of reality. During the 60s Flusser published and taught at several schools in São Paulo, being Lecturer for Philosophy of Science at the Escola Politécnica of the University of São Paulo and Professor of Philosophy of Communication at the Escola Dramática and the Escola Superior de Cinema in São Paulo. He also participated actively in the arts, collaborating with the Bienal de São Paulo, among other cultural events.

Beginning in the 1950s he taught philosophy and worked as a journalist, before publishing his first book Língua e realidade (Language and Reality) in 1963. In 1972 he decided to leave Brazil. Some say it was because it was becoming difficult to publish because of the military regime. Others dispute this reason, since his work on communication and language did not threaten the military. In 1970, when a reform took place at the University of São Paulo by the Brazilian military government, all Lecturers of Philosophy (members of the Department of Philosophy) were dismissed. Flusser, who taught at the Engineering School (Escola Politécnica), had to leave the university as well. In 1972 he and his wife Edith settled temporarily in Merano (Tyrol). Further short stays in various European countries followed until they moved to Robion in southern France in 1981, where they remained until Flusser's death in 1991. To the end of his life, he was quite active writing and giving lectures around media theory and working with new topics (Philosophy of Photography, Technical Images, etc.). He died in 1991 in a car accident near the Czech–German border, while trying to visit his native city, Prague, to give a lecture.

Vilém Flusser is the cousin of David Flusser.

== Philosophy ==
Flusser's essays are short, provocative and lucid, with a resemblance to the style of journalistic articles. Critics have noted he is less a 'systematic' thinker than a 'dialogic' one, purposefully eclectic and provocative (Cubitt 2004). However, his early books, written in the 1960s, primarily in Portuguese, and published in Brazil, have a slightly different style.

Flusser's writings relate to each other, however, which means that he intensively works over certain topics and dissects them into a number of brief essays. His main topics of interest were: epistemology, ethics, aesthetics, ontology, language philosophy, semiotics, philosophy of science, the history of Western culture, the philosophy of religion, the history of symbolic language, technology, writing, the technical image, photography, migration, media and literature, and, especially in his later years, the philosophy of communication and of artistic production.

His writings reflect his wandering life: although the majority of his work was written in German and Portuguese, he also wrote in English and French, with scarce translation to other languages. Because Flusser's writings in different languages are dispersed in the form of books, articles or sections of books, his work as a media philosopher and cultural theorist is only now becoming more widely known. The first book by Flusser to be published in English was Towards a Philosophy of Photography in 1984 by the then new journal European Photography, which was his own translation of the work. The Shape of Things, was published in London in 1999 and was followed by a new translation of Towards a Philosophy of Photography.

Flusser's archives have been held by the Academy of Media Arts in Cologne and are currently housed at the Berlin University of the Arts.

=== Philosophy of photography ===
Writing about photography in the 1970s and 80s, in the face of the early worldwide impact of computer technologies, Flusser argued that the photograph was the first in a number of technical image forms to have fundamentally changed the way in which the world is seen. Historically, the importance of photography had been that it introduced nothing less than a new epoch: 'The invention of photography constitutes a break in history that can only be understood in comparison to that other historical break constituted by the invention of linear writing.'

Whereas ideas might previously have been interpreted in terms of their written form, photography heralded new forms of perceptual experience and knowledge. As Flusser Archive Supervisor Claudia Becker describes, "For Flusser, photography is not only a reproductive imaging technology, it is a dominant cultural technique through which reality is constituted and understood". In this context, Flusser argued that photographs have to be understood in strict separation from 'pre-technical image forms'. For example, he contrasted them to paintings which he described as images that can be sensibly 'decoded', because the viewer is able to interpret what he or she sees as more or less direct signs of what the painter intended. By contrast, even though photography produces images that seem to be 'faithful reproductions' of objects and events they cannot be so directly 'decoded'. The crux of this difference stems, for Flusser, from the fact that photographs are produced through the operations of an apparatus. And the photographic apparatus operates in ways that are not immediately known or shaped by its operator. For example, he described the act of photographing as follows:

The photographer's gesture as the search for a viewpoint onto a scene takes place within the possibilities offered by the apparatus. The photographer moves within specific categories of space and time regarding the scene: proximity and distance, bird- and worm's-eye views, frontal- and side-views, short or long exposures, etc. The Gestalt of space–time surrounding the scene is prefigured for the photographer by the categories of his camera. These categories are an a priori for him. He must 'decide' within them: he must press the trigger.

Roughly put, the person using a camera might think that they are operating its controls to produce a picture that shows the world the way they want it to be seen, but it is the pre-programmed character of the camera that sets the parameters of this act and it is the apparatus that shapes the meaning of the resulting image. Given the central role of photography to almost all aspects of contemporary life, the programmed character of the photographic apparatus shapes the experience of looking at and interpreting photographs as well as most of the cultural contexts in which we do so.

Flusser developed a lexicon of terms that have proven influential and that continue to be useful for thinking about contemporary photography, digital imaging technologies and their online uses. These include: the 'apparatus' (a tool that changes the meaning of the world in contrast to what he calls mechanical tools that work to change the world itself); the 'functionary' (the photographer or operator of the camera who is bound by the rules it sets); the 'programme' (a 'system in which chance becomes necessity' and a game 'in which every virtuality, even the least probable, will be realized of necessity if the game is played for a sufficiently long time'); the 'technical image' (the first example of which is the photograph, with its particular kind of significant surface that looks like a traditional image but harbours encoded and obscure concepts that cannot be 'immediately' deciphered). While Flusser did write a number of short essays on the work of specific photographers, his major focus was the critical and philosophical need to understand late 20th-century media culture and the emergent possibilities and threats presented by the larger forces at work in an increasingly technical and automated world. Flusser's Vampyroteuthis Infernalis has also been interpreted as a fable about photography.

Concept of Home and Homelessness

Flusser was deeply influenced by the loss of his native Prague, and his relocations throughout his life which can be seen in his writings and causing him to proclaim his homelessness, "because there are so many homelands that make their home in me". His personal biography was particularly helpful for his studies in interpersonal communication and how to facilitate it. Communication, which are the gaps between different positions, is part of a cultural phenomenon relying on unconsciously learnt patterns at home. Language therein is a major influence on one's thinking. Flusser asked what are the consequences of the loss of one's home and traditional connections? He differentiated between the two meanings of home originating in the German language, "Heimat" understood as a homeland and "Wohnung" understood as in house, and argued that home cannot be understood as an eternal value transcending time and space. A person is bound to its "Heimat" through invisible threads such as connections to people, tradition and language, which all lay beyond the consciousness. Only when a person is removed from their home they become aware of the ties which reveal themselves as unconscious judgements. These unconscious "habits prevent bits of information from being perceived" and make the habitual environment comfortable and therefore pretty. For Flusser this substantiates the "love for a fatherland".

The homeless person must not only consciously learn the habits of a new home but also must forget them again as if they become conscious, these habits reveal themselves as banal, threatening to expose the true nature of the home of the natives. The developing polemic dialog distinguishes between the "ugly stranger" who can unveil the truth (Aletheia) and the "beautiful native" who fears the otherness as it threatens their habit. Flusser used his experience in Brazil during a time of massive immigration to demonstrate the possibility to set oneself free of the unconscious habits of the homeland to form new voluntary connections which lead up to the creation of a new homeland.

However, opposed to the homeland one can free himself off, the home understood as in house is a necessary part of human existence. It gives a person the mental ability to process information as it divides the sphere of existence into habit or home and unusual or new information. The habitual environment is a prerequisite to recognize the unusual which comes into one's home. Flusser refers in this regard to Hegel's dialectic analysis between home and the unusual or generally speaking of consciousness.

== Works ==
=== Monographs ===
- Angenommen. Eine Szenenfolge, Göttingen: Immatrix, 1989.
  - What If? Twenty-Two Scenarios in Search of Images, trans. Anke Finger and Kenneth Kronenberg, University of Minnesota Press, 2022.
- Das XX. Jahrhundert. Versuch einer subjektiven Synthese, 1950s, c200 pp. Unpublished. (in German)
- Língua e realidade, São Paulo: Herder, 1963, 238 pp; São Paulo: Annablume, 2004; 2009, 232 pp. (in Portuguese)
  - Jazyk a skutečnost, trans Karel Palek, Triáda, 2005, 200 pp. Introduction. (in Czech)
  - Language and Reality, trans Rodrigo Maltez Novaes, Univ Of Minnesota Press, 2018, 220pp. (in English)
- A história do diabo, São Paulo: Martins, 1965, 216 pp; São Paulo: Annablume, 2010. (in Portuguese)
  - Die Geschichte des Teufels, ed. Andreas Müller-Pohle, Göttingen: European Photography, 1993; 2nd ed., 1996, 200 pp. (in German)
  - Příběh ďábla, trans. Jiří Fiala, Galerie Gema, 1997, 185 pp. (in Czech)
  - The History of the Devil, trans. Rodrigo Maltez Novaes, Univocal, 2014, 220 pp.
- Da religiosidade: a literatura e o senso de realidade, São Paulo: Conselho estadual de cultura, 1967, 147 pp; São Paulo: Escrituras, 2002. (in Portuguese)
- La force du quotidien, trans. Jean Mesrie and Barbara Niceall, Paris: Mame, 1973, 146 pp; 1989. Preface by Abraham Moles. (in French). Review.
- Le monde codifié, Conférence du 3 Mai 1973, Paris: Institut de l'Environment/Centre de Formation Permanente pour les Arts Plastiques, 1974, 48 pp. (in French)
  - O mundo codificado, São Paulo: Cosacnaify, 2007. (in Portuguese)
- Orthonature/Paranature, Institut Scientifique de recherche paranaturaliste, 1978. (in French)
- Natural:mente: vários acessos ao significado da natureza, São Paulo: Duas Cidades, 1979, 148 pp; 2011, 164 pp. (in Portuguese)
  - Vogelflüge: Essays zu Natur und Kultur, Munich: Carl Hanser, 2000, 136 pp. (in German)
  - Natural:Mind, trans. Rodrigo Maltez Novaes, Univocal, 2013, 150 pp.
- Pós-história: vinte istantâneos e um modo de usar, São Paulo: Duas Cidades, 1983, 168 pp. (in Portuguese)
  - Post-History, trans. Rodrigo Maltez Novaes, Univocal, 2013, 167 pp.
- Für eine Philosophie der Fotografie, European Photography, 1983, 58 pp; 1989; 1997; 2006. (in German)
  - Towards A Philosophy of Photography, ed. Derek Bennett, Göttingen: European Photography, 1984, 62 pp.
  - Filosofia da caixa preta. Ensaios para uma futura filosofia da fotografia, trans. Vilém Flusser, São Paulo: Hucitec, 1985, 92 pp; Rio de Janeiro: Relume Dumara, 2002. (in Portuguese)
  - Per una filosofia della fotografia, trans. Chantal Marazia, Torino: Agorà, 1987; Milan: Bruno Mondadori, 2006, 128 pp. (in Italian) Review.
  - For fotografiets filosofi, Horten: Preus Fotomuseum, 1987. (in Norwegian)
  - En filosofi för fotografin, trans. Jan-Erik Lundström, Göteborg: Korpen, 1988, 112 pp. (in Swedish)
  - Hacia una filosofía de la fotografía, trans. Eduardo Molina, 1990. (in Spanish)
  - A fotográfia filozófiája, trans. Panka Veress and István Sebesi, Budapest: Tartóshullám – Belvedere – ELTE BTK, 1990. (in Hungarian)
  - Bir fotoğraf felsefesine doğru, Istanbul: Agac, 1991; Ankara: Med-Campus, 1994; trans. Ihsan Derman, Istanbul: Hayalbaz Kitap, 2009, 97 pp. (in Turkish)
  - 写真の哲学のために : テクノロジーとヴィジュアルカルチャー, trans. Fukagawa Masafumi, Tokyo: Keiso Shobo, 1992; 1999. (in Japanese)
  - Za filosofii fotografie, trans. Božena Koseková and Josef Kosek, 1994; 2nd ed., trans. Božena and Josef Kosek, Prague: Fra, 2013, 104 pp. (in Czech)
  - Taipei: Yuan-Liou, 1994. (in Chinese)
  - Pour une philosophie de la photographie, Paris: Circé, 1996. (in French)
  - Ensaio sobre a fotografia: para uma filosofia da técnica, Lisbon: Relógio d'Água, 1998. (in Portuguese)
  - Thessaloniki: University Studio Press, 1998. (in Greek)
  - 사진의 철학을 위하여, Seoul: Communication Books, 1999. (in Korean)
  - Za filozofiju fotografije, trans. Tijana Tubić, Belgrade: Kulturni Centar Beograda, 1999; 2005, 80 pp. (in Serbian)
  - Towards A Philosophy of Photography, trans. Anthony Mathews, London: Reaktion Books, 2000.
  - Una filosofía de la fotografía, Madrid: Síntesis, 2001, 192 pp. (in Spanish)
  - Za edna filosofia na fotografiata, Plovdiv: Horizonti, 2002. (in Bulgarian)
  - Pentru o filosofie a fotografie, Bucharest: Idea Design & Print, 2003. (in Romanian)
  - Za edna filosofia na fotografira, Moscow, 2002. (in Russian)
  - Ku filozofii fotografii, trans. Jacek Maniecki, Katowice: Akademia Sztuk Pięknych w Katowicach, 2004; Warszawa: Wydawnictwo Aletheia, 2015. (in Polish)
  - Filozofija Fotografije, Zagreb: Scarabeus, 2007. (in Croatian)
  - Een filosofie van de fotografie, Utrecht: Uitgeverij Ijzer, 2007. (in Dutch)
  - Za filosofiyu fotografii [За философию фотографии], trans. G. Khaydarova, St. Petersburg: St. Petersburg State University, 2008, 146 pp. (in Russian)
  - K filozofiji fotografije, Ljubljana: ZSKZ, 2010. (in Slovenian)
- Ins Universum der technischen Bilder, Göttingen: European Photography, 1985; 1992; 1996. (in German)
  - A technikai képek univerzuma felé, trans. József Maleczki, 2001; revised trans. Dalma Török, 2011. (in Hungarian)
  - Do universa technických obrazů, trans. Jiří Fiala, Prague: OSVU, 2002, 162 pp. (in Czech)
  - O universo das imagens tecnicas. Elogio da superficialidade, São Paulo: Annablume, 2010. (in Portuguese)
  - Into the Universe of Technical Images, trans. Nancy Ann Roth, University of Minnesota Press, 2011, 224 pp
  - Hacia el universo de las imagenes technicas, Mexico City: Universidad Nacional Autonoma de Mexico, 2011. (in Spanish)
- Die Schrift, Göttingen: Immatrix Publications, 1987, as a book and on 2 floppy disks; repr. as Die Schrift. Hat Schreiben Zukunft?, Göttingen: European Photography, 2002. (in German)
  - Az írás. Van-e jövője az írásnak?, trans. J.A. Tillmann and Lídia Jósvai, Balassi Kiadó – BAE Tartóshullám – Intermedia, 1997. (in Hungarian)
  - 글쓰기에 미래는 있는가, Seoul: Imprima Korea Agency, 1998. (in Korean)
  - A Escrita. Ha futuro para a escrita?, São Paulo: Annablume, 2010. (in Portuguese)
  - Does Writing Have a Future?, trans. Nancy Ann Roth, University of Minnesota Press, 2011, 208 pp.
- with Louis Bec, Vampyroteuthis infernalis. Eine Abhandlung samt Befund des Institut Scientifique de Recherche Paranaturaliste, Göttingen: Immatrix Publications, 1987, 65 pp; Göttingen: European Photography, 2002. (in German)
  - Vampyroteuthis infernalis, São Paulo: Annablume, 2011. (in Portuguese)
  - Vampyroteuthis Infernalis, trans. Rodrigo Maltez Novaes, New York: Atropos, 2011, 160 pp. Foreword by Abraham A. Moles.
  - Vampyroteuthis Infernalis: A Treatise, with a Report by the Institut Scientifique de Recherche Paranaturaliste, University of Minnesota Press, 2012, 112 pp.
- Krise der Linearität, ed. G.J. Lischka, Bern: Benteli, 1988, 43 pp. (in German). Lecture delivered on March 20, 1988, at Kunstmuseum Bern.
  - "The Crisis of Linearity", trans. Adelheid Mers, Boot Print 1:1 (2006), pp 19–21.
- Angenommen. Eine Szenenfolge, Göttingen: Immatrix Publications, 1989; Göttingen: European Photography, 2000. (in German)
- with Jean Baudrillard and Hannes Böhringer, Philosophien der neuen Technologien, Berlin: Merve, 135 pp, 1989. (in German)
- Gesten. Versuch einer Phänomenologie, Bensheim and Düsseldorf: Bollmann, 1991, 1993 (in German)
  - Gestures, University of Minnesota Press, trans. Nancy Ann Roth, 2014, 224 pp.
- Bodenlos: Eine philosophische Autobiographie, Bensheim and Düsseldorf: Bollmann, 1992, 295 pp; Frankfurt am Main: Fischer, 1999. (in German)
  - Bezedno: filosofická autobiografie, Prague: Hynek, 1998, 225 pp. (in Czech)
  - Bodenlos: Uma autobiografia filosofica, São Paulo: Annablume, 2010. (in Portuguese)
  - Groundless, Metaflux, 2017. (in English)
- A Dúvida, Rio de Janeiro: Relume Dumará, 1999; São Paulo: Anna Blume, 2011 (In Portuguese)
  - On Doubt, Trans. Rodrigo Maltez Novaes, Minneapolis: Univocal, 2014 Foreword by Rainer Guldin 100pp. (in English)
- O Último Juízo: Gerações Vols. 1 & 2, São Paulo: É Realizações, 2017 (in Portuguese)

=== Book chapters, papers, articles (selection) ===
- "Filosofia da linguagem", Ita-Humanidades 2 (1966), pp 133–210. (in Portuguese)
- "Auf der Suche nach Bedeutung", trans. Edith Flusser with Vera Schwamborn, Tendenzen der aktuellen Philosophie in Brasilien in Selbstbildnissen 27 (1975), São Paulo: Loyola. (in German). Autobiographical essay, written in English and Portuguese in October–November 1969 in São Paulo. See also Bodenlos, 1999.
  - "Em busca do significado", in Stanislaus Ladusãns, Rumos da filosofia atual no Brasil em auto-retratos, São Paulo: Loyola, 1976, pp 493–506. (in Portuguese)
  - "In Search of Meaning (Philosophical Self-portrait)", in Writings, 2002, pp 197–208.
- "The Photograph as Post-Industrial Object: An Essay on the Ontological Standing of Photographs", Leonardo 19:4 (1986), pp 329–332.
- "Fernsehbild und politische Sphäre im Lichte der rumänischen Revolution", trans. Almuth Carstens, in Von der Bürokratie zur Telekratie. Rumänien im Fernsehen, ed. Peter Weibel, Berlin: Merve Verlag, 1990, pp 103–114. (in German)
- "On Memory (Electronic or Otherwise)", Leonardo 23:4 (1990), pp 397–399. Adapted from a presentation at Ars Electronica, September 14, 1988.
- "Die Stadt als Wellental in der Bilderflut", in Nachgeschichten, 1990. Written in 1988. Repr. in Arch+ 111 (March 1992), pp 58–63 ; Die Revolutionen der Bilder, 1995; Medienkultur, 1997, pp 178–179.
  - "The City as Wave‐Trough in the Image‐Flood", trans. Phil Gochenour, Critical Inquiry 31:2 (Winter 2005), pp 320–328.
- "Projektion statt Linearität", in Strategien des Scheins. Kunst Computer Medien, eds. Florian Rötzer and Peter Weibel, Munich, 1991, pp 93–95. (in German)
- "Räume", in außen räume innen räume. Der Wandel des Raumbegriffs im Zeitalter der elektronischen Medien, ed. Heidemarie Seblatnig, Vienna: Universitäts Verlag, 1991, pp 75–83; repr. in Raumtheorie. Grundlagentexte aus Philosophie und Kulturwissenschaften, eds. Jörg Dünne and Stephan Günzel, Frankfurt am Main: Suhrkamp, 2006, pp 274–285. (in German)
- "L'image-calcul. Pour une nouvelle imagination", in Penser l'image II. Anthropologies du visuel, ed. Emmanuel Alloa, Dijon: Les presses du réel, 2015, pp 43–56 (in French)
- Communicology : mutations in human relations? / Vilém Flusser; edited by Rodrigo Maltez Novaes; with a foreword by N. Katherine Hayles. Stanford University Press 2023
