= Andreas Müller-Pohle =

German photographer, media artist and publisher

- Born: July 19, 1951 (age 75); Braunschweig
- Education: University of Göttingen, University of Hanover
- Known for: Photographer, visiting professor, critic, artist, publisher and editor
- Notable work: Hong Kong Waters (2009–2010), Face Codes (1998–1999), Digital Scores (After Nicéphore Niépce) (1995–1998), Transformance (1979–1982), Constellations(1976–1979)
- Style: conceptual art
- Movement: Experimental photography, contemporary photography
- Awards: Prix européen de la photographie de la Fondation Reind M. De Vries, Prix Pictet, Photobook Award
- Website: muellerpohle.net

Andreas Müller-Pohle (born July 19, 1951, in Braunschweig) is a German media artist, theorist and publisher. He is considered an important representative of experimental photography and is the originator of the theory of "Visualism".

As a publisher, especially of the bi-lingual art magazine European Photography, Müller-Pohle has documented and influenced the development of independent photography since the early 1980s. Since 1983 he has published the writings of the media and culture philosopher Vilém Flusser, whose work he has popularised especially in the German speaking countries.

== Biography ==
Andreas Müller-Pohle attended primary schools in Hanover and Kassel during 1958–1962, then 1962–1970, obtained the leaving certificate at Kassel Gymnasium. He studied law at University of Göttingen from 1970 to 1971, after which he trained as a commercial employee at Continental Gummi-Werke AG, Hanover until 1973. He studied economics and communication science from 1973 to 1974 in Hanover and from 1974 to 1979 in Göttingen. During this time he was introduced to photography by a friend, and purchased equipment, teaching himself the medium. He initially worked with the moving image, and from the mid-1970s onwards engaged in practical and theoretical approaches to photography, undertaking a project Konstellationen to deal with pictorial syntax.

== Writer and theoretician ==
Müller-Pohle joined the journal Fotografie as writer and critic from 1971 to 1979, when he took over the Swiss Print Letter in 1980, including it in European Photography, and has been its publisher ever since. Friend and philosopher Vilém Flusser's first book in English, his own translation, was Towards a Philosophy of Photography published in 1984 by the then new journal European Photography, followed by other media and cultural-philosophical texts in the following years. Since then, Müller-Pohle has been working with Flusser's oeuvre and archive. In 1987, together with Volker Rapsch under their imprint Immantrix they published Flusser's essay "Die Schrift" as an early electronic book on diskette. In 1996 he produced the "Edition Flusser", a ten-volume edition.

== Educator ==
Since 1997, he has been guest professor at the Higher Institute for fine Arts, Antwerp, and since, at teaching institutes in Europe, Asia and North and South America. In 2005, he founded Eye-Mind, an individual workshop initiative in Berlin.

== Photographic practice ==
Andreas Müller-Pohle's work spans a variety of topics and concepts in pursuit of a reflective examination of the medium of photography. His first projects from the mid-1970s dealt with questions of image aesthetics and photographic perception, he then turned to - now also with the medium of video - photo recycling and the materiality and immateriality of photography. His first solo exhibition was in 1978. Müller-Pohle's interest in "interfaces" leads him in several of his works to completely renounce the classic photographic image and to transform it into other code systems (such as alphanumeric or genetic codes). In the mid-1990s, Müller-Pohle deconstructed digital, genetic and political codes. One of the first artists to have broken down and translated the analog and the digital codes of images, his series Digital Scores (after Nicéphore Niépce) decodes the photograph by Niépce, View from the Window at Le Gras into alphanumeric symbols distributed over eight panels. As Geoffrey Batchen expressed it:

Fictional nostalgia aside, today's photographic universe is found not in clumps of silver but in the algorithms racing across the surface of German artist Andreas Müller-Pohle's 1995 Digital Scores (after Nicéphore Niépce)...No dots, No silver. No emulsion. No hidden information. In fact, nothing but information

His work The Danube River Project, created in 2005 and 2006, takes up this longstanding preoccupation with interfaces: A "picture atlas" of the Danube is annotated from water samples taken by the artist and inscribed in the photographs.

Müller-Pohle's subsequent project, Hong Kong Waters, takes as subject diverse water landscapes of the Asian metropolis in a photo, video and sound installation. Another work on the topic of water, Kaunas upon the Rivers, was created in 2017 as part of an artist-in-residence.

Since 2013 Müller-Pohle has undertaken an extensive cycle revealing flows of urban traffic (Studies on Traffic), for which he uses the media of photography, sound and video.

== Exhibitions, screenings, installations ==
Müller-Pohle has shown in more than 200 exhibitions, many with published catalogues, and his work has received international attention since the mid-1980s.

- 2018 – Analog und Schwarzweiß: Fotografie in Westdeutschland 1945–2000 aus der Sammlung Schupmann. Kunsthalle Erfurt, Germany
- 2015 – Without Ground – Vilém Flusser and the Arts.ZKM | Center for Art and Media, Karlsruhe, Germany
- 2014 – Andreas Müller-Pohle: Coincidences. A Select Retrospective. Prague City Gallery, House of Photography, Prague, Czech Republic
- 2014 – (Mis)Understanding Photography. Werke und Manifeste. Museum Folkwang, Essen, Germany
- 2011 – Andreas Müller-Pohle: Hong Kong Waters. Photo/Video/Sound. Hong Kong Arts Centre, Hong Kong
- 2008 – Andreas Müller-Pohle: The Danube River Project. European Month of Photography, Uferhallen, Berlin, Germany
- 2007 – Andreas Müller-Pohle: Photo/Video/Sound. Arbeiten 1995–2006. Städtische Galerie, Palais Stutterheim, Erlangen, Germany
- 2006 – Andreas Müller-Pohle: The Danube River Project. Donauschwäbisches Zentralmuseum, Ulm, Germany
- 2004 – p0es1s. Digital Poetry. Kulturforum Potsdamer Platz, Berlin, Germany
- 2003 – Andreas Müller-Pohle: CodeZone. Digitale Arbeiten 1995–2003. Museum für Photographie, Braunschweig, Germany
- 2002 – Andreas Müller-Pohle: CodeZone. Digital Projects. Gallery Ississ, Kyoto, Japan
- 2002 – Andreas Müller-Pohle: Interfaces. FotoFest, Topek Building, Houston, Texas
- 2001 – ex machina. Über die Zersetzung der Fotografie. Neue Gesellschaft für Bildende Kunst / Künstlerhaus Bethanien, Berlin, Germany
- 2000 – Andreas Müller-Pohle: Digital Scores, Entropia. The Museum of Contemporary Photography, Chicago, Illinois
- 2000 – Andreas Müller-Pohle: Entropia. Tschumipavillon, Groningen, Netherlands
- 1999 – Das XX. Jahrhundert. Ein Jahrhundert Kunst in Deutschland. Berlin, Germany
- 1999 – Andreas Müller-Pohle: Interfaces. Foto + Video 1977–1999. Altes Rathaus, Göttingen, Germany
- 1998 – Andreas Müller-Pohle: Codex. Mücsarnok / Kunsthalle, Budapest, Hungary
- 1997 – Andreas Müller-Pohle: Entropia. Kunstverein, Rüsselsheim, Germany
- 1996 – Andreas Müller-Pohle: Entropia. World Wide Video Festival, Gemeentemuseum, The Hague, Netherlands
- 1995 – Photography After Photography. Memory and Representation in the Digital Age. Aktionsforum Praterinsel, Munich, Germany
- 1995 – Andreas Müller-Pohle: De Perrudja à Perlasca Espace Photographique Contretype, Brussels, Belgium
- 1994 – "Deutsche Kunst mit Photographie: Die 90er Jahre". Rheinisches Landesmuseum, Bonn, Germany
- 1992 – Andreas Müller-Pohle: Signa. Fotogalerie Wien, Vienna, Austria
- 1991 – Andreas Müller-Pohle: Was ich nicht sehe, fotografiere ich. Was ich nicht fotografiere, sehe ich. Arbeiten 1976–1991. Brandenburgische Kunstsammlungen, Cottbus, Germany
- 1989 – Das Foto als autonomes Bild – Experimentelle Gestaltung 1839–1989. Kunsthalle Bielefeld, Germany
- 1989 – Dokument und Erfindung – Fotografien aus der Bundesrepublik Deutschland 1945 bis heute. Haus am Lützowplatz, Berlin, Germany
- 1988 – Fotovision – Projekt Fotografie nach 150 Jahren. Sprengel Museum, Hanover, Germany
- 1986 – Fotografie: Abbildung? Einbildung? Museum am Ostwall, Dortmund, Germany
- 1984 – La Photographie créative. Bibliothèque Nationale / Pavillon des Arts, Paris, France
- 1981 – Erweiterte Fotografie. 5. Internationale Biennale, Wiener Secession, Vienna, Austria
- 1981 – New German Photography. The Photographers' Gallery, London, England
- 1980 – Vorstellungen und Wirklichkeit – 7 Aspekte subjektiver Fotografie. Museum Schloss Morsbroich, Leverkusen, Germany

== Collections ==
Müller-Pohle is represented in public and private collections.

- Bibliothèque nationale de France, Paris
- Museum für Kunst und Gewerbe Hamburg
- Polaroid Collection, Amsterdam
- Musée Cantini, Marseille
- Museum of Contemporary Photography, Columbia College Chicago
- Sammlung fotografis Länderbank, Vienna
- Center for Creative Photography, University of Arizona
- Hong Kong Heritage Museum, Hong Kong
- Museum of Fine Arts, Houston
- San Francisco Museum of Modern Art
- Institut Valencià d'Art Modern, Spain

== Awards ==
- 2021 – Hong Kong Photobook Award – elected judge
- 2011 – Prix Pictet - elected nominator
- 2008 – Kassel PhotoBook Award
- 2001 – Prix européen de la photographie de la Fondation Reind M. De Vries

== Bibliography ==
- Andreas Muellerpohle : photo/video/sound 1995 - 2006, Städtische Galerie Erlangen 2007, ISBN 9783923899340
- Coleman, A.D. Andreas Müller-Pohle : Synopsis. Québec, Qc: Vu, 1997
- Equivalence. Andreas Müller-Pohle, [online], 2017
- Godefroid, Jean-Louis. Cyclogrammes : Andreas Müller-Pohle, exhibition catalogue, Galerie Mantoux-Gignac from 16 January to 8 March 1997, Bruxelles: Espace photographique contretype, 1996
- LensCulture: Andreas Müller-Pohle, [online], 2017
- Tomaszek, Patricia. Andreas Müller-Pohle, [online], 2013
