= Moritz Neumüller =

Curator, educator, and writer in photography and new media

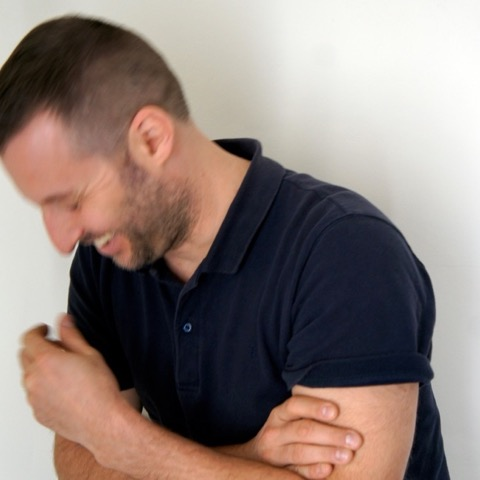
Moritz Neumüller in 2016

Moritz Neumüller (born 1972) is a curator, educator and writer in the field of photography and new media.

== Life and work ==
Neumüller was born in Linz, Austria. He holds a master's degree in Art History and a PhD degree in Information Management and has worked for several international art institutions, such as the Museum of Modern Art in New York, PHotoEspaña in Madrid and LOOP in Barcelona. Neumüller is Curatorial Advisor for PhotoIreland in Dublin, and was Director of the Department of Photography at the Istituto di Design (IED), in Madrid from 2010-19. He is currently Chief Curator of the PhotobookWeek Aarhus (Denmark) and founding director of ArteConTacto, a project to make art and culture accessible to all. For his work in the project ARCHES, he was nominated as a European Key Innovator. He also co-founded the online database Museum For All, together with the Design for All Foundation and Tothomweb.

As a curator, Moritz is interested in contemporary work made by photographers and media artists from around the world, especially documentary, social and conceptual work. His publications include El otro lado del alma (2005), Bernd & Hilla Becher Speak with Moritz Neumüller (2005), All Inclusive. New Spanish Photography (2007), To Have & To Lose by Mireia Sallarès (2008), Martin Parr's Best Books of the Decade (2011) and the catalogue for the Daegu Biennale in Korea (2014).

Neumüller is a regular contributor to European Photography Magazine and on the editorial board of the encyclopaedia project The European History of Photography. He is a member of the curatorial associations Oracle and IKT, and runs an online resource for visual artists, called The Curator Ship, since 2010.

Neumüller has conducted curatorial projects on and with Bernd and Hilla Becher, Ricardo Cases, Masao Yamamoto, Edmund Clark, Cristina de Middel, Martin Parr, Stephen Gill, Chris Jordan, Dinu Li, Gabriel Orozco, Mireia Sallarès, Oliver Sieber & Katja Stuke, Alejandro Castellote, Horacio Fernández, and Rosina Cazali.

Recent projects include a Routledge Companion on Photography and Visual Culture, and the exhibition Photobook Phenomenon for the CCCB center in Barcelona.

== Publications ==
- 3D Printing for Cultural Heritage: Preservation, Accessibility, Research and Education (with A. Reichinger, F. Rist y Ch. Kern), 3D Research Challenges in Cultural Heritage, Springer Berlin Heidelberg, 2014, pp. 119–134.
- Thomas Seelig, Urs Stahel (eds.). The Ecstasy of Things, Fotomus. Winterthur & Steidl, 2004
- El Otro Lado Del Alma. Syncretisms in Contemporary Cuban Photography. Zurich: Edition Oehrli, 2005
- Bernd & Hilla Becher hablan con Moritz Neumüller. Conversaciones con Fotógrafos = Bernd & Hilla Becher Speak with Moritz Neumüller. Conversations with Photographers. Madrid: La Fábrica Ediciones / Fundación Telefónica, 2005
- Import/Export. Un diálogo fotográfico, Centro Cultural de España, Guatemala, 2006
- Chris Jordan. In Katrina’s Wake, in: Naturaleza, Catálogo de PHotoEspaña 2006, La Fábrica Ediciones, Madrid, 2006, pp 134–137.
- All Inclusive. New Spanish Photography, Lodz Photography Festival, Poland, 2007
- Metropolis. With Joan Villaplana y Jacobo Zabalo, Editorial Laboral, Barcelona, 2008
- Festivalzeit – Medienzeit, in: Monat der Fotografie, Festival Catalogue Wien, 2008, 10-14
- To Have & To Lose. Three projects by Mireia Sallarès, Galleri Image, Aarhus, Dinamarca, 2008 (Reeditado como MIEC & STRACIC, Lodz, Poland, 2009)
- Raum Körper Einsatz, e-book in DAISY Format, Museum auf Abruf and ArteConTacto, Vienna 2010.
- Kleinbürger. New Photography and Video Art from Austria, in: Festival Catalogue, Pingyao, 2010, 92-93
- Collaborative Changes. PhotoIreland Catalogue, Dublín 2011
- Martin Parr's Best Books of the Decade. Dublin: PhotoIreland, 2011. Edited by Neumüller and Angel Luis Gonzalez.
- On Migration. PhotoIreland Catalogue, Dublín 2012
- Private Faces Public. Exhibition Catalogue, IED / PHotoEspaña, Madrid 2013
- New Irish Works. PhotoIreland Catalogue, Dublín 2013
- Roc Herms, YO YO YO (editor), Barcelona 2014
- Marta Mantyka, Hashtag (editor), Warsaw, 2015
- Photobook Phenomenon. Munich: Prestel; CCCB/RM/Fundació Foto Colectania, 2017. A box set of eight booklets of writing, one each by Neumüller and Lesley Martin ("Photobook Phenomenon"), Markus Schaden and Frederic Lezmi, Martin Parr, Horacio Fernández, Ryuichi Kaneko, Gerry Badger, Erik Kessels, and Irene de Mendoza and Neumüller ("Contemporary Practices"). ISBN 978-8417047054.
