= European Photography =

German academic periodical on photography

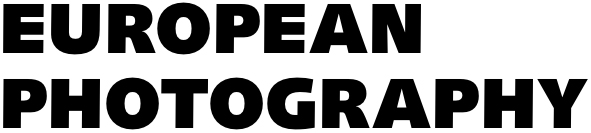
- Editor: Andreas Müller-Pohle (1980–present)
- Categories: Photography; New media art
- Frequency: 2×/year
- Format: 80 pages, 240 x 300 mm (11 4/5″ x 9 1/2″), sewn binding
- Publisher: Andreas Müller-Pohle
- Founder: Andreas Müller-Pohle
- Founded: 1980
- First issue: 1 January 1980
- Company: European Photography
- Country: Germany
- Based in: Berlin
- Language: English/German
- Website: equivalence.com
- ISSN: 0172-7028
- OCLC: 873969571

European Photography, based in Berlin, is an independent art magazine for international contemporary photography and new media. It was founded in 1980 and is published by the German artist Andreas Müller-Pohle.

== History ==
European Photography was founded as a quarterly magazine in German and English in 1980. Each issue focused on one particular theme and also reported on international photo initiatives, exhibitions, and book publications. It drew on an international network of photographers, critics, and curators. Only the first few issues were restricted to European themes; according to editor/publisher Müller-Pohle, by 1985 at the latest;

"the magazine title had changed [...] from the literal to the metaphorical: Europe meaning transnationalism, pluralism, diversity."

In addition to presenting current photographic positions, the magazine has played a decisive role in the theoretical and programmatic debate on the medium of photography and has had a lasting influence on this.^{[2]}

In 1993, European Photography changed its publication frequency from quarterly to bi-annual, with a new format (24 x 30 cm) and page count (84).

In 2004, the publishing house moved from Göttingen to Berlin.

== Ethos ==
European Photography contributed significantly to the theoretical debate about photography and new media and published programmatic texts early on, for example on Visualism, which as Paula Gortazar explains

"...was not only the title of the article but also the name of the theory it presented. Having emerged on the western side of the Iron Curtain, the theory of Visualism challenged Cold War ideologies...and, coupled with his own practice, was the result of a vindication of authenticity, a response to an overdose of imagery charged with capitalist ideology."

Visualism is a system of representation that seeks form within the visible world, rather than utilizing established codes or inventories.

Quite early, in a 1985 article by Joachim Schmid, and thereafter, the magazine confronted the implications of emerging digital photography and the developments in diversifying forms of new media art.

While initially focusing on young European photography, the journal soon turned to non-European developments as well, for example separately covering Australian and North American photography in two editions in 1985 (issues 23 and 24). In the years that followed, the magazine regularly featured photographers and artists from Asia, Latin America and the African continent, including, for example, thematic editions on contemporary photography in Japan or China (issues 61 and 76).

== Contributors ==
In addition to the photographers and their work represented, and alongside Andreas Müller-Pohle, and Vilém Flusser, important authors have included:

- Hubertus von Amelunxen
- Geoffrey Batchen
- Derek Bennett
- Ronald Berg
- Daniel Boetker-Smith
- Boris von Brauchitsch
- Victor Burgin
- Jörg M. Colberg
- A. D. Coleman
- Marc Feustel
- Joan Fontcuberta
- Alasdair Foster
- Frits Gierstberg
- Oliver Grau
- Boris Groys
- Jean-Claude Lemagny
- Moritz Neumüller
- Christoph Tannert, director, Künstlerhaus Bethanien Berlin
- Bill Kouwenhoven
- Maren Polte
- Stefanie Grebe
- Oscar Ho
- Klaus Honnef
- Hans-Michael Koetzle
- Wolf Lieser
- Marcel René Marburger
- Marc Prüst
- Markus Schaden
- Joachim Schmid
- Bisi Silva
- Wendy Watriss
- Ulf Erdmann Ziegler

The magazine draws on an international editorial network; Vladimír Birgus (Prague), A.D. Coleman (New York), Anthony Georgieff (Sofia), Gu Zheng (Shanghai) Johanna Hofleitner (Vienna), Ian Jeffrey (London), Gottfried Jäger (Bielefeld), Hans-Michael Koetzle, (Munich), Vaclav Macek (Bratislava), Chris Miller (Oxford), David Glenn Rinehart (San Francisco), Johan Swinnen (Antwerp), Christoph Tannert (Berlin)

== Allied publications ==
In addition to the periodical, European Photography has produced book-form publications.

In 1982, the European Photo Galleries Guide was released, of which seven further updated and successively expanded editions under the title European Photography Guide followed through 2003. The editors described the eighth and final edition – the collaborative effort of over forty correspondents in thirty-four countries – as "the most comprehensive reference work on the photography-and-art scene in Europe ever published."

In 1983, European Photography's first theoretical book publication was the essay Für eine Philosophie der Fotografie by the media and cultural philosopher Vilém Flusser, whom Andreas Müller-Pohle had met two years earlier at a symposium in Düsseldorf and who subsequently became a regular columnist for the magazine. An English translation was published in 1984 under the title Towards a Philosophy of Photography. Flusser's collaboration with European Photography continued on various levels until his death in 1991, most importantly as a columnist for the magazine ("Reflections") and as author of the ten-volume Edition Flusser published by Müller-Pohle.

Also in 1983, European Photography took over the magazine Print Letter, which had been founded in 1976 by Marco Misani in Zurich and was aimed at galleries, museums, and collectors. It was continued in European Photography until 1989 as a separate section of the magazine, last identified in the imprint in 1995.

== Academic resource ==
European Photography is held in a number of university libraries internationally, and is recommended reading for photography and visual culture courses. Articles in the journal are frequently cited in theses, conference proceedings, journal articles, bibliographies, and books.
