= Işıl Eğrikavuk =

Turkish artist and academic (born 1980)

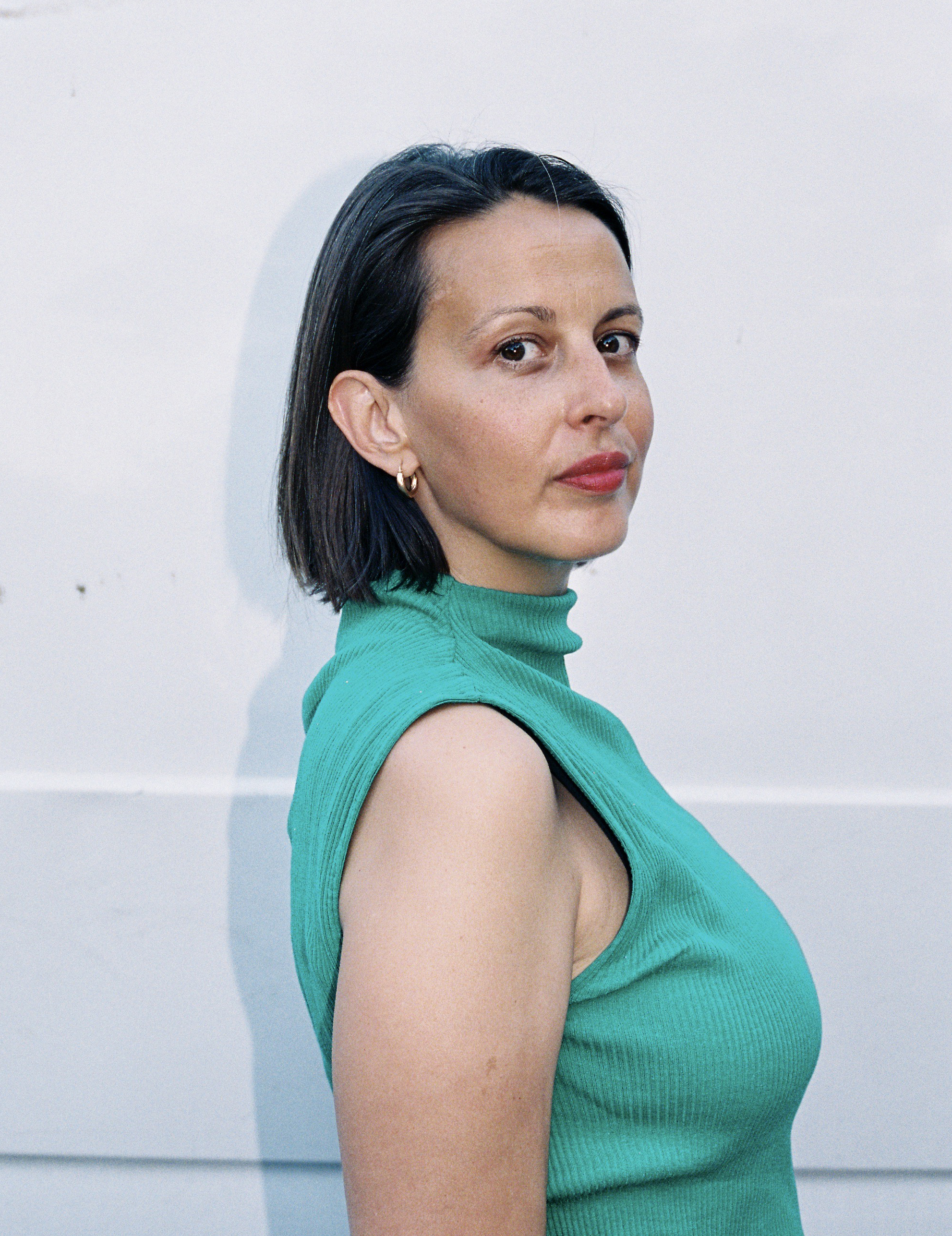
Işıl Eğrikavuk, 2022

Işıl Eğrikavuk (born November 7, 1980) is a Turkish-born international performance artist and academic, based in Berlin, Germany. Her work utilizes storytelling, journalism and dialogue-based practices and examines critical themes including protest, feminism, identity politics, nature, and universal interconnectedness. These works take the form of temporary and permanent installations, interactive events and performances, photographic and video documentation, and text-based work.

She received her MFA from The School of the Art Institute of Chicago (SAIC) and a Ph.D. in communication from Istanbul Bilgi University, Istanbul, Turkey.

== Themes ==
=== Protest and gentrification ===
In the 2012 performance Change Will Be Terrific, she collaborated with Jozef E. Amado and Turkish rapper Fuat Ergin to create the song Karar Bizim (Our Decision) which was widely played at the Gezi Park protests in 2013. The project started one year before the protests to address gentrification in the central Taksim Square area. Reverse Corner (2013) and An Unusual Neighbourhood Tour (2010) are other works which explore protest and gentrification.

=== Feminism and censorship ===
In Time to Sing a New Song (2016), Eğrikavuk utilizes humor and playful language to enact an alternative perspective to traditional patriarchal religious mythologies. This video installation at the top of the Marmara Pera Hotel was shut down in an act of censorship by Turkish officials. Other works by Eğrikavuk employ humor to challenge gender norms including Departure Time (2015) where the artists has her shoes shinned while wearing a wedding dress.

=== Political critique ===
The Art of Disagreement (2015), draws directly from contemporary Turkish political events and absurdly reproduces them to critically reflect on their dangerous nature. More recently, in Pluto's Kitchen (2016) she critiqued Brexit by likening it to the disintegration of a love affair and Pluto's break up from the planetary system when it was downgraded to a dwarf planet.

=== Interconnectedness ===
Interconnectedness is an overarching theme in Eğrikavuk's work. Her 2021 thesis, From a Political Protest to an Art Exhibition: Building Interconnectedness through Dialogue Based Art, was a collaboration with 6 art and ecology collectives from Turkey focused on developing ways to communicate with one-another in atmospheres with restricted of freedom of expression. In The Other Garden (2022), along with her students at Universität der Künste, she established a garden in the backyard of their university where they grow wild plants that are not originating in Germany and focus on issues of bio-diversity, inclusivity and care work.

== Education and journalism ==
In 2003, Eğrikavuk earned a BA in Western Languages and Literature from Boğazici University. In 2005, she earned an MA in Arts Administration, followed by an MFA in Performance (2008) from SAIC, funded in part by a Koç Foundation Scholarship. In 2021, she earned her Ph.D. from Istanbul Bilgi University, Istanbul, Turkey.

=== Journalism ===
Between 2008 and 2013, Eğrikavuk worked in Turkey as a journalist, reporter, and editor at Hürriyet Daily News, formerly Turkish Daily News. From 2013 to 2016, Eğrikavuk wrote a weekly column in Turkish, Güncel Sanat Kafası (High on Contemporary Art), published in daily national newspaper Radikal, that commented on the intersection of daily news and contemporary art in Turkey.

== Teaching and research ==
In 2008, Eğrikavuk began her teaching career at SAIC administering the course “Absurd Everyday.” In Turkey, Eğrikavuk has been an adjunct professor at Sabanci University (Visual Arts Department), Boğaziçi University (Western Languages and Literature Department), Yıldız Teknik (Art and Design department), and for ten years at Istanbul Bilgi University (Visual Communication, Photography and Video, Culture and Art Management Departments). Since 2017, Eğrikavuk has been at Universität der Künste, Berlin, Germany (UdK), Communication Department (Gesellschafts und Wirtschaftskommunikation) as a Post Ph.D. Research Associate and faculty member.

=== Ph.D. ===
Eğrikavuk received her Ph.D. in communication from Istanbul Bilgi University in 2021. Thesis title: From A Political Protest To An Art Exhibition: Building Interconnectedness Through Dialogue-Based Art.

=== Publications ===
==== Books ====
- Eğrikavuk, Işıl (2024): Global Protests Through Art - co-creation, collaboration, and interconnectedness, co-published by Books People Places and Berlin University of Arts (UdK), Berlin, Germany.
- Eğrikavuk, Işıl in collaboration with students from Art and Feminisms Class (2021): Art and Feminisms, UdK Berlin.
- Eğrikavuk, Işıl (2012): Under the Same Roof, Artist Book, Istanbul

==== Book chapters ====
- Eğrikavuk, Işıl (2024). Collaboration and Dialogue in Artistic Research. In: Doing and Being Together: Cases from Media Studies. IPCC 21, Routledge Companion, Istanbul.
- Eğrikavuk, Işıl (2023). Crisis and Activism as Performance. In: Aneta Mancewicz, Ralf Remshardt (Eds.), Contemporary European Theatre and Performance, Routledge Companion.
- Eğrikavuk, Işıl (2020). Maybe, We Will Benefit from Our Neighbour's Good Fortune: An Exhibition on Collectivity, Community, and Dialogue in Turkey. In Adrian McGarry, Itır Erhart, Hande Eslen-Ziya, Olu Jenzen, & Umut Korkut (Eds.), The Aesthetics of Global Protest: Visual Culture and Communication. pp. 81–98. Amsterdam University Press.

==== Journal articles ====
- Eğrikavuk, Işıl (2021): Circles of Emotional Connection. Maybe We Will Benefit From Our Neighbour's Good Fortune. In: CSPA Quarterly, Center for Sustainable Practice in The Arts 33, pp. 33–46.
- Eğrikavuk, Işıl (2017): Seeing the Belly Dance as a Feminist Possibility: Gaze, Gender and Public Space in İstanbul. In: Kadın/Woman 2000 Journal for Women's Studies, 18(2). pp. 69–84.

=== Selected international lectures ===
- Garden, A Living Research Space on Ecology and Inclusivity in Academia, 13th SAR International Conference on Artistic Research, Weimar, Germany, 2022
- Performing Power and Dissent, Performance Studies International (PSI), Virtual Neighborhoods (online), 2021
- Performance Art for Self-Healing Practices, Inquiring Healing Across Screen Cultures: Recuperating narratives, mediums, and creativities workshop, Berlin (online), 2021
- Diversifying Research Methodologies: Researcher as Collaborator, ICPP, Interdisciplinary Phd Communication Conference, Istanbul Bilgi University, (online), 2021
- Presenter, 12th SAR International Conference on Artistic Research, Faculty of Fine Art, Music and Design at University of Bergen (KMD, UiB), 2020
- Play, Performance, and Practice-as-Research, The World Inside Out: Humor, Noise, and Performance Conference, UNAM Universidad Nacional Autónoma de México, 2019
- Guest Lecturer, University of Gothenburg, Sweden, 2019
- Two Sides of a Coin: Artist Talk, February, 2019, The School of The Art Institute of Chicago, Distinguished Alumni Talk, 2018
- Artist Talk, Rosa Luxemborg Foundation, Berlin, Germany, 2018
- Panelist, The Performance of Protest: a panel on visual culture and aesthetics, ICA London, June 2017

== Art career ==
In 2009, Eğrikavuk participated in the 11th Istanbul Biennial with her works Infamous Library and the video installation Gül. This was her first major exhibition.

=== Recent selected exhibitions, performances and screenings ===
2024

- Ne İlyas Ne Cemşit, Perform Istanbul, March 2024.

2023

- Everything will be just like now – just a little different, Künstlerhaus Bregenz, Austria.
- Beyond Home, Kunstraum Kreuzberg.
- Another Kind, Nesin Art Village.

2022

- Beautiful Diaspora/You are Not the Lesser Part, Museum of Contemporary Photography, Chicago, USA
- Time to Sing a New Song, Solo Exhibition, Galerie Auslage, Berlin, Germany
- Vulnerable Critters, La Casa Encendida, Madrid, Spain 2022

2021

- Chicago Architecture Biennial, Chicago
- Arnis International Residency Exhibition, Arnis, Germany
- Temporal Communities, Hamburger Bahnhof, Berlin, Germany

2020

- His TV, Errant Sound, Berlin, Germany
- The Interview, screening, Bilsart Video Art Space, Istanbul (Solo exhibition), Sharjah Biennial Film Program, UAE, Istanbul Biennial Film Program, Turkey
- Der Zeit ihre Kunst, Nassauischer Kunstverein Wiesbaden, Germany

2019

- Die Enden der Freiheit, Halle 14, Leipzig, Germany
- DEAR FEAR, solo exhibition, Die Büehne, Berlin, Germany
- Art Souterrain, Montreal, Canada
- Come On, Plato Sanat, Istanbul

2018

- Block Museum, Artist Talk-Screening, Chicago, Il
- House of Wisdom, Bonnington Gallery, Nottingham, UK

2017

- Pluto's Kitchen, Block Universe Performance Art Festival, London

2015

- Art of Disagreement, solo exhibition, Salt Ulus, Ankara, Turkey
- Mother Tongue, group exhibition, 3,14, Bergen, Norway

=== Collections ===
Eğrikavuk's work is held in multiple private collections and in the permanent collection of the Museum of Contemporary Photography.

== Recognition and awards ==
- Recipient, Borderless Art Book Fund Award, 2022
- Distinguished Alumni Award, The School of The Art Institute of Chicago, 2018
- Grand prize co-winner, Best Turkish Contemporary Artist, Full Art Prize, 2012
- Grand winner, Spot Production Fund, Istanbul, 2012
