= Museum für Kunst und Gewerbe Hamburg =

Museum of fine, applied and decorative arts in Hamburg, Germany

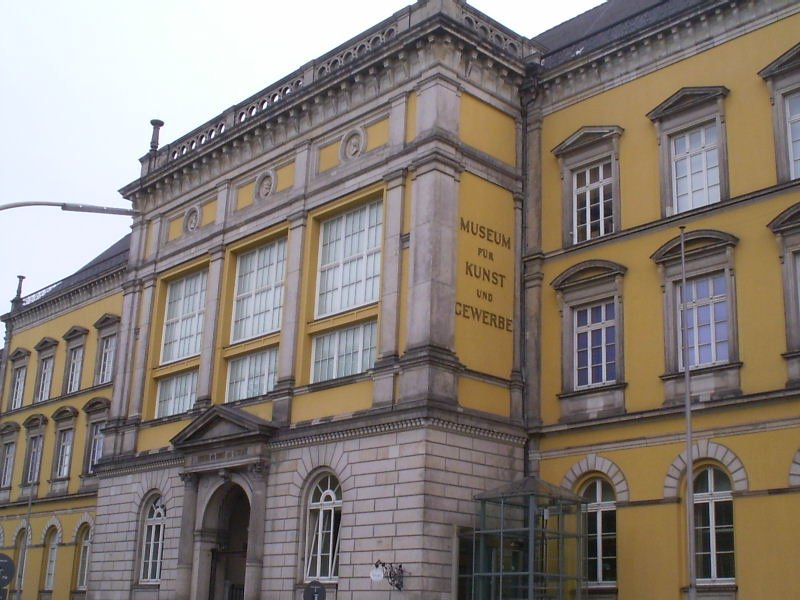

- Location of the Museum für Kunst und Gewerbe Hamburg Museum für Kunst und Gewerbe Hamburg (Germany)
- Location: Hamburg, Germany
- Coordinates: 53.551111°N 10.009444°E
- Type: Fine, applied and decorative arts
- Public transit access: Hauptbahnhof
- Website: http://www.mkg-hamburg.de/

The Museum für Kunst und Gewerbe Hamburg (Museum of Art and Design Hamburg) is a museum of fine, applied and decorative arts in Hamburg, Germany. It is located centrally, near the Hauptbahnhof.

== History ==
The museum was founded in 1874, following the models of the Victoria and Albert Museum in London, the Museum für angewandte Kunst in Vienna, and the Kunstgewerbemuseum in Berlin. In 1877 it moved to its current premises, a building on the Steintorplatz built from 1873 to 1875.

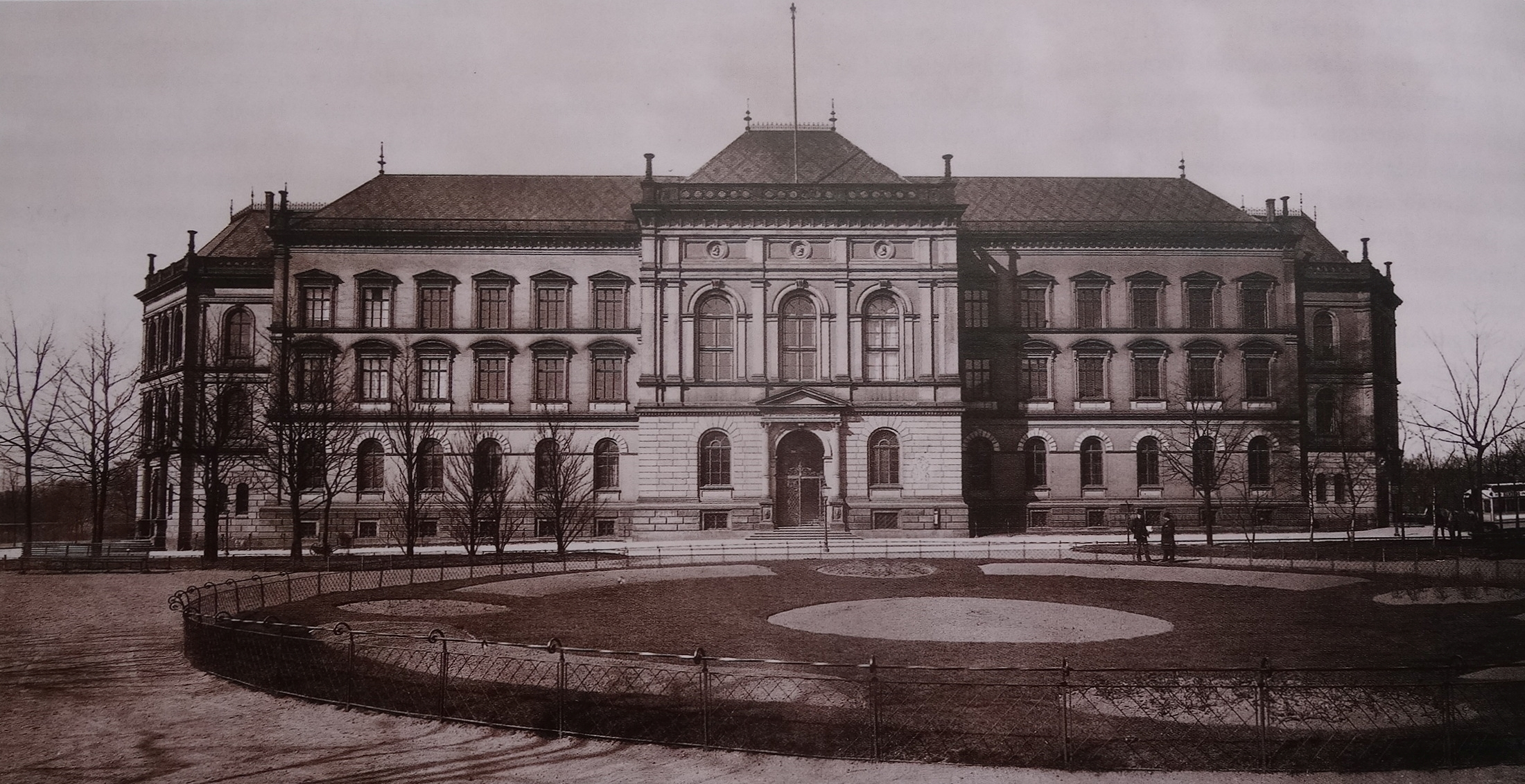

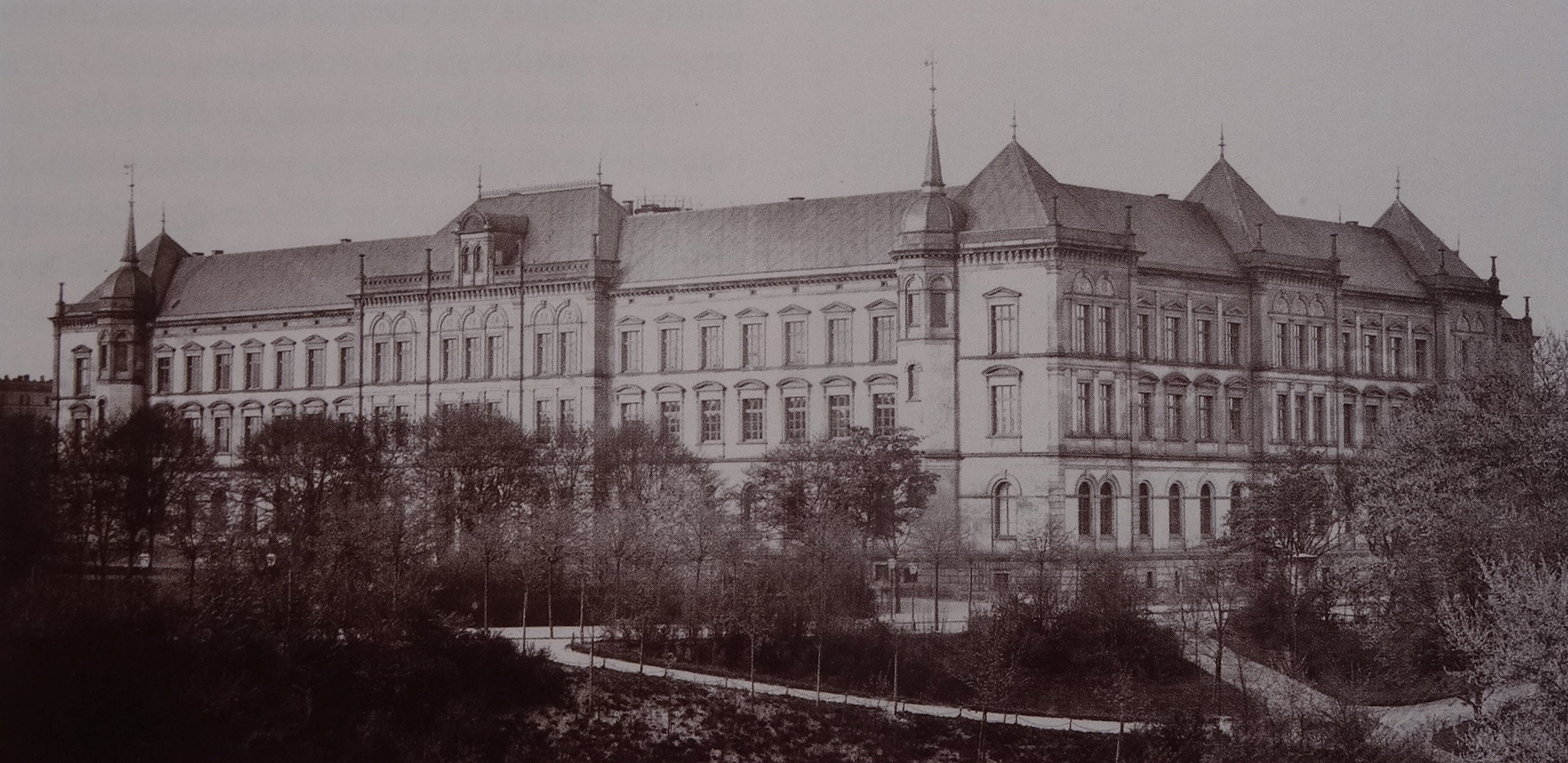

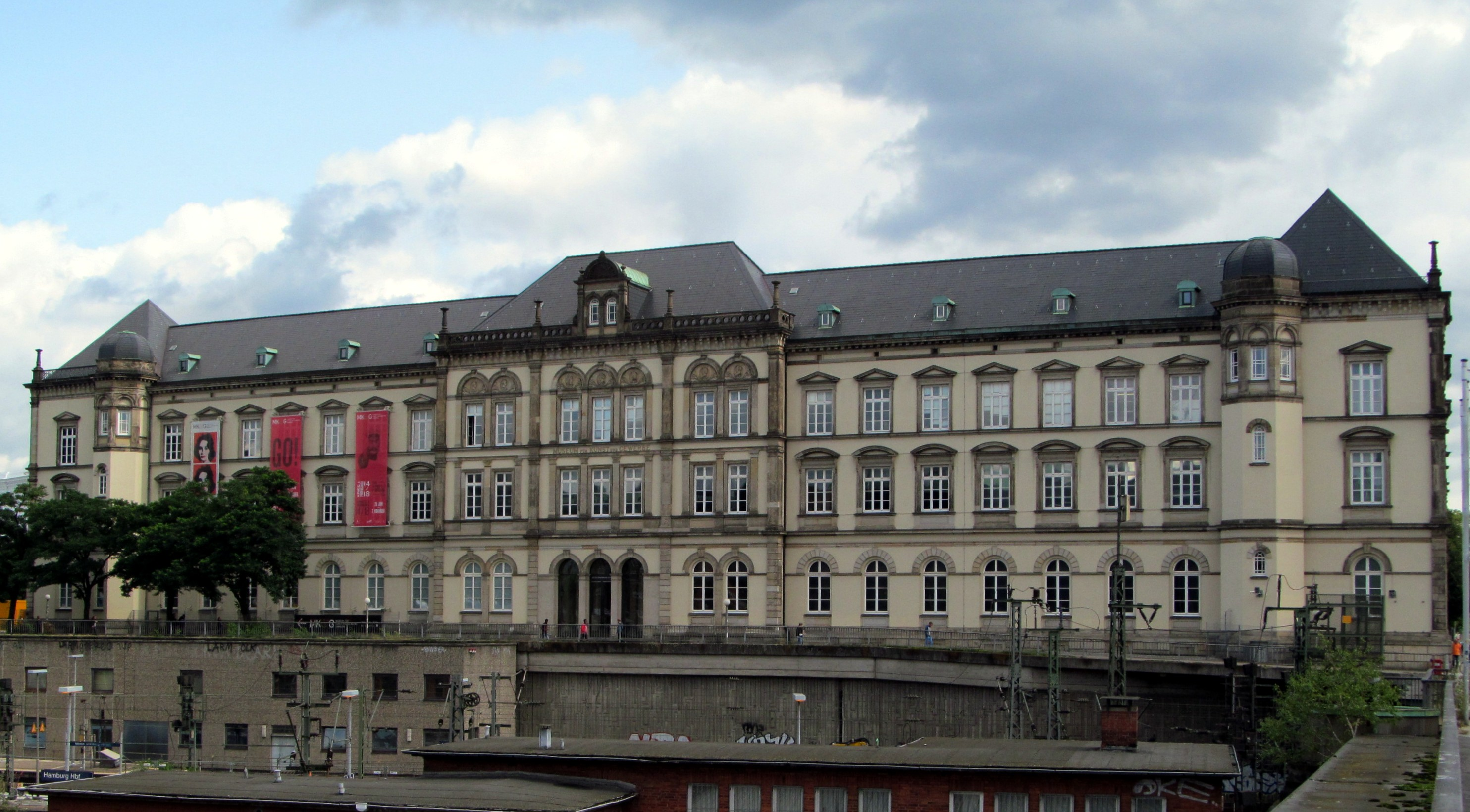

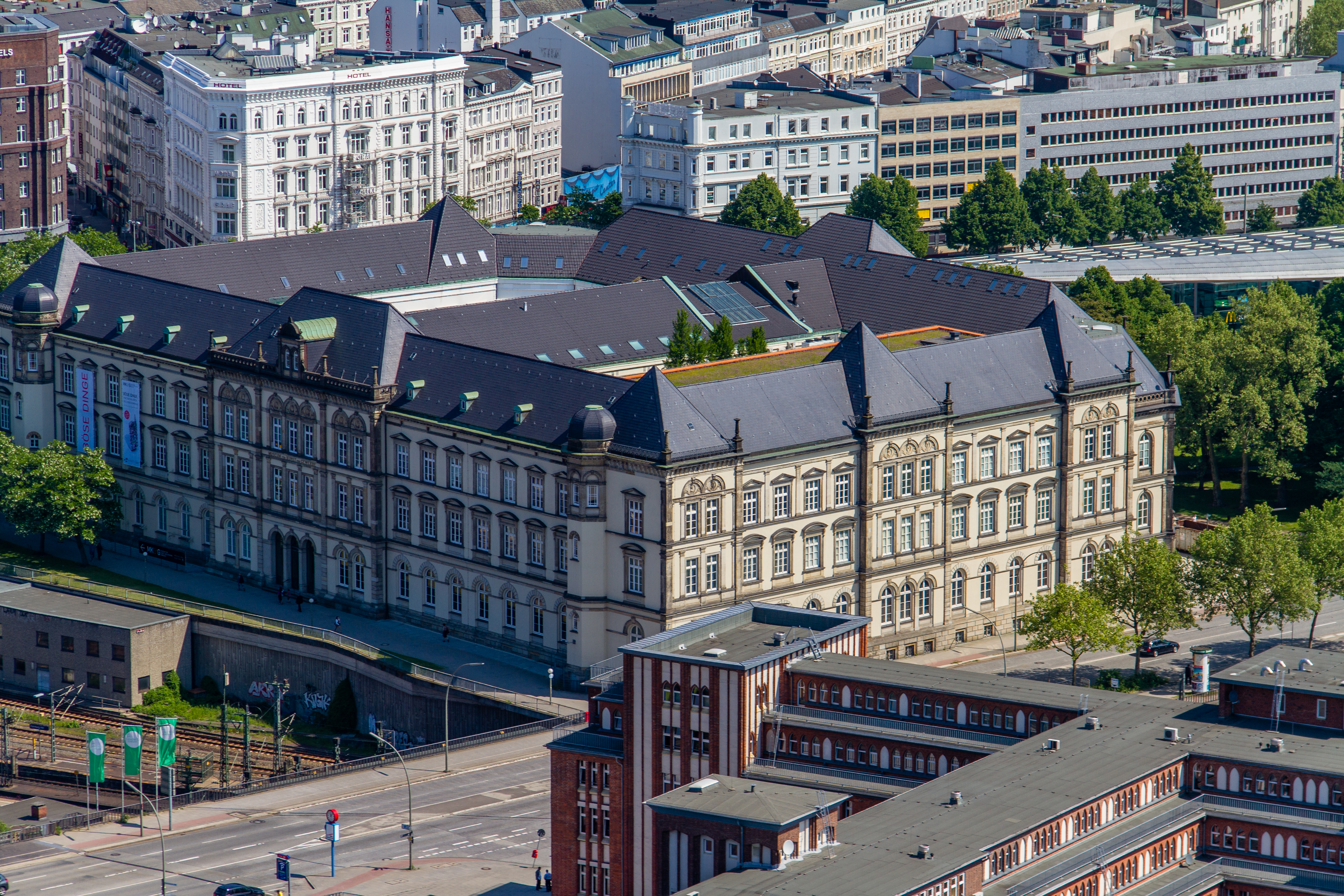
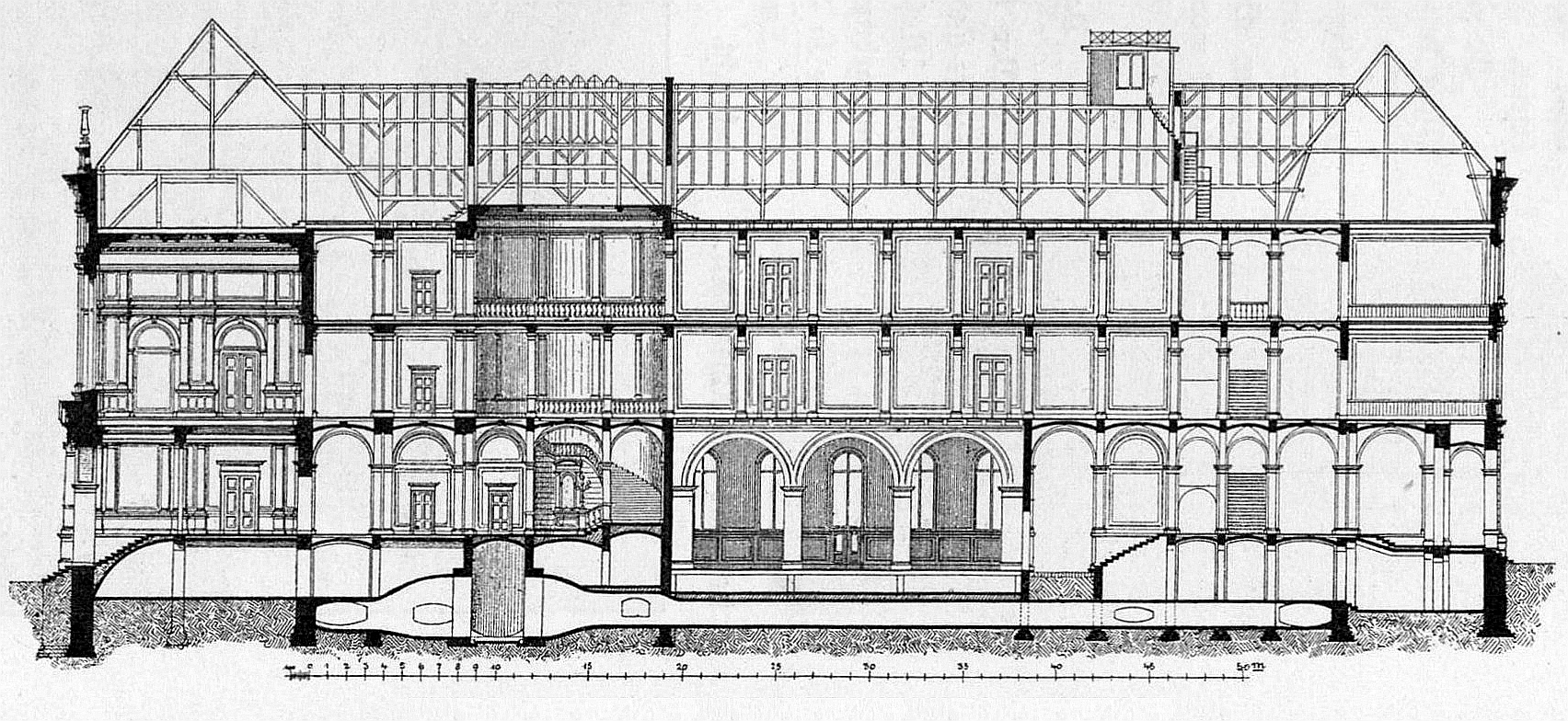
1877–1908

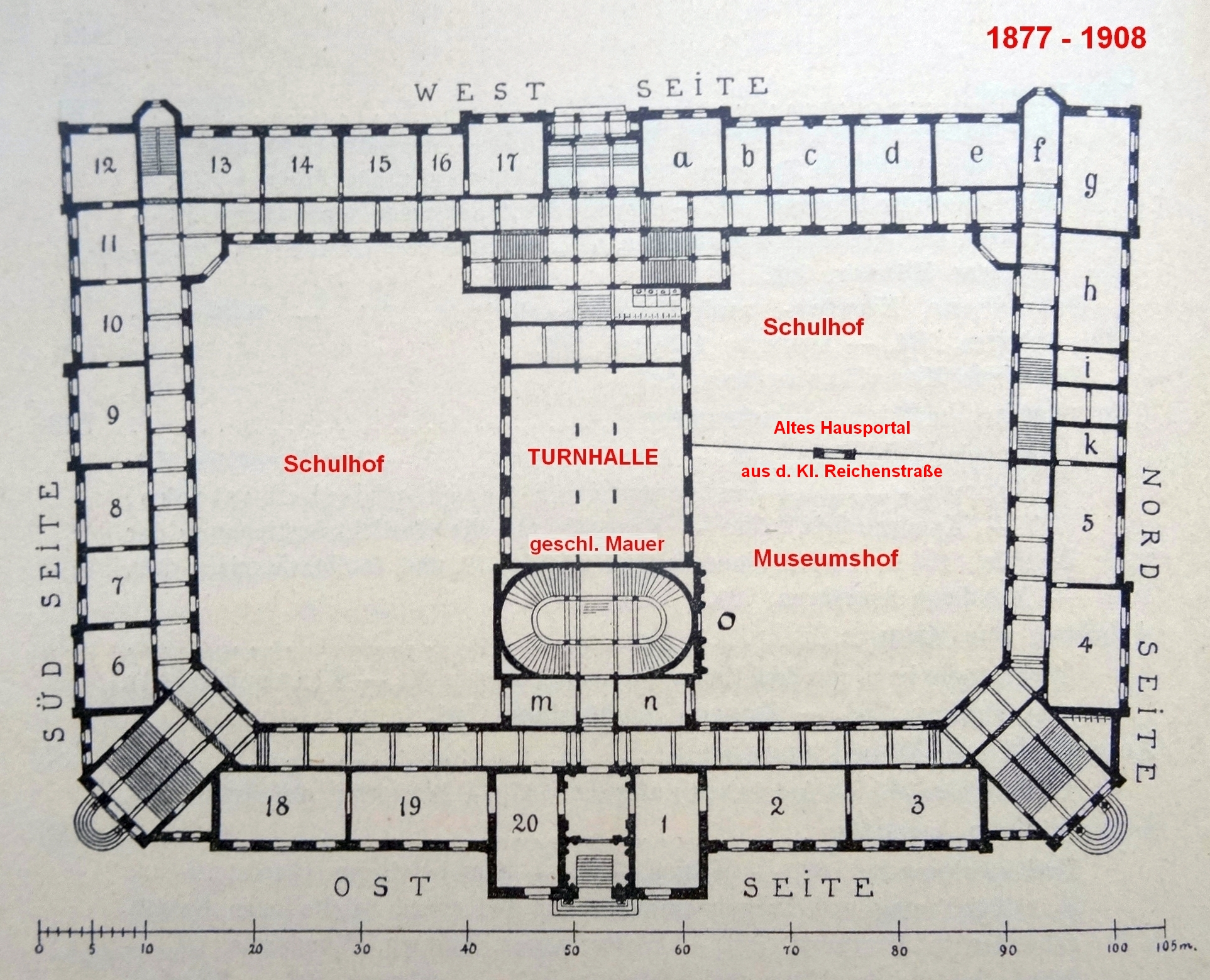
1877–1908

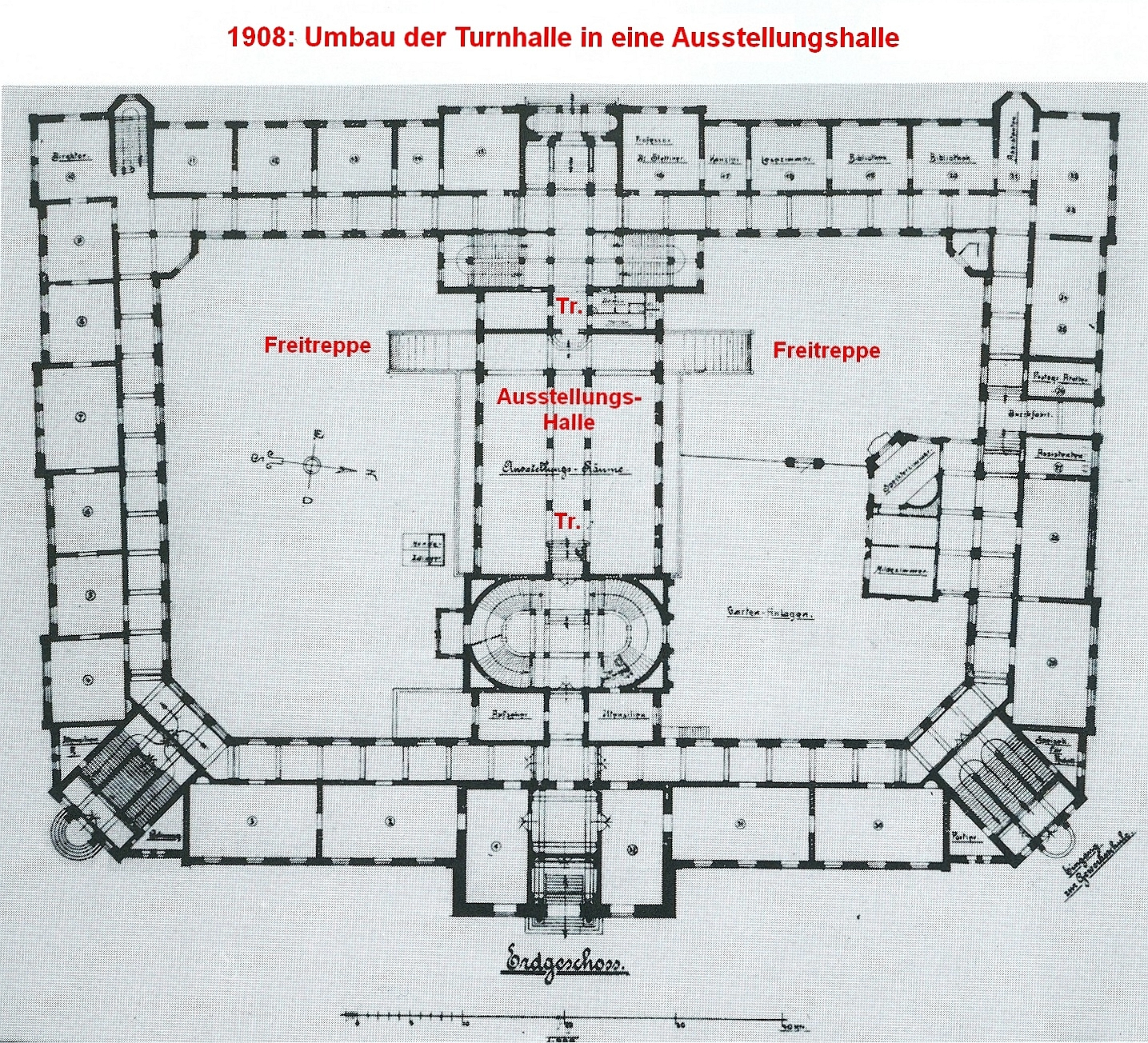
1908–1952

Between 1919 and 1933, under the direction of Max Sauerlandt, the museum acquired a large collection of Expressionist works. After 1933, the Nazi campaign against "degenerate art" resulted in the loss of numerous contemporary works, as well as the forced departure of Sauerlandt. The building was partly destroyed by bombs in 1943; the rebuilding was finished in 1959. By Harold A. Hartog redesigning the central axis was donated that could be completed in 2006.

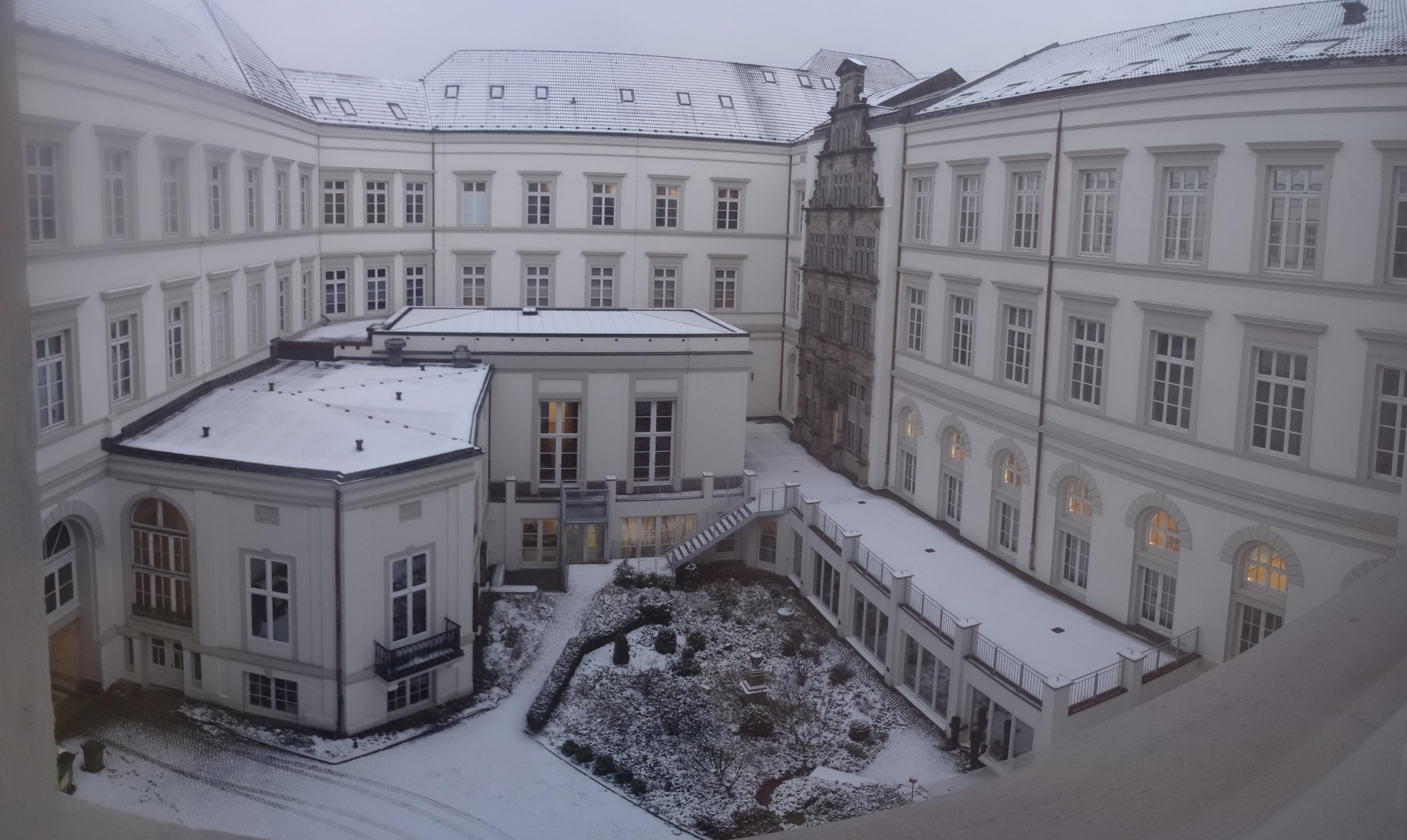

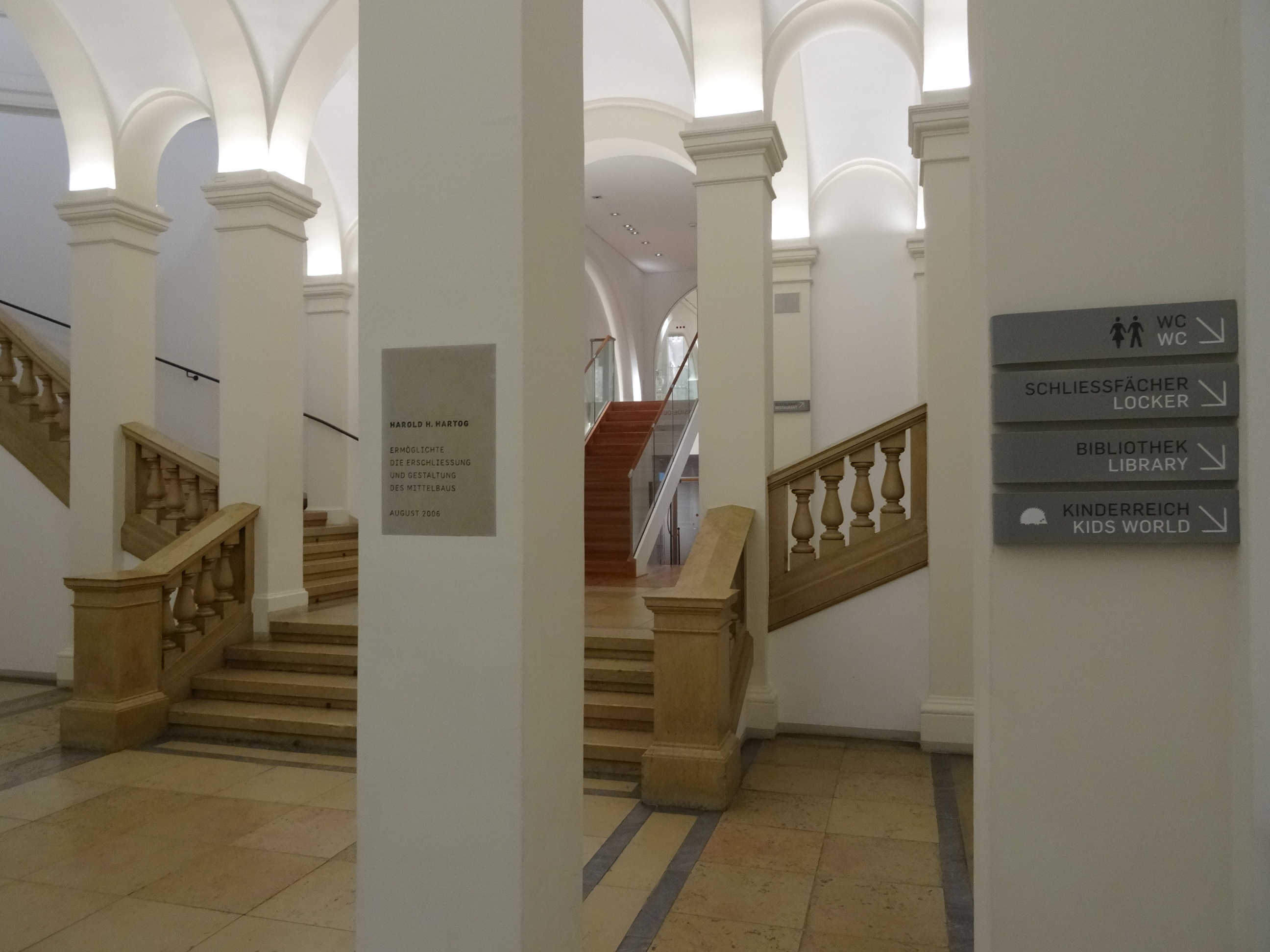

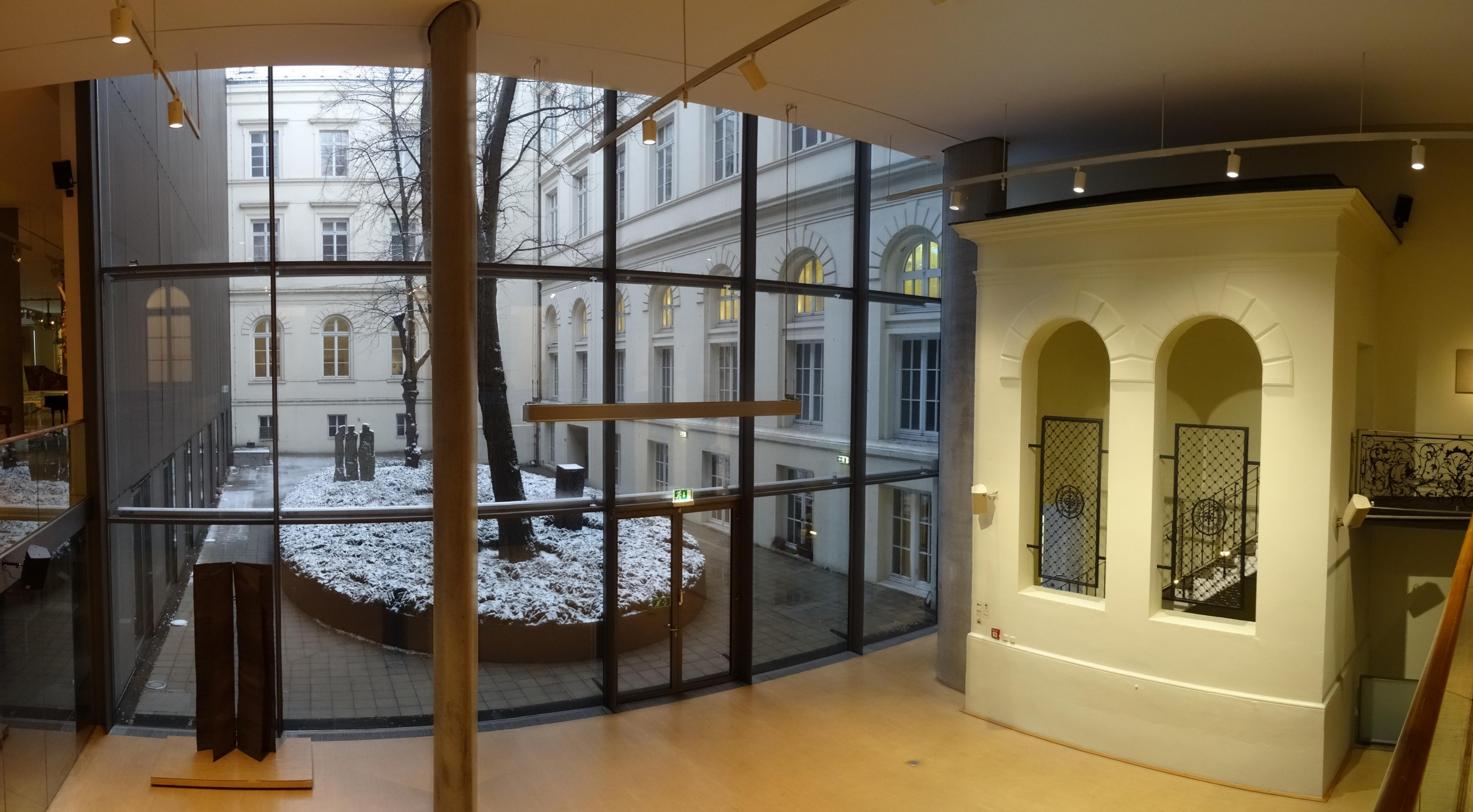

== Collections ==
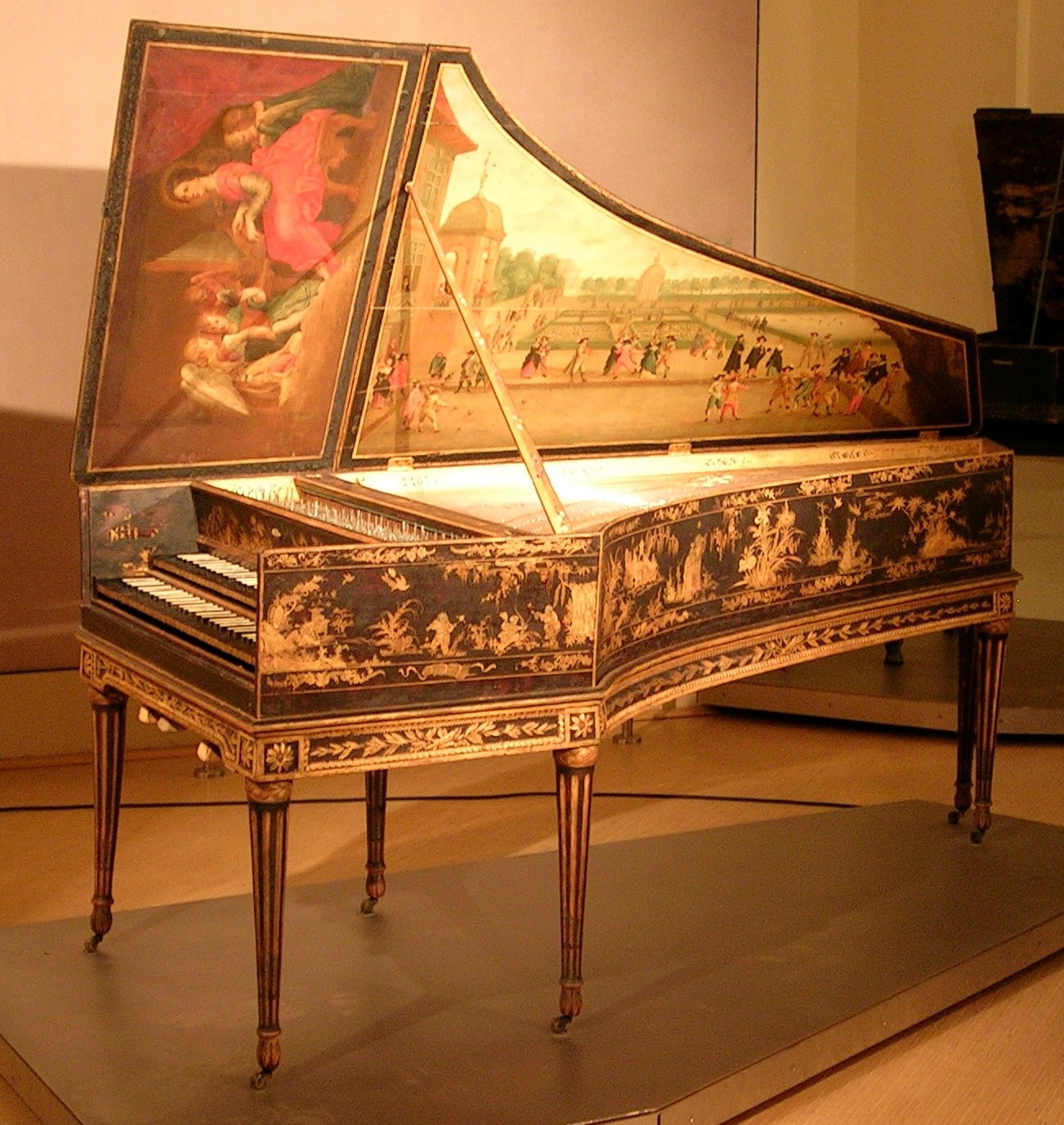
Taskin harpsichord, 1788

These include:

- Historic keyboard instruments: harpsichords, spinets, virginals, clavichords, fortepianos and square pianos.
- Faience and porcelain: most of the major 17th- and 18th-century porcelain manufacturers are represented.
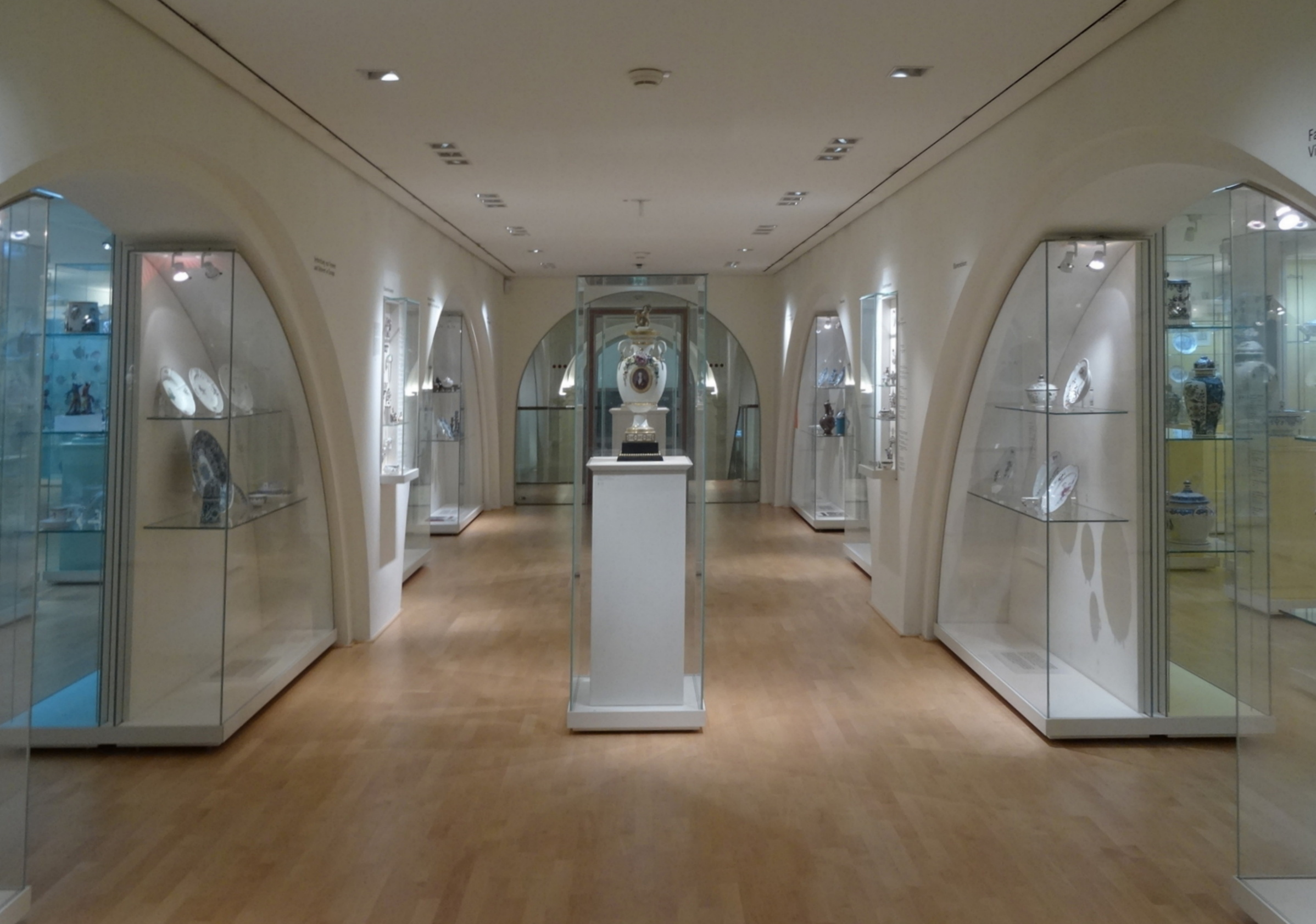

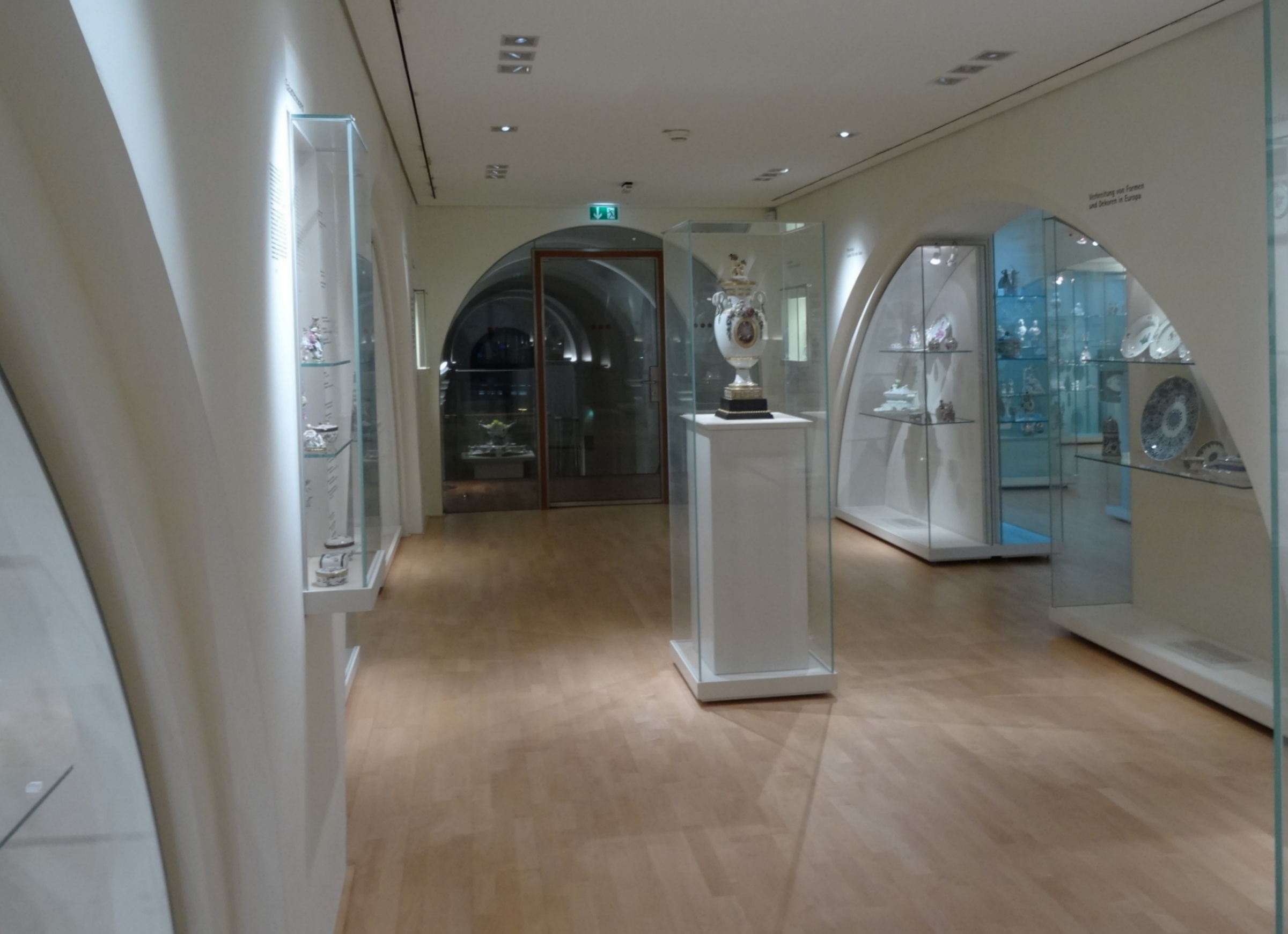

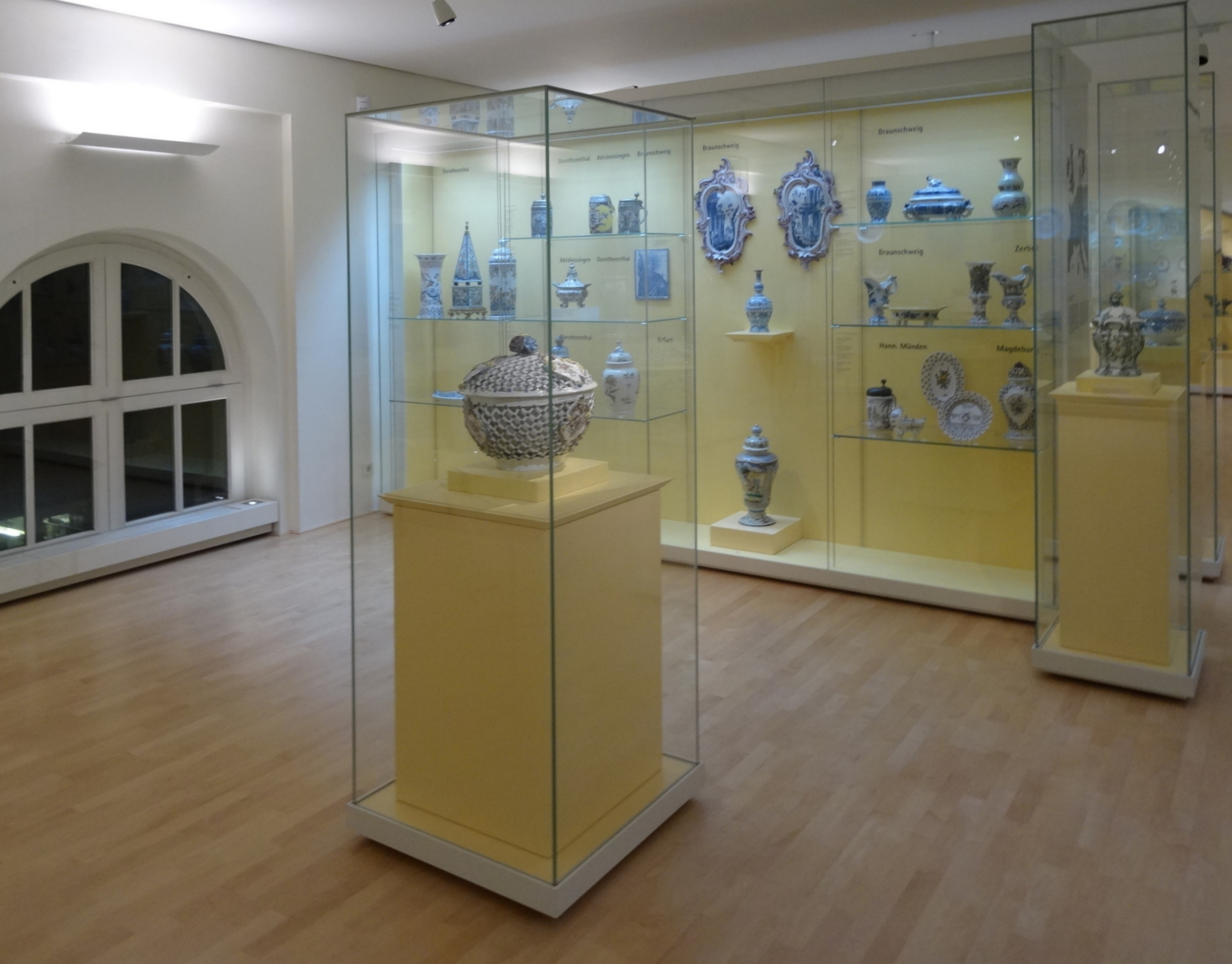

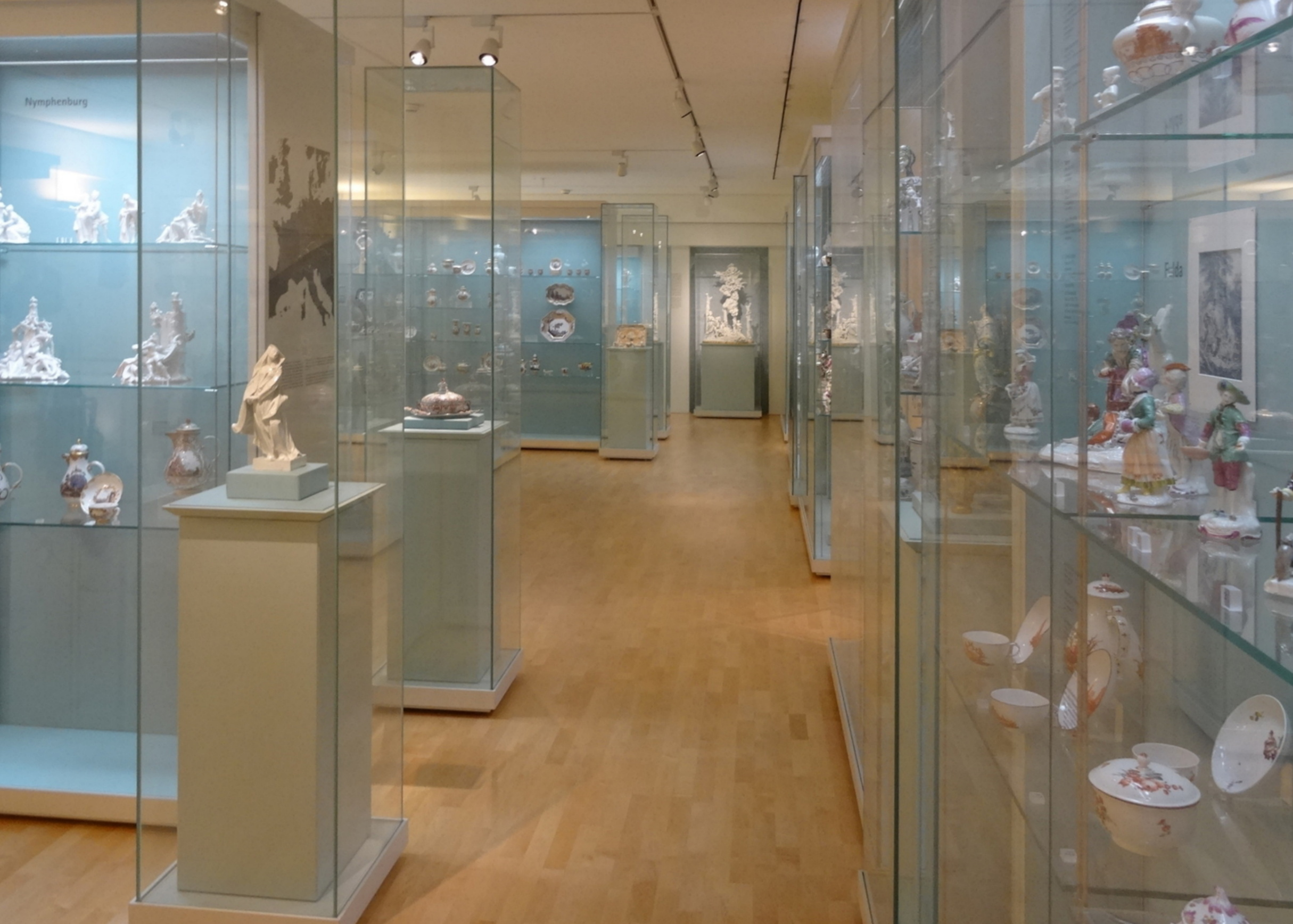

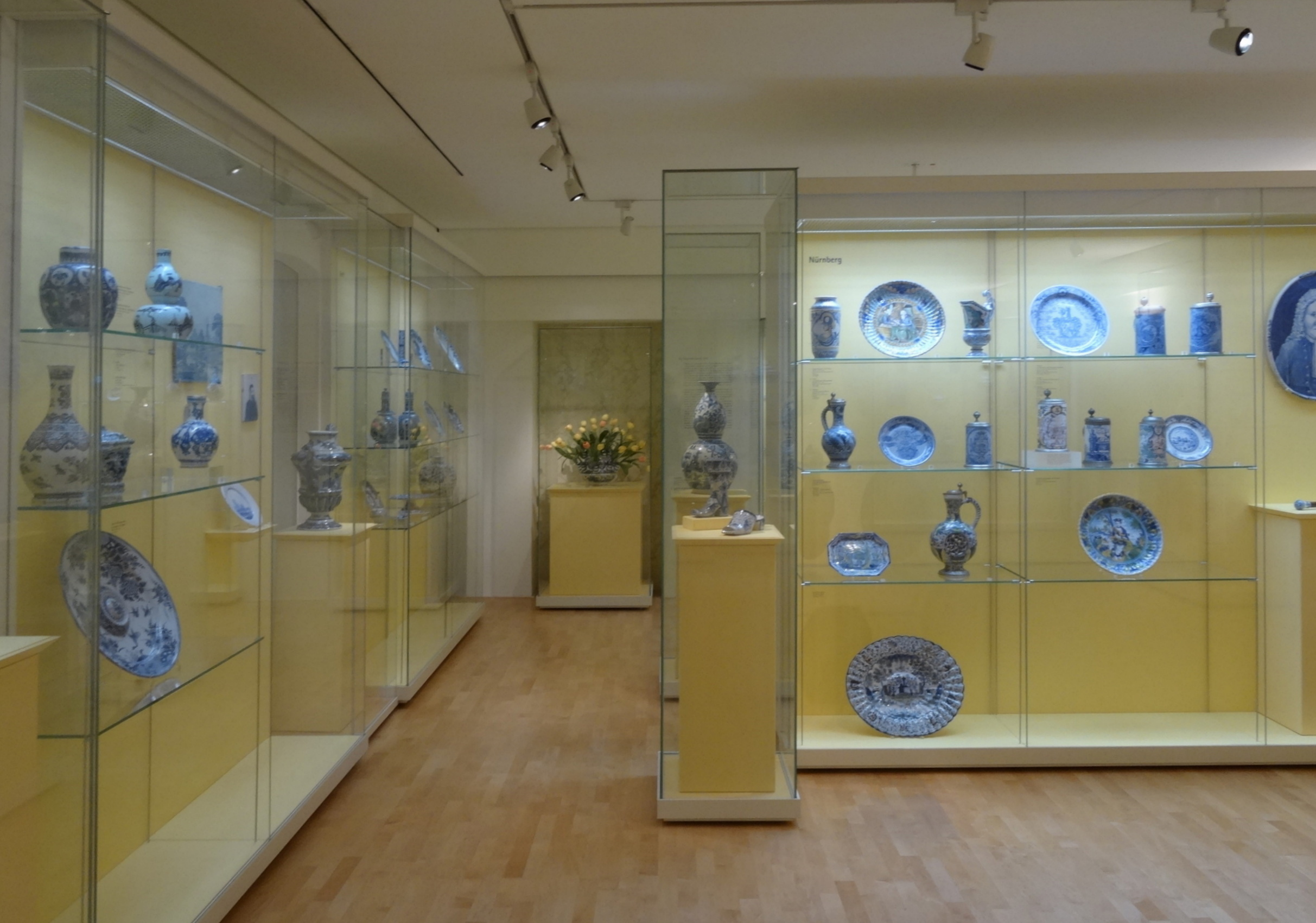

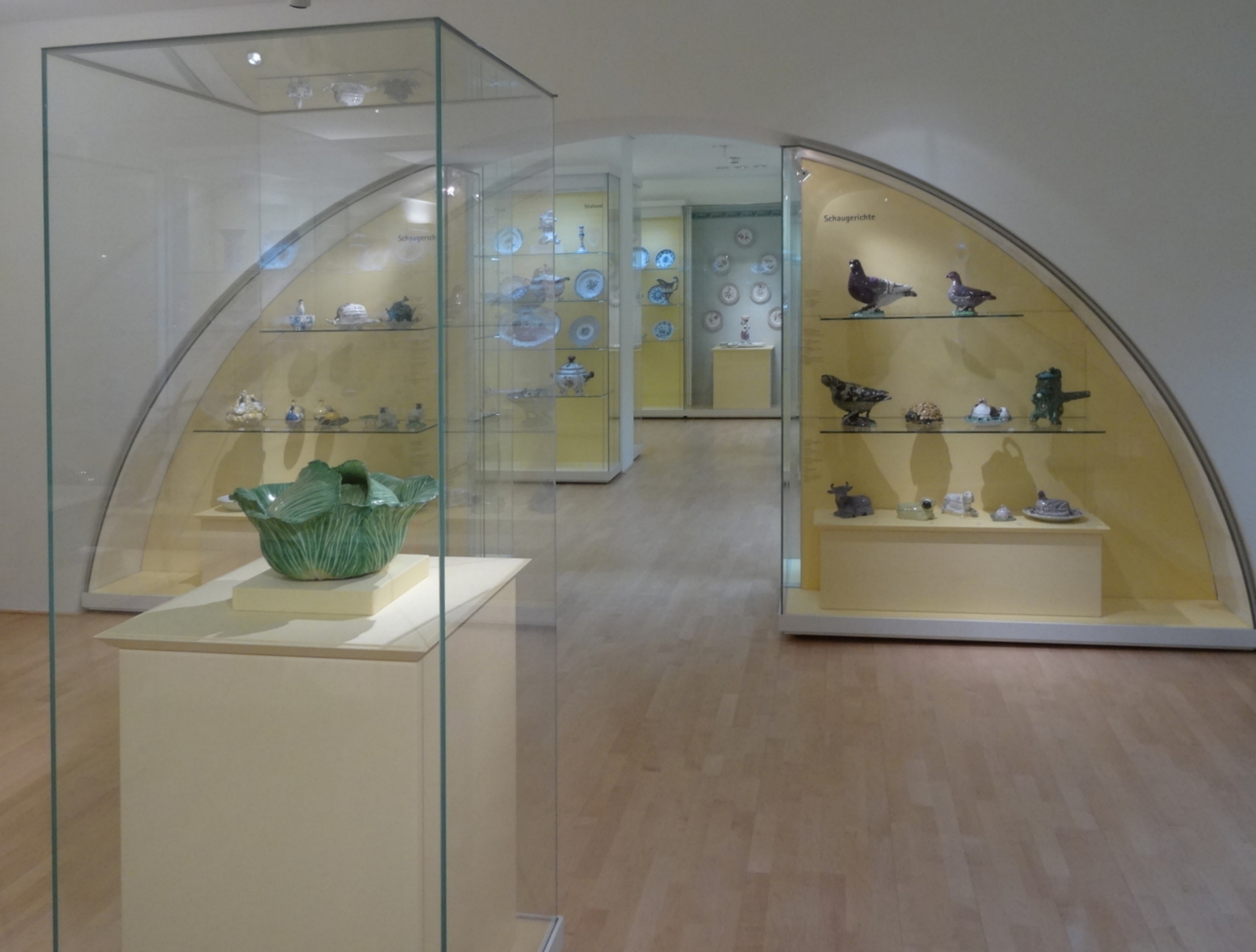
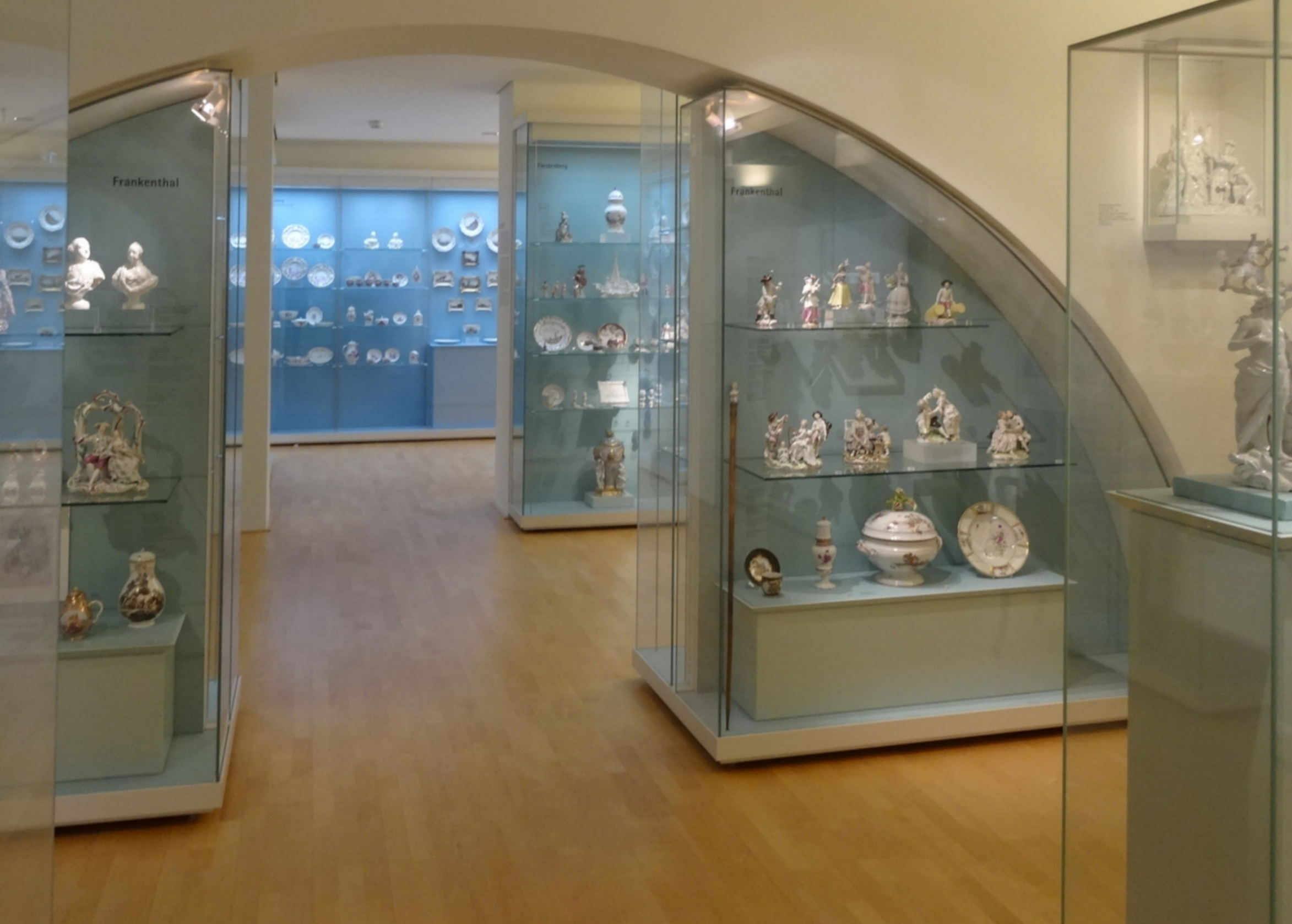

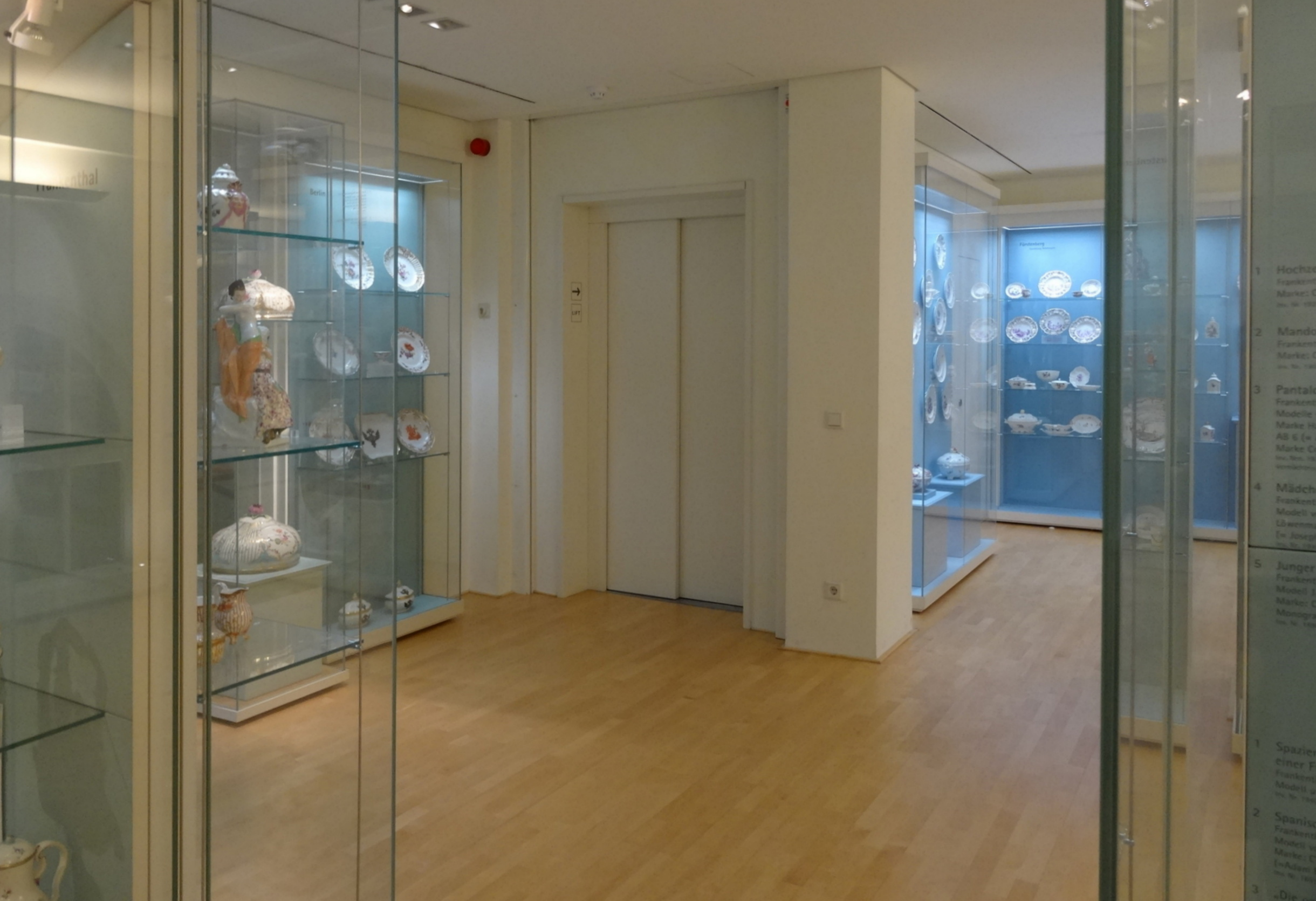

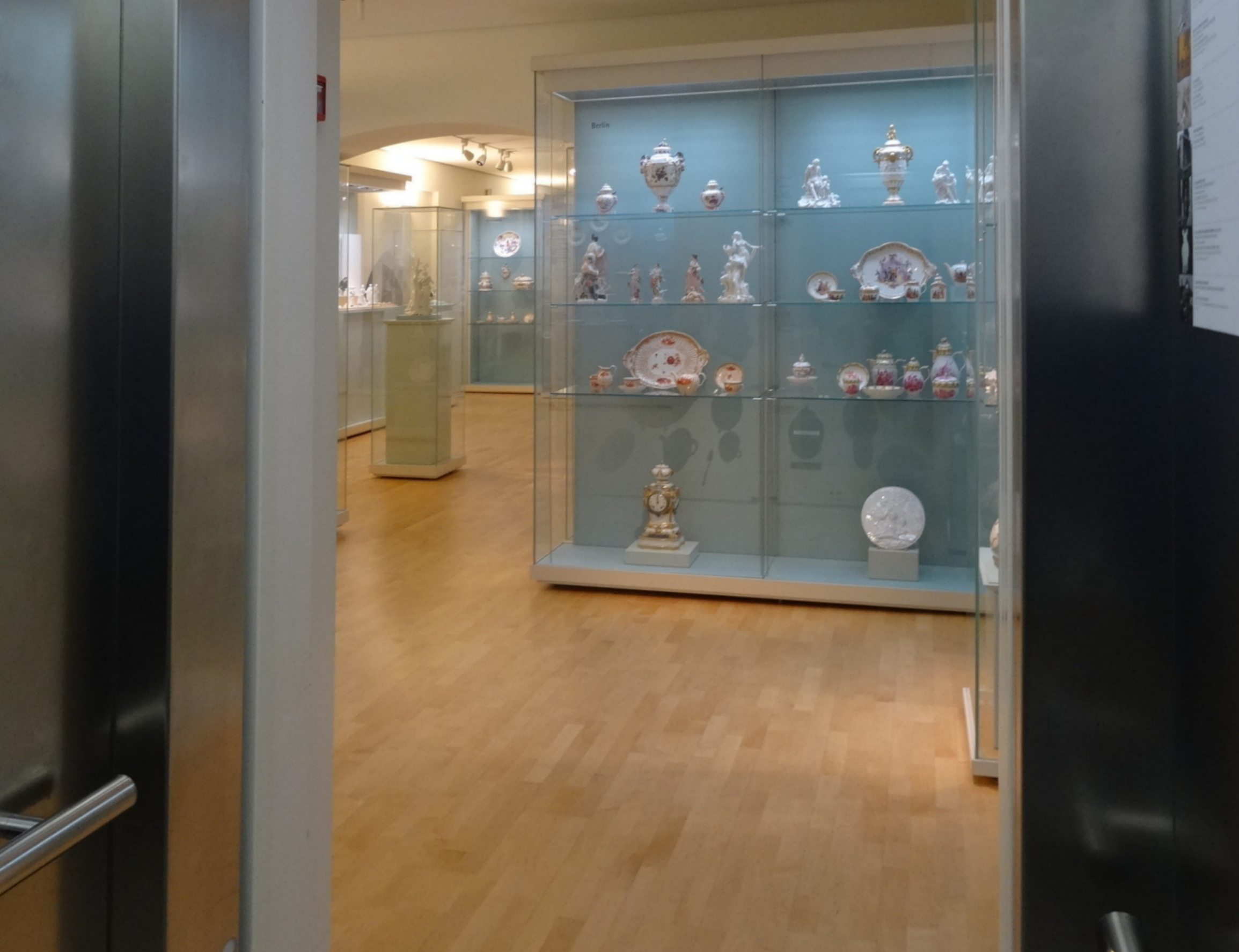
- Islam: the centrepiece is a collection of 71 tile fragments from the mausoleum of Buyan Kuli Chan (1348–1368) in Bukhara, Uzbekistan. The Islam section also includes pottery, carpets and books.
- Early 16th-century carpet from Lüne Abbey, displayed only once a year for a few days between Easter and Pentecost.
- Furniture by Henry van de Velde and Paul Gauguin.
- Japanese tea house and accompanying ceremony.
- Art Nouveau: an ensemble of Art Nouveau furniture and exhibits, the "Paris Room", much of it acquired at the world's fair in Paris in 1900. Including two greater-than-lifesized white sculptures from 1907, faience sculptures of girls by Richard Luksch, and the Swan Carpet (1897) by Otto Eckmann.
- The Modern, 1914–1945: Expressionist works, including animal sculptures by Richard Haizmann, a maplewood sculpture of a woman by Ernst Heckel, works by Karl Schmidt-Rottluff and Ewald Mataré, and everyday objects in Bauhaus style.
- Other collections include Baroque figurines; items from the Far East; design; book art; graphic art; photography; and antique pottery, weaponry and statues
