= Artists' Books Cooperative =

Artists' Books Cooperative (ABC) is an international network created by and for artists who make print-on-demand books. Founded in 2009 by German artist Joachim Schmid, the cooperative participates in book fairs and exhibitions predominantly in Europe and North America, and has been at the heart of a number of shows heralding a new age of photography and of artists' self-publishing projects.

ABC has received attention for its embracing of print-on-demand technology, an approach that runs counter to traditional offset printing and book publishing models in which artists can incur prohibitive costs.

== Current members ==
- Claudia de la Torre
- Arnaud Desjardin
- Oliver Griffin
- George Grace Gibson
- Mishka Henner
- Jonathan Lewis
- John Maclean
- MacDonaldStrand
- Micheál OʼConnell / Mocksim
- Monika Orpik
- Louis Porter
- Jonathan Schmidt-Ott
- David Schulz
- Travis Shaffer
- Wil Van Iersel
- Elsa Werth
- Jessica Williams
- Duncan Wooldridge
- Rahel Zoller
- Hermann Zschiegner

Past members include: Harvey Benge, Erik Benjamins, Julie Cook, Joshua Deaner, Deanna Dikeman, Eric Doeringer, Fred Free, Kate Glicksberg, Burkhard von Harder, Dawn Kim, Tanja Lazetic, EJ Major, Michael Maranda, Lydia Moyer, Heidi Neilson, Robert Pufleb, Joachim Schmid, Andreas Schmidt, Victor Sira, Paul Soulellis, Katya Stuke & Oliver Sieber, Andrea Stultiens, Elisabeth Tonnard, Corinne Vionnet, Mariken Wessels, Bruno Zhu

== Exhibitions ==
The multi-volume, collaborative project ABCEUM was included in the 2014 Brighton Photo Biennial (October–November) at Circus Street Market, Brighton. ABC was one of five photography collectives represented.

ABCED, a collaborative work by ABC in honor of Ed Ruscha's 75th birthday, was included in the exhibition Ed Ruscha, Books & Co. at Gagosian Gallery, New York (March–April 2013).

In 2011, a number of artists from the cooperative participated in the From Here On exhibition, curated by ABC founder Schmid Martin Parr, Erik Kessels, Joan Fontcuberta and Clément Chéroux at Rencontres d'Arles. Print-on-demand books by ABC members Mishka Henner, Hermann Zschiegner, Andreas Schmidt and Micheál OʼConnell / Mocksim (who was not an ABC member at that time) were included. Books by Fred Free, Katja Stuke, Lydia Moyer, Jonathan Lewis, and Travis Shaffer were also on display in the Atelier de mécanique exhibition space.

The cooperative was included in a self-titled exhibition at Printed Matter in New York in June 2011. Over 80 titles were on view by ABC members Andrea Stultiens, Schmidt, Böhm/Kobayashi, Burkhard von Harder, David Schulz, Deanna Dikeman, EJ Major, Elisabeth Tonnard, Erik Benjamins, Fred Free, Benge, Hermann Zschiegner, Jean Keller, Schmid, Jochen Friedrich, Jonathan Lewis, Joshua Deaner, Julie Cook, Kate Glicksberg, Lydia Moyer, Mariken Wessels, Michael Maranda, Mishka Henner, Robert Pufleb, T. R. Ericsson, Travis Shaffer, Victor Sira, and Wil van Iersel.

== Gallery ==
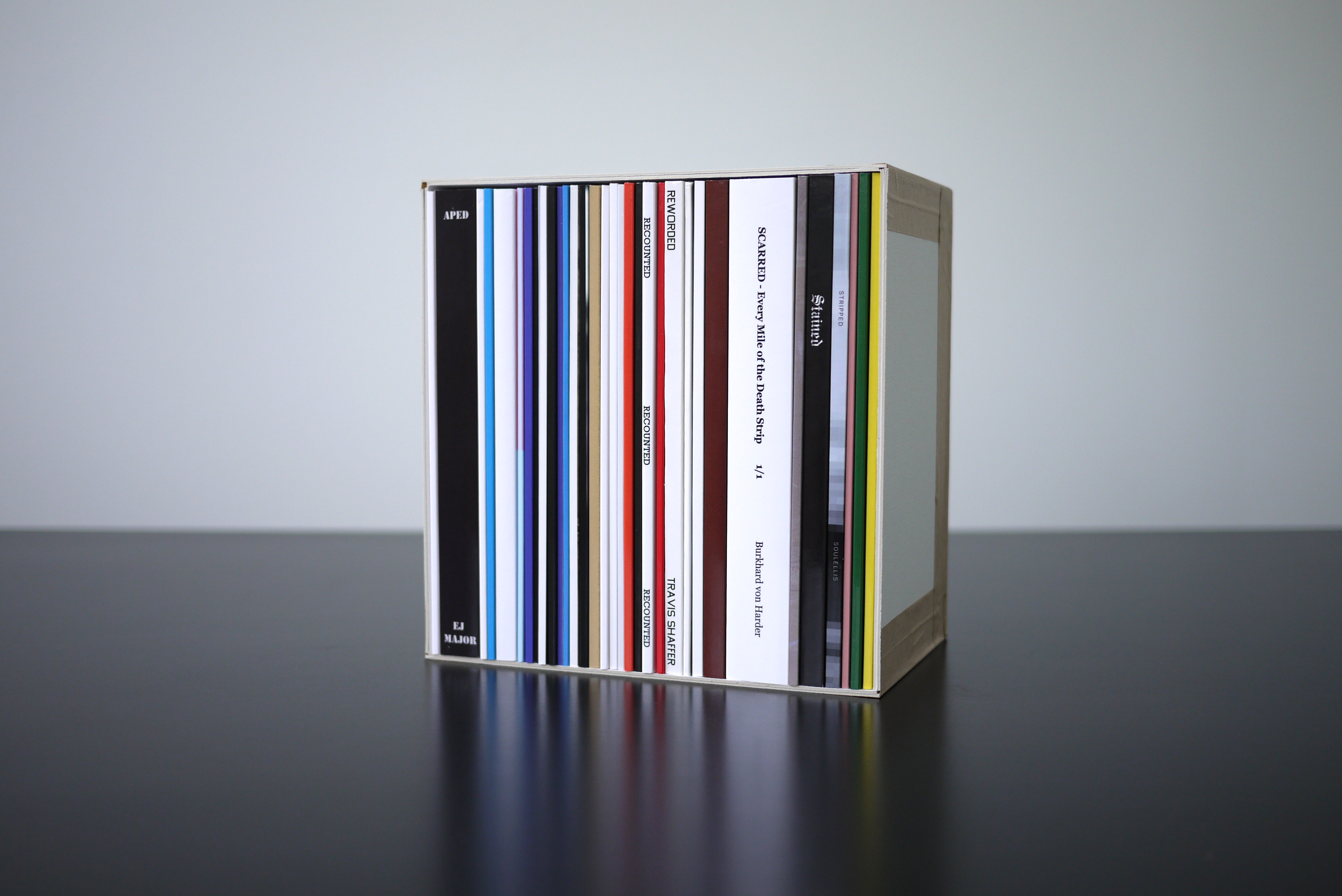
ABCED (2013)

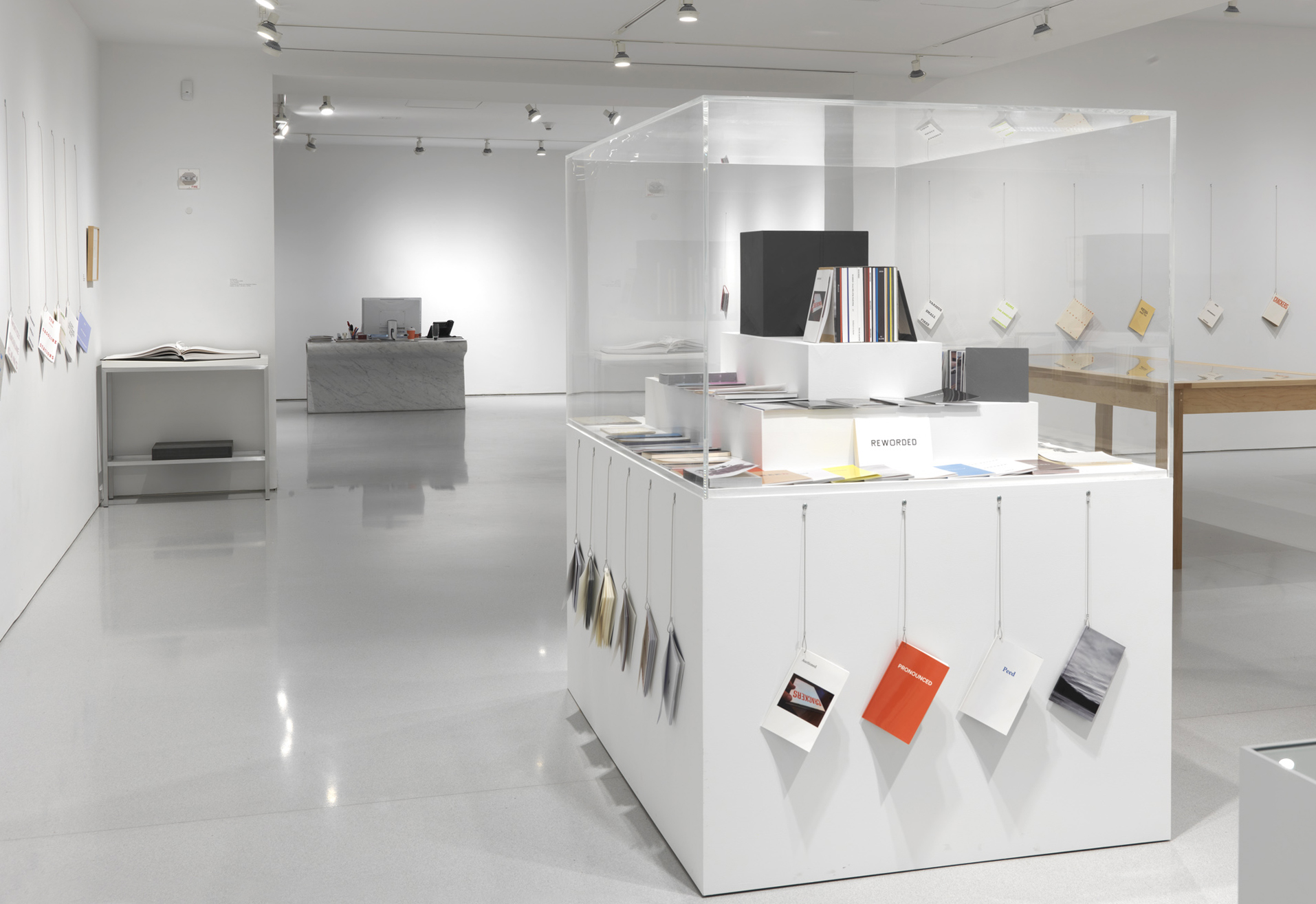
ABCED installation at Gagosian Gallery, Madison Avenue, New York, 14 March 2013.

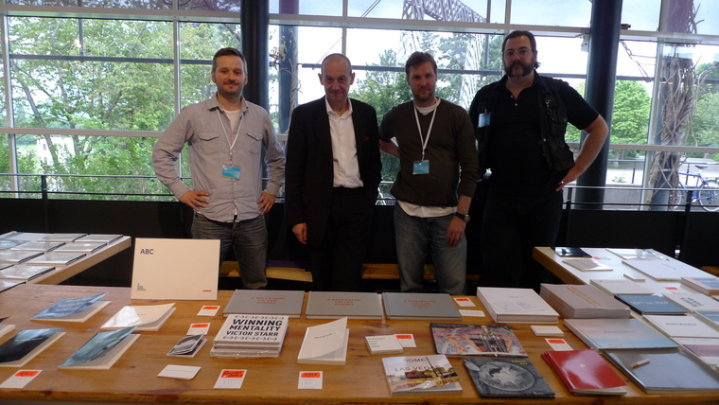
ABC artists at the Kassel Fotobuch Festival, 2010.
