= Andreas Schmidt (artist) =

German artist

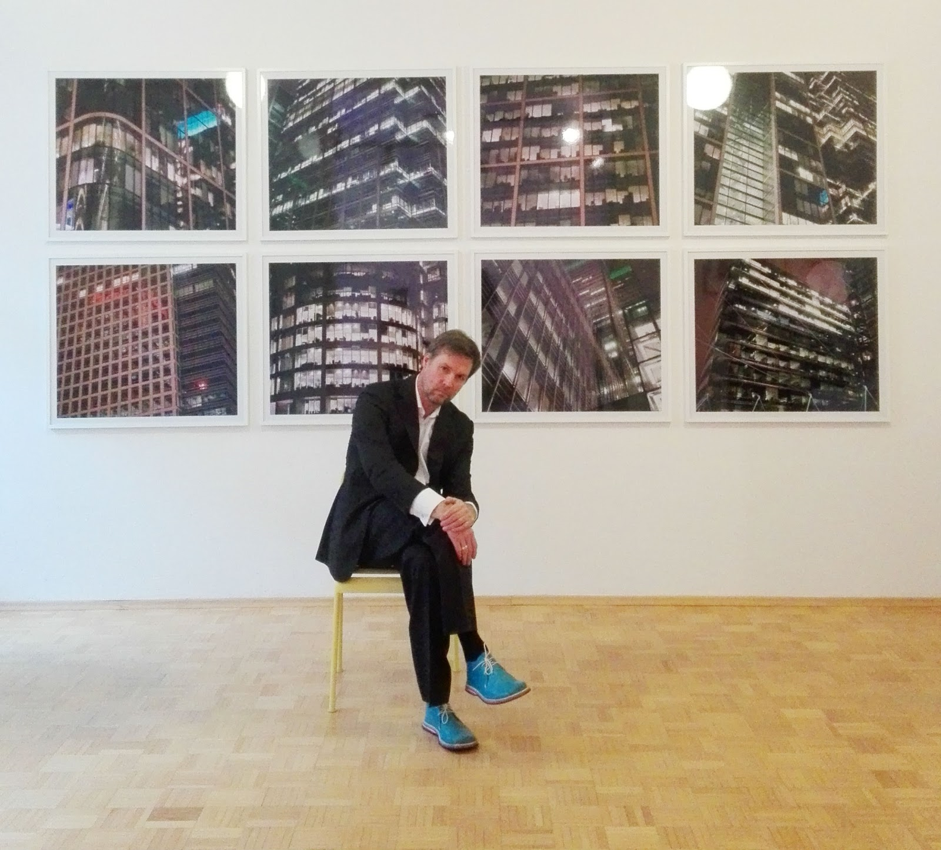
- The City by Andreas Schmidt (artist)
- Born: 19 July 1967 (age 59); Werneck, Germany
- Known for: Conceptual art, appropriation art, contemporary art, photography and video
- Website: Online Galerie

Andreas Schmidt is a Berlin based artist and gallerist.

== Biography ==
Schmidt received a first class Bachelor of Arts (Photography) degree from Nottingham Trent University, School of Art and Design in 1992, after having moved to England from Germany in 1989. Schmidt's early work consisted mainly of straight analogue photography with a later shift in his art practice from 2008 onward towards appropriation, performance, print-on-demand artist's books and video.

== Work ==
In 2005 German fine art and photography book publisher Hatje Cantz, published his first hard-back monograph Las Vegas to international critical acclaim. In the accompanying essay, Christoph Ribbat states about Schmidt's photography: "His work hints at the soberness of the New Topographics, the humor of New Color, the clever objectivity of newer German photo art." Described by J. G. Ballard as "the poet of the hotel corridor", Schmidt's second book, The City was published by Hatje Cantz in 2009 and presents dystopian interior and exterior photographs of London's financial district.

Schmidt was a founding member of ABC Artists' Books Cooperative in early 2009 and left the group in 2014. His work was shown at the From Here On group show at Les Rencontres d'Arles, Arles in 2011, Fotomuseum Antwerp, Antwerp in 2012 and Arts Santa Monica, Barcelona in 2013 curated by Martin Parr, Joachim Schmid, Joan Fontcuberta, Erik Kessels and Clément Chéroux, showcasing art works by 36 artists (Mishka Henner, Penelope Umbrico, Doug Rickard, Corinne Vionnet, Thomas Mailaender, Willem Popelier, Constant Dullaart, Jon Rafman, etc.) The exhibition, included a large panel triptych by Schmidt called "RGB". In 2011, Schmidt's artist book Four Seasons featured in Photo-Eye's books of the year 2011 list and Schmidt's artist book The Cost of Photobooks: A History Volume II was listed by Le Monde as one of the 10 best photo books of 2011.

On 14 November 2013 Schmidt launched GESAMTBUCHKUNSTWERKSKULPTUR, a custom-made shelving unit containing 77 artist's books at Offprint Paris.

His artist book The Time Machine was included in the group exhibition A History of Photography: Series and Sequences at the Victoria and Albert Museum in London in 2015 which also featured work by Nicholas Nixon, August Sander, Eadweard Muybridge and Lewis Baltz among others.

Schmidt's work is held in a number of private and public collections including the Victoria and Albert Museum, London, UK, FRAC Centre, Orléans, France, Centre Des Livres Artistes, Saint-Yrieix-la-Perche, France, Minnesota Center for Book Arts, Minneapolis, USA. After having lived in London for 22 years, Schmidt moved to Berlin in 2014 and opened Galerie Andreas Schmidt specializing in photography and contemporary art in 2016.

== Publications ==
- Camera Austria 45, Vienna, Austria, 1993
- Surface – Contemporary Photographic Survey, Booth-Clibborn Editions, United Kingdom, 1996
- Eyemazing ‘Built’, Issue 2, Spring 2004
- Las Vegas, (monograph), Hatje Cantz, Germany, 2005
- The City, (monograph), Hatje Cantz, Germany, 2009
- Various Small Books Referencing Various Small Books by Ed Ruscha, MIT press, USA, 2013
- From Here On, PostPhotography in an Age of Internet and the Mobile Phone, RM/Arts Santa Monica, Spain, 2013
- Post-Photography: The Artist with a Camera, Laurence King, United Kingdom, 2014
- Ego-Update, Verlag der Buchhandlung Walther Koenig, Germany, 2016.

== Exhibitions ==
- 2017 Fotofestival Lodz 2017, Lodz, Poland ‘Books to Play with’ (Group)
- 2015 Ego Update, NRW Duesseldorf, Germany (Group)
- 2014 Brighton Photo Biennial, Brighton (Group)
- 2013 Minnesota Center for Book Arts, Directed: The Intersection of Bookart and Film, Minnesota, USA
- 2013 Centre Des Livres Artistes, Saint-Yrieix-la-Perche, France images / images of images / no images (Group)
- 2013 Gagosian Gallery, NYC, USA ‘Ed Ruscha Books & Co.’ (Group)
- 2012 Photographers’ Gallery, London, UK ‘The Animated Gif’ (Group)
- 2012 The Cleveland Museum of Art, Ohio, USA ‘Photographers & Books’ (Group)
- 2011 Les Rencontres d'Arles, France ‘From Here On’ (Group)
- 2011 Kunsthalle Schweinfurt, Germany, ‘Parallel Natur’- (Solo with Herbert Mehler)
- 2008 Goethe Institut, London, UK (Solo)
