= Micheál OʼConnell / Mocksim =

Irish artist and academic

Micheál O’Connell
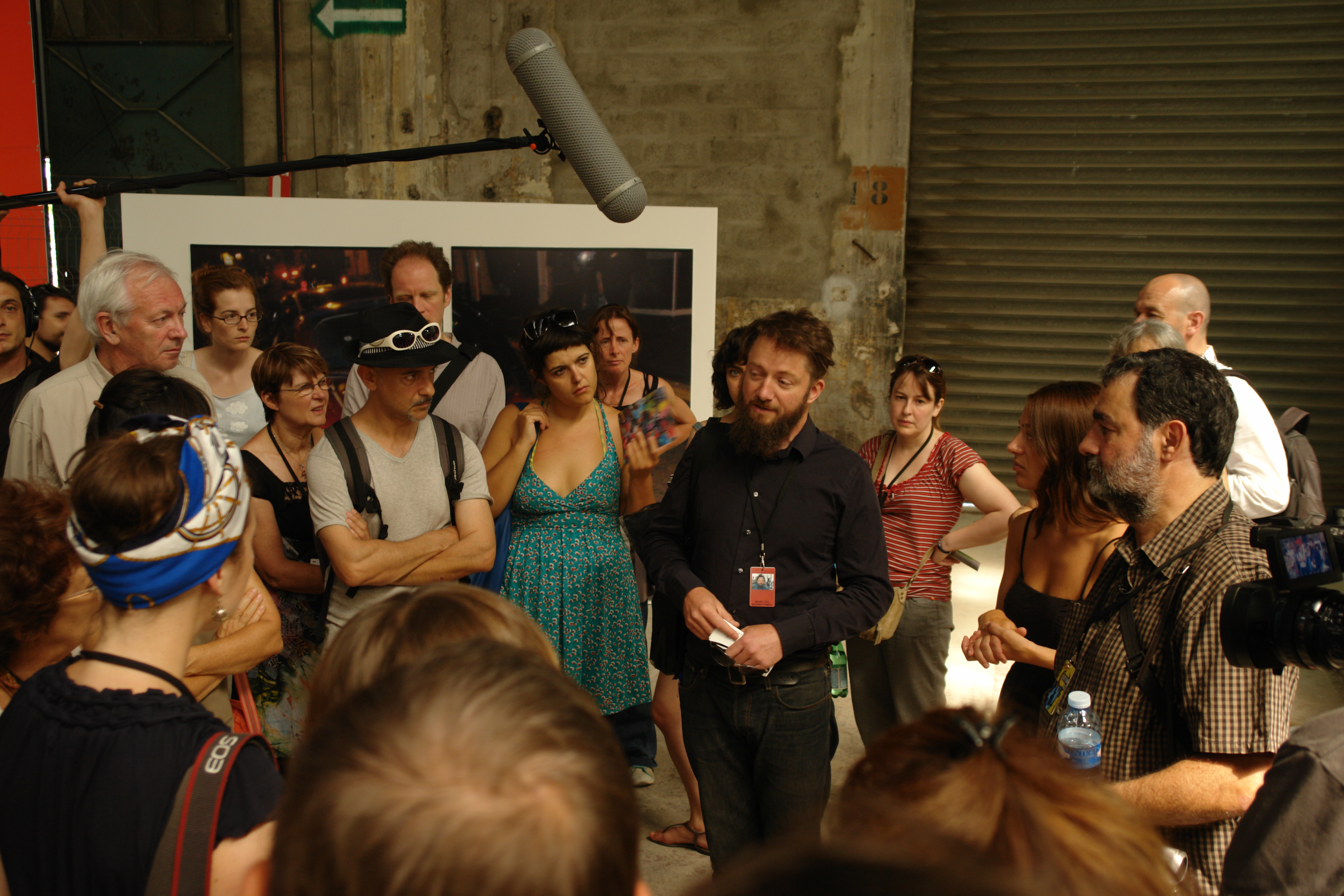
- Micheál O’Connell in 2011
- Born: Ireland
- Known for: Technology art, conceptual and media art, digital art
- Notable work: Contra-Invention, System Interference
- Movement: Contemporary art
- Website: mocksim.org

Micheál O’Connell (also known as Mocksim) is an Irish artist and academic. His practice involves 'interfering with' everyday systems through the misuse and repurposing of technological, bureaucratic, and infrastructural processes.

== Career ==
O’Connell's exhibition System Interference (2022–24) was commissioned and supported by the Arts Council of Ireland. The project toured three publicly funded regional art centres: Uillinn: West Cork Arts Centre, Wexford Arts Centre, and Highlanes Gallery, Drogheda, and was accompanied by a monograph by John Roberts (philosopher), Art, Misuse and Technology: Micheál O’Connell's 'System Interference'. In this study, Roberts situates O’Connell's practice within debates on art and technology, drawing comparisons with the satirical strategies of Irish writer Flann O'Brien, particularly his comedic reflections on technology and bureaucracy. The project and O’Connell's approach have also been discussed in academic and critical forums, including the Nordic Journal of Aesthetics and by David Garcia on the New Tactical Research blog.

The exhibition received coverage in the Irish press. The Irish Independent described the Highlanes presentation as “causing a stir” in Drogheda, while its showing at Wexford Arts Centre was reported as “dividing opinion.”

Earlier work includes Contra-Invention, exhibited at the Rencontres d'Arles in 2011 and in the survey exhibition following that, a version of From Here On specifically curated by Joan Fontcuberta, in Barcelona. The catalogue for the project was included in Martin Parr's “Best Books of 2010” and the project was longlisted for the Deutsche Börse Photography Prize in 2012.

O’Connell has presented work at institutions including the Whitechapel Gallery and Matt's Gallery in London, namely Live Art performances, as well as 'blended reality' and mixed exhibitions at Lighthouse in Brighton and Wandesford Quay Gallery in Cork (city). He is an Emeritus Professor at the University of Sussex, where he previously served as Head of Creative and Critical Practice. He is a member of ABC Artists' Books Cooperative and The London Group, and a Fellow of the Cybernetics Society.

== Recognition ==
- System Interference commissioned and funded by the Arts Council of Ireland, touring three regional centres.
- Coverage in the Irish Independent for its presentations at Drogheda and Wexford.
- Contra-Invention exhibited at Rencontres d'Arles (2011) and included in From Here On (Barcelona).
- Contra-Invention book included in Martin Parr's photo-eye's “Best Books of 2010”.
- Longlisted for the Deutsche Börse Photography Prize (2012).
- Subject of John Roberts’ monograph Art, Misuse and Technology: Micheál O’Connell's 'System Interference'.
