= Mishka Henner =

Belgian artist and photographer

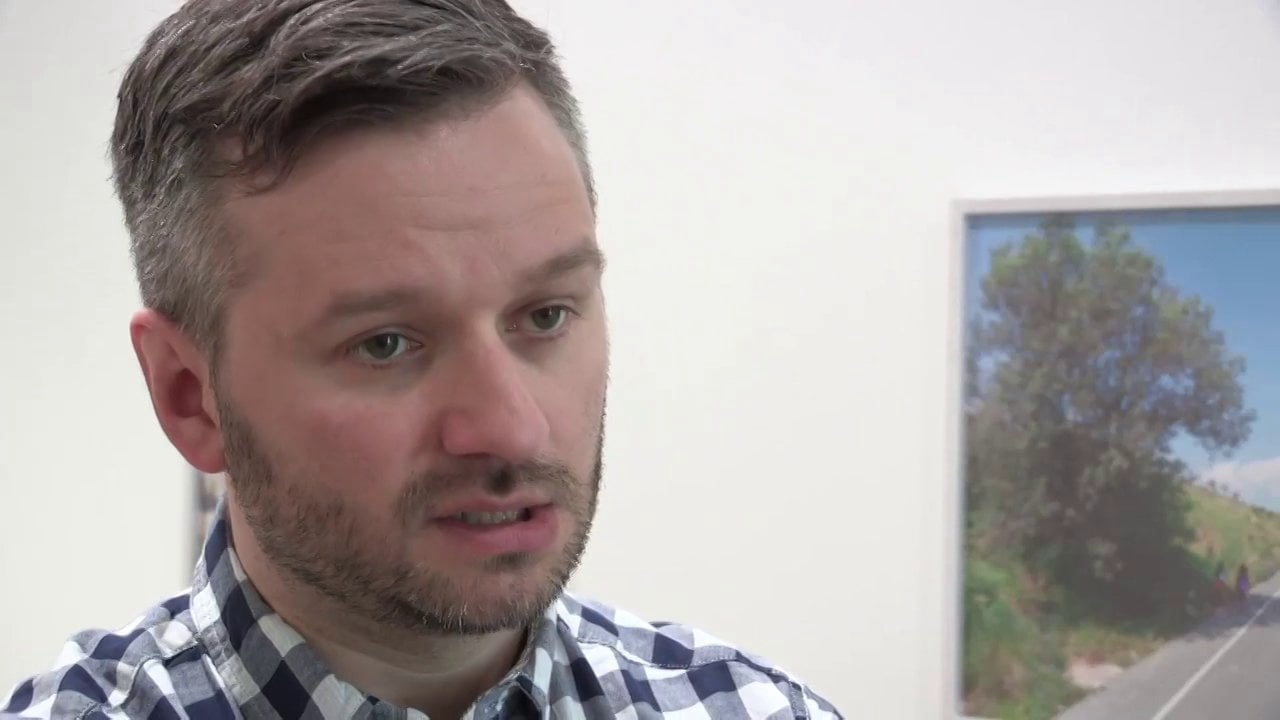
- Henner in 2013
- Born: Brussels, Belgium
- Known for: visual art, conceptual art, appropriation art, documentary photography, postinternet
- Notable work: Photography Is, Fifty-One US Military Outposts, Dutch Landscapes, Eighteen Pumpjacks, Less Américains, Astronomical, Feedlots, I'm Not the Only One, The Fertile Image, The Conductor
- Awards: Kleine Hans Award 2011, ICP Infinity Award for Art 2013

Mishka Henner (born 8 June 1976) is a British and French artist,living and working in Manchester, England. His work has featured in several surveys of contemporary artists working with photography in the internet age. His work uses photography, found and networked imagery, satellite and surveillance systems, artificial intelligence and live data. His practice has featured in surveys of photography in the internet age, including Ocean of Images: New Photography 2015 at the Museum of Modern Art, New York.

Henner was shortlisted for the Deutsche Börse Photography Prize in 2013 and the Prix Pictet in 2014, and received the International Center of Photography's Infinity Award for Art in 2013.

== Education and early career ==
Henner studied sociology at Loughborough University from 1994 to 1997 and at Goldsmiths College from 1997 to 1998. In 2003 he visited Cruel and Tender at Tate Modern, a survey of twentieth-century documentary photography which he later identified as an important influence on his decision to work with photography.

Between 2004 and 2010, Henner worked with photographer Liz Lock on documentary projects in London and the North West of England and on editorial commissions for British newspapers. In 2008 they joined the documentary photography agency Panos Pictures, becoming Profile photographers for the agency in 2010. They left Panos in 2012.

During this period Henner became increasingly interested in how photographs circulate and are reused, and began working with existing imagery, online databases, print-on-demand publishing and artists' books.

== Key works ==
Since 2010, Henner's work has examined photography in relation to the internet, automated imaging systems and digital networks. Early projects used search engines, Google Earth and Google Street View, while subsequent works have incorporated online video, live camera feeds, eye-tracking, artificial intelligence and environmental data.

=== Photography Is ===
In February 2010, Henner released Photography Is, presenting “more than 3,000 phrases that define one of the most democratic and ubiquitous of all art forms. Mirroring the ambiguous and untrustworthy nature of photographs themselves, each phrase in this book has been torn from the context in which it originally appeared. The result is contradictory and chaotic, frustrating and insightful. In short, it is photography, without photographs.”.

Reviewing the work in Fotokritik in March 2010, the German artist Joachim Schmid wrote, “The sheer volume and diversity of quotes are a great reflection of photography itself: sometimes intelligent, sometimes stupid, sometimes simple, sometimes complicated, serious, funny, poetic, romantic – as diverse, different and contradictory as the people who utter them.".

In 2015, an installation of Photography Is featured in the Qu'est-ce que la photographie (What is photography?) exhibition curated by Clément Chéroux and Karolina Ziebinska-Lewandowska at the Centre Georges Pompidou in Paris. In the accompanying catalogue published by the Centre Georges Pompidou and Éditions Xavier Barral, the curators wrote that Henner's work inspired the exhibition:

"C'est probablement Mishka Henner qui a mieux mis en évidence le caractère pléthorique des réponses suscitées par la question <<Qu'est-ce que la photographie?>> En 2010, cet artiste, né en 1976, et qui, depuis près d'une décennie, explore les potentialites créatives de l'Internet, entrait le segment de phrase <<Photography is>> dans un moteur de rechereche afin de recueillir ses multiples occurances sur la toile. Le résultat est un livre d'artiste de 192 pages réunissant plus de trois mille réponses a la question ontologique - sur les trois millions et quelque générées par l'interface [...] Le présent projet s'inspire, a sa manière, du livre de Henner."

"The surplus of responses elicited by the question "What is photography?" is probably best expressed by Mishka Henner. In 2010, the artist born in 1976 who has spent close to a decade exploring the creative potential of the internet, entered the phrase "Photography is" into a search engine and collected all responses. The result is an artist's book of 192 pages containing more than 3,000 phrases responding to the ontological question [...] In a way, the present project is inspired by Henner's book."

In February 2016, the International Center of Photography in New York announced a site-specific installation of Henner's Photography Is. Spanning nearly 70 feet, text from the book was placed across the construction shed during the building of the ICP's new museum space on the Bowery until its opening in June 2015. Passers-by were invited to participate in an interactive experience via a live Twitter feed, contributing their own definitions and opinions on what photography is. The museum described Photography Is as "a surprisingly poetic and thought-provoking meditation on how the subject is discussed throughout our culture."

=== Fifty-One US Military Outposts ===
In 2010, Henner published Fifty-One US Military Outposts and described it in the following manner: "Overt and covert military outposts used by the United States in fifty-one different countries across the world. Sites located and gathered from information available in the public domain, official US military and veterans' websites and forums, domestic and foreign news articles, and official and leaked government documents and reports." Writing in The Huffington Post in 2014, Peter Yeung wrote: "Henner takes these satellite images and then transforms them by altering and artistically-enhancing the colours, lending them an unexpected, lyrical beauty; without ever altering the specific physical details of images. He explains that projects such as these exploit 'loopholes in the vast archives of data, connecting the dots to reveal things that surround us but which we rarely see.' It is a role reversal, citizens rather than governments doing it, that exposes the ease with which any sort of information can be obtained."

A portfolio of the series was acquired by the New York Public Library in 2013 and was included in the Library's 2014 exhibition Public Eye: 175 Years of Sharing Photography.

Reflecting on the series in the British Journal of Photography, Paul Wombell wrote, "Mishka Henner has used freely available aerial imagery from satellite systems such as Google Earth for many of his projects. For 51 US Military Outposts, he used information available from official US military and veterans’ websites and forums, domestic and foreign news articles, and official and leaked government documents and reports to picture US military bases around the world. These bases are part of the semi-secret locations that mark the present power of the US military. Henner's intention was to depict this world from a military perspective, a world of pure strategy and logistics that controls space from above and below."

Reviewing an installation of Fifty-One US Military Outposts at the Carroll/Fletcher Gallery in London, George Vasey wrote, "We hover over the image, inverting the surveillance-like gaze – the watched become observers. The project shifts the public documentarism articulated by Frank and Lange towards the unseen spaces of private finance and security [...] The ability to navigate and edit data provides new conditions of political accountability in an era of information as capital. Henner’s work recalls Eyal Weizman’s reading of the politics of verticality in relation to the Israel occupation of Palestine. For Weizman, power is structured around a vertical axis by asserting sovereignty over the land (through archeology) and surveillance (by controlling the elevated spaces and skyline). Henner’s images of military sites dramatise this verticality by inviting the spectator to look down at things shot from above."

=== No Man's Land ===
In 2011, Henner released No Man’s Land, a collection of photographs apparently showing sex workers around Spain and Italy, as captured by Google's Street View cameras and published as a print-on-demand book.

The work quickly gained notoriety online and featured on numerous blogs and news websites. American journalist and author Violet Blue described the work as haunting “snapshots of the unseen, and yes, the unheard” whilst Pulitzer Prize nominated photojournalist Alan Chin (photographer) described Henner as “a conceptual photographer-artist masturbator.”

Writing in Prison Photography in August 2011, Pete Brook wrote, "for traditionalists, No Man’s Land is a long way from the spirit of documentary photography [...] On Henner’s virtual tour, we cruise, at 50mph. We don’t stop, we don’t get out the car and we don’t get too close. We might as well be in another country … which of course we are [...] Henner’s work allows us to keep a safe distance. He even saves us the trouble of finding these scenes on our own computer screens; we’re detached one step beyond. We are cheap consumers." In a separate post, Jörg Colberg added, “Henner essentially is producing visual statistics, with the women in question being reduced to ciphers, to small, often blurred, shapes that come with a label."

In April 2012, Pete Brook published email correspondence between himself and Henner, in which the artist mounted a defence of his work. “There’s a section of the photo community judging No Man’s Land according to a pretty narrow set of criteria,” wrote Henner. “So narrow they’re avoiding one of the elephants in the room, which is what role is left for the street photographer in the age of Google Street View?”

In 2012, Henner published a second print-on-demand volume of No Man’s Land and was shortlisted for the prestigious Deutsche Börse Photography Prize. Writing about the shortlist for 1000 Words Photography Magazine, Brad Feuerhelm wrote, “No Man’s Land would be a convincingly clever interpretation of lucid geography, technocracy (albeit with lightweight theoretical drive) if I had not seen very similar modes of dissemination before. Not only is it derivative but the project completes a vicious circle of unpleasant attitudes of human currency and a new attempt to denigrate women to that of commerce even further.”

Despite these negative reviews, No Man's Land was shortlisted for the prestigious Deutsche Börse Photography Prize in 2013 and several writers offered more positive insights. Reviewing volume I of No Man’s Land for Source magazine, Daniel Jewsbury wrote:

“I’d argue that Henner’s photographs articulate a very subtle but persuasive challenge to the manner in which we all become ‘resources’ to capital in the contemporary world, what the philosopher Martin Heidegger called a ‘standing reserve’: how, ultimately, we are all merely data to be processed and presented and somehow used. The prostitute, then, is simply presented as an instance of an ‘ideal subject’, as indeed she has been throughout the history of modern capitalism: simultaneously a small entrepreneur who is also her own product, and necessarily a consumer too. No Man’s Land, seen through this lens, is a layer on the map of technological capitalism, a cartography of its reach and its complex interconnections.”

In a lengthy article published in the online journal Circulation Exchange in 2015, Kate Albers reflected that the series “uniquely addresses the uncomfortable collision of public and private space and experience that now characterizes much of our collective lived experience, and wades, too, into the grim realities of the commerce and commodity of physical bodies in the 21st century.”

=== Less Américains ===
Henner created further controversy in early 2012 with the publication of Less Américains. In this self-published work, the artist erased much of the content of 83 photographs from Robert Frank's celebrated photobook, The Americans, leaving only occasional remnants of the historic images. In an interview with the New York Times, he describes the erasure of Frank's photobook as an homage to Robert Rauschenberg who similarly created controversy in 1953 with his work Erased de Kooning Drawing. Henner discusses the work in terms of blurring the boundaries of authorship and ownership:

I don’t know if anyone has examined Frank’s images as much as I did ... one of the things that really struck me was playing with shape and texture almost in a way that a painter works. I’m making very active choices about what kind of shape and textures I want to have ... I started to place my images next to Frank’s and sure enough there were things that you simply wouldn’t have notice before. It suddenly takes on a whole new significance.

The Americans is one of documentary photography's most revered works and Henner's book resulted in mixed reviews. The Guardian's Sean O'Hagan described it as "either inspired or provocative-to-the-point-of-insulting to the original" whilst Colin Pantall, writing in the British Journal of Photography, described it as "a Churchillian proclamation that far from being over, photography has barely begun." A review by Jeffrey Ladd in Time ended by evaluating the work in relation to Jack Kerouac's own words written in the 1958 introduction which accompanied the first US edition of Frank's book:

What poem this is, what poems can be written about this book of pictures some day by some young new writer high by candlelight bending over them describing every grey mysterious detail.

=== Feedlots ===
In 2012, Henner began researching oil fields and feedlots in the US, culminating in a cover-feature for the worldwide edition of Vice Magazine's Hopelessness issue in December 2012. In a Los Angeles Times Op-Ed, Henner described how he began working on the series:

"I first came across these feedlots on Google Earth and had no idea what I was seeing. The mass and density of the black and white dots seemed almost microbial. To understand what they were I had to learn about the meat industry and its methods for maximizing yield in the minimum amount of time for the highest profit [...] The meat industry is a subject loaded with a moral and ethical charge. But when I think of these pictures, I don't just see gigantic farms, I see an attitude toward life and death that exists throughout contemporary culture. These images reflect a blueprint and a horror that lie at the heart of the way we live."

Investigative journalist Will Potter described the series as the inspiration behind a successful Kickstarter campaign to use drones to photograph US factory farms from the air, bypassing controversial ag-gag laws in place to prevent, amongst other things, the photographing of factory farms.

Discussing the series for Edible Geography, Nicola Twilley wrote:

"In an era of “ag-gag” laws, in which industrial-scale meat producers have persuaded several compliant state legislatures to make the act of documenting animal facilities with defamatory intent a crime, Earth’s manmade constellation of satellites may yet provide the only documentation of the landscapes that agri-business would rather keep hidden. Redefining the act of photography is not just a philosophical conceit in this instance; it is a necessary progression to continue the photographer’s work of helping us see the world."

In 2014 pictures from Henner's Feedlots and Oil Fields series were shortlisted for the 2014 Prix Pictet.

=== I'm Not the Only One ===
I'm Not the Only One (2015) is a single-channel video made from eighteen videos found on YouTube in which individuals separately perform Sam Smith's song of the same name. Henner digitally combined the recordings so that the solitary performers appear to sing together as an unknowing virtual choir.

In 2020, Fraenkel Gallery used the title of Henner's work for a group exhibition about isolation and connection. The gallery described Henner's video as transforming separate performances made in bedrooms and improvised studios into an immaterial chorus.

=== Seven Seas and a River ===
Henner returned to networked and satellite imagery in a number of environmental works during the late 2010s. Turbines (2017–18) and Solar (2018) depict renewable-energy infrastructure across the American landscape using satellite imagery.

Seven Seas and a River (2018) is an installation consisting of eight continuously streaming online cameras directed at bodies of water around the world. The work was commissioned for Fotografia Europea in Reggio Emilia and presented at the Banca d'Italia. The live feeds included views of the Pacific and North Atlantic oceans, the Barents, Adriatic, Caribbean and Celtic seas and the Saint Lawrence River.

In the related work Landfall (2018), Henner combined satellite images of retired hurricanes with recordings of eyewitnesses, storm chasers and forecasters.

=== Sight Seeing ===
In Sight Seeing (2019–21), Henner used eye-tracking technology to record the movement of his gaze while looking at reproductions of paintings by Ellsworth Kelly. The resulting paths of attention were converted into laser-cut apertures placed over reproductions of the paintings, progressively revealing the original images.

The work was presented in a solo exhibition at Galerie Jean-Kenta Gauthier in Paris in 2021. The gallery described the project as treating looking itself as a creative act and using contemporary eye-tracking technology to reconsider questions of authorship and observation.

=== The Fertile Image ===
From 2020, Henner began using generative artificial intelligence as part of his work. The Fertile Image uses generative adversarial networks to produce successive visual descendants from pairs of source images, creating potentially unlimited image genealogies.

The project was first presented in Free Lunch at Galerie Jean-Kenta Gauthier in Paris in 2020. In 2022, Claire Guillot discussed the work in Le Monde, describing Henner's use of artificial intelligence to generate lineages of hybrid and chimeric forms.

Henner subsequently extended his work with synthetic imagery through projects including Influenzer (2022), in which generated faces were animated, and later works drawing on historical painting and religious iconography.

In 2026, these concerns formed the basis of Seeing is Believing. Vedere per credere, Henner's first solo exhibition in Italy, at Fondazione AGO in Modena. Curated by Chiara Dall'Olio, the exhibition examined photography and systems of belief in the era of generative artificial intelligence and included AI-generated images of biblical events and religious figures.

=== The Conductor ===
The Conductor (2024) is a live work that translates data from a worldwide lightning-detection network into percussion. Each recorded lightning strike produces a corresponding drum beat performed inside an acoustic chamber.

The work was developed through Henner's residency with the University of Salford's Energy House 2.0 research facility and was presented at the Sounds from the Other City festival in Salford in May 2024. Reviewing the work for Corridor8, Jack Nicholls described it as combining scientific equipment, environmental data and a deliberately physical audience experience.

== Publications ==
- Winning Mentality (2010)
- Photography Is (2010)
- Fifty-One US Military Outposts (2010)
- Dutch Landscapes (2011)
- Astronomical (2011)
- No Man's Land (2011)
- No Man's Land II (2012)
- Pumped (2012)
- Richtered (2012)
- Less Américains (2012)
- Putin's Prison (2022)

== Awards ==
- 2011: Kleine Hans Award
- 2013: Shortlisted for Deutsche Börse Photography Prize.
- 2013: Infinity Award, International Center of Photography.
- 2014: Shortlisted for Prix Pictet.

== Exhibitions ==
=== Solo exhibitions ===
2026

- Seeing is Believing. Vedere per credere, Fondazione AGO, Modena, Italy

2024

- Words and Pictures, Jean-Kenta Gauthier, Paris, France

2023

- Earth Works, Galerie Fotografic, Prague
- Energy Goast, Blue Sky Gallery, Portland, Oregon

2022

- Double Six, Galerie Jean-Kenta Gauthier

2021

- Sight Seeing, Jean-Kenta Gauthier, Paris, France

2019

- Your Only Chance to Survive is to Leave With Us, Galleria Bianconi, Milan

2018

- Free Fall, Galleria Bianconi, Milan
- Remote Possibilities Sune Jonsson Center for Documentary Photography, Västerbottens Museum, Umeå
- Seven Seas and a River, Fotografia Europea, Reggio Emilia
- Flat Earth Theory, Tosetti Value, Turin

2017

- Counter-Intelligence, Örebro Konsthall
- Search History, Airspace Gallery, Stoke-on-Trent

2016

- Less Américains, Silverstein/20, New York
- Field, Musée des Beaux Arts, Le Locle, Switzerland

2015

- Semi-Automatic, Bruce Silverstein Gallery, New York

2014

- Black Diamond, Carroll/Fletcher, London

2013

- Precious Commodities, Open-Eye Gallery, Liverpool, UK

2011

- No Man's Land, Hotshoe Gallery, London, UK

=== Selected group exhibitions ===
2026

- Beneath the Surface: Mining and American Photography, National Gallery of Art, Washington, D.C.
- Animal Model, Les Rencontres de la Photographie, Arles, France.
- Declaring America: 1776 and Beyond, New York Public Library, New York, US.
- Civilization: Our Life in Focus, Museum für Gestaltung, Zürich, Switzerland.
- Into the Time Horizon, Nevada Museum of Art, Reno, US.

2025

- American Photographs, Victoria and Albert Museum, London, UK.
- Energy House 2.0, Castlefield Gallery, Manchester, UK.
- Civilization: The Way We Live Now, Kunsthalle München, Munich, Germany.

2024

- Thump, Museum of Contemporary Art Busan, Busan, South Korea.
- Library of Artistic Print on Demand, Museum Villa Stuck, Munich, Germany.
- LOOK Climate Lab, Open Eye Gallery, Liverpool, UK.

2023

- Civilization: The Way We Live Now, Saatchi Gallery, London, UK.
- Is this real?, Fondazione Modena Arti Visive, Modena, Italy.
- #Ukraine: Images of War, Photo Elysée, Lausanne, Switzerland.

2022

- States of Disruption, Centre for Contemporary Photography, Melbourne, Australia.
- Seeing Stars, Stanley & Audrey Burton Gallery, Leeds, UK.
- Liberty, Equality, Biodiversity!, Art_Inkubator, Fotofestiwal Łódź, Poland.

2020

- I'm Not the Only One, Fraenkel Gallery, San Francisco
- Potential Worlds: Planetary Memories, Migros Museum für Gegenwartskunst, Zurich
- On Earth: Imaging, Technology and the Natural World, Foam Amsterdam
- The World to Come, DePaul Art Museum, Chicago

2019

- Cámara y Ciudad, Caixaforum, Barcelona
- Contrôle+Z, GwinZegal, Guingamp
- Another West, Fraenkel Gallery, San Francisco
- On Earth, Les Rencontres d’Arles
- Capitalist Realism, Thessaloniki Museum of Photography
- Civilization, Ullens Center for Contemporary Art, Beijing, China

2018

- Civilization, National Museum of Modern and Contemporary Art, Seoul
- The World to Come, Harn Museum of Art, Florida
- Animals & Us, Turner Contemporary, Margate
- Coder le Monde, Centre Pompidou, Paris
- At Altitude, Towner Art Gallery, Eastbourne
- Earth & Sky, Société, Brussels, Belgium
- Watching You Watching Me Bozar, Brussels
- Surveillance Index Le Bal, Paris

2017

- Green and Pleasant Land Towner Art Gallery, Eastbourne, UK
- The Cult of the Book Musée des Beaux Arts, Le Locle, Switzerland
- Les Nouveaux Encyclopédistes Chiostri di San Pietro, Reggio Emilia
- Watching You Watching Me, Museum für Fotografie, Berlin
- Britain in Focus: A Photographic History, National Media Museum, Bradford

2016

- Watched! Kunsthal Aarhus, Denmark
- The Edge of the Earth, Ryerson Image Center, Toronto
- Was ist fotografie heute? Pinakothek, Munich
- Yo quería ser fotógrafo, Fundació Foto Colectania, Barcelona
- Aerial Imagery in Print, 1860 to Today, MoMA, New York
- Ed Ruscha Books & Co Gagosian Gallery, Beverly Hills, California
- WATCHED! Surveillance Art and Photography in Europe After Nine-Eleven, Hasselblad Center, Göteborg
- Touch the Sky: Art and Astronomy, Frances Lehman Loeb Art Center, Vassar College, New York
- Safe and Sound, MUDAC, Lausanne, Switzerland
- Cornucopia, Shepparton Art Museum, Australia

2015

- Infosphere ZKM | Zentrum für Kunst und Medientechnologie, Karlsruhe
- Ocean of Images: New Photography 2015, MoMA, New York
- Public Eye New York Public Library, New York
- A History of Photography: Series and Sequences, V&A, London
- Une histoire, art, architecture et design, des années 80 à aujourd'hui, Centre Pompidou, Paris
- No Man Nature Fotografia Europea, Palazzo Mosto, Reggio Emilia
- Beyond Evidence, QUAD, Derby, UK
- Modern History vol. 1, Grundy Art Gallery, Blackpool, UK
- This Is War! Palazzo del Monte di Pietà, Italy
- Digital Conditions, Kunstverein Hannover, Germany
- Ed Ruscha: Books & Co., Gagosian, Paris
- Watching You Watching Me, Open Society Foundation, NYC
- Consumption, Museo Nacional de Arte, Mexico City
- Eighteen Pumpjacks, The Armory Show, New York
- The Hierarchy of Images, Galleria Foto Forum, Italy

2014

- ABCEUM, University of Brighton Gallery, UK
- Zelf weten, Galerie Ron Mandos, Amsterdam
- Consumption, Fondazione Sandretto Re Rebaudengo, Turin
- Images Vevey, Switzerland
- MANIFESTOS! Eine Andere Geschichte der Fotografie Fotomuseum Winterthur, Switzerland
- Consumption, Westbau, Zurich
- Consumption, Bernheimer Fine Art Photography, Munich
- Object Recognition, Sale Waterside
- (Mis)Understanding Photography: Works & Manifestos, Museum Folkwang, Essen
- They Used to Call it the Moon, Baltic [Link]
- Consumption: Prix Pictet 2014, Victoria & Albert Museum, London
- Now You See It: Photography and Concealment Metropolitan Museum of Art, New York
- In Context: The Portrait in Contemporary Photographic Practice Wellin Museum of Art

2013

- Drone: The Automated Image, Darling Foundry, Montreal, Canada
- Plotting from Above, McCord Museum, Montreal Canada
- Precious Commodities, Open Eye Gallery, Liverpool, UK
- Views From Above, Centre Pompidou-Metz, France
- A Different Kind of Order, International Center of Photography, New York
- Deutsche Börse Photography Prize 2013, The Photographers' Gallery, London

2012

- Photographers, Berwick Film and Media Arts Festival
- The Big Picture, Ars Electronica, Linz, Austria
- Work, Festival Internazionale di Roma, Museum of Contemporary Art, Rome, Italy
- Dutch Landscapes, Journées photographiques de Bienne, Switzerland
- David Horvitz's Bouquet, Border Gallery, Mexico City, Mexico, 2012. Organised by David Horvitz. Includes Anjum Asharia and Marisa Jahn, BFFA3AE, Claudia Sola, David Horvitz, Hans Aarsman, Jon Rafman, Kristina Lee Podesva, Marysia Lewandowska, Michael Mandiberg, Mishka Henner, Natalie Häusler and Vlatka Horvat.
- Live Stream, MediaCityUK, UK
- Appropriation: Questioning the Image, Fotogalerie Wien, Austria
- No Man's Land, Oregon Center for Photographic Arts, USA
- From Here On, FotoMuseum Antwerp, Belgium
- Let Us Keep Our Own Noon, Galerie West, Hague, Netherlands

2011

- No Man's Land, HotShoe Gallery, London, 2011
- From Here On, Rencontres d'Arles, France, 2011
- Dark Matter, Mews Project Space, London, 2011
- ABC Artists’ Books Cooperative, Printed Matter, New York, 2011
- Collateral Damage group exhibition, Look 11, Liverpool and International Festival of Journalism, Perugia, 2011. Curated by Paul Lowe and Harry Hardie. Included photographs from 51 US Bases as well as images by Lisa Barnard, Simon Norfolk, Tim Hetherington, Ziyah Gafić, Paul Lowe, Edmund Clark, Ashley Gilbertson, Brett Van Ort, Adam Broomberg and Olivier Chanarin.
- Political Absurd, Art & Culture Laboratory, Krk, Croatia, 2011
- Follow-Ed (after Hokusai), P74 Gallery, Ljubljana, Slovenia & Arnolfini, Bristol, 2011

== Public collections ==
Henner's work is held in the following public collections:

- Tate Gallery, London.
- Centre Georges Pompidou, Paris.
- Baltic Centre for Contemporary Art.
- National Art Library, Victoria and Albert Museum.
- Glasgow School of Art Library.
- Vassar College Library, New York.
- Cleveland Museum of Art, Cleveland, OH.
- Portland Art Museum, Portland, OR.
- Museum of Fine Arts, Houston, TX.
