= Centro Cultural Border =

Cultural space in Colonia Roma, Mexico City, Mexico

Centro Cultural Border (Border Cultural Center)
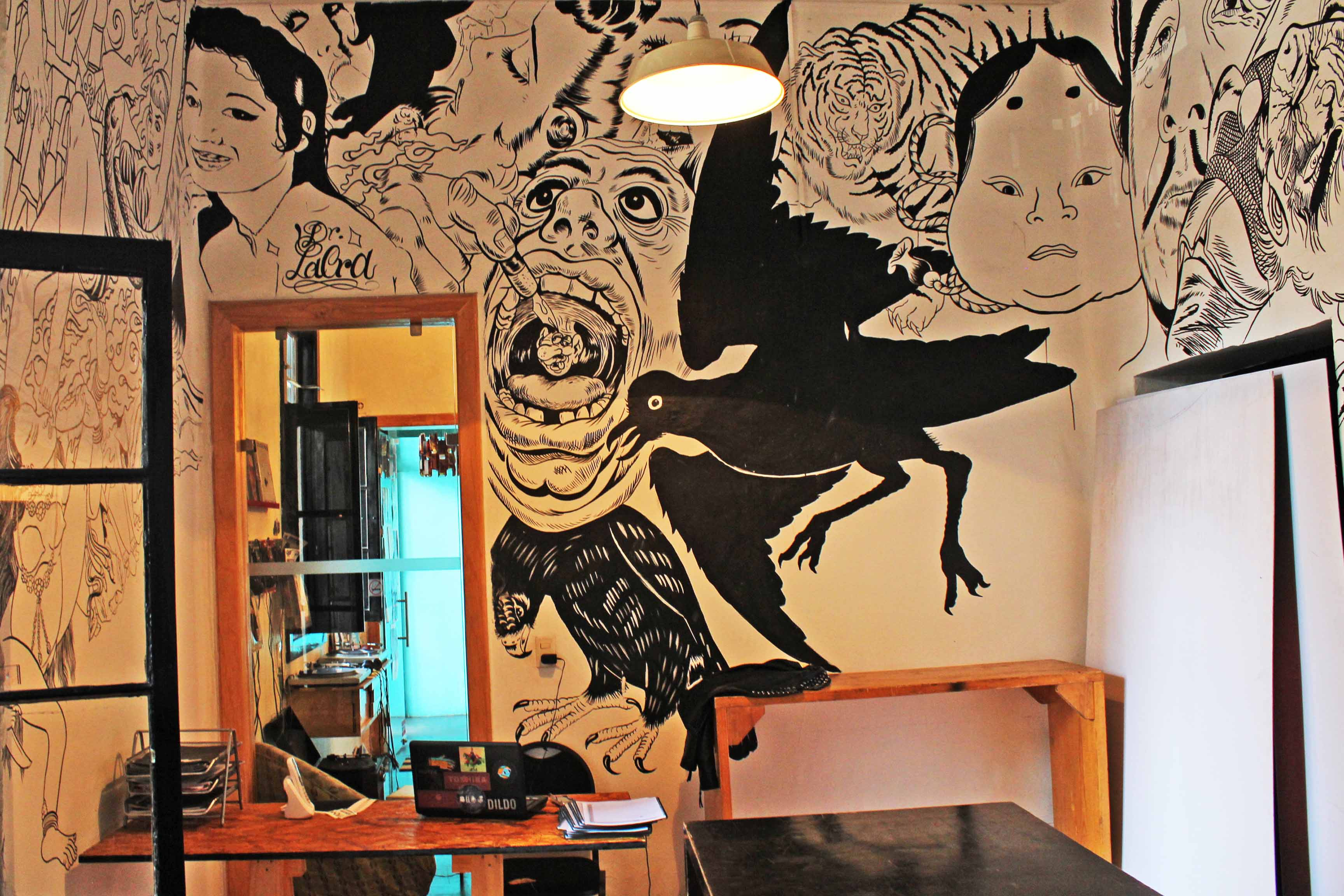
- Interior of the Center
- Established: 2007
- Location: Mexico
- Coordinates: 19°25′0.54″N 99°9′22.89″W
- Type: Cultural
- Visitors: 7200 (2010)
- Director: Eugenio Echeverría
- Public transit access: Metro Hospital General
- Website: http://border.com.mx

The Centro Cultural Border, or Border Cultural Center, is an independent cultural space in Colonia Roma that encourages the production, formation and awareness of emerging contemporary art with a focus on visual art, multimedia and graffiti. The center has a cafeteria, library, book store and a series of workshops focused on urban art. The library has materials in English and Spanish about illustration, graffiti, design and contemporary art.

== Origins and history ==
The Centro Cultural Border opened in 2007 after a year of planning by its founders Eugenio Echeverría, Virginie Vincent, Arturo Delgado and Mónica Ashida. The idea for the center, according to an interview with Echeverría, emerged from two conversations over mezcal in which the founders, recognizing the growth of graffiti and urban art, wanted to “make the ephemeral last more than one day, documenting its passing through time.”

It was originally located in Orizaba Street #203.

== Interventions, workshops and expositions ==
In addition to organizing expositions and workshops, the center promotes interventions focused on urban art and graffiti. In 2007 the center co-produced, along with the DSR collective, “Máscaras” (Masks), a graffiti exposition mounted on a trolley bus located on Guadalajara Street at the corner of Veracruz in the Condesa Neighborhood.

The center has shown work by several artists such as Zombra, Amor Muñoz, Adriana Riquer, Gabriela Rodríguez, Marco Arce, Luis Hurtado, Andrea M. Medina, Roni Horn, Ciler, Gustavo Abascal, Vena2, Carlos Olvera, José Luís Rojas, Andrea Sicsik, Juan José Rivas, Rafael Uriegas, Helena Fernández- Cavada, Fernando Moreno, Saner, Martín Núñez, Apolo Arauz, Dulce Chacón, Rita Pone de León, Antonio Domínguez, Ferrous, Jesus Benítez, José Luís Rojas, Saner, Máximo González, Fernando Pizarro, Tres, Antonio Ibarra, Fabián Peña, Dea Arjona, Orlando Díaz, Iván Abreu, Arcángel Constantini, Yurián Zerón, Juan Pablo Villegas, Santiago Itzcoatl, Martín Núñez, Mora Diez, Saner, Jimena Rincón, Jose Alfredo Jiménez, Leo Marz, Jazael Olguín, Rodrigo Hernández, Georgina Bringas, Ben Denham, Iván Edeza, Francesco Jodice, Carlos Irigoyen, Enrique Jezik, Jorge Ortega del Campo, Antonio Rendón, Gabriel Santamarina, Christian Maciá, Cynthia Gutierrez, Fernando Palomar, Luis Rodrigo, Javier M Rodríguez, Verónica Flores, Susana Rodríguez, Daniel Monroy, Jimena Rincón Perez-Sandi, Carlos Aranda, Andrés Jurado, Renato Garza, Omar González, Pablo Helguera, Arturo Hernández, Noé Martínez, Miguel Monroy, Carlos Olvera, Hugo Ramírez aka “Blogke Negro”, Joaquín Segura, Artemio, Amanda García Martín, Florencia Guillen, Fernando Paloma, Verónica Cardoso and Neuzz.

It has offered workshops including, “Lo posible en las ideas: asesoría de proyectos” (The possible in the ideas: project consultancy) by Iván Abreu, “Curaduría” (Curatorial) by Bárbara Perea, “Crítica de arte” (Art Criticism) by Octavio Avendaño, “Arte y nuevos medios” (Art and new media) by Edith Medina, “Processing” by Leonardo Aranda, “DIseño y producción de tatuajes” (Tattoo design and production) by Erick Nava, and “Creación de música electrónica” (Creation of electronic music) by Bishop.

== Gallery ==
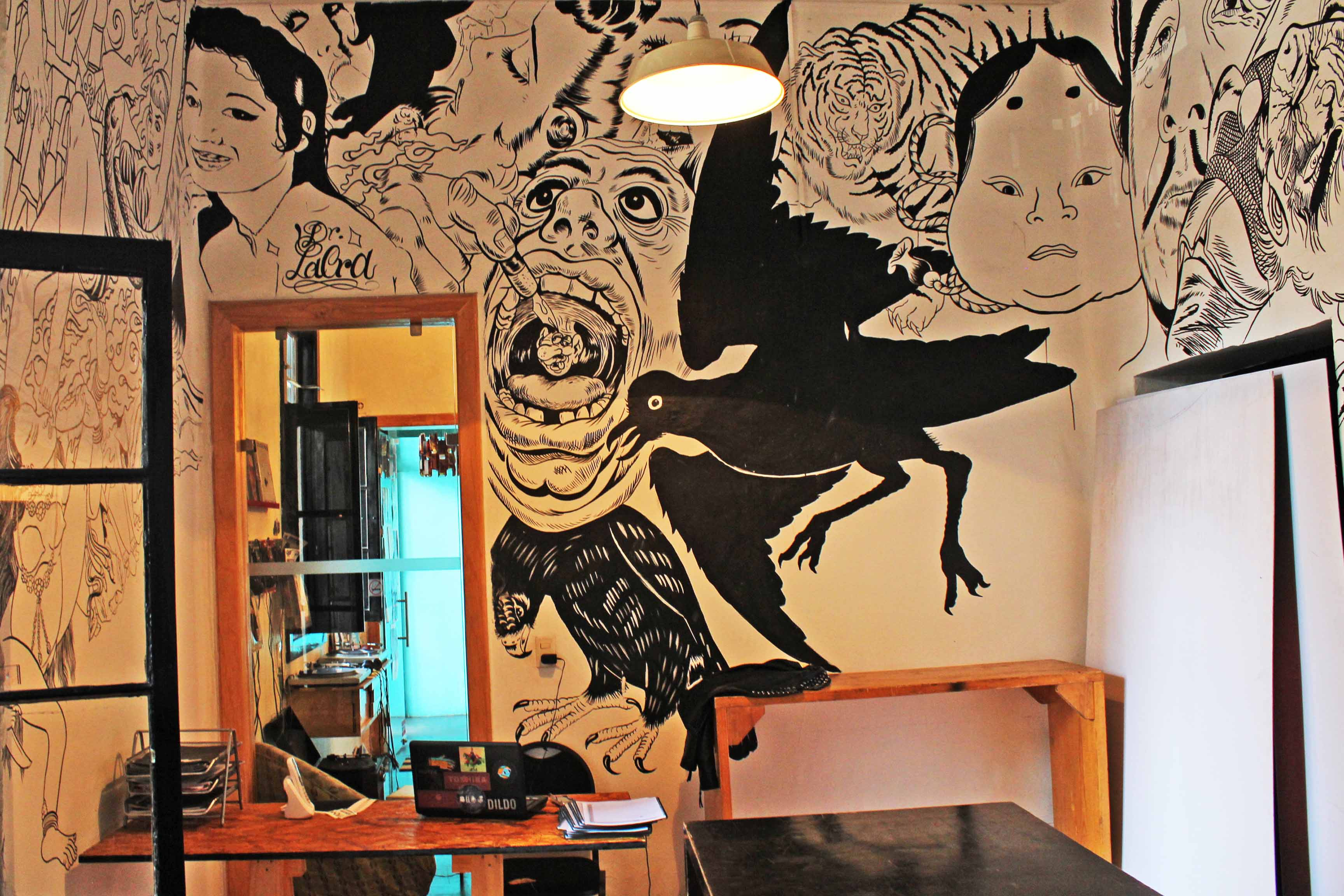
Interior

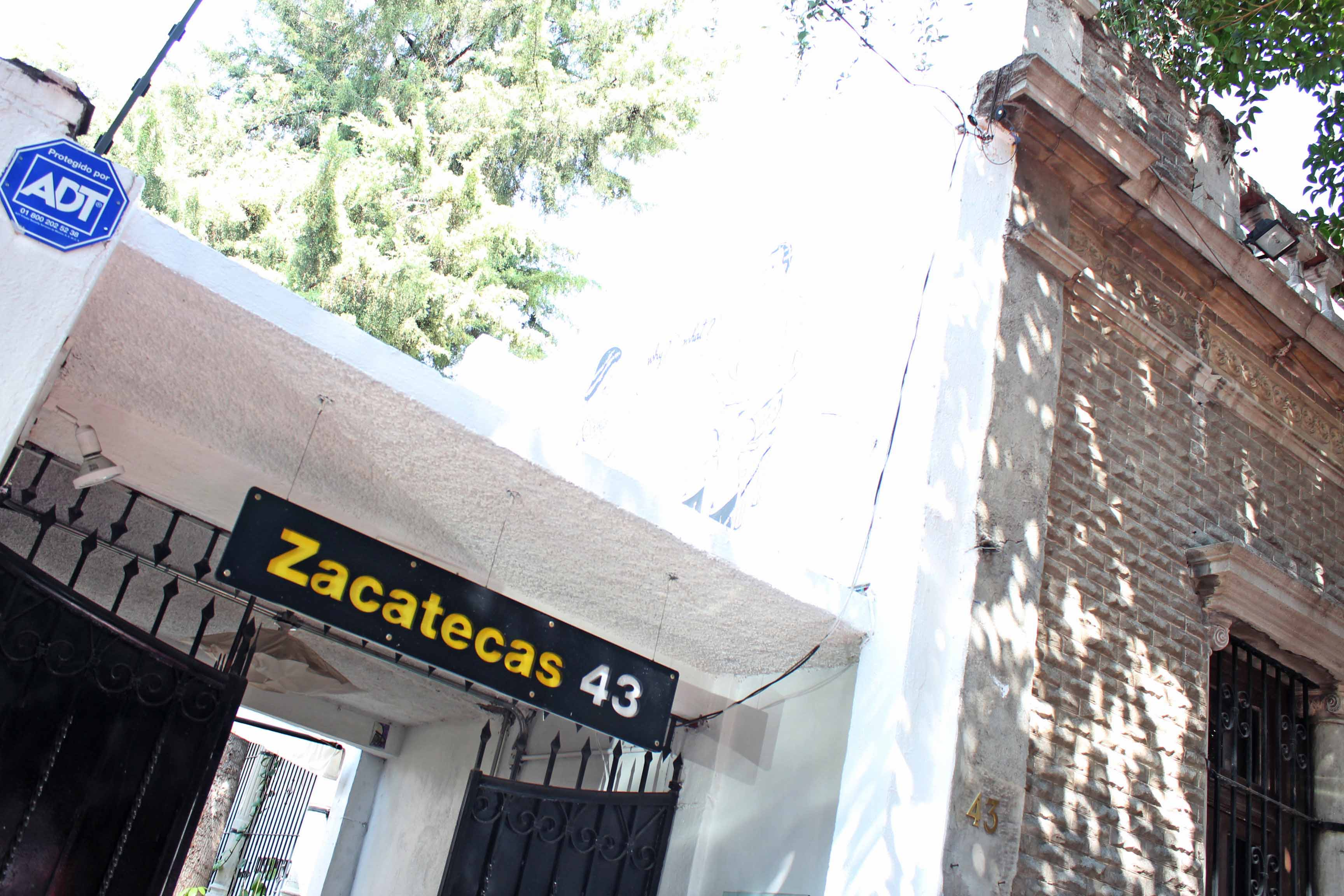
Entrance

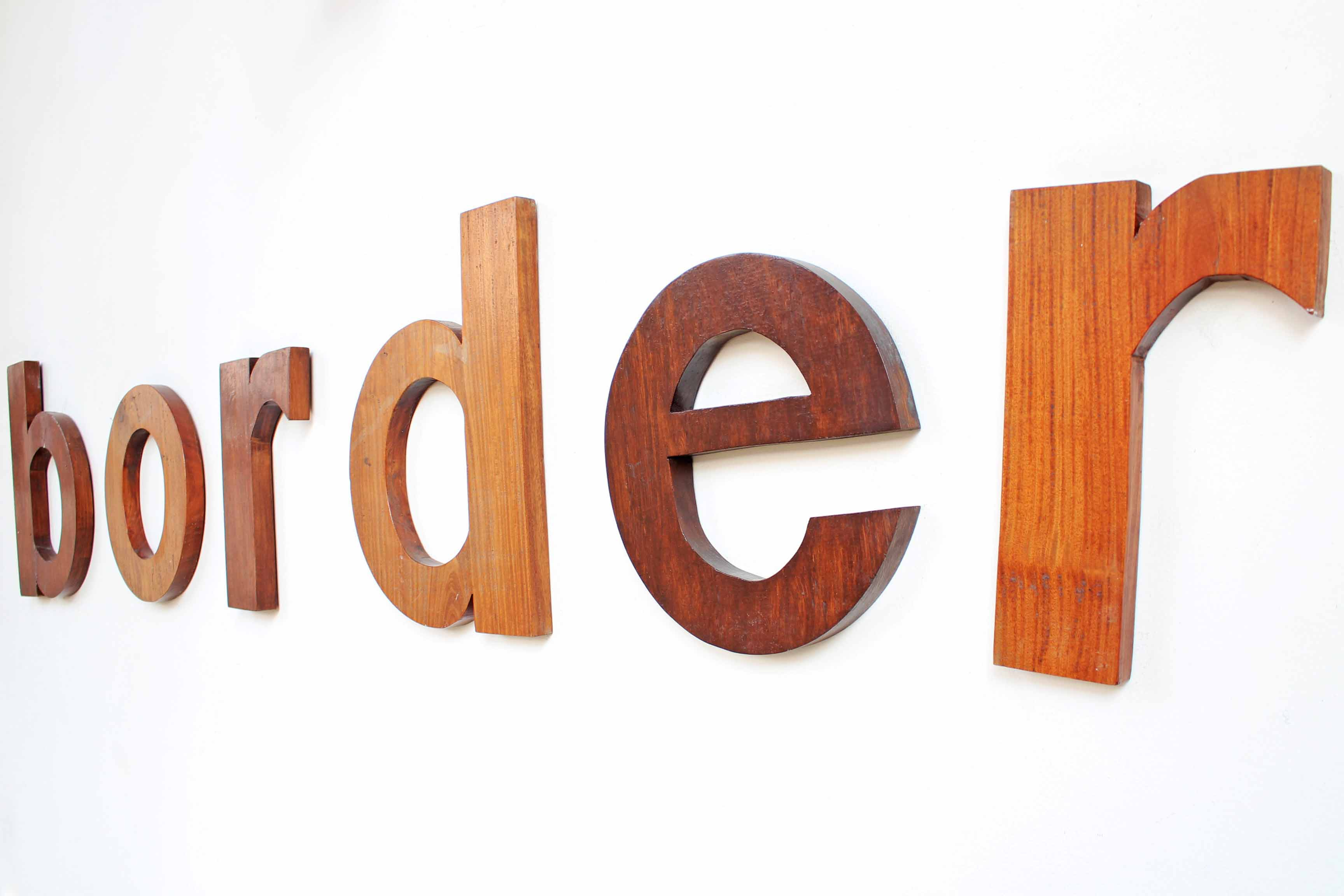
Sign
