= Quentin Bajac =

French museum curator (born 1965)

- Born: 1965 (age 60–61); Paris, France
- Education: École du Louvre
- Occupations: Curator, historian of photography
- Employer(s): École du Louvre, Museum of Modern Art, Galerie nationale du Jeu de Paume

Quentin Bajac (born 1965) is a French museum curator and art historian specialising in the history of photography. He is currently the director of the Galerie nationale du Jeu de Paume (National Gallery of the Real Tennis Court) in Paris.

Bajac has held positions at the Musée d'Orsay (1995–2003), Centre Georges Pompidou (2003–2010), Musée National d'Art Moderne and École du Louvre (2010–2013) and Museum of Modern Art (MoMA) (2013–2018).

He has published a number of works on photography, most notably the three-volume series—La photographie—on the history of photography (2000–2010), which belongs to the collection Découvertes Gallimard, as well as Parr by Parr: Discussions with a Promiscuous Photographer (2011), Stephen Shore: Solving Pictures (2017), Being Modern: MoMA in Paris (co-author with Olivier Michelon, 2017).

In 2013 Bajac was made a Chevalier (Knight) of the Ordre des Arts et des Lettres.

== Career ==
After gaining a diploma of the Institut national du patrimoine, Bajac was appointed Curator of Photography at the Musée d'Orsay in 1995 before joining the Centre Georges Pompidou in 2003, where he has been an associate curator in the Photography Department. In 2010, he was appointed Head of the Cabinet de la Photographie at the Musée National d'Art Moderne, and a professor at the École du Louvre. In January 2013, he was appointed The Joel and Anne Ehrenkranz Chief Curator of Photography at the Museum of Modern Art (MoMA) in New York City. Bajac remained in that post at MoMA until becoming director of the Galerie nationale du Jeu de Paume in Paris in November 2018.

Bajac has curated various exhibitions on 19th-century and contemporary photography, in particular, he organised En collaboration avec le Soleil, Victor Hugo, photographies de l'exil (1998), Tableaux vivants : Fantaisies photographiques victoriennes (1999), La Commune photographiée (2000), Dans le champ des étoiles : Les photographes et le ciel, 1850-2000 (2000), Le Daguerréotype français : Un objet photographique (2003), William Klein (2005), La Subversion des images : Surréalisme, photographie, film (2009), and Voici Paris : Modernités photographiques, 1920–1950 — La collection Christian Bouqueret (2012). As the chief curator of photography at MoMA, he organised A World of Its Own: Photographic Practices in the Studio (2014), Scenes for a New Heritage: Contemporary Art from the Collection (2015), and Stephen Shore (2018).

== Honours ==
- Chevalier (Knight) of the Ordre des Arts et des Lettres (2013)

== La photographie series ==
- L'image révélée : L'invention de la photographie, coll. « Découvertes Gallimard » (nº 414), série Arts. Paris: Gallimard, 2001 ISBN 2-070-76167-3
  - US edition – The Invention of Photography, "Abrams Discoveries" series. New York: Harry N. Abrams, 2002 ISBN 9780810928275
  - UK edition – The Invention of Photography: The First Fifty Years, ‘New Horizons’ series. London: Thames & Hudson, 2002 ISBN 9780500301111
- La photographie : L'époque moderne 1880-1960, coll. « Découvertes Gallimard » (nº 473), série Arts. Paris: Gallimard, 2005 ISBN 978-2-070-30069-3
- Après la photographie ? : De l'argentique à la révolution numérique, coll. « Découvertes Gallimard » (nº 559), série Arts. Paris: Gallimard, 2010 ISBN 9782070358168

== Publications ==
- L'ABCdaire du Musée d'Orsay, Flammarion, 1999 ISBN 978-2080124777
- Tableaux vivants. Fantaisies photographiques victoriennes, 1840-1880, Réunion des Musées Nationaux, 1999 ISBN 978-2711838660
- With Alain Sayag & Martine d'Astier, Lartigue : l'album d'une vie, 1894-1986, 2003
- With Christian Caujolle, The Abrams Encyclopedia of Photography, Harry N. Abrams, 2004
- With Clément Chéroux, Collection photographies : une histoire de la photographie à travers les collections du Centre Pompidou, Musée national d'art moderne, coédition Centre Pompidou/Steidl, 2007 ISBN 978-2-84426-348-3
- With C. Chéroux, La subversion des images : surréalisme, photographie, film, Éd. du Centre Pompidou, 2009 ISBN 978-2-84426-390-2
- Le corps en éclats, Éd. du Centre Pompidou, 2009 ISBN 978-2844265432
- Miroslav Tichy, Éd. du Centre Pompidou, 2009 ISBN 978-2844263643
- La photographie, du daguerréotype au numérique, coll. « Découvertes Gallimard Hors série ». Paris: Gallimard, 2010 ISBN 978-2-070-13066-5
- Clément Chéroux ed., with Man Ray, Man Ray : Portraits : Paris - Hollywood - Paris, Éd. du Centre Pompidou, 2010 ISBN 978-2844264824
  - Man Ray: Portraits : Paris, Hollywood, Paris : from the Man Ray Archives of the Centre Pompidou, Prestel Pub, 2011
- With Martin Parr, Le mélange des genres, Textuel, 2010 ISBN 978-2845973916
- Parr by Parr: Quentin Bajac Meets Martin Parr : Discussions with a Promiscuous Photographer, Schilt, 2010
- Mimmo Jodice. Les Yeux du Louvre, Paris/Arles, coéd. Musée du Louvre/Actes Sud, 2011 ISBN 978-2-7427-9867-4
- With Sylvie Aubenas, Brassaï, le flaneur nocturne, Gallimard, 2012 ISBN 978-2070121014
- Robert Doisneau : « Pêcheur d'images », coll. « Découvertes Gallimard » (nº 581), série Arts. Paris: Gallimard, 2012 ISBN 9782070445813
- With Olivier Michelon, Being Modern: MoMA in Paris, Thames & Hudson, 2017
- Stephen Shore: Solving Pictures, Thames & Hudson, 2017
