= Pere Formiguera =

Spanish photographer

Pere Formiguera (born Barcelona, 1952 – died May 9, 2013) was a Spanish photographer and writer.

== Biography ==
Between 1971 and 1977 he studied art history at the Autonomous University of Barcelona, although he focused on photography. He began taking photographs in 1969, but it was not until 1973 that he had his first exhibition Homenatge a François Arago, with Lluís Milán, in the Exhibition Hall of the Rubí Library. He was a founding member of the now-defunct Alabern group. He has also been a curator of various exhibitions and an advisory member of the Joan Miró Foundation and the National Museum of Art of Catalonia.

At the beginning of his career he carried out various works with Joan Fontcuberta, including various exhibitions and later in 1983 the book Fauna secreta. In addition, he was curator of others such as Porta d'Aigua (1989), Josep Esquirol, Ricard Terré (1995) or Introduction to Photography in Catalonia (2000). In 1975 he was among the authors who regularly contributed to the magazine Nueva Lente during its second term. At that time he was already opposed to the classification of his work within strict photographic limits, claiming his artistic and experimental function, as well as the creative nature of the photographer.

In 1994 he won the award for best children's book of the year, awarded by the Ministry of Culture, thanks to the illustrations of the children's book. In 1997 he obtained the Innovation prize at the Bologna International Fair for his book of photographs It's called body . In 2010 he was awarded the Sant Cugat Prize for his artistic career.

His photographic works have been exhibited at various museums such as the MOMA in New York, the MNCARS in Madrid or the Barcelona MNAC, MACBA and CCCB .
