= Yevtushenko =

Yevtushenko or Evtushenko (Ukrainian: Євтушенко, Russian: Евтушенко) is a gender-neutral Ukrainian surname that originates from the Greek given name Eutychius. It may refer to:

- Alexander Evtushenko (born 1993), Russian racing cyclist
- Anatoly Yevtushenko (1934–2026), Soviet handball player and coach
- Sasha Yevtushenko (born 1979), director and producer for BBC Radio, son of Yevgeny
- Vadym Yevtushenko (born 1958), Ukrainian former footballer
- Vladislava Evtushenko (born 1996), Russian actress, dancer, model, and beauty pageant titleholder
- Yevgeny Yevtushenko (1933–2017), Soviet and Russian poet

== See also ==
- Vladimir Yevtushenkov (born 1948), Russian tycoon
