= Jonathan Lewis (artist) =

Jonathan Lewis (born 1970, London) lives and works in New Jersey, USA. He makes photo-based art that explores themes of visual memory and modern communication via the elemental properties of the pixel and the low-fi aesthetic of the screen-grab. His subjects, ranging from candy wrappers and emojis to haute couture and works of art reflect an uncritical fascination for the artificial and the man-made. His process, often pixelating images beyond recognition, criss crosses the border between figuration and abstraction, and his work takes the form of digital prints, sculpture, video, books, and painting. He is a founding member of the ABC Artists' Books Cooperative.

Exhibition highlights include 'Signs of a Struggle: Photography in the Wake of Postmodernism' at the Victoria & Albert Museum, London, UK in 2011, and a two-person show, 'Mosaico', with the American photographer John Pfahl at Nina Freudenheim Gallery, Buffalo, USA in 2012. Other museum shows include 'Sight Reading: Photography and the Legible World' (2016) at the Morgan Library & Museum, New York, which presented his Pixles series based on Beatles album covers, and 'Fiction and Fabrication: Photography of Architecture after the Digital Turn' (2019) at MAAT, Lisbon, Portugal, which showed pictures from his Designer Labels series.

Lewis's work is held in a number of public collections including the Museum of Modern Art, New York, USA; Victoria and Albert Museum, London, UK; Société Française de Photographie, Paris, France; Novo Banco Collection of Contemporary Photography, Lisbon, Portugal; Cleveland Museum of Art, Cleveland, OH; George Eastman House International Museum of Photography and Film, Rochester, New York, USA.

== Publications ==
- David Evans,, Wasting Time on the Internet, Elephant Magazine, February 6, 2018
- Robert Shore, , The art of the steal: When does a copyright go too far?, CNN Style, November 23, 2017
- Tom Sowden, Ruscha Rip-Off, Rip-Out, Afterimage, Vol 37 No 6, Rochester, USA, 2010.
- Steven Ceuppens, Space Invaders, Extra Magazine Fotomuseum Antwerp, Netherlands, Summer 2008.
- Caroline Cunningham, Cracking The Bar Code, House and Garden, USA, March 2004.
- Kim Zorn Caputo, , Blind Spot Magazine, Issue 18, New York, USA, 2001.
