= Miroslav Tichý =

Czech photographer (1926–2011)

- Born: November 20, 1926; Kyjov, Czechoslovakia
- Died: April 12, 2011 (aged 84); Kyjov, Czech Republic
- Occupation: Photographer

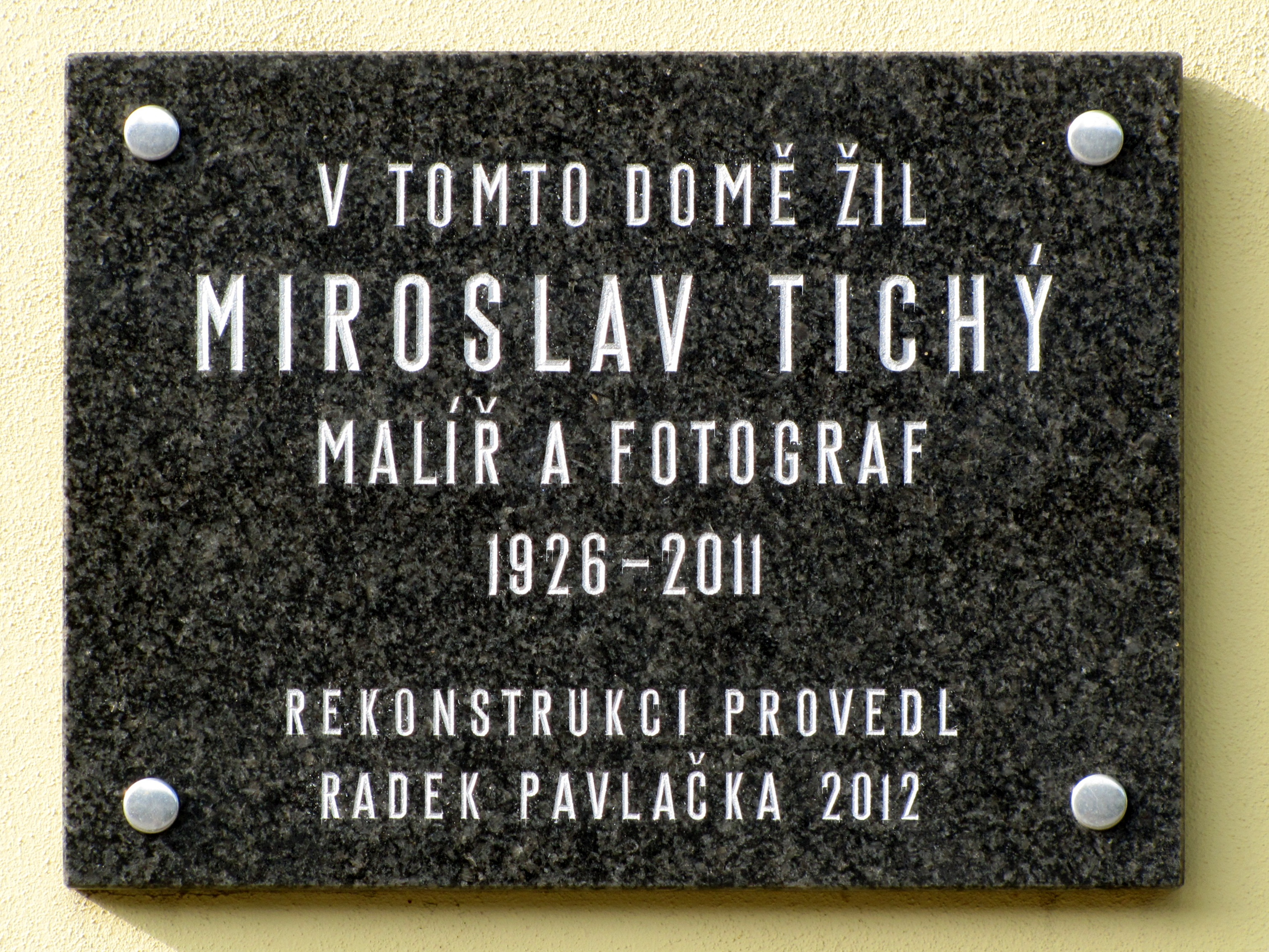

Miroslav Tichý (Czech pronunciation: [ˈmɪroslaf ˈcɪxiː]; November 20, 1926 – April 12, 2011) was a photographer who from the 1960s until 1985 took thousands of surreptitious pictures of women in his hometown of Kyjov in the Czech Republic, using homemade cameras constructed of cardboard tubes, tin cans and other at-hand materials. Most of his subjects were unaware that they were being photographed. A few struck beauty-pageant poses when they sighted Tichý, perhaps not realizing that the parody of a camera he carried was real.

His soft focus, fleeting glimpses of the women of Kyjov are skewed, spotted and loosely printed — flawed by the limitations of his primitive equipment and a series of deliberate processing mistakes meant to add poetic imperfections.

Of his technical methods, Tichy has said, "First of all, you have to have a bad camera", and, "If you want to be famous, you must do something more badly than anybody in the entire world."

During the Communist regime in Czechoslovakia, Tichý was considered a dissident and was badly treated by the government. His photographs remained largely unknown until an exhibition was held for him in 2004. Tichý did not attend exhibitions, and lived a life of self-sufficiency and freedom from the standards of society.

Tichý died on April 12, 2011, in Kyjov, Czech Republic.

== Early life ==
Miroslav Tichý was born in 1926 in the village of Nětčice, part of the town of Kyjov (now South Moravian Region), Czechoslovakia. He was an introverted child who did well in school.

Although Tichý is regarded today as an outsider artist because of his unconventional approach to photography, he studied at the Academy of Fine Arts in Prague, and for a time seemed on the path to becoming an esteemed painter in the modernist mode, working in a style reminiscent of Josef Čapek. After the Communist takeover of Czechoslovakia in 1948, students at the Academy were required to work in the Socialist mode, drawing workers in overalls rather than female models. Tichý refused, stopped working and quit the Academy. He was then required to perform his compulsory military service.

When he returned to Kyjov, he lived with his parents on a small disability pension, and painted and drew for himself in his own style. The Communist regime in its paranoia saw the independent Tichý as a dissident, kept him under surveillance and tried to "normalize" him, bringing him to the State psychiatric clinic for a few days on Communist patriotic holidays such as May Day to keep him out of the public eye. In the 1960s he began to disregard his personal appearance, wearing a ragged suit and letting his unkempt hair and beard grow long. At about this time he began to wander around town with an intentionally imperfect homemade camera, taking clandestine photographs of local women.

In 1972, Tichý was evicted from his studio, his work thrown into the street. He stopped drawing and painting and concentrated only on photography, working in the disorderly conditions of his home. Of the transition, he says, "The paintings were already painted, the drawings drawn. What was I supposed to do? I looked for new media. With the help of photography I saw everything in a new light. It was a new world."

In 1985, Tichý stopped making his photographs and again concentrated on drawing. His non-photographic body of work includes 100 to 200 oil paintings and a vast number of drawings. As with his photographs, in the past he destroyed an unknown number of such works.

== Approach to photography ==
During the years he wandered through Kyjov taking photographs with his crude cameras, the tall, shabby Tichý was tolerated by the townspeople but regarded as an eccentric. He shot about 90 pictures a day, returning to his disordered home to develop and print them.

Homemade telephoto lenses allowed him to work unnoticed at a distance from his subjects. He frequented the streets, the bus station, the main square, the park across from the town swimming pool, stealing intimate glimpses of the women of Kyjov. Although he was not permitted to go to the pool, he could photograph undisturbed through the wire fence. The fence often appears in his pictures, its presence adding a suggestion of forbidden fruit.

According to a review by R. Wayne Parsons published in The New York Photo Review,

We see women photographed from the rear, from the front, from the side; we see their feet, legs, buttocks, backs, faces, as well as complete bodies [as when drawing a nude at the Academy]; we see them walking, standing, sitting, bending over, reclining. There are a few nudes, though the poor image quality sometimes makes it difficult to determine if we are looking at a nude or a woman with not much on. [...] Whatever eroticism is present is limited to that of the voyeur; these women are not inviting us into their world.

Tichý's pictures were created for his own viewing pleasure, not for sale or exhibition. Each negative was printed only once.

== Artistic aspects ==
Tichý's subtle photographs use themes of movement, composition and contrast, but the main theme is an obsession with the female body. Technically, his pictures are full of mistakes that compound the built-in limitations of his equipment — underexposed or overexposed, out of focus, blemished by dust in the camera, stained by careless darkroom processing. Tichý explains, "A mistake. That's what makes the poetry."

== Equipment ==
Tichý made his equipment from materials at hand. A typical camera might be constructed from plywood, sealed from the light with road asphalt, with a plywood shutter with a window cut through, operated by a pulley system of thread spools and dressmaker's elastic.

A homemade telephoto lens might be constructed from cardboard tubes or plastic pipes. He made his own lenses, cutting them out of Plexiglas, sanding them with sandpaper, then polishing with a mix of toothpaste and cigarette ashes. His enlarger combines sheet metal, two fence slats, a light bulb and a tin can.

== Printing and mounting ==
Once a picture was printed, Tichý might scissor off unwanted parts to improve the composition. Particularly successful images were pasted onto cardboard, or backed with other paper to prevent curling. He often drew lines with a pen or pencil to reinforce the subject's contours, or to heighten an image's expressiveness. He might decorate the margins with hand-drawn designs.

== Conservation ==
The works were unnumbered, untitled and undated. Tichý kept no catalogue and had no room to properly store his negatives or prints. Once he had printed a picture, it was cast aside, dropped haphazardly about his home, exposed to dirt and damage, rats and insects.

In 1981, Roman Buxbaum, a former neighbor befriended by Tichý when Buxbaum was a child, returned from exile in Switzerland. His family had long been owners of paintings and drawings by Tichý, and now Buxbaum discovered the photographic work, which had been kept a secret.

Buxbaum began an effort to collect and preserve the artist's deteriorating photographs. He says that over the next 25 years it was his good fortune to be the only person to see, collect and document Tichý's work. Tichý made him presents of bundles of photographs, and Buxbaum bought more bundles from Tichý's neighbor and "surrogate mother", Jana Hebnarová, who looked after Tichý since his mother's death and was appointed his heir. In 2006, Buxbaum said that he believed his to be the most complete collection of Tichý's photographs, and that he had placed part of it with galleries for sale on commission, with the intention of making it available to museums and collectors to "bequeath it to the world of art".

In 2009, it was announced that Tichý had severed all ties with Buxbaum and the Tichý Oceán Foundation's website. In a notarized statement dated 22 January 2009, Tichý states that he made no agreement, written or oral, with Buxbaum to propagate his works, that Buxbaum exploits his works without authorization and violates his copyright, and that only he, Hebnarová and his lawyer have the right to decide on the use and propagation of his works.

== Recognition ==
As part of Buxbaum's conservation efforts, he made a documentary about the artist's work and life, Miroslav Tichý: Tarzan Retired (2004). Tichý's work was largely unknown until Buxbaum's collection of his photographs was shown at the 2004 Biennial of Contemporary Art in Seville. Tichý's work won the Rencontres d'Arles 2005 New Discovery Award, and Buxbaum set up the Tichý Oceán Foundation on behalf of Tichý, then 77, to preserve and exhibit his work. In 2005, he had a major retrospective at the Kunsthaus in Zurich, another at the Pompidou Centre in 2008.

In February 2010, Tichý had a solo show at the International Center of Photography in New York City. The exhibition featured 100 photographs, the film "Miroslav Tichý: Tarzan Retired," and two large vitrines exhibiting dusty and grimy piles of photographs, homemade cameras, lamps, and rolls of undeveloped film. In its review, The New York Times thought his anti-modernist style was representative of the nonviolent subversion practiced by Czech students and artists under the Soviet regime, and called his photographs an "uncanny fusion of eroticism, paranoia and deliberation" that is "mildly disturbing [but also] intensely fascinating".

== Critical interpretation ==
An essay in Artforum International describes Tichý as "practically reinventing photography from scratch", rehabilitating the soft focus, manipulated pictorial photography of the late 1800s,

...not as a distortion of the medium but as something like its essence. What counts for him is not only the image – just one moment in the photographic process – but also the chemical activity of the materials, which is never entirely stable or complete, and the delimitation of the results via cropping and framing.

Director Radek Horacek of the Brno House of Art, which held an exhibition of Tichy's photographs in 2006, describes them thus:

They are all very careful observations of women from Kyjov and of everyday trivial activities. But soon you realize that these trivial situations such as someone sitting on a bench, women waiting for a bus, someone taking a T-shirt off at a swimming pool, are somehow extraordinary. Tichy managed to give this banality a feeling of exceptionality and rarity. Just part of a female body in his pictures can look very esoteric. There are so many magazines that offer much more nudity than Tichy but his photographs are different. A woman's tights between a knee and a skirt or a swimming costume in his pictures look somehow mysterious.

== Selected solo shows ==
- 2019: "A Figure Drawn" Robert Heald Gallery, Wellington, New Zealand
- 2017: "Photographs 1960–1990" Robert Heald Gallery, Wellington, New Zealand
- 2013: “City of the Women”, Zephyr, Mannheim, Germany
- 2013: “Homage to Miroslav Tichý”, Prague Biennale, Prague, Czech Republic
- 2012: "L'Homme à la Mauvaise Caméra", Pascal Polar Gallery, Brussels, Belgium
- 2012: "The Artist with the Bad Camera", Moscow House of Photography, Moscow, Russia
- 2011: "Sun Screen", Horton Gallery, New York City, United States
- 2011: "Miroslav Tichỷ, Retrospettiva", SI Fest, Savignano sul Rubicone, Italy
- 2011: "Miroslav Tichỷ", Braunschweig University of Art, Braunschweig, Germany
- 2011: "Miroslav Tichỷ", Wilkinson Gallery, London, Great Britain
- 2011: "Les formes du vrai / Forms of Truth", City Gallery Prague, Prague, Czech Republic
- 2010: "Miroslav Tichỷ", International Centre of Photography, New York City, United States
- 2009: "Miroslav Tichỷ. Mirography", Ivorypress Art Space, Madrid, Spain
- 2008: "Miroslav Tichỷ", Centre Georges Pompidou, Musée national d’Art Moderne, Paris, France
- 2008: "Miroslav Tichỷ", Kunsthaus Bregenz, KUB Billboards, Bregenz, Austria
- 2008: "Miroslav Tichỷ", Museum of Modern Art (MMK), Frankfurt, Germany
- 2007: "Miroslav Tichỷ", Taka Ishii Gallery, Tokyo, Japan
- 2007: "Miroslav Tichỷ", Beijing Art Now Gallery, Beijing, China
- 2007: "Miroslav Tichỷ", Beijing Art Now Gallery, Shanghai, China
- 2006: "Miroslav Tichỷ", Brno House of Art, Brno, Czech Republic
- 2005: "Miroslav Tichỷ", Kunsthaus, Zurich, Switzerland

== Bibliography ==
- Pascal Polar (ed.), Miroslav Tichý: L'Homme à la Mauvaise Caméra. Artvox éditions & Éditions Jannink, 2012, ISBN 978-2-916067-65-0
- Gianfranco Sanguinetti (ed.), Miroslav Tichý: Les formes du vrai / Forms of Truth. KANT Publishers, 2011, ISBN 978-80-7437-039-7
- Brian Wallis (International Center of Photography, N.Y.C.) (ed.). Miroslav Tichý. Steidl, 2010, ISBN 978-3-86930-102-0
- Roman Buxbaum (ed.). Miroslav Tichý. Cologne: Verlag der Buchhandlung Walther König Buchverlag, 2008, ISBN 978-2-84426-364-3
- Quentin Bajac, (ed.). Miroslav Tichý, Paris: Editions du Centre Georges Pompidou, 2008, ISBN 978-2-84426-364-3
- Roman Buxbaum and Taka Ishii Gallery (eds.). Miroslav Tichý. Foundation Tichý Oceán, 2007, ISBN 978-39523332-0-4
- Douglas Hyde Gallery (ed.), Miroslav Tichý. Dublin: Exhibition Catalogue, 2008. ISBN 978-1-905397-16-7
- Roman Buxbaum and Pavel Vančát (eds.). Miroslav Tichý. Czech Republic: FotoTorst, 2006, ISBN 80-7215-277-7
- Roman Buxbaum, Miroslav Tichý. Foundation Tichý Oceán, 2006, ISBN 3-033-00813-5
- Tobia Bezzola and Roman Buxbaum(eds.). Miroslav Tichý. Cologne: DuMont Literatur und Kunst Verlag, 2005, ISBN 3-8321-7593-8
