= Rafael Uriegas =

Rafael Uriegas (born 1982 in Málaga, Spain) is a Spanish-born painter and muralist based in Mexico. His work spans easel painting and site-specific fresco, with recurring attention to landscape, color and biomorphic forms. In 2014, his painting Sombra received one of three acquisition awards at the XVI Bienal de Pintura Rufino Tamayo and entered the collection of the Museo de Arte Contemporáneo de Oaxaca (MACO).

== Education and early career ==
Uriegas studied at the Escuela Nacional de Pintura, Escultura y Grabado “La Esmeralda” in Mexico City. He was included in the Fondo Nacional para la Cultura y las Artes's (FONCA) 2013/2014 generation of Jóvenes Creadores. A 2014 profile in Chilango described his early practice as centered on landscape, drawing on modern and classical pictorial traditions while moving toward abstraction through depictions of Mexican coasts and vegetation.

== Career ==
In 2014, Uriegas won an acquisition award at the XVI Bienal de Pintura Rufino Tamayo for Sombra, an acrylic painting. The prize jurors were artists Brian Nissen, Magali Lara and Manuel Marín. The official Bienal announcement stated that the three awarded works, including Sombra, would enter the MACO collection.

Following the award, RSVP published a profile of Uriegas in 2015 in connection with his exhibition Laguna at Galería Karen Huber in Mexico City. The profile discussed his landscape-based painting and quoted juror Magali Lara describing his interest in color, landscape and a dialogue with contemporary art. That year, he was also among the artists included in Después del Edén. Arte en Cuernavaca, 1974-2014 at La Tallera, an exhibition organized to survey four decades of artistic production connected with Cuernavaca.

In 2017, the Museo de Arte de Sonora (MUSAS) presented fifteen paintings by Uriegas. El Imparcial reported that museum director Rubén Matiella Villaescusa highlighted the artist's handling of color and his exhibition trajectory. In the same year, Artnet News included his solo exhibition, Cueva Semilla Sol at Galería Karen Huber in its Mexico City art guide.

Uriegas was also included in México: Pintura reactiva at the Museo de Arte Carrillo Gil in 2018, an exhibition organized around contemporary approaches to painting and the pictorial image.

In 2024, Uriegas presented Ocaso Tropical at Galería de Arte Mexicano in Mexico City. Writing in Arquine, curator Liana Vázquez described the exhibition through its saturated color, tropical-landscape associations and the way the paintings and sculptures shaped the viewer's experience of the gallery space. The exhibition was also situated within a broader discussion of contemporary painting in Mexico by critic Daniel Montero in Cubo Blanco.

== Murals and fresco practice ==
Alongside his canvas work, Uriegas has developed a practice in mural painting and fresco. In 2021, Excélsior documented Los cantantes, a fresco for the Museo Histórico y Etnográfico de Caborca in Sonora. The report described the work as referring to the forms, life and landscape of the Sonoran desert and noted the participation of Matías Valenzuela, a member of the Tohono O’odham community.

A 2024 profile in Arquitectura y Diseño by Isabel Mar galejo traced Uriegas's fresco practice to 2013 and described his mural work as a collaborative process shaped by dialogue with architects, clients and specific spaces. The profile also noted commissions at the Royal Mansour in Casablanca and Izel restaurant in London.

Uriegas's extensive fresco intervention at Pug Seal Zapoteco in Oaxaca later received international design and interiors coverage. The August 2024 issue of The World of Interiors used one of Uriegas's Pug Seal Zapoteco frescoes on its cover and devoted “Bright Jung Thing,” an eight-page feature by curator Enrique Giner de los Ríos, to the artist and the project. The article discussed the hotel as a large-scale canvas incorporating references to Zapotec mythology, Mediterranean imagery and recurring symbolic forms.

In 2026, AD France devoted a section of a feature on contemporary mural painting to Uriegas, illustrating his frescoes at Pug Seal Zapoteco and discussing his relationship to Mexican muralism, Mexican Baroque and mural commissions in several cities. Architectural Digest also documented a commissioned mural by Uriegas in a New York residence in 2026.

== Artistic practice and reception ==
Critical writing about Uriegas includes recurring discussions of landscape and color. Chilango described his treatment of jungles and beaches as moving away from conventional depiction toward colorful, baroque structures closer to contemporary abstraction. RSVP’s 2015 profile emphasized his engagement with landscape and color, while Vázquez’s 2024 review in Arquine, interpreted Ocaso Tropical through memory, tropical landscape and large fields of color.

Uriegas’s mural practice has been discussed in relation to the Mexican mural tradition and to architectural space. Journalist Aude de la Conté characterized the work as informed by Mexican muralism and Baroque references, while The World of Interiors’ August 2024 cover feature described his fresco practice as combining Mediterranean, Mexican and mythological references.

In a 2025 exhibition essay for Passing Through, curator Julieta Gonzalez situated Uriegas's practice in dialogue with Mexican muralism, the Generación de la Ruptura, Surrealism and abstraction. She emphasized color as a central expressive element and described his murals as an extension of painting beyond the flat canvas, contrasting their metaphysical and mythological orientation with the historical narratives associated with the major Mexican muralists.

== Awards, grants and collections ==
- 2014 - Acquisition Award, XVI Bienal de Pintura Rufino Tamayo, for Sombra.
- 2013/2014 - Jóvenes Creadores, FONCA.
- Museo de Arte Contemporáneo de Oaxaca (MACO) - Sombra entered the collection as an acquisition-award work.
- Museo de Arte de Sonora (MUSAS).
