= John Maclean (photographer) =

British photographer based in London

John Maclean is a British photographer based in London. He has been a freelance photographer since 1998, using commercial, architectural commissions to support an independent, fine-art practice. His work has appeared in books and periodicals and he has self-published seven photo-books that are held in the National Art Archive at The Victoria and Albert Museum and in private collections around the world.

"Two and Two" was exhibited at Flowers East in 2010 showing "two pictures made [from] the same scene and printed together".

"New Colour Guide" was published in 2012 and critically well received. Featuring on both the American Photo Magazine Best 2012 Photo list and Photo Eye's Best 2012 Best Books of 2012 list

His project Hometowns "undertook to visit the places that had shaped the visions of those artists who had influenced him and to depict them in a way that not just references"
