= Ivan Abreu =

Mexican visual artist

Iván Abreu at the presentation of his work "Hyperacusia" at Arte Abierto, Mexico City, 2023

Iván Abreu is an artist.

Abreu received his degree in informational design from the Superior Design Institute of La Habana and received his master's degree of engineering information technology from Anáhuac University.

His work is included in the collections of FEMSA; Patronato del Centro Histórico, Casa Vecina; Televisa and Museo Extremeño e Iberoamericano de Arte Contemporáneo.

He has been recognized by the Sistema Nacional de Creadores de Arte of FONCA (2012–2014, 2016–2019), National Center for the Arts (2007), Goethe Institute (2005), the Foundation for Contemporary Art (Torre de la Winds, 2003), National Union of Writers and Artists of Cuba (1991). He has been supported by ThePrix Ars Electronica (2012), the CINTAS Foundation Award in Visual Arts, and the Program for research in Arts and Media at the National Center for the Arts (2007). He is a beneficiary of the National System of Art Creators of the National Fund for Culture and the Arts of Mexico (2012-2014).

== Selected works ==
- Multiple vortex tornado (2013)
- The flip of the conductor (2012–13)
- Climate agent (2012)
- Cross Coordinates (Ciudad Juárez MX | El Paso US, 2010–2011)
- Segundo Aire (Second wind, 2010)
- Apnea (2010)
- High Tide (Pleamar, 2009)
- Final Abierto (Open Ending, 2009)
- 23.90mts (2009)
- Signal Mirrors (Espejos de señal, 2008)
- M(R.P.M.) Mass according to revolutions per minute (2007–2011)
