= Eutychius =

Eutychius or Eutychios (Greek: Εὐτύχιος, "fortunate") may refer to:

- Eutychius Proclus, 2nd-century grammarian
- Eutychius (exarch) (died 752), last Byzantine exarch of Ravenna
- Saint Eutychius, an early Christian martyr and companion of Placidus
- Saint Eutychius, an early Christian martyr and companion of Arcadius
- Eutychius of Constantinople (512–582), Patriarch of Constantinople and saint
- Eutychius of Alexandria (877–940), Greek Patriarch of Alexandria and historian
- Michael Astrapas and Eutychios (fl. ca. 1300), Greek painters

== See also ==
- Eutychus, /ˈjuːtɪkəs/ young man of Troas tended to by St. Paul
- Eutyches (380s–450s), presbyter and archimandrite at Constantinople
