= Elisabeth Tonnard =

Dutch artist and poet

Elisabeth Tonnard (1973) is a Dutch artist and poet working in artists' books, photography and literature.

== Biography ==
Tonnard was born in Leerdam and has a master's degree in literature from Radboud University Nijmegen (where she also taught), and an MFA in Visual Studies from Visual Studies Workshop in Rochester, New York.

She has published over forty books; these have been exhibited widely and are held in numerous private and public collections. Much of her work involves responding to existing books, texts and images, reworking them into new poetry, and creating photographic visual narratives. The works range in scale and method from a book that is completely invisible, to a book containing a short story that swallowed a novel, to a book that is a swimming pool. The work has won several awards, including the Kleine Hans award 2013. According to the report of the jury (Hans Samsom, Hans Eijkelboom, Hans Wolf, Hans van der Meer and Hans Aarsman), she is a "poet in the space between photographs."

Tonnard's book In this Dark Wood pairs ninety photographs from the Fox Movie Flash collection (held at the Visual Studies Workshop) of people walking at night with English translations of the opening stanza of Dante's Inferno:

Nel mezzo del cammin di nostra vita,

mi ritrovai per una selva oscura,

ché la diritta via era smarrita. (Note: In the translation by Allen Mandelbaum: "When I had journeyed half of our life's way, / I found myself within a shadowed forest, / for I had lost the path that does not stray.")

In winter 2014–2015, Van Abbe Museum in Eindhoven exhibited Elisabeth Tonnard Artists' Books 2003–2014; in early 2016, Kunstruimte Galerie Block C in Groningen exhibited The Library.
