= Joachim Schmid =

German photographer (born 1955)

Joachim Schmid (born 1955) is a German artist, based in Berlin, who has worked with found photography since the early 1980s.

== Early life and education ==
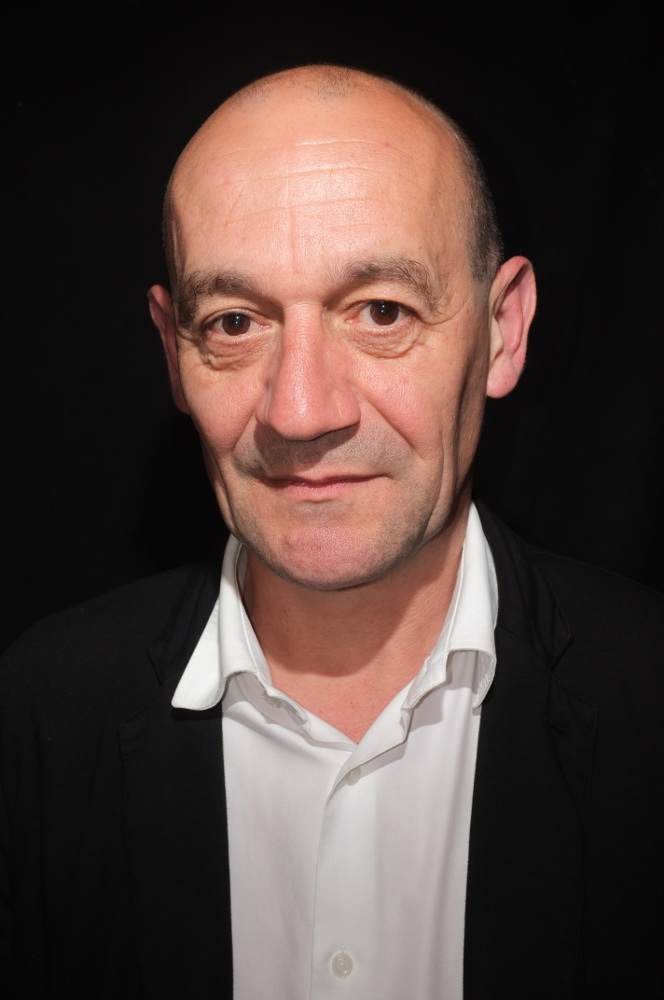
Schmid in 2014

Schmid studied visual communication at Fachhochschule für Gestaltung Schwäbisch Gmünd and Berlin University of the Arts from 1976 to 1981.

== Career ==
He began his career as a freelance critic and the publisher of Fotokritik, an iconoclastic and original contribution to West German photography. In the pages of Fotokritik and in his regular articles and lectures for other outlets, Schmid argued articulately and at times vehemently against prevailing, predominantly conservative notions of "art photography" and in favour of a broad, encompassing critique of photography as a form of cultural practice.

After ceasing publication of Fotokritik in 1987, Schmid focused on his own art production, based primarily on found photography and public image sources. Living near one of the largest flea markets in Berlin, he had already amassed a rich, deep, and varied collection of vernacular photography which formed the raw material for many of his works.

Schmid's use of extended series reflects his concern with photography as an encompassing, culturally dispersed and ubiquitous social and aesthetic discourse that runs throughout the public and private spheres of modern life.His artistic preoccupations reflect a close observation of photographic history and a fascination with photographic images themselves in all their alternately bizarre and conventionalized aspects.

Schmid's work has been exhibited internationally and is held in the collections of many major international institutions.

In 2007, Photoworks and Steidl published a comprehensive monograph Joachim Schmid Photoworks 1982–2007 on the occasion of his first retrospective exhibition at The Frances Young Tang Teaching Museum and Art Gallery at Skidmore College in Saratoga Springs, New York.

He has published more than one hundred artist's books, and at the end of 2009, Schmid founded the ABC Artists' Books Cooperative, a group of artists dedicated to self-publishing using print-on-demand technology.

At Rencontres d'Arles in 2011, Schmid was one of five curators (along with Joan Fontcuberta, Martin Parr, Erik Kessels, and Clément Chéroux) to sign his name to the From Here On manifesto, announcing a new age of photography as represented by thirty-six artists from around the world.

In 2014, the Hillmann Photography Initiative at the Carnegie Museum of Art released a documentary about Schmid's work, Discarded: Joachim Schmid and the Anti-Museum.

== Publications ==
=== Publications by Schmid ===
- Erste allgemeine Altfotosammlung. Berlin: Edition Fricke and Schmid, 1991. ISBN 3-927365-20-3.
- Bilder von der Straße. Berlin: Edition Fricke and Schmid, 1994. ISBN 3-927365-28-9.
- A Meeting on Holiday. Amsterdam: NEROC'VGM, 2003. ISBN 90-808285-4-8.
- Joachim Schmid. Photoworks 1982–2007. Brighton, UK: Photoworks, and Göttingen, Germany: Steidl, 2007. ISBN 978-3-86521-394-5. Edited by Gordon MacDonald and John S. Weber.
- Lambe Lambe. Barcelona, and Mexico City: Editorial RM, 2014. ISBN 978-84-16282-00-5.
- Ikea Sucks. Self-published, 2015.

=== Publications about Schmid ===
- Valtorta, Roberta. Joachim Schmid e le Fotografie Degli Altri. Milan: Johan & Levi, 2012. ISBN 978-88-6010-094-8.

== Sources ==
- Andress, Sarah. The Accidental Predator. Art on Paper, Vol. 12, No. 2, S. 34–35, New York, November 2007.
- Durden, Mark. Photography, Anonymity and the Archive: Joachim Schmid. Parachute, No. 109, p. 114–127. Montreal, 2003.
- Edwards, Elizabeth. Joachim Schmid –Belo Horizonte, Praça Rui Barbosa. Photoworks magazine, p. 36-39. Brighton, Spring/Summer 2005.
- Fontcuberta, Joan. Archive Noise. Photoworks magazine, p. 64–69. Brighton, Spring/Summer 2005.
- Gierstberg, Frits. No more photos please!. Perspektief, p. 58–66, Rotterdam 1991.
- MacDonald, Gordon and John S. Weber (2007). Joachim Schmid Photoworks 1982–2007. Photoworks, Brighton, and Steidl, Göttingen. ISBN 978-3-86521-394-5
- Menegoi, Simone. I am not a photographer. MOUSSE contemporary art magazine, p. 24–27. Milan, September 2007.
- Palmer, Daniel. Photography and Collaboration. From Conceptual Art to Crowdsourcing. p. 143–152, London, 2017
- Ribière, Mireille. Georges Perec/Joachim Schmid: tentative de description d’un projet de livre d’artistes. Cahiers Georges Perec No. 10, S. 227–252, Bordeaux 2010
- Sachsse, Rolf. Joachim Schmid's Archiv. History of Photography, Vol. 24, No. 3, p. 255–261. Oxford, Autumn 2000.
- Vacheron, Joël. Tausend Himmel et principe d’equivalence. Tausend Himmel and the Equivalence Principle. Volume, No. 1, p. 76–83, Paris, June 2010.
