= Lydia Moyer =

American artist

Lydia Moyer is a contemporary video and print artist who works primarily with themes of feminism, the environment, and history. She often appropriates existing materials and objects and blurs the premise of non-fiction. Her work has been featured a number of national and international exhibitions. Aside from her artwork, Moyer also worked as a professor at the University of Virginia (UVA) from 2006-2024.

== Early life ==
Moyer received her BFA at the New York State School of Art and Design at Alfred in 1999. In 2005, Moyer received her MFA in studio practice at UNC Chapel Hill.

== Career ==
After receiving her BFA, Moyer taught community documentary at Appalshop in Appalachian Kentucky.

Moyer's art is primarily video and print art. In an interview with Kiana Williams for Iris Magazine, a feminist magazine, at the University of Virginia, Moyer described her art making process as though it is her “job to distill personal experience or interest into something that other people can understand or from which they can get something, whether it be a feeling, an insight, a question, anything.”

== Artwork ==
Much of Moyer's work deals with the environmental and social issues that she describes as "the shadow of capitalism." Her video series The Forcing, for instance, deals directly with themes of environmental degradation and state violence, relying heavily on sound to connect benign images of nature with sometimes disturbing footage of current events. Deer, commonly associated with femininity, play a crucial role in many of Moyer's pieces.

In an earlier piece, Paradise, a feature-length video, Moyer investigates the relationship between culture and nature. In this piece, Moyer visits iconic locations where tragedies or disasters took place such as the Ninth Ward in New Orleans. The piece plays with contrast in the relationship between the viewer and their preconceptions of a sensationalized tragedy as well as the evidence of human society in the natural landscape

== Art projects ==
=== Videos ===
- Paradise (2011)
- The Teardrinkers at the Crow’s Nest (2013)
- Comet Song (2015)
- The Forcing (2015)
- The Forcing (no. 2) (2015)
- study for unsettling (2016)
- The Forcing (no. 4) (2016)
- Terre Nullius (2016)
- moments of silence (2016)
- Solstice (2017)
- Theforcing (no.6) (2017)

=== Books ===
- vault (2010)
- real estate (2011)
- Deerstains (2011)
- bounty (2011)
- The Unabomber’s Wife (2011)
- Listy Silver (2015)
- The Unabomber’s Ex-Wife (2017)
