= Clément Chéroux =

French photography historian and curator (born 1970)

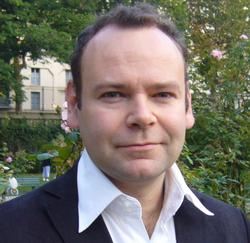
- Born: 1970 (age 55–56); Vélizy-Villacoublay, Île-de-France, French Fifth Republic

Academic background
- Education: Paris I
- Thesis: Une généalogie des formes récréatives en photographie, 1890-1940 (2004)
- Doctoral advisor: Philippe Dagen

Academic work
- Discipline: History
- Sub-discipline: Art history
- Institutions: Paris I; Paris 8; UNIL; Pompidou Centre; SFMOMA; MoMA
- Main interests: Photography
- Website: Clément Chéroux on Instagram

Clément Chéroux (born 1970) is a French photography historian and curator. He is Chief Curator of Photography at the Museum of Modern Art in New York City. He has also held senior curatorial positions at the Centre Pompidou in Paris and at the San Francisco Museum of Modern Art. Chéroux has overseen many exhibitions and books on photographers and photography.

He has been awarded the Prix Nadar (with Quentin Bajac) and a Royal Norwegian Order of Merit (Knight).

== Early life and education ==
Chéroux was born in Vélizy-Villacoublay, in the south-western suburbs of Paris.

He earned a degree from the École nationale supérieure de la photographie (national school of photography) in Arles and a PhD in art history from the University of Paris I, Panthéon-Sorbonne, Paris.

== Life and work ==
For ten years Chéroux taught history of photography at the University of Paris I, the University of Paris 8 Vincennes-Saint-Denis, and the University of Lausanne.

From 1998 he was executive editor of the magazine Études photographiques.

From 2007 to 2012 he was Curator and from 2013 to 2016 Chief Curator of Photography at the Centre Pompidou in Paris. From 2017 to 2020 he was Senior Curator of Photography at the San Francisco Museum of Modern Art, San Francisco, California. Since 2020 he has been the Joel and Anne Ehrenkranz Chief Curator of Photography at the Museum of Modern Art in New York City.

== Publications ==
- L'Expérience photographique d'August Strindberg: du naturalisme au sur-naturalisme. 1994. ISBN 2-7427-0374-8.
- Fautographie, petite histoire de l'erreur photographique. Yellow Now, 2003. ISBN 9782873401733.
- Fotografie und Geschichte. With Ilsen About. Leipzig: Hochschule für Grafik und Buchkunst Leipzig, 2004.
- The Perfect Medium: Photography and the Occult. Yale University Press, 2005. ISBN 978-0-300-11136-1.
- Henri Cartier-Bresson: le tir photographique. Découvertes Gallimard. Gallimard, 2008. ISBN 978-2-07-035625-6.
- La photographie qui fait mouche. Paris: Librairie Serge Plantureux, 2009.
- Diplopie, l'image photographique à l'ère des médias globalisés: essai sur le 11 septembre 2001. le Point du Jour, 2009. ISBN 978-2-912132-61-1.
- La Subversion des images, surréalism, photographie, film. Pompidou Centre, 2009. With Quentin Bajac. ISBN 978-2844263902.
- Shoot!: Existential Photography. Revolver, 2010. With Florian Ebner. ISBN 9783868950946.
- Ombres portées. Paris: Centre Pompidou, 2011.
- L'Immagine come punto interrogativo o il valore estatico del documento surrealista. Milan: Johan & Levi, 2012.
- Vernaculaires, essais d'histoire de la photographie Cherbourg: le Point du Jour, 2013.
- Henri Cartier-Bresson: Ici et maintenant. Paris: Centre Pompidou, 2013. Published on the occasion of an exhibition at the Centre Pompidou, 2014.
  - Henri Cartier-Bresson: Here and Now. Thames & Hudson, 2014. ISBN 9780500544303.
- Avant l'avant-garde, du jeu en photographie. Paris: Textuel, 2015.
- Magnum Manifesto. Thames & Hudson, 2017. ISBN 9780500544556.
- Walker Evans. Prestel, 2017. ISBN 9783791357065.
- Si la vue vaut d'être vécue, miscellanées photographiques (2019)
- Louis Stettner: Traveling Light. Cernunnos, 2019. ISBN 978-2374951188.
- La Voix du voir: Les grands entretiens de la Fondation Henri Cartier-Bresson = the voice of seeing: the major talks of the Henri Cartier-Bresson Foundation. Paris: Xavier Barral, 2019. ISBN 978-2365111492.
- Since 1839… Eleven Essays on Photography. The MIT Press, 2021. ISBN 9780262045773

== Exhibitions curated ==
- Shoot!, Rencontres d'Arles, Arles, France, 2010. Curated by Chéroux, Martin Parr, Erik Kessels, Joan Fontcuberta, and Joachim Schmid.
- From Here On, Rencontres d'Arles, Arles, France, 2011
- Edvard Munch, l'Oeil Moderne, Pompidou Centre, Paris, 2011/2012; Tate Modern, London, 2012
- Paparazzi! Photographers, Stars and Artists, Pompidou Centre, Paris, 2014
- Henri Cartier-Bresson, Pompidou Centre, Paris, 2014
- Louis Stettner: Here and There, Pompidou Centre, Paris, 2016; Louis Stettner: Traveling Light, San Francisco Museum of Modern Art, San Francisco, California. Curated by Chéroux and Julie Jones.

== Awards ==
- 2009: Prix Nadar with Quentin Bajac for the book La Subversion des images, surréalism, photographie, film
- 2015: Royal Norwegian Order of Merit (Knight), for the exhibition Edvard Munch, the Modern Eye
