= Joan Fontcuberta =

Spanish photographer

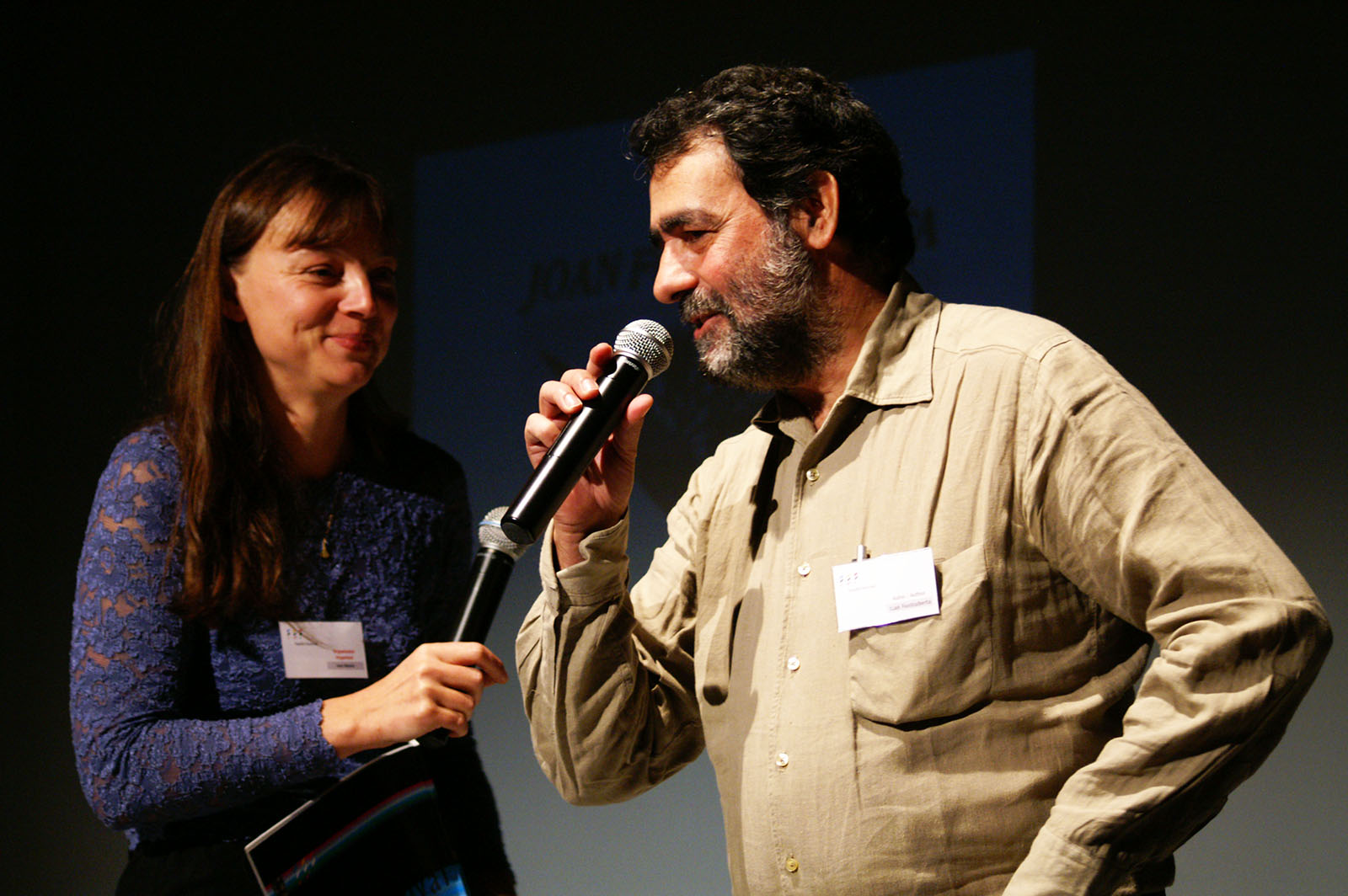
- Fontcuberta in 2007
- Born: 24 February 1955 (age 71); Barcelona, Spain
- Education: Autonomous University of Barcelona
- Occupation: Photographer
- Awards: David Octavius Hill Medal, 1988; Chevalier des Arts et des Lettres, 1994; Premio Nacional de Fotografía, 1988; Premio Nacional de Ensayo (España), 2011; Hasselblad Award, 2013
- Website: www.fontcuberta.com

Joan Fontcuberta (born 24 February 1955) is a Spanish conceptual artist and photographer whose best-known works, such as Fauna and Sputnik, examine the truthfulness of photography. In addition, he is a writer, editor, teacher, and curator.

== Biography ==
Fontcuberta was born in Barcelona, Catalonia, Spain. He received a degree in communications from the Autonomous University of Barcelona in 1977. He worked in advertising in his early career, and his family had also worked in advertising. From 1979 to 1986 he was a professor at the Faculty of Fine Arts of the University of Barcelona, after which he earned a living through his art.

In 1980 he co-founded the Spanish/English visual arts journal PhotoVision, and he is still Editor in Chief. Since 1993 Fontcuberta has been a professor of audiovisual communication at Pompeu Fabra University in Barcelona. Among other teaching appointments, he was visiting lecturer in Visual and Environmental Studies at Harvard University in 2003. Among other awards, he was named an Officer in the Order of Arts and Letters by the French Ministry of Culture in 1994. His curatorial experience includes serving as the artistic director of the 1996 Rencontres d'Arles, an international photography festival. He exhibited at Les Rencontres d'Arles, France, in 2005 and 2009.

One of his fingers is missing as a result, he said in a 2014 interview, to a home-made bomb blowing up in his hand. He says that the missing finger makes him a terrible photographer, although in 2013 he won the Hasselblad International Award in Photography.

== Approach to art ==
Fontcuberta describes himself as "self-taught in photography" and considers himself "a conceptual artist using photography." He states that the propaganda and dictatorship of Spain under Franco in his first 20 years led him to be skeptical about authority, which is reflected in his art. His background in communications and advertising led him to contemplate the relationship between photography and truth, and Fontcuberta believes that humor is an important component of his work. His art has been described as "postmodern."

== Works in museums ==
Fontcuberta's works are held in the permanent collections of many museums, such as Art Institute of Chicago; Center for Creative Photography, Tucson; George Eastman House, Rochester; Los Angeles County Museum of Art; Metropolitan Museum of Art, New York; Musée National d’Art Moderne / Centre Georges Pompidou, Paris; Museo Nacional de Bellas Artes, Buenos Aires; Museu d'Art Contemporani de Barcelona; Museum Folkwang, Essen; Museum Ludwig, Cologne; Museum of Fine Arts, Houston; Museum of Modern Art, New York; National Gallery of Canada, Ottawa; and San Francisco Museum of Modern Art.

== Exhibitions ==
Solo exhibitions of single series of Fontcuberta's works include the following (with earliest known year of exhibition in parentheses):

=== Herbarium (1984) ===
In this series, Fontcuberta "arranged inanimate objects such as electrical cord, plastic, a shaving brush or a rubber hose into what appear to be exotic plants", thereby creating "pseudoplants". The black and white still-life photographs of these constructions were "drily classified in Latin" and thereby resembled the photographs of Karl Blossfeldt. The photographs were exhibited in Belgium, the United States, Germany, Japan, Italy, Spain, Canada, and France.

=== Fauna (1987) ===
Also known as "Dr. Ameisenhaufen's Fauna" or "Secret Fauna", Fontcuberta created this series in collaboration with the writer and photographer Pere Formiguera. The premise was that Fontcuberta and Formiguera discovered the long-lost archives of German zoologist Dr. Peter Ameisenhaufen, who was born in 1895 and who disappeared mysteriously in 1955. Ameisenhaufen had catalogued a number of unusual animals; for example, Cercopithecus icarocornu resembles a monkey with a unicorn-like horn on its head and wings; and Solenoglypha polipodida resembles a snake with 12 feet.

A review of the exhibition as presented in 1988 at the Museum of Modern Art noted that the evidence presented for the existence of the animals included "photographs... both in their natural habitats and in laboratory situations; detailed field notes, both in the original German and English translations; an occasional skeletal X-ray or dissection drawing; two or three tapes of the animals' cries, and in one case, an actual stuffed specimen". Furthermore, a video displayed interviews in which various people discussed Ameisenhaufen's life.

The exhibition was shown in England, Spain, Denmark, Germany, Japan, Canada and the United States. The fake animals displayed at the exhibitions varied according to the "legends, traditions, and superstitions" of the place hosting the exhibition. Among other clues suggesting that the exhibition was a hoax, "Formiguera" and "Ameisenhaufen" both mean "anthill," and the name of "Hans von Kubert" (Ameisenhaufen's research assistant) sounds like "Joan Fontcuberta."

Fontcuberta reported that responses to the exhibition ranged "from people who understand that it is a farce and appreciate the satire and the humor of it, to people who understand it's a farce and are angry at you for trying to fool them, to people who believe it and are angry, to people who believe it and are delighted." He said in another interview that during the 1989 exhibition in the Barcelona Museum of Natural Science, "30% of the visitors aged 20 to 30, with university training, believed that some of our animals could have existed."

=== Constellations (1993) ===
In this series, "the images of the cosmos are strewn with a fine stardust", but "what they actually record is dust, crushed insects and other debris that accumulated on the windshield of Mr. Fontcuberta's car." The photographs were created "by applying sheets of 8-by-10-inch film directly to the glass and shining a light through, creating photograms, which were then made into Cibachrome prints."

=== Artist and the Photograph (1995) ===
In this series, Fontcuberta "imagine[d] and realize[d] photographic works by the four greatest Spanish artists of the twentieth century, namely Pablo Picasso, Joan Miró, Salvador Dalí and Antoni Tàpies." He mixed fact (e.g., that Picasso and André Villers collaborated on a series of lithographs called "Diurnes") with fiction (e.g., that a researcher recently found discarded images from the series). The purpose of this series was to explore how curators and museums influence the public's perception of art.

=== Sputnik (1997) ===
For this project, Fontcuberta fabricated evidence that the Soyuz 2 spacecraft was crewed by cosmonaut Ivan Istochnikov. Soyuz 1, an actual Soviet space mission in 1967, had ended with the death of cosmonaut Vladimir Komarov when the spacecraft crashed on landing. In 1968, according to the fabricated story, "Istochnikov and his canine companion Kloka mysteriously vanished after leaving the Soyuz 2 capsule for a routine space walk. When the Soyuz 3 arrived for a docking maneuver, it found only a vodka bottle containing a note, floating in orbit outside the empty, meteorite-damaged ship." The real Soyuz 3 spacecraft did rendezvous with Soyuz 2, but Soyuz 2 was an uncrewed mission launched as a rendezvous target for Soyuz 3. According to Fontcuberta, Soviet officials deleted Istochnikov from official Soviet history to avoid embarrassment; however, the "Sputnik Foundation" discovered Istochnikov's "voice transcriptions, videos, original annotations, some of his personal effects, and photographs taken throughout his lifetime." The exhibition of artifacts (e.g., photographs) related to "Soyuz 2" was shown in many countries, including Spain, France, Portugal, Italy, Mexico, Japan, and the United States. Among other reactions to the exhibition, a Russian ambassador "got extremely angry because [Fontcuberta] was insulting the glorious Russian past and threatened to present a diplomatic complaint."

Several lines of evidence available since the first exhibition of "Sputnik" in 1997 in Madrid suggested that the story and artifacts form an elaborate hoax:

- The name "Ivan Istochnikov" is a Russian translation of Joan Fontcuberta's name; in specific, "Joan" and "Ivan" both translate to "John" and "Fontcuberta and Istochnikov both mean 'hidden fountain'".
- The photographs of Istochnikov show Fontcuberta's face.
- Pages of the official Web site of the Madrid exhibition contain the words "PURE FICTION" toward the top of each page in light red text on a dark red background or light pink text on a white background.
- The front and rear endpapers of the catalog accompanying the Madrid exhibition have the words "it's all fiction" in Russian and Spanish printed on them using glow-in-the-dark ink.
- At the Web site of Spanish newspaper El Mundo, the third of three pages concerning the Madrid exhibition states that "the report which we published on the previous pages is a product of his [Fontcuberta's] imagination."

Nevertheless, "many unsuspecting folks have been taken in by the story", including the Spanish journalist Iker Jiménez. On 11 June 2006 television show Cuarto Milenio (Fourth Millennium), Jiménez said (in Spanish) about Istochnikov "the question is why [he was deleted from history], what he had done, why he annoyed [the Soviet government]." In response, "one of Jiménez's collaborators, Gerardo Pelaez, said the Soviet authorities made Istochnikov disappear because he was the personification of 'a noisy failure'." Fontcuberta was quoted as saying about Jiménez's mistake "It's all very funny!" The next week, Jiménez issued a correction, saying that the story was a "cosmic urban legend."

At least one Web page states "The Mexican magazine Luna Cornea, Number 14, January/April 1998, p. 58, already displayed the photos and tragic story of the [Soyuz 2] mission as the unalloyed truth." However:

- The director of the magazine was Pablo Ortiz Monasterio, who edited a 1985 book for which Fontcuberta wrote the introduction.
- Under Ortiz Monasterio's direction, the magazine had earlier published an article about Fontcuberta's Fauna project that stated that the animals were "imaginary."
- The excerpt from Sputnik in question is accompanied by a paragraph that begins "The Catalan photographer and researcher Joan Fontcuberta, in whose work the truths -- or lies -- of images have been placed at the service of natural history, has sent Luna Córnea his most recent finding, 'Sputnik.'"

Japanese singer Akino Arai wrote a song Sputnik (published in the Album Furu Platinum) about Istochnikov and his dog Kloka. The song begins with the fragment from the Russian poem written by Evtushenko, which was also used in the Sputnik exhibition Catalogue. The poem in this song is a back translation and does not fit to the Russian original in the book. Also, the 2013 sci-fi feature film The Cosmonaut is heavily inspired by Fontcuberta's hoax.

=== Hemograms (1998) ===
Fontcuberta wrote about this series: "The idea was to invite friends and people close to me to provide a sample of their blood... [on] a piece of transparent film.... Immediately afterward, I make an enlargement on photographic paper using the blood as a negative...." The photographs have been described as "exploring identity through blood and its self-expression as abstract art." A review of some photographs from the series stated that they caused the writer to "imagine anonymous blood donors, laboratory procedures, and the possibility of AIDS, or cancer."

=== Sirens (2000) ===
This series consisted of the installation of fake fossils of mermaids in the Réserve Géologique de Haute-Provence in Digne-les-Bains in southern France, which were then photographed. Fontcuberta created a story about how the "Hydropithecus" (water-monkey) fossils were discovered by a "Father Jean Fontana" whose face resembles Fontcuberta's. Subsequently, the fossils have "become a permanent feature of the park."

=== Pin Zhuang (2001) ===
The name of this work "is Chinese for 'dismantled', 'dismounted' or 'puzzle." It was inspired by the 2001 Hainan Island incident "in which an American spy plane that crashed in China was thoroughly picked over and returned to the United States in pieces." The exhibition, which "depict[ed] model planes carefully mis-constructed by the artist and photographed on 'flights' through outer space, was described as "haunting, poetic and thought-provoking."

=== Karelia: Miracles & Co. (2002) ===
The intent of this series was to "de-dramatize the irrational force behind religious feelings, while exposing the accompanying economic commercialization and political manipulation." The premise was that Fontcuberta visited a monastery in the Karelia region between Finland and Russia "to unveil the hoax" that it trains students to perform miracles. For example, in the photograph "The Miracle of the Flesh," Fontcuberta is shown holding a slice of ham with an image of Che Guevara on it, and the caption states that Adolf Hitler or Osama bin Laden can be seen on other ham slices depending on the food eaten by the pig. A 2003 exhibition in New York was called "an uncommonly clever tour de force."

=== Orogenesis (2002) ===
In this project, also known as "Landscapes without Memory," Fontcuberta "create[d] plausible, even spectacular landscapes using Terragen, a computer program originally created for military and scientific uses that turns maps into images of three-dimensional terrain." However, instead of starting with scans of maps, Fontcuberta used "scans of historical artworks such as a Henri Rousseau painting or Gustave Le Gray photograph, as well as parts of the human body" to produce "splendid and astonishing landscapes... (lakes, mountains, rocky deserts)". One review noted that the series suggests a "crisis in contemporary landscape art... [for example] man's emotional and psychological relationship with a rapidly vanishing natural environment." The works suggest that even "scientific" images are influenced by human culture. Along with Googlegrams, the Orogenesis series was said to "call into question the boundaries of representation in the information age."

=== Googlegrams (2005) ===
Fontcuberta wrote about this series "The basic idea consists in selecting images that have become icons of our time. ... [The images are] refashioned using a freeware photo mosaic programme. ... the programme was connected to the Internet and used the search engine Google to locate thousands of images on the basis of search criteria determined by the user, normally images associated with one or several words. In the Abu Ghraib photograph, for example, the search engine was given the names of top officials, civilian contractors and enlisted soldiers cited in the 'Final Report of the Independent Panel to Review DoD Detention Operations'...." His intent was to "make an ironic criticism" of beliefs that people on the Internet "shar[e] an exhaustive, universal, and democratic conscience." Reviews of works in the series were mixed. In 2007, the Simon Wiesenthal Center objected to a Googlegram showing the wall in the Palestinian West Bank that was a mosaic of photographs of Nazi concentration camps, stating that it was "a smug exercise in banalizing the horrors of the Holocaust." The exhibition traveled widely, including shows in Paris, Naples, and Beijing.

=== Deconstructing Osama (2007) ===
Exhibited at the Pilar and Joan Miró Foundation in Mallorca in 2007, this project concerned the purported "leader of Al Qaeda's military wing Dr. Fasqiyta Ul-Junat" who "was in reality an actor and singer named Manbaa Mokfhi who had appeared in soap operas on Arab television networks and was the public face of a MeccaCola advertising campaign." He was not actually a terrorist but instead had been "hired to play the role." After Mokfhi disappeared mysteriously, "intelligence services then invented the figure of Osama bin Laden and his associates in which to create the face of terror."

Fontcuberta himself appears as Ul-Junat / Mokfhi. Furthermore, the name "Fontcuberta, Joan" is similar to the name "Fasqiyta Ul-Junat." The "in-jokes" in the project include the similarity of the names of the photographers Ben Kalish Ezab and Ben Salaad to characters in The Adventures of Tintin, a picture of photographer Martin Parr in a keffiyeh, and the allusion of the "Office of Strategic Impact" in the project to the real Office of Special Plans of the Pentagon.

=== Camouflages (2014) ===
In this exhibition at the Maison Européenne de la Photographie, Fontcuberta calls into question traditional methods for determining fact and authority. A large portion of the exhibit is dedicated to the meticulous photojournalism of a fictionalized Fontcuberta who meets with likewise fictional naturalists and records their discoveries. Fantastical animals and plants, many of them created by grafting real organisms together, are presented sketched, taximerdized, and intricately described. The largest portion of the exhibit documents the discovery of Hydropithecus, an ancient siren whose name references Australopithecus.

=== Trauma (2016) ===
Joan Fontcuberta's project Trauma "arises from the hypothesis that the images undergo an organic metabolism: they are born, they grow, they reproduce and die to restart again the cycle of life". The subjects of Trauma include photochemical reactions, oxidation stains, fungal proliferation, damaged emulsion: "in short, photographic wounds and scars...Behind diaphanous veils of mold or wedged between water stains, we find the silhouettes of people and landscapes, the original subjects of the photographer’s lens.". The photographs were exhibited in Havana.

== Books by and about Fontcuberta ==
Books with Fontcuberta's work include the following:

- Fontcuberta, Joan, curator. Idas & Chaos: Trends in Spanish Photography 1920-1945. New York: U.S.-Spanish Joint Committee for Cultural and Educational Cooperation, 1985. ISBN 84-7483-435-X.
- Fontcuberta, Joan. Herbarium. Göttingen, West Germany: European Photography, 1985. ISBN 3-923283-09-1 (hardcover) or ISBN 3-923283-07-5 (paperback) or ISBN 3-923283-08-3 (deluxe).
- Fontcuberta, Joan, and Pere Formiguera. Dr. Ameisenhaufen's fauna. Göttingen, West Germany: European Photography, 1988. ISBN 3-923283-16-4. With a tan paper cover, this first edition "mimics the look and feel of a scientific study so well that it occasionally appears in libraries and bookstores as a zoology text." It was chosen as "one of the most important photographic publications in modern times." Other editions of the book include:
  - Fauna Secreta. Barcelona: Fundació Caixa de Catalunya, 1989.
  - Fauna. [Sevilla]: Junta de Andalucía, 1989. (Publisher also given as "[Spain]: PhotoVision" or "Seville: The Museum [Museo de Arte Contemporaneo].") ISBN 84-86620-04-X.
  - Himitsu No Dobutsushi. Tokyo: Chikuma Shobo, 1991. ISBN 4-480-87154-3.
  - Fauna. [Utrera, Sevilla]: PhotoVision, 1999. ISBN 84-86620-15-5 (Spanish) or ISBN 84-86620-17-1 (French) or ISBN 84-86620-16-3 (English).
- Història artificial: el cor i les tenebres: Joan Fontcuberta: IVAM Centre Julio González, 26 novembre 1992/24 de gener 1993. [Valencia]: Le Centre, 1992. ISBN 84-482-0023-3.
- Fontcuberta, Joan. Le baiser de Judas: photographie et vérité. Arles: Actes Sud, 1996. ISBN 2-7427-0839-1.
- Fontcuberta, Joan. El beso de Judas: fotografía y verdad. Barcelona: Gustavo Gili, 1997. ISBN 84-252-1480-7.
- Kondakova, Olga, et al. Sputnik. Madrid: Fundación Arte y Tecnología, 1997. ISBN 84-89884-00-5. The book was said to "recall[] the heyday of the great photobooks of El Lissitzky and Alexander Rodchenko."
- Fontcuberta, Joan. Joan Fontcuberta: twilight zones. Barcelona: Actar, 1999. ISBN 84-95273-15-2.
- Fontcuberta, Joan. Joan Fontcuberta: volte face: a l'envers de la science, les leçons de l'histoire. Marseille: Images en manoeuvres: Centre d'Art, 2000. ISBN 2-908445-44-1.
- Zabalbeascoa, Anatxu, and Joan Fontcuberta. The artist and the photograph. Barcelona: Actar, 2000. ISBN 84-95273-30-6.
- Fontcuberta, Joan. Contranatura. Alicante, Spain: Museo de la Universidad de Alicante, 2001. ISBN 84-95273-83-7.
- Fontcuberta, Joan. Securitas. Madrid: Fundación Telefónica, 2001, ISBN 84-89884-26-9. Also Barcelona: Editorial Gustavo Gili, 2001, ISBN 84-252-1896-9.
- Caujolle, Christian. Joan Fontcuberta. London and New York: Phaidon, 2001. ISBN 0-7148-4031-9.
- Fontcuberta, Joan. Photography: crisis of history. Barcelona: Actar, 2002. ISBN 84-95273-50-0.
- Fontcuberta, Joan. Joan Fontcuberta: landscapes without memory. New York: Aperture, 2005. ISBN 1-931788-79-0.
- Fontcuberta, Joan. Datascapes: Orogenesis/Googlegrams. Sevilla: PhotoVision, 2007. ISBN 978-84-931546-4-6.
- Fontcuberta, Joan. Deconstructing Osama: the truth about the case of Manbaa Mokfhi. Barcelona: Actar, 2007. ISBN 978-84-96540-90-3.
- Fontcuberta, Joan. Historias de la fotografía española. Escritos 1977-2004. Barcelona: Gustavo Gili, 2008. ISBN 978-84-252-2287-0.
- Fontcuberta, Joan. Googlegramas. Munich: Galerie von Braunbehrens, 2008. ISBN 978-3-922268-49-9.
- Fontcuberta, Joan. El Libro de las Maravillas. Barcelona: Ayuntamiento de Barcelona y Actar, 2008. ISBN 978-84-9850-126-1, ISBN 978-84-96954-81-6.
- Fontcuberta, Joan. Albarracín. Santa Iocencia. Holly Innocence. Albarracín: Estancias Creativas, 2009. ISBN 978-84-613-4827-5.
- Ródenas, Gabri, "Fontcubertin Blow up Blow up: Ekshumacija Antonionija/ Fontcuberta´s Blow up Blow up: Exhuming Antonioni" in Fotografija, Eslovenia, December 2009. ISSN 1408-3566.
- Fontcuberta, Joan. The Photography of Nature & The Nature of Photography, London: Mack, 2013. ISBN 9781907946516
- Pandora's Camera. London: Mack, 2014. ISBN 9781910164037. English translation. 16 essays with illustrations.
- Animal Trouvé. Zine Collection 15. Paris: Bessard, 2014. Edition of 300 copies.

== Documentaries ==
F For Fontcuberta is a 2005 documentary directed by Gerardo Panichi and Daniele Villa - Citrullo International, and produced by Citrullo International, TV de Catalunya, Banff Centre, and Jerome Bellavista Productions.

== See also ==
- Post-truth
- Angela Singer
