= Erik Kessels =

Dutch artist, designer and curator

Erik Kessels (1966) is a Dutch artist, designer and curator with a particular interest in photography, and co-founder of KesselsKramer, an advertising agency in Amsterdam. Kessels and Johan Kramer established the "legendary and unorthodox" KesselsKramer in 1996, and KesselsKramer Publishing, their Amsterdam-based publishing house.

He is "best known as a book publisher specialising in absurdist found photography", extensively publishing his and others' found and vernacular photography. Notable works include the long-running series Useful Photography, which he edits with others, and his own In Almost Every Picture. Sean O'Hagan, writing in The Guardian, said "His magazine, Useful Photography, forgoes art and documentary for images that are purely functional. ... Humour is the unifying undercurrent here as it is in KesselsKramer's series of photo books, In Almost Every Picture".

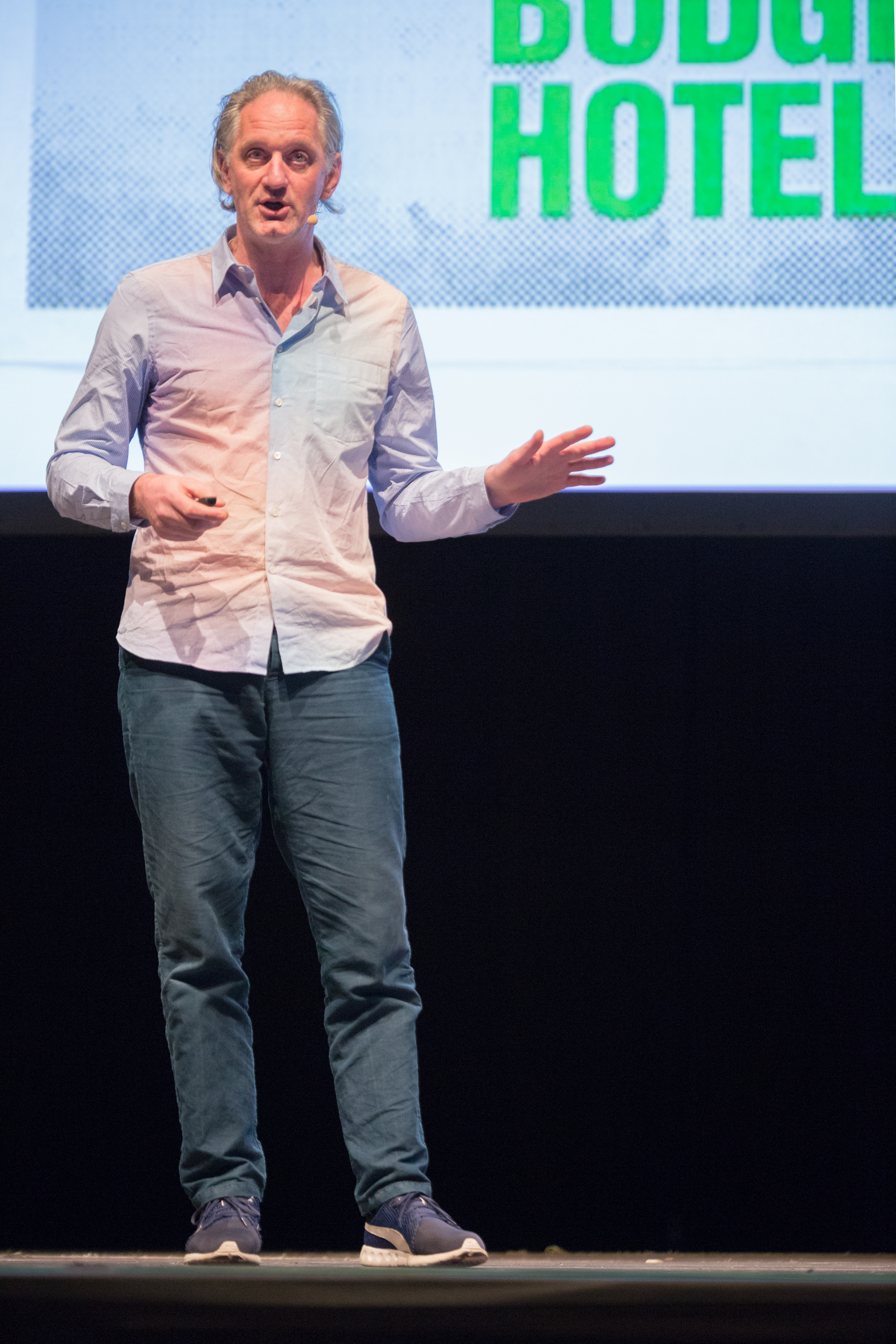
Kessels in 2016

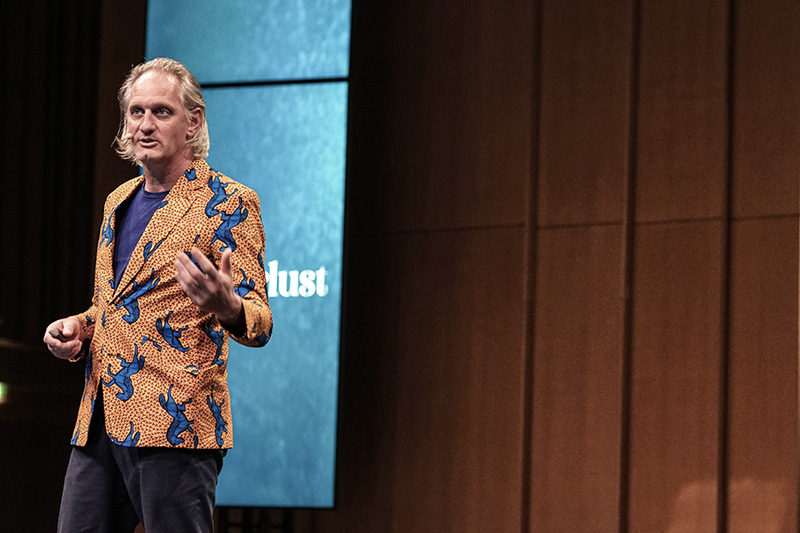
Kessels at Typo Berlin 2017

== Life and work ==
Kessels was born in Roermond, Netherlands and grew up in the adjacent village Swalmen.

He collects photographs he finds on flea markets, fairs, in junk shops, and online, and appropriates and re-contextualises them. He extensively publishes his and others' found and vernacular photography through KesselsKramer Publishing. Notable works include the long-running series Useful Photography, which he edits with others, and his own In Almost Every Picture. Among the works he published through other publishers are Een Idee aub (2012) about creativity on command, Failed it (2016) about turning mistakes into brilliant ideas and The Many Lives of Erik Kessels (2017), an overview of his work so far. Sean O'Hagan, writing in The Guardian, said "Kessels made his name as a champion of found photography, seeking out discarded family albums in order to show us anew their mundane beauty and oddness. He is best known for his magazine Useful Photography, which celebrates images of the purely functional, and his series of books In Almost Every Picture, which home in on motifs that appear accidentally in amateur photo albums – such as wayward fingers. ... More recently, Kessels has become “more and more interested in the stories of the photographs" rather than the images themselves." His most successful publication is In Almost Every Picture 7. Parr and Badger include In Almost Every Picture 4 (2006) in the third volume of their photobook history. In it they say "Erik Kessels is one of the guiding lights behind the magazine Useful Photography, edited by a group of (mainly) Dutch photographers in a witty yet serious manner. In his ongoing series In Almost Every Picture, he continues his exploration of the found snapshot as a solo author. The idea in this series is to gather together a group of snapshots devoted to a theme and treat them as if the photographers were vernacular "conceptual" artists – which in a sense they are."

In 2015 Kessels was shortlisted for the Deutsche Börse Photography Prize, for Unfinished Father, along with Trevor Paglen, Laura El-Tantawy, and Tobias Zielony.

Kessels' exhibition Destroy My Face, as part of the BredaPhoto 2020 festival in the Netherlands, was met with widespread criticism on social media of misogyny, and was eventually removed by the venue, Pier15 Skatepark. The work, which Kessels describes as an "interactive work", consists of composite portraits created by an algorithm based on images on the internet of people who have undergone plastic and cosmetic surgery. The photos of women's faces were printed as sticker folie and affixed to the floor surface of the skatepark, where visitors could contribute to the destruction of the faces through the activity of skating over the prints.

After the festival opened on 9 September 2020, an open letter to the festival and the skatepark, signed by artists, designers, photographers, and other creatives under the name We Are Not A Playground, described the work and its implementation as misogynistic. Within only a few days, as of 14 September 2020, the letter had collected more than 2000 signatures.

== KesselsKramer and KesselsKramer Publishing ==
KesselsKramer is an independent, advertising agency established by Kessels and Johan Kramer in 1996. It is based in Amsterdam with offices in London and Los Angeles, and a staff of about fifty.

KesselsKramer has been called "legendary and unorthodox". Its notable advertising campaigns have been "The Worst Hotel In The World" for Hans Brinker Budget Hotel in Amsterdam, and "I Amsterdam" for the city of Amsterdam.

KesselsKramer Publishing is an Amsterdam-based publishing house. It produces books on photography, art, and some fiction. KesselsKramer only publishes works created in house by its staff.

== Publications ==
=== Publications and zines by Kessels and with others ===
- Missing links. Amsterdam: KesselsKramer, 1998. ISBN 978-90-803927-2-4. Photographs by Kessels. Edited by Julian Germain.
- The Instant Men. Amsterdam: Do Publishing Co; Amsterdam: KesselsKramer, 1999. ISBN 978-90-803927-5-5. Photographs by Kessels.
- Hot or Not. Amsterdam: Gerrit Rietveld Academie, 2002. ISBN 978-9070478025.
- World Press Photo Joop Swart Masterclass: the first decade. Amsterdam: Stichting World Press Photo, 2004. Concept, edit and design by Kessels. ISBN 9789080369825.
- Loving your pictures. Amsterdam: KesselsKramer, 2006. ISBN 978-90-290-7796-5. Collected and edited by Kessels. Texts by Kessels and Pauline Terreehorst.
- Models: A Collection of 132 German Police Uniforms and How They Should Be Worn. Amsterdam: KesselsKramer, 2006. ISBN 978-90-70478-04-9. Collected and edited by Kessels.
- Wonder. Amsterdam: KesselsKramer, 2006. ISBN 978-90-70478-08-7. Found photographs by Kessels, Sabine Verschueren, Hans Wolf, and Andre Thijssen.
- Bangkok Beauties. Amsterdam: KesselsKramer, 2007. Collected, edited and designed by Kessels. Edition of 250 copies.
  - Boxed version with 12 handkerchiefs and photo print. Edition of 25 copies.
- Strangers in my Photoalbum. Amsterdam: KesselsKramer, 2007. Collected and edited by Kessels. Edition of 250 copies.
- Amateurism. Amsterdam: KesselsKramer, 2008. ISBN 978-90-70478-17-9. Collaboration with the Academy of Architecture, Amsterdam. Text by Kessels.
- Couples. Amsterdam: KesselsKramer, 2008. ISBN 978-90-70478-19-3. Collected and edited by Kessels.
- Photo Cubes. Amsterdam: KesselsKramer, 2008. ISBN 978-90-70478-20-9. Collected and edited by Kessels.
- On Show. Howard Smith, 2008. Collaboration with Browns Design and Howard Smith Paper. Collected and edited by Kessels.
- Tree Paintings. Amsterdam: KesselsKramer, 2009. ISBN 978-90-70478-26-1. Photographs by Kessels. Edition of 500 copies.
- Bombay beauties. Amsterdam: KesselsKramer, 2009. ISBN 978-90-70478-27-8. Collected, edited and designed by Kessels.
- Use Me Abuse Me. ISBN 978-90-70478-28-5. Exhibition catalogue, New York Photo Festival 2010, curated by Kessels.
- Very Funny: Rosebud Magazine No. 7. Verlag für moderne Kunst Nürnberg, 2010. ISBN 978-3941185746. Edited by Kessels and Ralf Herms. With contributions from Paul Graves and Jason Polan.
- Brussels Beauties. Amsterdam: KesselsKramer, 2010. ISBN 978-90-70478-33-9.
- Good luck. Amsterdam: Stichting Collectieve Propaganda van het Nederlandse Boek, 2011. ISBN 9789059651289. By Kessels and Christine Otten.
- Dancing with Numbers. Amsterdam: KesselsKramer, 2012. Collected, edited and designed by Kessels.
- Terribly Awesome Photobooks. Amsterdam: Art Paper Editions, 2012. By Kessels and Paul Kooiker. ISBN 9789490800093.
- Berlin Beauties. Amsterdam: KesselsKramer, 2013. Collected, edited and designed by Kessels. Edition of 250 copies.
- Me TV. Amsterdam: KesselsKramer, 2013. Collected and edited by Thomas Sauvin and Kessels. Edition of 300 copies.
- Incredibly Small Photobooks. APE 31. Ghent: Art Paper Editions, 2013. By Kessels and Paul Kooiker. ISBN 9789490800154.
- Tables to Meet. Amsterdam: Idea, 2014. By Kessels, Erik Steinbrecher and Erik van der Weijde. ISBN 978-94-91047-05-3.
- Mother Nature: Photo's [sic] of Females Flourishing. Paris: RVB, 2014. ISBN 9791090306264. With an essay by Francesca Seravalle and with a contribution by Angela Lidderdale.
- Album Beauty. Paris: RVB, 2015. ISBN 979-1090306097.
- Unfinished Father. Paris: RVB, 2015. ISBN 979-10-90306-38-7. 31 photographs and 4 photographic stickers. Edition of 500 copies.
- Image Tsunami. Rm, 2016. ISBN 9788416282531 .
- Failed it!: How to turn mistakes into ideas and other advice for successfully screwing up. London: Phaidon Press, 2016. ISBN 978-0714871196.
  - Fast Perfekt: Die Kunst, hemmungslos zu scheitern. Wie aus Fehlern Ideen entstehen. Köln: DuMont Buchverlag, 2016. ISBN 9783832199135. In German.
- Cahirs Collection. Amsterdam: KesselsKramer, ?. 10 signed books in box. Edition of 50 copies. Includes American Zoo, Anonymous, Bad Food Gone Worse, Bangkok Beauties, Bombay Beauties, Brussels Beauties, Couples, Photo Cubes, Strangers in my Photo Album, and Tree Paintings.
- The Many Lives of Erik Kessels. New York: Aperture; Torino, Italy: Camera – Centro Italiano per la Fotografia, 2017. Photographs and Text by Kessels. ISBN 978-1-59711-416-5. Also with texts by Francesco Zanot, Hans Aarsman, Simon Baker, and Sandra S. Phillips.

==== Useful Photography ====
- Useful Photography 1. Amsterdam: KesselsKramer. Collected and edited by Hans Aarsman, Claudie de Cleen, Julian Germain, Kessels, and Hans van der Meer. ISBN 978-90-72007-70-4.
- Useful Photography 2. Amsterdam: KesselsKramer. Collected and edited by Aarsman, de Cleen, Germain, Kessels, and van der Meer. ISBN 978-90-75380-46-0.
- Useful Photography 3. Amsterdam: KesselsKramer. Collected and edited by Aarsman, de Cleen, Germain, Kessels, and van der Meer. ISBN 978-90-75380-62-0.
- Useful Photography 4. Amsterdam: KesselsKramer. Photographs by Ad van Denderen. Edited by Hans Aarsman, Claudie de Cleen, Julian Germain, Kessels, and van der Meer. ISBN 978-90-75380-96-5.
- Useful Photography 5. Amsterdam: KesselsKramer. Collected and edited by Aarsman, de Cleen, Germain, Kessels, and van der Meer. ISBN 978-90-70478-06-3.
- Useful Photography 6. Amsterdam: KesselsKramer. Collected and edited by Aarsman, de Cleen, Germain, Kessels, and van der Meer. ISBN 978-90-70478-12-4.
- Useful Photography 7. Amsterdam: KesselsKramer. Collected and edited by Aarsman, de Cleen, Germain, Kessels, and van der Meer. ISBN 978-90-70478-16-2.
- Useful Photography 8. Amsterdam: KesselsKramer. Collected and edited by Aarsman, de Cleen, Germain, Kessels, van der Meer, and Adriaan van der Ploeg. ISBN 978-90-70478-22-3.
- Useful Photography 9. Amsterdam: KesselsKramer. Collected and edited by Aarsman, de Cleen, Germain, Kessels, and van der Meer. ISBN 978-90-70478-25-4.
- Useful Photography 10. Amsterdam: KesselsKramer. Collected and edited by Aarsman, de Cleen, Germain, Kessels, and van der Meer. ISBN 978-90-70478-34-6.
- Useful Photography 11. Amsterdam: KesselsKramer. Collected and edited by Aarsman, de Cleen, Germain, Kessels, van der Meer, and Frank Schallmaier. ISBN 978-90-70478-38-4.
- Useful Photography 12. Amsterdam: KesselsKramer. Collected and edited by Aarsman, Germain, Kessels, and van der Meer. ISBN 978-90-70478-40-7.
- Useful Photography 13. Amsterdam: KesselsKramer. Collected and Edited by Aarsman, Germain, Kessels, and Schallmeier. ISBN 978-90-70478-43-8.
  - Useful Photography 13. Amsterdam: KesselsKramer. Boxed edition with remote control, batteries and ruler. ISBN 978-90-70478-43-8. Edition of 25 copies.
- Useful Photography War Special. Amsterdam: KesselsKramer. Collected and edited by Aarsman, de Cleen, Germain, Kessels, and van der Meer. ISBN 978-90-75380-84-2.
- Useful Photography: #001-005. Collected and edited by Aarsman, de Cleen, Germain, Kessels, and van der Meer. Issues 1–5 in a slipcase. Edition of 100 copies.

==== In Almost Every Picture ====
- In Almost Every Picture 1. Amsterdam: KesselsKramer, 2002. Collected and edited by Kessels. ISBN 978-90-75380-41-5. Text by Tyler Whisnand.
- In Almost Every Picture 2. Amsterdam: KesselsKramer, 2003. Collected and edited by Kessels and Andrea Stultiens. ISBN 978-90-75380-73-6. Text by Whisnand.
- In Almost Every Picture 3. Amsterdam: KesselsKramer, 2005. Collected and edited by Kessels. ISBN 978-90-8546-018-3. Text by Whisnand.
- In Almost Every Picture 4. Amsterdam: KesselsKramer, 2006. Collected and edited by Kessels. ISBN 978-90-70478-07-0. Text by Whisnand.
- In Almost Every Picture 5. Amsterdam: KesselsKramer. Collected and edited by Kessels and Marion Blomeyer. ISBN 978-90-70478-13-1. Text by Whisnand.
- In Almost Every Picture 6. Amsterdam: KesselsKramer, 2007. Collected and edited by Kessels. ISBN 978-90-70478-15-5. Text by Christian Bunyan.
- In Almost Every Picture 1–5. Collected and edited by Kessels, 2008. Five books in a slipcase. In Almost Every Picture 5 comes with a DVD containing a film of Josefina Aparicio Iglesias, the woman who is the subject of the book.
- In Almost Every Picture 7. Amsterdam: KesselsKramer, 2008. Collected and edited by Kessels and Joep Eijkens. ISBN 978-90-70478-23-0. Photographs by Ria van Dijk. Text by Joep Eijkens.
- In Almost Every Picture 8. Amsterdam: KesselsKramer, 2009. Collected and edited by Kessels. Photographs by Hironori Akutagawa. ISBN 978-90-70478-28-5. Text by Christian Bunyan.
- In Almost Every Picture 9. Amsterdam: KesselsKramer, 2010. Collected and edited by Kessels. Text by Christian Bunyan. ISBN 978-90-70478-31-5.
- In Almost Every Picture 10. Amsterdam: KesselsKramer, 2011. Collected by Michel Campeau. Edited and designed by Kessels. Photographs by Jean-Paul Cuerrier. ISBN 978-90-70478-35-3.
- In Almost Every Picture 6–10. Amsterdam: KesselsKramer, 2011. Collected and edited by Kessels. Five books in a slipcase. In Almost Every Picture 6 includes a DVD containing a music piece composed by Scanner, and images from the book. Edition of 100 copies.
- In Almost Every Picture 11. Amsterdam: KesselsKramer, 2012. Discovered by Gijs van den Berg. Edited and designed by Kessels. Photographs by Fred Clark. ISBN 978-90-70478-36-0.
- In Almost Every Picture 12. Amsterdam: KesselsKramer, 2013. Edited and designed by Kessels. ISBN 978-90-70478-37-7.
- In Almost Every Picture 13. Amsterdam: KesselsKramer, 2014. Edited and designed by Kessels. ISBN 978-90-70478-39-1
- In Almost Every Picture 14. Amsterdam: KesselsKramer, 2015. Discovered by Toon Michiels. Edited and designed by Kessels. ISBN 978-90-70478-41-4.

=== Publications with contributions by Kessels ===
- Daido Moriyama – Journey For Something. Reflex Amsterdam, 2012. ISBN 978-9071848148. Photographs by Daidō Moriyama. With essays in english by Kessels and Matthias Harder.
- (Mis) Understanding Photography: Werks und Manifeste. = Works and Manifestos. Essen, Germany: Museum Folkwang; Göttingen: Steidl, 2014. ISBN 978-3869307640. Photographs by various photographers, short texts, and introductions to each photographer written by themselves, in German. Includes examples of Kessels' Mother Nature: Photo's [sic] of Females Flourishing (2014). Catalogue of an exhibition held at Museum Folkwang.
- Photobook Phenomenon. Munich: Prestel; CCCB/RM/Fundació Foto Colectania, 2017. A box set of eight booklets of writing, one each by Moritz Neumüller and Lesley Martin, Markus Schaden and Frederic Lezmi, Martin Parr, Horacio Fernández, Ryuichi Kaneko, Gerry Badger, Kessels ("Fascinations and Failures"), and Irene de Mendoza and Neumüller. ISBN 978-8417047054.

== Film by Kessels ==
- Loud & Clear: Ryuichi Sakamoto, Marlene Dumas, Erik Kessels/KesselsKramer. Loud & Clear 3. Amsterdam: Bifrons Foundation, 2002. OCLC 611276622. DVD. Includes My Daughter by Marlene Dumas, with music by Ryuichi Sakamoto (3:20) and My Sister by Kessels, with music by Sakamoto. Made for Baltic Centre for Contemporary Art, Gateshead, England.

== Exhibitions (selected) ==
- My Sister short film shown alongside Marlene Dumas' My Daughter, Baltic Centre for Contemporary Art, Gateshead, England.
- Photography in Abundance, What's Next, Foam Fotografiemuseum Amsterdam, Amsterdam, 2011
- Five Strange Family Albums: Alessandra Sanguinetti/ Emmet Gowin/ Erik Kessels/ Ralph Eugene Meatyard/ Sadie Benning, Le Bal, Paris, January–April 2011. Included My Sister by Kessels, The Clearest Pictures were at First Strange (1965–1973) by Emmet Gowin, The Family Album of Lucybelle Crater (1970–1972) by Ralph Eugene Meatyard, Flat is Beautiful (1998) by Sadie Benning, and The Adventures of Guille and Belinda and the Enigmatic Meaning of their Dreams (1999–2010) by Alessandra Sanguinetti.
- Album Beauty, Foam Fotografiemuseum Amsterdam, Amsterdam, 2012. Single images from family albums, through which he tries to show how people behave in albums.
- Sky Arts Ignition: Memory Palace, Victoria and Albert Museum, London, June–October 2013. Included a piece of sculpture by Kessels, as well as work by [Peter Bil’ak, Hansje van Halem, Na Kim, Frank Laws, Henning Wagenbreth, and others.
- (Mis) Understanding Photography: Werks und Manifeste, Museum Folkwang, Essen, Germany, June–August 2014. Photographs by various photographers including examples of Kessels' Mother Nature: Photo's [sic] of Females Flourishing.
- Unfinished Father, Fotografia Europea international festival, Reggio Emilia, Italy, May 2015
- Deutsche Börse Photography Foundation Prize 2016, included Kessels' Unfinished Father, The Photographers' Gallery, London, April–July 2016. Deutsche Börse Photography Prize shortlist with Kessels, Laura El-Tantawy, Trevor Paglen and Tobias Zielony.
- Destroy My Face, Skatehal Pier15, part of BredaPhoto 2020, Breda (2020). After criticism, was taken offline.

== Collections ==
Kessels' work is held in the following public collection:

- Stedelijk Museum Amsterdam, Amsterdam, holds In Almost Every Picture 7

== See also ==
- The Other Final – a documentary film about a KesselsKramer project
