= Laura El-Tantawy =

British-Egyptian photographer (born 1980)

Laura El-Tantawy (born 1980) is a British-Egyptian photographer based in London and Cairo. She works as a freelance news photographer and on personal projects.

El-Tantawy was born in England to Egyptian parents and moved to Egypt as an infant, growing up between there, Saudi Arabia and the United States. Her website says her photography is "inspired by questions on her identity - exploring social and environmental issues pertaining to her background." In the Shadow of the Pyramids (2015) came about through "going back to Egypt to discover her roots, she became caught up in the momentous events in Tahir Square during 2011, and stayed to photograph the whole event."

In the Shadow of the Pyramids, was shortlisted for the Deutsche Börse Photography Prize in 2015. In 2020 El-Tantawy was joint winner of the W. Eugene Smith fund Grant, for I'll Die for You.

== Life and work ==
El-Tantawy was born in Worcestershire, England, in 1980 to Egyptian parents and grew up between Egypt, Saudi Arabia and the United States. She graduated from the University of Georgia in Athens, GA, in 2002 with dual degrees in journalism and political science. Also in 2002, she began working as a newspaper photographer with the Milwaukee Journal Sentinel and Sarasota Herald-Tribune. In 2006, she became a freelance photographer so she could work on personal projects. She completed a research fellowship at the University of Oxford in 2009, and gained an MA in art and media practice from the University of Westminster, London, in 2011.

In 2015 El-Tantawy self-published her first book, In the Shadow of the Pyramids. Partly supported by Burn magazine and a crowdfunding campaign, it is centered on the Egyptian Revolution of 2011. Creative Review described it as "close-up photographs of protestors and street scenes of fervent crowds in Cairo during the January revolution in Tahrir Square, are mixed in with local witness accounts, alongside old family photographs from her childhood growing up between Egypt, Saudi Arabia and the US. Shot between 2005-2014, the series is a heady combination of documentary photography, portraits, and more dynamic, abstract images, jarring with the retro, candid shapshots." Gerry Badger, selecting the book for the Best Photobook prize at Fotobookfestival in Kassel (which it won), wrote "Her highly impressionistic style is in the best tradition of Japanese protest books, and captures he confusion of the event extremely well – where people where having picnics in the middle of the square while others were dying in the surrounding streets. At first glance, her brightly coloured, semi abstract images seem too ‘aesthetic’, but when you really get into and study the sequence, journeying from hope and exultation to near despair, the toughness of her vision becomes apparent, and the whole is brought together with excellent production values and a beautiful, yet not overinsistent design.

Her "I'll Die for You" series deals with suicide among rural Indian farmers.

El-Tantawy's website says her photography is "inspired by questions on her identity - exploring social and environmental issues pertaining to her background." She has also said her inspiration "primarily comes from music, poetry and impressionistic painters – my photographic influences tend to be poetic and painterly like, such as the work of Gueorgui Pinkhassov, Miguel Rio Branco and Saul Leiter."

== Publications ==
=== Publications by El-Tantawy ===
- In the Shadow of the Pyramids. Amsterdam: self-published, 2015. ISBN 978-90-821066-1-9. 440 pages. Edition of 500 copies.
- The People. Self-published, 2015. ISBN 978-0-9932876-0-2. Edition of 1500 copies.
  - The People Collector Edition. Self-published, 2015. Edition of 102 copies.
- Post-Script. Bristol, UK: RRB, 2016. ISBN 978-0-9932323-9-8. Edition of 750 copies. Photographs and text by El-Tantawy. Edited by Colin Pantall. Folding format.
- Beyond Here Is Nothing. Self-published, 2017. ISBN 978-0-9932876-1-9. Three interwoven volumes. Edition of 500 copies.
- A Star in the Sea. Self-published, 2019. ISBN 978-0-9932876-2-6. Edition of 150 copies.
- Pang'Ono Pang'Ono. Self-published, 2023. Edition of 500 copies.

=== Publications with contributions El-Tantawy ===
- The Other Hundred: 100 Faces, Places, Stories: Entrepreneurs. London: Oneworld Publications, 2015. Edited by Global Institute for Tomorrow. ISBN 978-1780747125. With a foreword by Chandran Nair, an introduction by Tash Aw, an afterword by Ian Johnson, and essays by Robyn Bargh, Eliane Brum, David Goldblatt, Tolu Ogunlesi, Yasmine El Rashidi, and Huang Wenhai. El-Tantawy contributes text and photograph(s) about a solar energy business in Egypt.

== Awards ==
- 2014: Reminders Photography Stronghold Grant, Reminders Photography Stronghold, Tokyo, for her "I'll Die for You" series
- 2015: Shortlisted, Deutsche Börse Photography Prize, along with Erik Kessels, Trevor Paglen, and Tobias Zielony.
- 2015: Winner, Best Photobooks 2015 – Public vote / Public Visitor’s Prize, Fotobookfestival, Kassel, Germany, for In the Shadow of the Pyramids
- 2020: Joint winner, W. Eugene Smith fund Grant, for I'll Die for You. The other winners were Andrés Cardona, Sabiha Çimen, Mariceu Erthal García, and Yuki Iwanami.

== Exhibitions ==
- In the Shadow of the Pyramids, Pitt Rivers Museum, Photography Oxford Festival 14, Oxford, England, September–October 2014
- I'll Die For You, London
- Deutsche Börse Photography Foundation Prize 2016 included El-Tantawy's In the Shadow of the Pyramids, The Photographers' Gallery, London, April–July 2016. Work by the Deutsche Börse Photography Prize shortlist also with Trevor Paglen, Erik Kessels, and Tobias Zielony. An installation of El-Tantawy's project using projected photographs, prints in light boxes, sound recordings and the book In the Shadow of the Pyramids.
