= Snapshot (photography) =

Photograph taken quickly and spontaneously

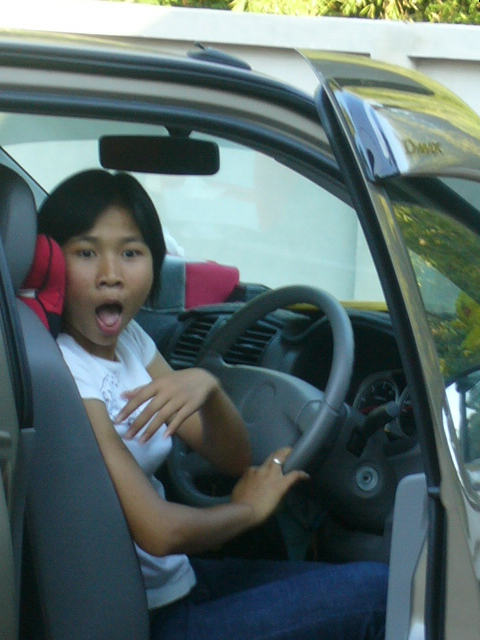
A snapshot may be taken when the subject is not expecting it

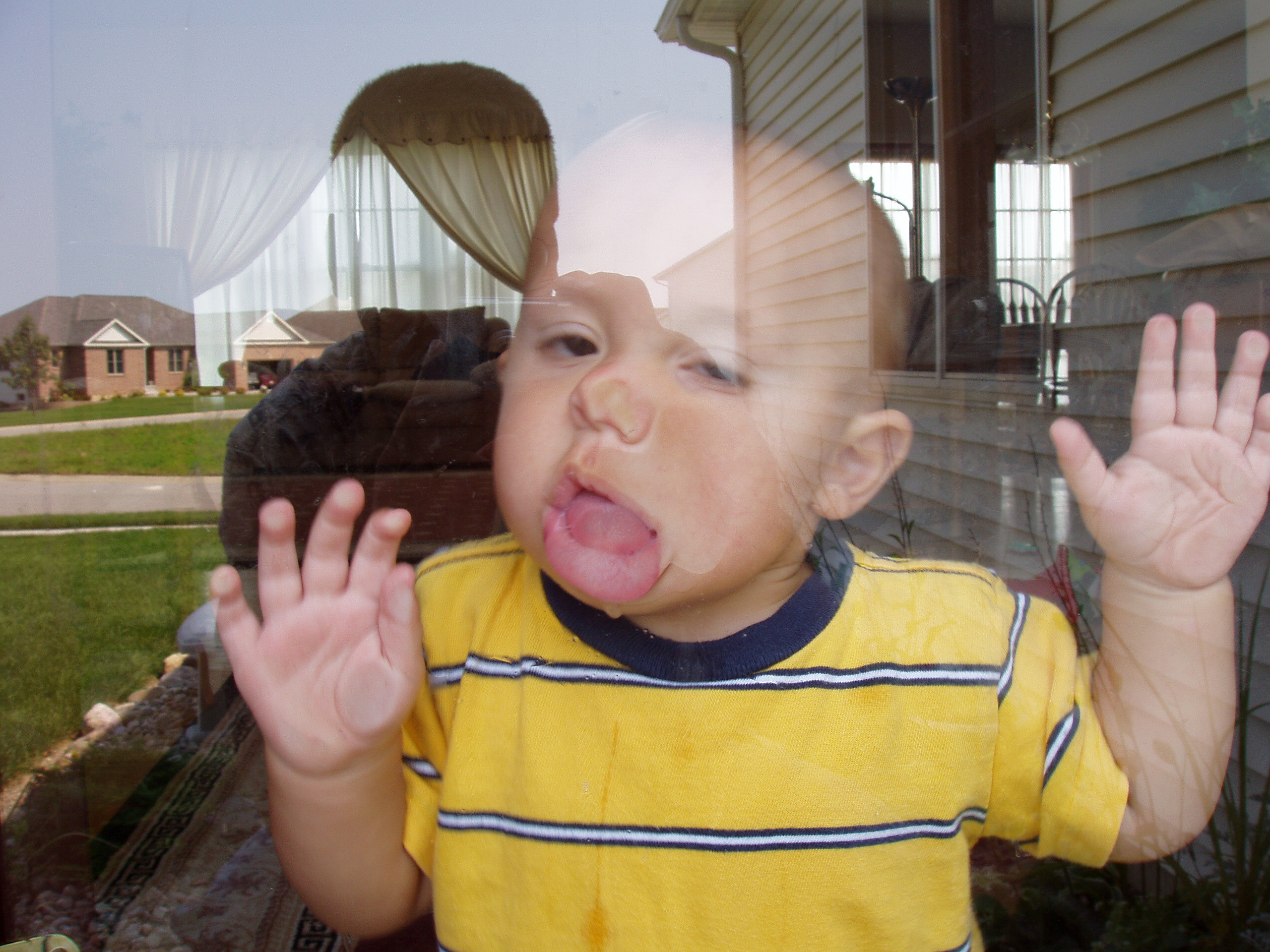
Snapshots render memorable moments in imperfect images. Here, glare exposes the photographer and implies a close and familiar relationship to the subject.

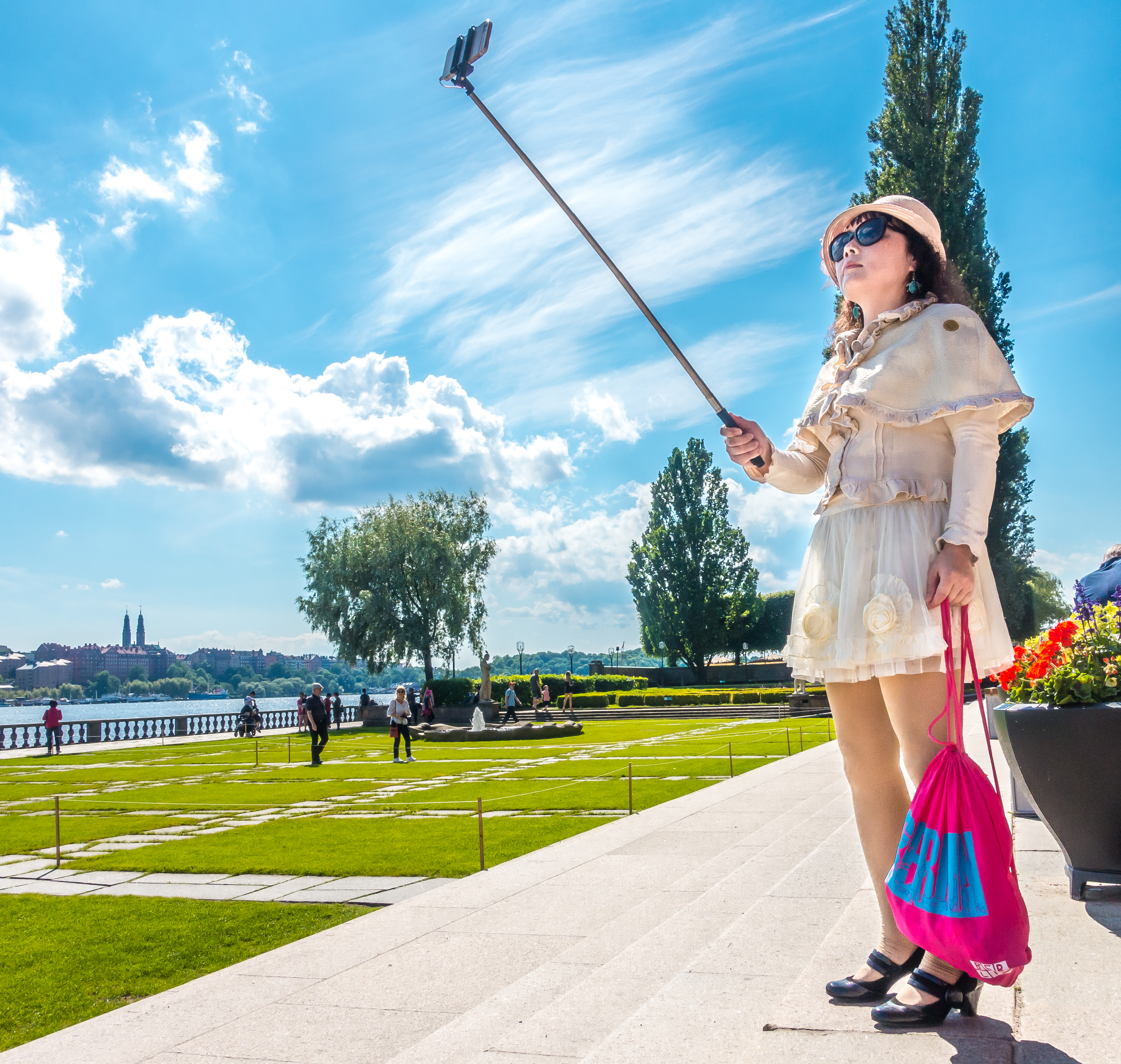
Snapshot of a tourist taking a selfie.

A snapshot is a photograph that is "shot" spontaneously and quickly, most often without artistic or journalistic intent and usually made with a relatively cheap and compact camera.

Common snapshot subjects include the events of everyday life, often portraying family members, friends, pets, children playing, birthday parties and other celebrations, sunsets, tourist attractions and the like.

Snapshots can be technically "imperfect" or amateurish: poorly framed or composed, out of focus, and/or inappropriately lighted by flash. Automated settings in consumer cameras have helped to obtain a technologically balanced quality in snapshots. Use of such settings can reveal the lack of expert choices that would entail more control of the focus point and shallower depth of field to achieve more pleasing images by making the subject stand out against a blurred background.

Snapshot photography can be considered the purest form of photography in providing images with the characteristics that distinguish photography from other visual media — its ubiquity, instantaneity, multiplicity and verisimilitude.

== History ==
When photography was introduced in 1839, exposure times took several minutes. To obtain a reasonably clear image, the camera could not be handheld and the photographer looked through the back of the camera under a black cloth before loading a sensitive plate, while the subjects had to stay totally still. Special head-rests and arm-rests could be used, and even if a subject managed to stay comfortable under these circumstances, they had to try to keep their facial expression in check if they wanted their features to properly show on the picture. This made it impossible to capture any spontaneity. During the following decades, many kinds of improvements —such as increased light-sensitivity of emulsions, quicker lenses and automatic shutters— were developed by experimental photographers who hoped to capture sharp details that would previously get smeared by motion blur. A more natural expression in portraiture was considered a priority, while others desired to be able to photograph atmospheric details in landscapes.

=== Instantaneous photography ===
In the 1850s, more and more examples of "instantaneous photography" started to appear. Many of the early pioneers were not necessarily ambitious fine artists, but could also be amateurs, or commercial photographers catering to a public that mostly fancied affordable small formats, such as cabinet cards and stereo views. Subjects often reflected popular recreational activities of the time. As spending time at the beach had become a favorite pastime in pioneering countries France and England, seashore views became a very popular topic and the clarity of waves in such pictures provide an indication of the duration of the exposure. A very early example is a seaside view at Boulogne-sur-Mer by Edmond Bacot, made with the albumen glass negative technique in May 1850 (probably). The experimental process rendered many waves as an undefined white area in a picture with relatively high contrast. John Dillwyn Llewelyn exhibited several early instantaneous pictures of the seaside, in London in 1854 and at the Exposition Universelle in Paris in 1855. These were well-received by critics, with detailed analysis of how well the waves were pictured. Llewelyn probably was an early adopter of the use of an automatic shutter, but it's uncertain when he would have started this practice.

Exposure times for instantaneous photography were generally understood to be one second or less, but the term lacked a set definition and some would even claim their photographs exposed for up to 30 seconds could be called instantaneous.

Thomas Skaife realised that smaller lenses and smaller photographs needed smaller exposure times and developed his small "Pistolgraph" camera accordingly in 1859. By the end of the year, he claimed that he and his pupils had made some 500 pictures using the hand-held camera with spring-shutters. The tiny "pistolgrams" could best be viewed with a magnifying glass, but it was also possible to make enlargements (an uncommon practice at the time), hundreds of times the size of the original, with sufficient sharpness. A broche-sized original "chromo-crystal" example depicting three children was praised by the Brighton Herald: "the laughing, mocking eye of the pet in the centre is, indeed, a photographic triumph, and the characters of the two others are unmistakeably stamped upon their features."

In 1860, John Herschel wrote about "the possibility of taking a photograph, as it were, by a snap-shot — of securing a picture in a tenth of a second of time". Herschel believed this was already possible at the time, or otherwise would soon be. He also took for granted that this was just one step away from the realization of stereoscopic motion pictures.

In March 1878, at a meeting of the South London Photographic Society, amateur photographer Charles Harper Bennett showed several surprising pictures made with dry gelatin silver process plates, which he would heat for up to seven days to increase the sensitivity. "Boat scene on river, exposure by drop-shutter—say twentieth of a second" demonstrated the rapidity of this improved process. The plates were also much easier to handle, ensuring that the formula was picked up by several big commercial photographic plate companies within weeks after Bennett published the formula. It soon became more popular than the wet-plate collodion process.

On 15 June 1878, Eadweard Muybridge recorded the different phases of the trotting and galloping of race horses at top speed, as assigned by Leland Stanford. Because a heavily retouched single picture from 1877 had been received with much suspicion, members of the press were invited to witness the event, resulting in extensive coverage of the successful experiments in the newspapers. The photographs were published as cabinet cards entitled The Horse in Motion and also featured in popular science magazines, including Scientific American and La Nature.

=== Kodak influence ===
The snapshot concept was introduced to the public at large by Eastman Kodak, which introduced the Brownie box camera in 1900, priced at $1 each. Initially marketed to children, it soon became popular among middle-class family members, in the years following its introduction, informal snapshots became a common form of photography. Over time, photographic activity increased, and so did interest in exchanging photographs. Picture postcards allowed the general public to share images of their surroundings and write their experience in a short written messages on the picture. Kodak encouraged families to use the Brownie to capture moments in time and to shoot photos without being concerned with producing perfect images. Kodak advertising urged consumers to "celebrate the moments of your life" and find a "Kodak moment".

=== Polaroid cameras ===
Instant cameras, that would develop and fix a picture immediately after shooting it, were developed and successfully marketed by Edwin H. Land's Polaroid Corporation since 1948. Several other companies followed the example. At the time, most other cameras would produce a negative that had to be developed and fixed with chemicals, and then reproduced as enlarged prints in dark rooms or laboratories.

Many professional photographers and filmmakers used the technique as quick test and reference material before engaging in the more time-consuming definitive production of their work, of which results could only be viewed much later. Instant cameras also had some success on the consumer market, but never became as widely used by amateurs as the cheaper systems with negative film rolls.

=== Snapshot aesthetic ===
An early theorist of snapshot aesthetic was the Austrian architectural critic, Joseph August Lux, who in 1908 wrote a book called Künstlerische Kodakgeheimnisse (Artistic Secrets of the Kodak) in which he championed the use of Kodak cameras like the Brownie. Guided by a position that was influenced by the Catholic critique of modernity, he argued that the ease of use of the camera meant that people could photograph and document their surroundings and thus produce, what he hoped, was a type of stability in the ebb and flow of the modern world.

The term 'snapshot aesthetic' arose with a trend within fine art photography in the USA from around 1963. The style typically features apparently banal everyday subject matter and off-centered framing. Subject matter is often presented without apparent link from image-to-image and relying instead on juxtaposition and disjunction between individual photographs.

The originator of the American trend was Robert Frank, with his book of photographs, The Americans, published in 1958.

The snapshot tendency was promoted by John Szarkowski, who was head of the photography department at the Museum of Modern Art from 1962 to 1991, and it became especially fashionable from the late 1970s until the mid-1980s. Notable practitioners include Garry Winogrand, Nan Goldin, Wolfgang Tillmans, Martin Parr, William Eggleston, and Terry Richardson. In contrast with photographers like W. Eugene Smith and Gordon Parks, these photographers aimed "not to reform life, but to know it." Frank has said "I was tired of romanticism, [ . . . ] I wanted to present what I saw, pure and simple." Szarkowski brought to prominence the work of Diane Arbus, Lee Friedlander and Garry Winogrand in his influential exhibition "New Documents" at the Museum of Modern Art in 1967, in which he identified a new trend in photography: pictures that seemed to have a casual, snapshot-like look and had subject matter that seemed strikingly ordinary. Winogrand has said "When I'm photographing, I see life, [ . . . ] That's what I deal with. I don't have pictures in my head… I don't worry about how the picture is going to look. I let that take care of itself… It's not about making a nice picture. That anyone can do."

Later photographers such as Daidō Moriyama, Hiromix, Ryan McGinley, Miko Lim, and Arnis Balcus gained international recognition thanks to the snapshot aesthetic. From the early 1990s the style became the predominant mode in fashion photography, especially within youth fashion magazines such as The Face and photography from this era is often associated with the so-called 'heroin chic' look (a look often seen as having been influenced particularly by Nan Goldin).

The term arose from the fascination of artists with the "classical" black-and-white vernacular snapshot, the characteristics of which were: 1) they were made with a hand-held camera on which the viewfinder could not easily 'see' the edges of the frame, unlike modern cheap digital cameras with electronic viewfinder, and so the subject had to be centred; and 2) they were made by ordinary people recording the ceremonies of their lives and the places that they lived and visited.

=== 21st century: camera phone photography ===
The tradition of increasingly automating the "snapshot camera" continues with inexpensive point-and-shoot digital cameras and camera phones that fully automate flash, film speed, focus, shutter speed, and many other functions that ensure balanced quality in the results. Since the 2010s, even visual effects could easily be added real-time with software based on augmented reality technology, for instance with filters in Snapchat.

Camera phones that are usually kept within reach for most of the day have made taking, sharing, and publishing snapshots an everyday practice for people.

Camera phone photography has evolved from casual snapshots to a recognized art form.

== See also ==
- Candid photography
- Vernacular photography
