= Sauvin =

Sauvin is a surname. Notable people with the surname include:

- Guy Sauvin (born 1942), French karateka
- Thomas Sauvin (born 1983), French photography collector and editor
