= Thomas Sauvin =

French photography collector and editor

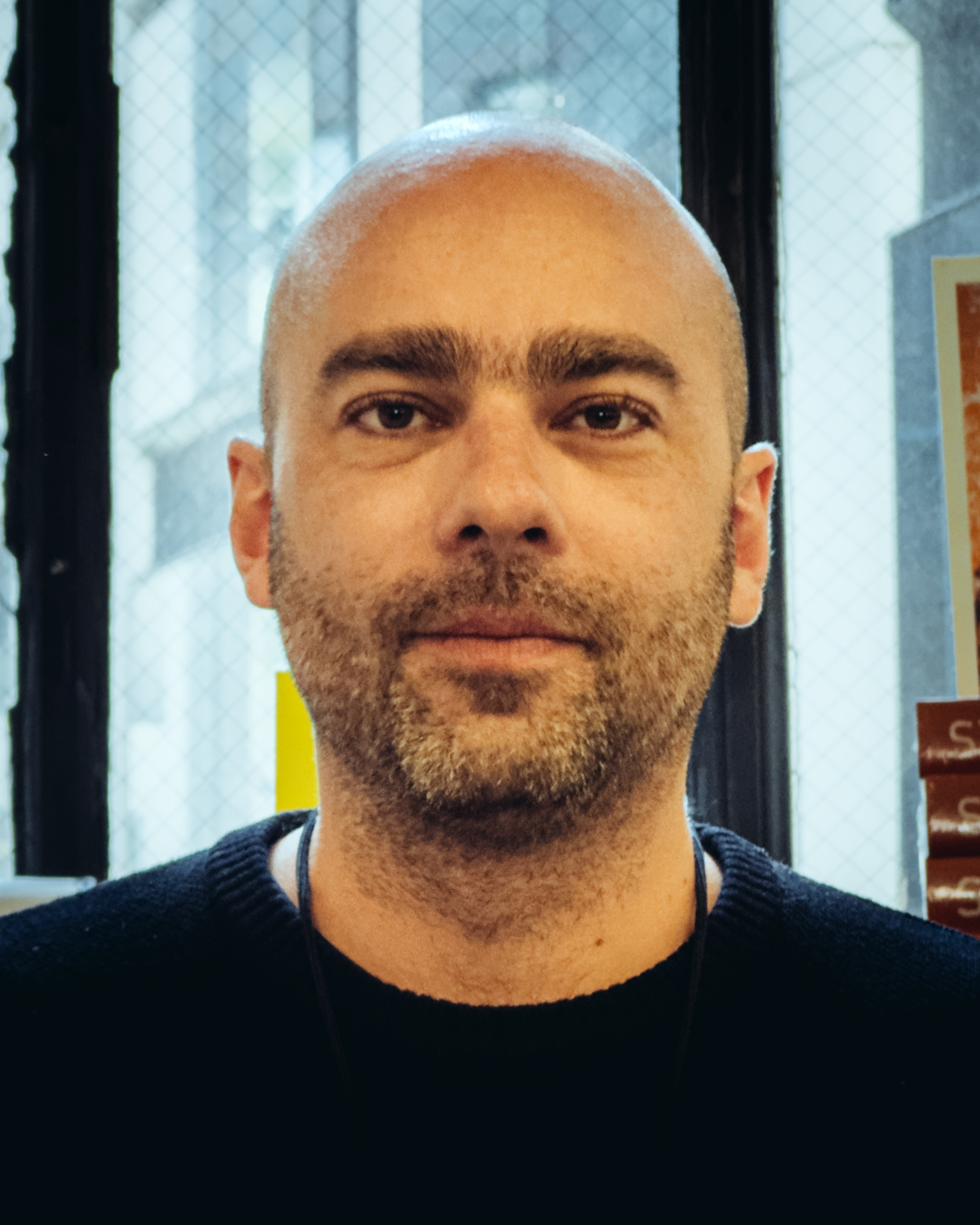
- Sauvin in 2024
- Born: 1983 (age 42–43); Paris, France
- Known for: Photography collecting, vernacular photography, Beijing Silvermine
- Notable work: Beijing Silvermine; Until Death Do Us Part; No More, No Less (with Kensuke Koike); Me TV (with Erik Kessels); Recycle (with Lei Lei)
- Style: Vernacular photography, found photography
- Awards: Shortlisted for Paris Photo–Aperture Foundation First Photobook Award (2013) for Silvermine; Nominated for Deutsche Börse Photography Prize (2014) for Silvermine
- Website: www.beijingsilvermine.com

Thomas Sauvin is a French photography collector and editor who lives in Beijing. Since 2006 he exclusively works as a consultant for the UK-based Archive of Modern Conflict, an independent archive and publisher, for whom he collects Chinese works, from contemporary photography to period publications to anonymous photography. Sauvin has had exhibitions of his work, and published through Archive of Modern Conflict.

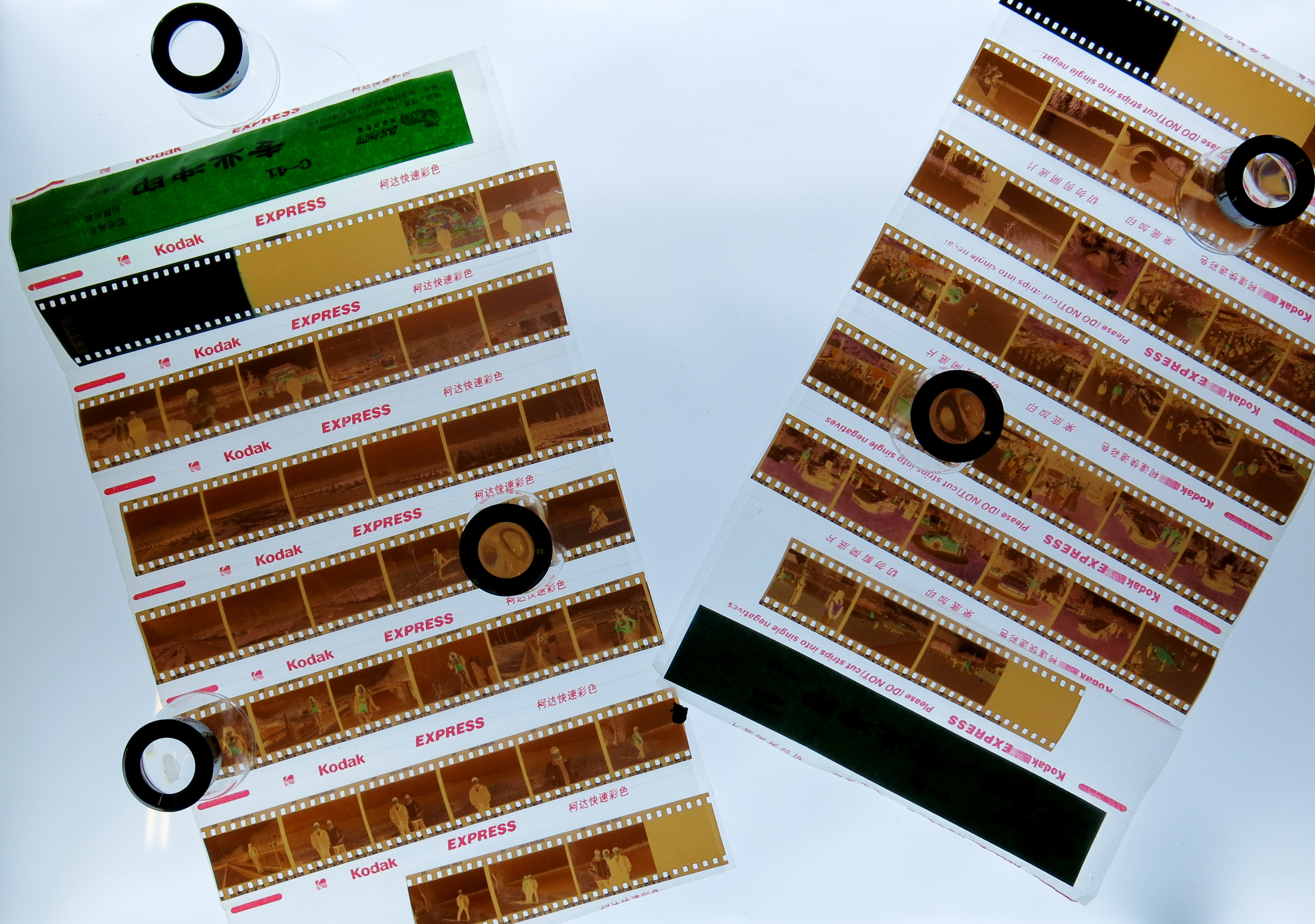
Negatives for Sauvin's Beijing Silvermine project

== Beijing Silvermine ==
Sauvin started the Beijing Silvermine project, accumulating more than 850,000 anonymous color negatives (as of December 2019) destined for destruction in a Beijing recycling zone. It covers a period of 20 years, from 1985, namely when photographic film (which contains microscopically small light-sensitive silver halide crystals) started being used massively in China, to 2005, when digital photography started taking over. This period is the beginning of the reform and opening up.

== Publications ==
=== Publications by Sauvin ===
- Thomas Sauvin: Silvermine. London: Archive of Modern Conflict, 2013. ISBN 978-0-9570490-1-7. Five albums each containing 20 prints. Edition of 200 copies.
- Amc2 Journal Issue 8: Quanshen. London: Archive of Modern Conflict, 2013. Photographs collected and edited by Sauvin.
- Silvermine albums. London: Archive of Modern Conflict, 2013. ISBN 978-0-9570490-1-7. Five albums each containing 20 prints. Edition of 200 copies.
- METV. Self-published, 2014. With Erik Kessels.
- Until Death Do Us Part. Jiazazhi, 2015. First edition of 1000 copies; fourth edition of 2000 copies; third edition of 2000 copies; fourth edition of 2000 copies.
- Xian. Self-published, 2016. Handmade book, composed of fifty-nine paper boxes made of black folded paper, 90 facsimiles of vintage prints. Edition of 200 copies.
- No More No Less. With Koike. (M); Skinnerboox; Jiazazhi, 2018. Edition of 400 copies.
- Six. 2018. Set of 3 Softcover postcard booklets.
- MeNu. London: Archive of Modern Conflict; Galerie Ben Alors. Edited by Ruben Lundgren and Timothy Prus. Edition of 300 copies.
- Great Leaps Forward. Silvermine, 2019. ISBN 978-2-9570118-0-3. Edition of 750 copies.
- 17 18 19. Athens: Void, 2019. Edition of 750 copies.

=== Publications with contributions by Sauvin ===
- Happy Tonite. London: Archive of Modern Conflict, 2010. Edited by Ed Jones and James Welch. ISBN 978-0-9547091-6-7. Edition of 1000 copies. Photographs selected by Ed Jones and James Welch from the collection of Chinese photography assembled by Sauvin. Includes the work of Liu YiQing, Cai Hongshuo, Chang He, Zeng Han, Yang Changhong, Bai Chuan, Dustin Shum, Chang Qing, Fang Er, Feng Li, Luo Dan and Jiang Yiming.
- The Chinese Photobook. New York: Aperture, 2015. Edited by Martin Parr and WassinkLundgren. ISBN 978-1-59711-228-4; Mid-Sized Edition, 2016, ISBN 978-1-59711-375-5. With texts by Gu Zheng, Raymond Lum, Ruben Lundgren, Stephanie H. Tung, and Gerry Badger.

== Exhibitions ==
- 2010: Dali International Photography Festival, China.
- 2012: Open City Museum, Brixen, Austria
- 2012: Singapore International Photography Festival, Singapore.
- 2013: Format International Photography Festival, Derby, UK.
