= WassinkLundgren =

Dutch photographer duo

- Born: Wassink: September 11, 1981 (age 45), Deventer, The Netherlands; Lundgren: June 9, 1983 (age 43), Hilversum, The Netherlands
- Known for: Photography, Conceptual art
- Awards: Prix du Livre for Best Contemporary Photobook

Thijs groot Wassink (born 1981) and Ruben Lundgren (born 1983) are two Dutch photographers who work together as WassinkLundgren. Their photography and film projects shift mundane, often unnoticeable, everyday occurrences into visually compelling and gently amusing observations of the world around us.

Notable projects include Empty Bottles (2007), Tokyo Tokyo (2010) and This Land is Your Land, This Land is My Land (2012). They also worked as editors and curators on The Chinese Photobook (2015).

Thijs groot Wassink lives in London while Ruben Lundgren lives in Beijing.

== Career ==
The duo met at the Utrecht School of the Arts from whose photography department they graduated in 2005. Their first collaborative publication Is Still Searching was given away, but not until the duo had torn out the pages that were no longer relevant to them at that moment. Their next publication Empty Bottles (2007) won the Prix du Livre for Best Contemporary Photobook at Rencontres d'Arles and is included in The Photobook: A History Volume III by Martin Parr and Gerry Badger.

From 2007 to 2008 Thijs groot Wassink studied Fine Arts (MA) at Central Saint Martins in London. Ruben Lundgren studied photographic design (MA) at the Central Academy of Fine Arts in Beijing from 2007 to 2011. They have worked with the Archive of Modern Conflict on the photobooks Don't Smile Now... Save it for Later! (2008) and Tokyo Tokyo (2010). In 2011 the latter was nominated for the Dutch Doc Award, an annual award for the best Dutch documentary work of the year. In their series This Land is Your Land, This Land is My Land (2012) they document the most expensive part of the Netherlands, the financial district called the Zuidas. By doing so, they challenge our expectations of land, value, and the value of land.

Their work is often described as playful and inventive. Sean O'Hagan, photography critic for The Guardian, talks about their shared instinct for often freeform exploration: the willingness to follow an idea where it leads, not in order to exhaust it, but simply to see where it leads".

Together with Martin Parr they worked as editors and curators on The Chinese Photobook (2015), which tells the history of China from 1900 up to the present in photography books.

== Books ==
=== Monographs ===
- Is Still Searching. Self-published, 2006.
- Empty Bottles. Veenman, 2007. With texts by Hans Moleman and Floris-Jan van Luyn.
- Don't smile now... Save it for Later! London: Archive of Modern Conflict, 2008.
- Portfolio, Click to Add Subtitle. London: Blurb, 2009. With text by Martin Parr.
- Lu Xiaoben. Beijing: Badger and Press, 2010.
- Tokyo Tokyo. Baden, Switzerland: Kodoji in association with Archive of Modern Conflict, 2010.
- Aaaaaaao~. Beijing: Badger and Press, 2011.
- Hits. Amsterdam: Fw:Books, 2013. With contributions by Sean O'Hagan, Bohm/Kobayashi, Merel Bem, Diane Smyth, dewham5, Tom Claxton, Michiel Goudswaard and others.

=== Books edited ===
- The Chinese Photobook. New York: Aperture, 2015. With Martin Parr. With text by Gu Zheng, Stephanie Tung, Raymund Lum, Gerry Badger and Ruben Lundgren.

== Exhibitions ==
- 2008/2009: ParrWorld, touring exhibition, Haus der Kunst, Munich, 2008; Breda Design Museum, The Netherlands, 2008; Galerie nationale du Jeu de Paume, Paris, 2009; Baltic, Gateshead, UK, 2009.
- 2011: Other I:, Hotshoe Gallery, London, with Alec Soth and Viviane Sassen, curated by Aaron Schuman.
- 2013: Don't Smile Now... Save it for Later!, MAI (Montréal, Arts Interculturels), as part of Mois de la Photo à Montréal, with Tomoko Sawada.
- 2013: One Group Show (solo), Foam Fotografiemuseum Amsterdam.
- 2015: The Chinese Photobook, Ullens Center for Contemporary Art, Beijing, China.
- 2015: The Chinese Photobook, The Photographers' Gallery, London.

== Collections ==
WassinkLundgren's work is held in the following public collections:

- Stedelijk Museum Amsterdam, Amsterdam.
- Fotomuseum Winterthur, Winterthur, Switzerland.
