= Gelatin silver print =

Photographic process

The gelatin silver print or dry plate gelatin process is the most commonly used chemical process in black-and-white photography, and is the fundamental chemical process for modern analog color photography. As such, films and printing papers available for analog photography rarely rely on any other chemical process to record an image. A suspension of silver salts in gelatin is coated onto a support such as glass, flexible plastic or film, baryta paper, or resin-coated paper. These light-sensitive materials are stable under normal keeping conditions and are able to be exposed and processed even many years after their manufacture. The "dry plate" gelatin process was an improvement on the collodion wet-plate process dominant from the 1850s–1880s, which had to be exposed and developed immediately after coating.

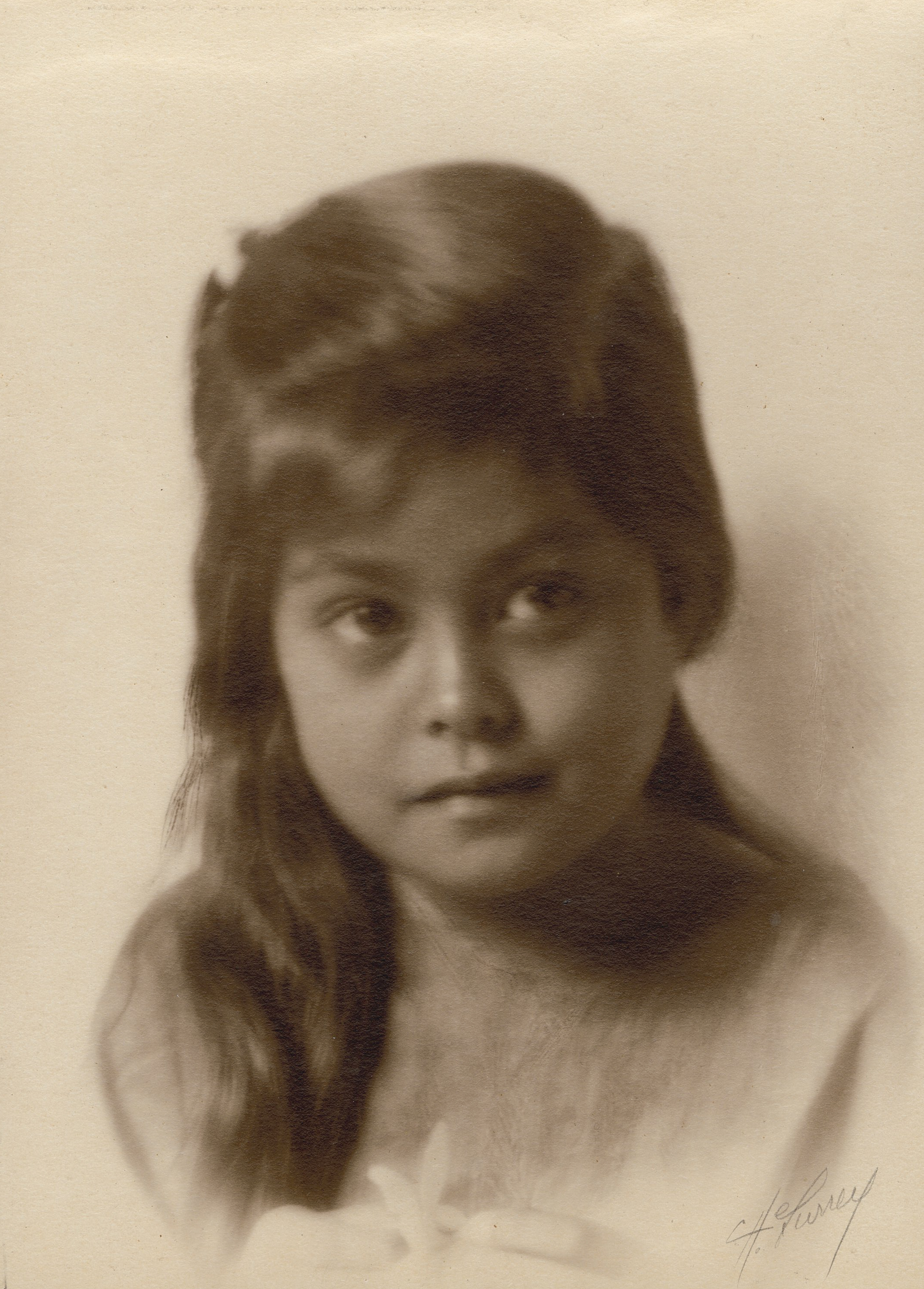
A gelatin silver print of a Hawaiian girl

== History ==
Gelatine was used to copy the images of Daguerreotypes by 1845 and Alphonse Louis Poitevin wrote about positive proofs of negatives on dry gelatine plates in 1850.

In the 1860s, the dry plate collodion process (with gelatin or albumen) was described as advantageous for outdoor photography, especially when multiple shots in different places were required, or when there was little time. Negatives taken during summer outings could wait until the long winter evenings to be developed, fixed and printed. Exposure times were long compared to the wet process, but that required much more time to prepare a plate before exposure, to develop, fix and wash the negative soon after, with chemicals and a portable dark room that had to be dragged around and installed.

The introduction of the gelatin silver process is commonly attributed to Richard Leach Maddox, author of the 1871 article An Experiment with Gelatino-Bromide.

In 1873, Charles Harper Bennett discovered a method of hardening the emulsion, making it more resistant to friction. In 1878, Bennett discovered that by prolonged heating, the sensitivity of the emulsion could be greatly increased. While dry plate processes could previous only be used with long exposures, Bennett's plates contributed much to instantaneous photography turning into a very common practice.

George Eastman developed a machine to coat glass plates in 1879 and founded the Eastman Film and Dry Plate Company in 1881.

William de Wiveleslie Abney and Josef Maria Eder improved the formula with silver chloride.

Gelatin silver print paper was made as early as 1874 on a commercial basis, but it was poor quality because the dry-plate emulsion was coated onto the paper only as an afterthought. Coating machines for the production of continuous rolls of sensitized paper were in use by the mid-1880s, though widespread adoption of gelatin silver print materials did not occur until the 1890s. The earliest papers had no baryta layer, and it was not until the 1890s that baryta coating became a commercial operation, first in Germany, in 1894, and then taken up by Kodak by 1900.

Although the baryta layer plays an important part in the manufacture of smooth and glossy prints, the baryta paper of the 1890s did not produce the lustrous or glossy print surface that became the standard for fine art photography in the twentieth century. Matting agents, textured papers, and thin baryta layers that were not heavily calendering produced a low-gloss and textured appearance. The higher gloss papers first became popular in the 1920s and 1930s as photography transitioned from pictorialism into modernism, photojournalism, and "straight" photography.

Research over the last 125 years has led to current materials that exhibit low grain and high sensitivity to light.

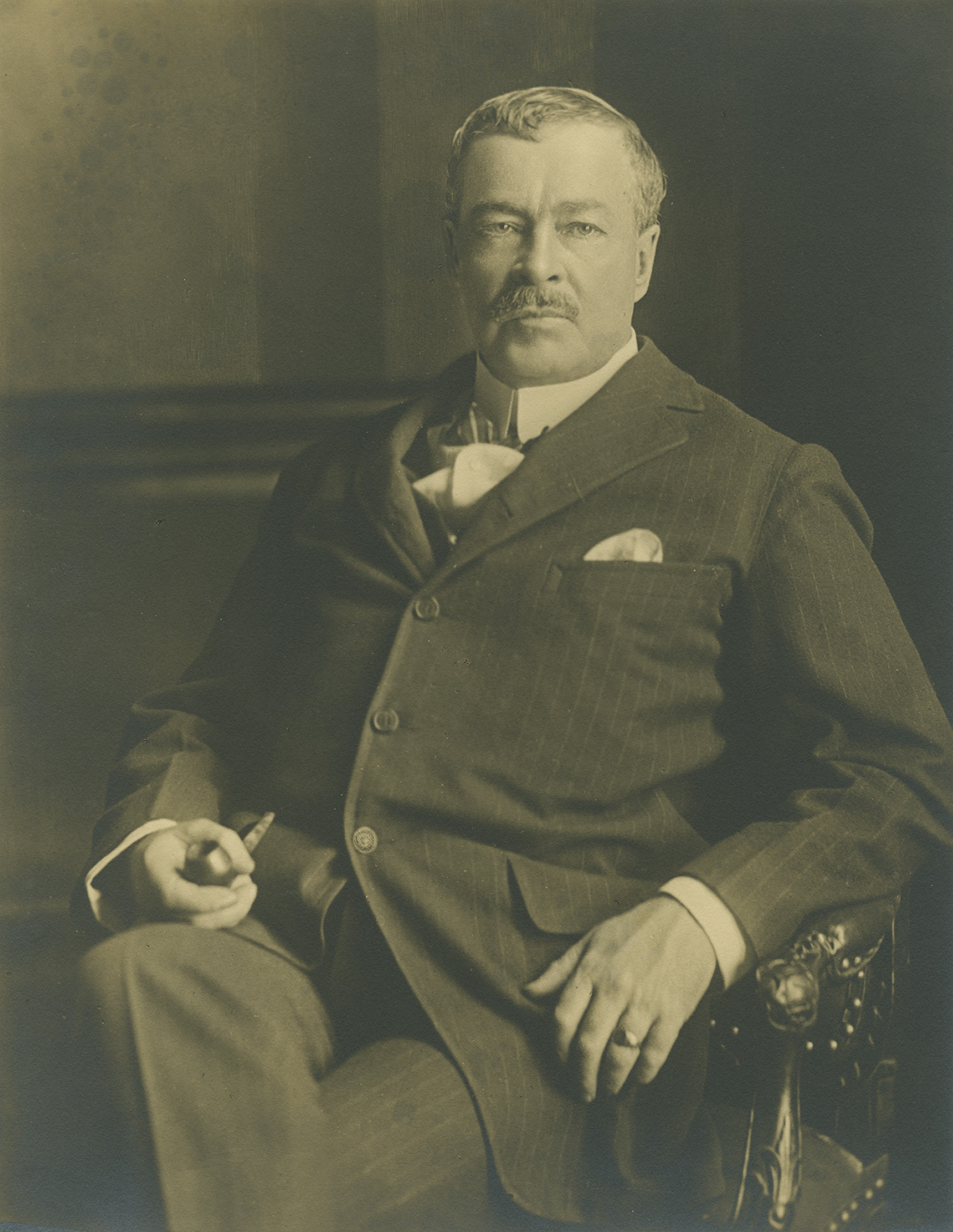
Childe Hassam by James W. Porter, 1913, silver print

=== Timeline ===
- 1874 – First commercial production of gelatin developing out paper (DOP)
- 1885 – Coating machines first used in gelatin DOP manufacture for manufacture of continuous rolls
- 1894 – Baryta layer added to commercial gelatin DOP manufacture
- 1920s – Increasing popularity of glossy and semi-gloss papers
- 1960s – Color photography eclipses black and white for the first time

== Technology ==
=== Overview ===
The gelatin silver print or gelatin developing out paper (DOP) is a monochrome imaging process based on the light sensitivity of silver halides. They have been made for both contact printing and enlarging purposes by modifying the paper's light sensitivity. A brief exposure to a negative produces a latent image, which is then made visible by a developing agent. The image is then made permanent by treatment in a photographic fixer, which removes the remaining light sensitive silver halides. And finally, a water bath clears the fixer from the print. The final image consists of small particles of silver bound in a layer of gelatin. This gelatin image layer is only one of the four layers found in a typical gelatin silver print, which typically include the overcoat, image layer, baryta, and paper support.

=== Layer structure ===
A gelatin silver print is composed of four layers: paper base, baryta, gelatin binder, and a protective gelatin layer or overcoat. The multi-layer structure of the gelatin silver print and the sensitivity of the silver imaging salts require specialized coating equipment and fastidious manufacturing technique to produce a consistent product that is free of impurities harmful to the image.

The paper base or support serves as the substrate onto which the subsequent layers are attached. Paper is in many ways an ideal support: it is lightweight, flexible, and strong enough to withstand both wet processing and regular handling. The photographic paper base must be free of photoactive impurities such as iron and lignins. In order to obtain this purity, the paper was originally made from cotton rags, though after World War I there was a transition to purified wood pulp, which has been used ever since.

The second layer is the baryta, a white opaque coating made primarily from gelatin and barium sulfate. Its purpose is to cover the paper fibers and form a smooth surface upon which to coat the gelatin. Surface textures are created by a variety of textured felts used in the drying of the paper, calendaring, and embossing before or after application of the baryta layer depending on the desired effect.

The third layer is the gelatin binder that holds the silver grains of the photographic image. Gelatin has many qualities that make it an ideal photographic binder. Among these are toughness and abrasion resistance when dry and its ability to swell and allow the penetration of processing solutions. The fourth layer, called the overcoat, supercoat, or topcoat, is a very thin layer of hardened gelatin that is applied on top of the gelatin binder. It acts as a protective layer, providing superior abrasion resistance to the print surface.

=== Image and processing ===
Before a paper is exposed, the image layer is a clear gelatin matrix holding the light-sensitive silver halides. For gelatin silver prints, these silver halides are typically combinations of silver bromide and silver chloride. Exposure to a negative is typically done with an enlarger, although contact printing was also popular, particularly among amateurs in the early twentieth century and among users of large format cameras. Wherever the light strikes the paper the silver halides form small specks of silver metal on their surface by the chemical process of reduction. The exposure is the greatest in areas of the print corresponding to clear parts of the negatives, which become the shadows or high density areas of the print.

This process is the formation of the latent image, as it forms an invisible image in the paper that is subsequently made visible by development. The paper is placed in the developer, which transforms the silver halide particles that have a latent image speck on them into metallic silver. Now the image is visible, but the remaining unexposed silver halide must still be removed to make the image permanent. But first the print is placed into the stop bath, which stops development and prevents the developer from contaminating the next bath: the fixer.

The fixer, typically sodium thiosulfate, is able to remove the unexposed silver halide by forming a water-soluble complex with it. And finally, a water wash sometimes preceded by a washing aid removes the fixer from the print, leaving an image composed of silver particles held in the clear gelatin image layer. Toning is sometimes used for permanence or aesthetic purposes and follows the fixing step. Selenium, gold, and sulfur toners are the most common and act by either partially converting the silver to another compound (such as silver selenide or silver sulfide) or partially replacing the silver with another metal (such as gold).

When small crystals (called grains) of silver salts such as silver bromide and silver chloride are exposed to light, a few atoms of free metallic silver are liberated. These free silver atoms form the latent image. This latent image is relatively stable and will persist for some months without degradation provided the film is kept dark and cool. Films are developed using solutions that reduce silver halides in the presence of free silver atoms. An 'amplification' of the latent image occurs as the silver halides near the free silver atom are reduced to metallic silver. The strength, temperature and time for which the developer is allowed to act allow the photographer to control the contrast of the final image. The development is then stopped by neutralizing the developer in a second bath.

Once development is complete, the undeveloped silver salts must be removed by fixing in sodium thiosulphate or ammonium thiosulphate, and then the negative or print must be washed in clean water. The final image consists of metallic silver embedded in the gelatin coating.

All gelatin silver photographic materials are subject to deterioration. The silver particles that comprise the image are susceptible to oxidation, leading to yellowing and fading of the image. Poor processing can also result in various forms of image degradation, due to residual silver-thiosulfate complexes. Toning increases the stability of the silver image by coating the silver image with a less easily oxidized metal such as gold, or by converting portions of the silver image particles into more stable compounds, such as silver selenide or silver sulfide.

== Digital silver gelatin printing ==
Also known as digital bromides, black and white silver gelatin prints imaged via digital output devices such as the Durst Lambda and the Océ LightJet have been developed for the art market by Ilford Imaging. Other ways to print silver gelatin involve the use of digital enlargers such as the Digingranditore by Giulio Limongelli or the De Vere 504DS. With these enlargers it is possible to use classic techniques of differentiated exposures such as burning, masking and vignetting using one's hands exactly as was once done with a negative.

By adapting a large format paper processor in conjunction with the manufacturers, McLeod's innovation led the way for the possibility of producing large resin-coated and fibre-based black and white prints.

Ilford, in collaboration with Metro Imaging, London, adapted their FB Galerie emulsion paper and its light sensitivity so that it would be receptive to full spectrum RGB laser channels.

== In molecular biology ==
An essentially identical procedure called "silver staining" is utilized in molecular biology to visualize DNA or proteins after gel electrophoresis, usually SDS-PAGE. The latent image is formed by the DNA or RNA or protein molecules (i.e. the reduced silver selectively precipitates onto those molecules). It is known for being nearly as sensitive as autoradiography, the "gold standard" technique, but one not widely used due to the use of radioactive materials.
