= Kensuke Koike =

Japanese contemporary visual artist

Kensuke Koike (小池健輔)
- Born: June 28, 1980 (age 45); Nagoya, Japan

Kensuke Koike (小池健輔, Koike Kensuke) (born June 28, 1980, in Nagoya, Japan) is a contemporary visual artist. Koike currently resides in Venice, Italy. He is a graduate of the Academy of Fine Arts, Venice (2004) and the Università Iuav di Venezia Faculty of Arts & Design (2007). He is best known for his intricate, handmade collages.

In 2016, he began a series in collaboration with French photography curator Thomas Sauvin titled No More, No Less. Using images selected by Sauvin, Koike shifts and swaps sections of the images without taking anything away, hence the title of the series.

Initially using his own photographs, Koike began using archival images and photographs found a flea markets. He chose to do this as it requires more thought to be put into the cutting process as there are no other copies of the image being used.

== Solo exhibitions ==
2009

- "Aliens' Lounge", Virgil de Voldere Gallery, New York City, United States
- "There's still much to do", Perugi Artecontemporanea gallery, Padua, Italy

2006

- "Stretching for dummies", Perugi Artecontemporanea gallery, Padua, Italy
