= John Benton-Harris =

American photographer and educator (1939–2023)

John Benton-Harris (September 28, 1939 – August 26, 2023) was an American photographer and educator who lived and worked in the United Kingdom.

== Life and work ==
John Benton-Harris was born in The Bronx, New York City on September 28, 1939. He worked as an industrial photographer with the Sinclair Oil Corporation for a period from 1961. He then completed mandatory military service as a photographer with the United States Army, in Italy. Afterwards he travelled in Europe, then in 1965 settled in London, working as a staff photographer for London Life magazine. He subsequently worked as a photojournalist for various newspapers and magazines.

In 1987/88 Benton-Harris was appointed adjunct Professor of Photography at the University of Michigan's School of Art.

Benton-Harris died on August 26, 2023, at the age of 83. He never retired, and was working on taking pictures and book projects until shortly before his death.

== Publications ==
=== Zines by Benton-Harris ===
- The English. Southport: Café Royal, 2018. Edition of 250 copies.
- Saint Patrick's People. Southport: Café Royal, 2019. Edition of 250 copies.
- Children of the Troubles: Northern Ireland. Southport: Café Royal, 2020. Edition of 250 copies.
- Walking New York 1961–1981. Southport: Café Royal, 2020. Edition of 250 copies.
- Walking London 1965–1988. Southport: Café Royal, 2021.

=== Books edited with others ===
- Through the Looking Glass: Photographic art in Britain 1945–1989. London: Barbican Art Gallery, 1989. Coedited by Benton-Harris and Gerry Badger. ISBN 0-85331-560-4.

== Exhibitions ==
=== Solo exhibitions ===
- A Walk in New York, Impressions Gallery, York, UK, 1973
- England, St Patrick's Day, Streets of NYC, The Photographers' Gallery, London, 1981/82

=== Group exhibitions ===
- Summer Show 6: Old masters were young once, Serpentine Galleries, London, 1971. Benton-Harris' work was shown on its own in the Print room.
- Two Views: Photographs of British Towns as Seen by Eight Photographers, The Photographers' Gallery, London, 1973. With work by Benton-Harris, Ian Berry, Colin Curwood, Chris Killip, Josef Koudelka, Ron McCormick, and Christine Pearcey.
- The Portrait Season, Impressions Gallery, York, UK, 1985. With work by Benton-Harris, Clive Landen, and Philip Sayer.

=== Exhibitions co-curated by Benton-Harris ===
- American Images: Photography 1945 to 1980, Barbican Art Gallery, London, 1985 and touring
- Through the Looking Glass: Photographic Art in Britain 1945–1989, Barbican Art Gallery, London, 1989; Manchester City Art Gallery, 1989/90

== Collections ==
Benton-Harris' work is held in the following permanent collections:

- Arts Council Collection, UK: 80 prints (as of September 28, 2021)
- Brooklyn Museum, Brooklyn, New York: 1 print (as of September 28, 2021)
- Museum of Contemporary Photography, Chicago, Illinois: 2 prints (as of September 28, 2021)
- National Portrait Gallery, London: 9 prints (as of September 28, 2021)
