= Gerry Badger =

English writer, curator of photography and photographer

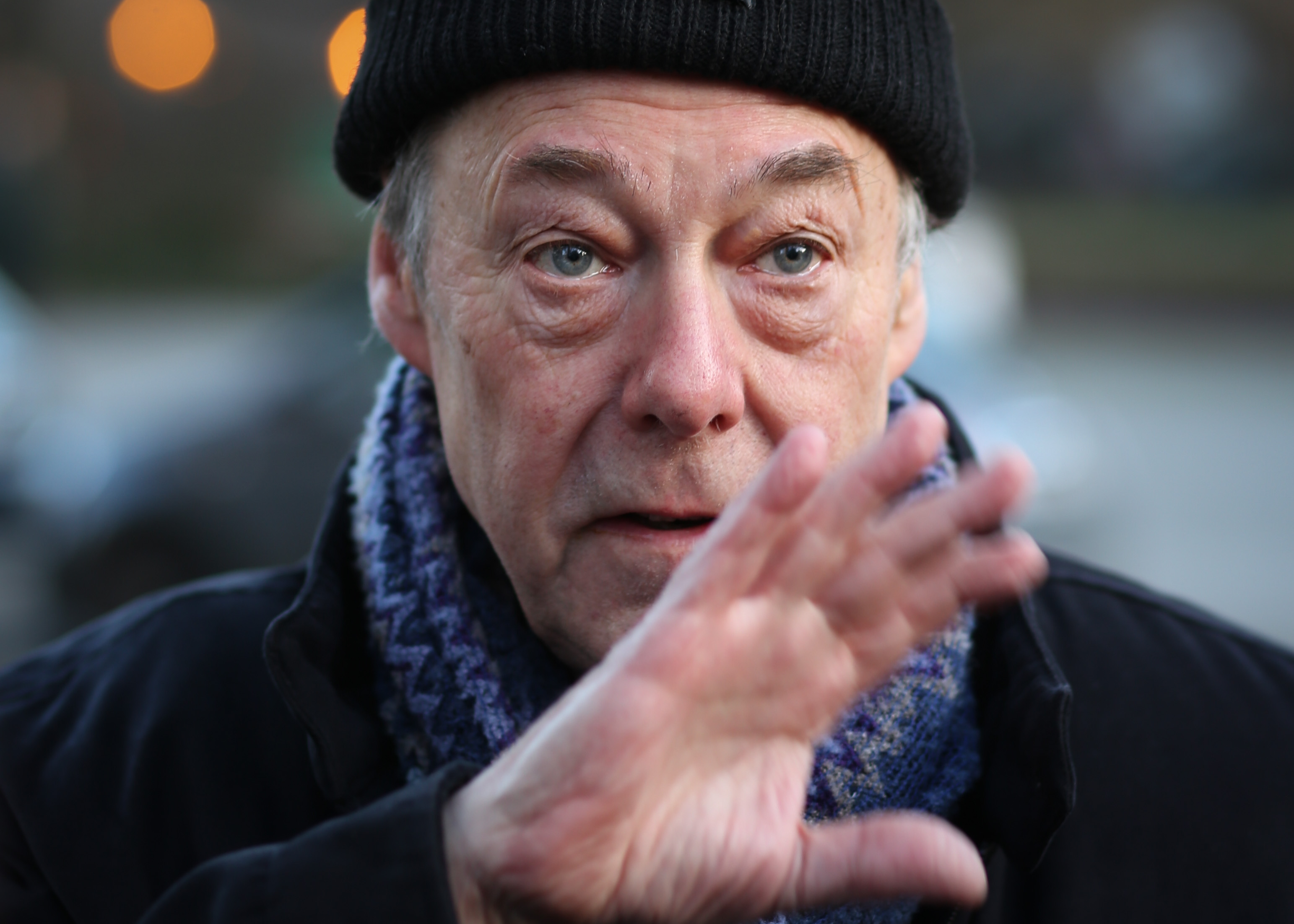
Gerry Badger (2016)

Gerald David "Gerry" Badger (born 1946) is an English writer and curator of photography, and a photographer.

In 2018, he received the J Dudley Johnston Award from the Royal Photographic Society.

== Life and career ==
Badger was born in 1946 in Northampton. He studied architecture at Duncan of Jordanstone College of Art (Dundee), graduating with a diploma in 1969.

Badger is the author of a number of books on photography.

The two volumes then published of The Photobook: A History, which Badger co-wrote with Martin Parr, won the 2006 book award for photography from the Kraszna-Krausz Foundation. The second volume won a Deutscher Fotobuchpreis (German Photobook Prize). His book The Pleasures of Good Photographs won the International Center for Photography's Infinity Award, Writing category, in 2011.

As a photographer, Badger identifies his usual subject as "landscapes and accretions of history".

== Exhibitions ==
- La poesia dei muri, Italian Cultural Institute, London 2019
- Gerry Badger. Blue Sky Gallery, Portland, OR.
- The Photographers' Gallery, London, 1975.
- British Art, 1940–1980, Hayward Gallery, London, 1980.
- Towards a Bigger Picture, Victoria and Albert Museum, London, and Tate Gallery, Liverpool, 1988–1989.
- The Art of the Garden, Tate Britain, London, 2004.
- Unpopular Culture: Grayson Perry Selects from the Arts Council Collection, De La Warr Pavilion, Bexhill-on-Sea, UK, 2008 and travelled to Harris Museum, Preston, 2008; DLI Museum and Art Gallery, Durham, 2008–2009; Southampton City Art Gallery, 2009; Aberystwyth Arts Centre, 2009; Scarborough Art Gallery, 2009); Longside Gallery, Yorkshire Sculpture Park, Wakefield, 2009; and Victoria Art Gallery, Bath, 2009–2010. Postwar British paintings, sculpture and photography curated by Grayson Perry from the Arts Council Collection.

=== Exhibitions curated ===
- The Photographer as Printmaker, for the Arts Council of Great Britain, The Photographers' Gallery, London, 1980.
- Through the Looking Glass: Photographic Art in Britain 1945–1989, Barbican Arts Centre, London, 1989 (with John Benton-Harris).
- Lares Familiares, Sonia Lenzi, for the Archaeological Museum in Naples, 2016 (with Marco De Gemmis)

== Publications ==
=== Publications by Badger ===
- Photographer as Printmaker: 140 Years of Photographic Printmaking. London: Arts Council of Great Britain and Northampton, England: Belmont Press, 1981. ISBN 0-7287-0294-0.
- Eugène Atget. London: Macdonald, 1985. ISBN 0-356-10852-X. The work of Eugène Atget.
- Chris Killip 55. London: Phaidon, 2001. ISBN 0-7148-4028-9. On Chris Killip.
- Eugène Atget 55. London: Phaidon, 2001. ISBN 0-7148-4049-1. On Eugène Atget.
- Collecting Photography. London: Mitchell Beazley, 2003. ISBN 1-84000-726-5.
- The Genius of Photography. How Photography has changed our lives. London: Quadrille, 2007. ISBN 1-84400-363-9. "As seen on BBC."
- The Pleasures of Good Photographs: Essays. New York: Aperture, 2010. ISBN 978-1-59711-139-3.
- It Was a Grey Day - Photographs of Berlin. Peperoni Books, 2015. ISBN 978-3941825802.
- Another Country: Documentary Photography Since 1945. Thames & Hudson, 2022. ISBN 978-0500022177.

=== Publications with others ===
- Photo Texts. London: Travelling Light, 1988. ISBN 0-906333-22-9. Essays by Badger and Peter Turner.
- Through the Looking Glass: Photographic art in Britain 1945–1989. London: Barbican Art Gallery, 1989. ISBN 0-85331-560-4. Coedited by Badger and John Benton-Harris.
- The Photobook: A History Volume I. London: Phaidon, 2004. ISBN 0-7148-4285-0. With Martin Parr.
- The Photobook: A History Volume II. London: Phaidon, 2006. ISBN 0-7148-4433-0. With Martin Parr.
- The Photobook: A History Volume III. London: Phaidon, 2014. ISBN 978-0-714866-77-2. With Martin Parr.
- Photobook Phenomenon. Munich: Prestel; CCCB/RM/Fundació Foto Colectania, 2017. A box set of eight booklets of writing, one each by Moritz Neumüller and Lesley Martin, Markus Schaden and Frederic Lezmi, Martin Parr, Horacio Fernández, Ryuichi Kaneko, Badger ("Propaganda books versus protest books"), Erik Kessels, and Irene de Mendoza and Neumüller. ISBN 978-8417047054.

=== Publications with contributed photographs by Badger ===
- Unpopular Culture: Grayson Perry Selects from the Arts Council Collection. London: Hayward, 2008. ISBN 9781853322679. Work from the Arts Council Collection, edited by Grayson Perry.
- One Day: 10 Photographers. Heidelberg, Germany: Kehrer, 2010. ISBN 978-3-86828-173-6. A boxed set, edited by Harvey Benge, of ten books of photographs taken on 20 June 2010, each book by one of Badger, Jessica Backhaus, Benge, John Gossage, Todd Hido, Rob Hornstra, Rinko Kawauchi, Eva Maria Ocherbauer, Martin Parr and Alec Soth. (Note: The publisher's description of this set: "One Day - Kehrer Verlag". Kehrer Verlag.)

=== Publications with contributed texts by Badger ===
- A Short History of Photography. Dewi Lewis Publishing, 2008. By Martin Benge with introduction by Gerry Badger. ISBN 978-1904587514.
- Photography, Vol. 2, A New Vision of the World, 1891 – 1940. Milan: Skira, 2012. ISBN 9788857210322. Texts by Badger, Clément Chéroux, Sandra S. Phillips, Ulrich Pohlmann and Francesco Zanot.
- The Chinese Photobook. New York: Aperture, 2015. ISBN 978-1597112284. By Martin Parr and WassinkLundgren. Texts by Badger, Gu Zheng, Stephanie Tung, Raymund Lum and Ruben Lundgren.
- Memento Mori. The Lares Familiares of Sonia Lenzi. Naples, Giannini Editore, 2016 ISBN 9788874318407.

== Awards ==
- 2018: J Dudley Johnston Award, Royal Photographic Society, Bath

== Collections ==
- Arts Council Collection, Arts Council, London
- Bibliothèque nationale de France, Paris
- Victoria and Albert Museum, London
- The Museum of Modern Art, New York, NY
- The Portland Art Museum, Portland, OR
