= Arnis Balčus =

Latvian artist

- Born: April 2, 1978 (age 47); Riga, Latvia
- Education: University of Latvia, University of Westminster
- Known for: Photography

Arnis Balčus (born 1978) is a Latvian photography and video artist. Born in Riga, Latvia, Balčus lived and worked in his home town before moving to London in 2004. He took an MA course on photography at University of Westminster from 2004 to 2005. He is exhibiting his work since 1994, but emerged internationally in 2003 with the photographic series Myself, Friends, Lovers and Others. Using snapshot aesthetic the series were showing the everyday life of contemporary Latvian youth. The series had numerous solo shows, for instance, at Giedre Bartelt gallery, Berlin (2003), Overgaden, Copenhagen (2003), Fotogalerie Wien, Vienna (2004), State Museum of Art, Riga (2004) and Matthew Bown Gallery, London (2005). In 2020 the series were published as a photobook by dieNacht Publishing in Leipzig, Germany.

Since 2008 most of his photographic work has been related to Latvian identity, historical taboos and social-political agendas. In 2009 Arnis Balčus showed his series Amnesia at Riga Art Space. In the photographs he was staging various social rituals that have disappeared from the everyday life in Latvia due to political and economical changes in the past thirty years. The exhibition traveled to Ventspils. In the series Latvian Notes he has been exploring the everyday life in Latvia. This research is focused on Latvian society through the perspective of collective rituals and public space. The series Victory Park grappled with questions on Otherness – and more specifically, in the context of Latvia’s complex relationship with Russia, and Russian culture. In 2014 the series were shown at Street Level Photoworks in Glasgow and Mūkusala Art Centre in Riga. In 2016 the series were released as a photobook by Brave Books in Berlin. The series Beyond The Blue River are related to the Zilupe region in Latgale, which on an everyday basis is characterized as economically unstable and politically disloyal to Latvia.

In his video works he addresses issues of identity and gender. His video Xionel (2004) features a confession by a beautiful Asian transsexual, while Balcus' Latvia 1989-91 is a photo story created of artist's family snapshots from the time Latvia regained its independence from USSR. For the past few years Balčus has been attending and documenting the local latvian punk youth. These pictures and videos can be viewed on his social media.

Balčus' work has also been published in various art and lifestyle magazines, such as Black and White Magazine, Dazed & Confused (magazine), Flash Art Magazine, Soul Mag, Achtung Mode and many more.

From January 2011 he is the chief editor of the main Latvian photography magazine - FK Magazine. He is a co-founder and director of Riga Photomonth that runs since 2014.
