= Richard Leach Maddox =

English photographer (1816–1902)

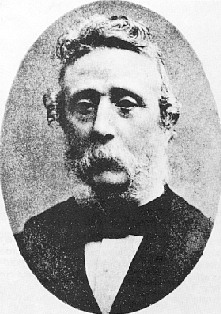
- Richard Leach Maddox
- Born: 4 August 1816; Bath, England
- Died: 11 May 1902 (aged 85); Portswood, Southampton, Hampshire, England
- Citizenship: British
- Spouse(s): Amelia Maddox (1849-1871); Agnes Maddox (1875-1902)
- Awards: John Scott Medal (1889); Royal Photographic Society's Silver Progress Medal (1901)
- Scientific career
- Fields: Photographer; Physician

Richard Leach Maddox (4 August 1816 – 11 May 1902) was an English photographer and physician who invented lightweight gelatin negative dry plates for photography in 1871.

== Early life ==
Richard Leach Maddox was born at Bath, England, on 4 August 1816.

== Photomicographic studies ==
Long before his discovery of the dry gelatin photographic emulsion, Maddox was prominent in what was called photomicrography - photographing minute organisms under the microscope. The eminent photomicrographer of the day, Lionel S. Beale, included as a frontispiece images made by Maddox in his manual 'How to work with the Microscope'

== Invention of lightweight gelatin dry plates ==
In photography, the Collodion process was invented in 1851 by Frederick Scott Archer. This invention required only two to three seconds of light exposure to produce an image, but plates had to be sensitized at the time of exposure, exposed while the emulsion was still wet, and processed immediately after exposure in the camera.

When he noticed that his health was being affected by the 'wet' collodion's ether vapor, Maddox began looking for a substitute. He suggested in the 8 September 1871 British Journal of Photography article An Experiment with Gelatino-Bromide that sensitizing chemicals cadmium bromide and silver nitrate should be coated on a glass plate in gelatin, a transparent substance used for making candies. Eventually Charles Harper Bennett made the first gelatin dry plates for sale; before long the emulsion could be coated on celluloid roll film.

Dry plates had been tried before: and had no effect. silver nitrate with a binder of albumen - derived from egg white, and widely used in printing-out paper in the nineteenth century - had been coated on glass; but these proved to be too insensitive for camera use. Gelatin had also been suggested by photo-theorist and colour pioneer Thomas Sutton, and the substance would also have been known to Maddox - himself an eminent microscope practitioner - through its use as a holding/preserving base used in microscope slides.

Initially Maddox tried other bases. He combined silver bromide with "vegetable gummy matters" (lichen, linseed, quince), and "starchy substances" (rice, tapioca, sago). "Often I fancied I was just within the doorway when the door closed, and other plans had to be tried." Finally he tried gelatin from a packet of Nelson's Gelatine Granuals.

Maddox prepared a number of plates, exposing by contact-printing them from other negatives, and putting each through a different exposure trial. "The resulting prints were very delicate in detail, of a colour varying between a bistre and olive tint, and after washing dried to a brilliant surface". He later described trials on "out-of-door subjects", but it was "impossible to get some laurels depicted in anything more than black and white" (i.e. without gray-scale tones).

Maddox freely gave his discovery of the dry gelatin process to the world, saying (to W. J. Harrison, in a letter of 1887) that "[I had] no thought of bringing the subject into notice until it had been lifted from the cradle". Maddox, at the initial stage of invention, could probably produce only 'lantern slides' contact-copied from his microscope plates, the slow speed being impracticable for camera lens images.

It was these origins that led to the miniaturization and adaptability of photographic emulsions, and consequently paved the way for social and action photography and cinematography.

The advantages of the dry plate were obvious: photographers could use commercial dry plates off the shelf instead of having to prepare their own emulsions in a mobile darkroom. Negatives did not have to be developed immediately. Also, for the first time, cameras could be made small enough to be hand-held, or even concealed: further research created 'fast' exposure times, which led to 'snapshot' photography (and the 'Kodak' camera with roll film), ultimately paving the way for cinematography.

== Family ==
Maddox and his first wife, Amelia, were married in Constantinople in 1849. They lived from circa 1860 in the Woolston area of Southampton - an area where many medical men were located, due to the vicinity of the recently built military hospital at Netley. Amelia died in 1871.

In 1875, Maddox married his second wife, Agnes. In this same year they left for Corsica, and then lived for a time in Bordighera. Maddox's son by this marriage, Walter, was born in Southampton in 1880. Prior to that date, the Maddoxes were living at Gunnersbury, London.

== Pause in practice ==
It was poor health that again halted Maddox's experiments. But even then it is an odd fact that he had been persuaded to publish his findings in 1871, before he felt his trials were complete. The reason for this is that the editor of the British Journal of Photography, J. Traill Taylor, had fallen ill and made a desperate appeal for contributions from his friends.

As an indicator of the condition of his health, Maddox was listed as 'not practising at present' in the national censuses for 1861 and 1871. His daughter wrote, however, "He was at different times resident physician to the late Duke of Montrose, the late Sir Watkins Wynn, and the late Katherine Bannerman," indicating periods of better health.

== Late life ==
Richard Maddox's later years were marred by poverty and ill health. The November 1891 Photographic Times wrote of "a breach of trust by a trustee of his, now deceased", though little is known of this. Andrew Pringle, the following month, sent a letter to The American Amateur Photographer saying that "much of what was left for his declining years was made away with by an unscrupulous trustee." Evidence of Maddox's only possible contact with business in relation to his dry-emulsion experiments, is his mention (in the letter of 1887 to Harrison) of how "the process was offered to a firm in Southampton...but it was found there was no time to continue the necessary experiments to raise the rapidity and enhance the value."

From 1886, Maddox lived (according to his daughter) in "a most retired manner" at the house called 'Greenbank' in Portswood, Southampton, dying there on 11 May 1902.

== Criticism and awards ==
Fortunately Maddox's work had not been forgotten in certain quarters, and J. Traill Taylor - then editor of The British Journal of Photography - was active in setting up 'The Maddox Fund' and the 'Maddox Testimonial Committee' in 1891. The intention was both to assert Maddox's claim as inventor and to afford him some pecuniary help - and the subsequent response was strong, in both Britain and the United States. The secretary of the committee was Andrew Pringle and the chairman was James Glaisher, president of the Photographic Society of Great Britain.

By 1892, £500 had been raised, with a further £100 from the Ilford Company. Taylor later criticized John Burgess in a counter claimant as "entering the field two years later, and even then not publishing his process, which remains a secret to this day." Pringle wrote: "Whatever Dr Maddox has done for science has been without hope of recompense, and without attempt to turn his discoveries to pecuniary profit". Similarly, the editor of the American Amateur Photographer, in the same month, found that "no honor is great enough to bestow on a discoverer who acts so generously in giving his process to the world".

Maddox was awarded the John Scott Medal in 1889 and the Royal Photographic Society's Silver Progress Medal in 1901.

== Death ==
After his death in 1902, Maddox's daughter Isabella wrote: "My father's medical attendant, Dr. Wales, said that it was 'the triumph of mind over body' that had kept him alive for so long." The obituary in the Almanac of the British Journal of Photography was not entirely uncritical, saying that the "real difficulties of the process were encountered and overcome by those who came after Maddox...whose ideas were not altogether practicable." Yet the obituary also stresses Maddox's readiness to help others "to the fullest of his capacities." Richard Maddox's friend, W.J. Bolton, made an analysis of the chemistry some nine years later.

Maddox was survived by his children, Isabella and Richard Willes, an artist, who died in 1929 and 1953 respectively.

== See also ==
- Timeline of photography technology
- History of the camera
