= KesselsKramer =

Dutch advertising agency

KesselsKramer is an independent advertising agency established by Erik Kessels and Johan Kramer in 1996. It is based in Amsterdam with a staff of about sixteen.

Tim Clark, writing in Time, called KesselsKramer "legendary and unorthodox". Its notable advertising campaigns have been "The Worst Hotel In The World" for Hans Brinker Budget Hotel in Amsterdam, and "I Amsterdam" for the city of Amsterdam. KesselsKramer has also worked for brands such as Nike, Levi's, Diageo, and developed the brands citizenM, Ben NL and Bol.com. Among current clients are NEMO Science Museum, Van Lanschot, and the International Documentary Film Festival Amsterdam.

== History ==
In 2002, KesselsKramer arranged the "other final", a soccer match between Bhutan and Montserrat, and produced a documentary film about this, The Other Final.
