= Archive of Modern Conflict =

English independent publisher

Archive of Modern Conflict (AMC) is an organisation and independent publisher based in Holland Park, London, England.

AMC was established in the early 1990s and maintains an archive of vernacular material relating to the history of war, primarily photographs but also manuscripts and objects. Its material is acquired from a variety of sources both national and international, covering the nineteenth and twentieth centuries. It has published numerous books, some of which have won awards, has curated exhibitions worldwide drawing upon its archive, and collaborated with artists.

== The archive ==
The archive primarily contains photographs from the nineteenth and twentieth centuries, both national and international, totalling some 4 million items of professional and amateur photography: snapshots and throwaways, amateur and anonymous, across eras and ages, media and material; discarded personal albums, press photos and entire photographic archives from defunct institutions and publications. It also contains regimental albums, postcards, posters and objects. The material comes from a variety of sources including auctions, fairs and street markets.

The main archive is housed in Holland Park, London, but Archive of Modern Conflict also has archives in Toronto, Canada; and in Beijing, China, through Thomas Sauvin. Its collection has been described as "eclectic and often deeply subversive" and an "eccentric range of photographs".

In 2012, AMC acquired the Matthew R. Isenburg Collection of 20,000 items including daguerreotypes, stereoviews, early cameras and other material at a cost of $15 million (US). This was the highest sum ever paid for a single hoard of 19th century photographic materials.

== Staff and funding ==
Archive of Modern Conflict does not publish many details of its make-up, but various sources report that it is owned by and receives all its funding from Toronto art collector and billionaire Baron Thomson of Fleet, chairman of Thomson Reuters. Timothy Prus is its founder, an editor and curator; Edwin Jones is an editor; and James Welch is an editor, designer and archivist. Other staff include Kalev Erickson and Tony Cairns.

== Publications (selected) ==
- Nein, Onkel = No, Uncle: Snapshots from Another Front 1938–1945. London: Archive of Modern Conflict, 2007. Edited by Ed Jones and Timothy Prus. ISBN 978-0-9547091-1-2. A collection of photographs that recounts the daily lives of members of the Nazi military.
- Scrapbook. Göttingen: Steidl; London: Archive of Modern Conflict, 2009. Edited by Donovan Wylie and Timothy Prus. ISBN 3865219101. A freshly created scrapbook of material published during the Northern Irish "troubles".
- Happy Tonite. London: Archive of Modern Conflict, 2010. Edited by Ed Jones and James Welch. ISBN 978-0-9547091-6-7. Edition of 1000 copies. Photographs selected by Ed Jones and James Welch from the collection of Chinese photography assembled by Thomas Sauvin. Includes the work of Liu YiQing, Cai Hongshuo, Chang He, Zeng Han, Yang Changhong, Bai Chuan, Dustin Shum, Chang Qing, Fang Er, Feng Li, Luo Dan and Jiang Yiming
- Holy Bible. By Adam Broomberg & Oliver Chanarin. London: Mack; London: Archive of Modern Conflict, 2013. (Later reprinted.) ISBN 978-1907946417. Epilogue by Adi Ophir.
- A Complete Examination of Middlesex. London: Archive of Modern Conflict, 2013. By Bruce Gilden. ISBN 978-0-9570490-5-5. (Note: The photographs can be seen here within Gilden's website.)
- Thomas Sauvin: Silvermine. London: Archive of Modern Conflict, 2013. ISBN 978-0-9570490-1-7. Five albums each containing 20 prints. Edition of 200 copies.
- Amc2 Journal.
  - Amc2 Journal Issue 1. London: Archive of Modern Conflict, 2011.
  - Amc2 Journal Issue 2 London: Archive of Modern Conflict, 2012.
  - Amc2 Journal Issue 3. London: Archive of Modern Conflict, 2012.
  - Amc2 Journal Issue 4. London: Archive of Modern Conflict, 2012.
  - Amc2 Journal Issue 5. London: Archive of Modern Conflict, 2013. Published to coincide with Notes Home, an exhibition curated by Timothy Prus and Ed Jones for Format Festival 2013, Derby, England.
  - Amc2 Journal Issue 6. London: Archive of Modern Conflict, 2013. Newspaper format.
  - Amc2 Journal Issue 7. London: Archive of Modern Conflict, 2013. ASIN B00JW2NBSU.
  - Amc2 Journal Issue 8: Quanshen. London: Archive of Modern Conflict, 2013. Photographs collected and edited by Thomas Sauvin.
  - Amc2 Journal Issue 9: Amore e Piombo: The Photography of Extremes in 1970s Italy. London: Archive of Modern Conflict, 2014. Published to accompany the exhibition Amore e Piombo: The Photography of Extremes in 1970s Italy, Brighton Photo Biennial, 2014.
  - Amc2 Journal Issue 10. London: Archive of Modern Conflict, 2014. Published to coincide with LagosPhoto 2014.
  - Amc2 Journal Issue 11: A Guide for the Protection of the Public in Peacetime. London: Archive of Modern Conflict, 2014. Published to accompany Archive of Modern Conflict's contribution to the exhibition Conflict, Time, Photography at Tate Modern, London
  - Amc2 Journal Issue 12: The Great Refusal. London: Archive of Modern Conflict, 2014.

== Exhibitions contributed to or curated by AMC (selected) ==
- Collected Shadows, Museum of Contemporary Canadian Art, Toronto, 2 May – 3 June 2013. Curated by Timothy Prus and organised by Archive of Modern Conflict.
- The Great Refusal: Protesting 1948-1984, Hayward Gallery, London, 12 October 2013 – 5 January 2014.
- Amore e Piombo: The Photography of Extremes in 1970s Italy, Brighton Museum & Art Gallery, Brighton Photo Biennial, Brighton, England, 4 October – 2 November 2014. Co-commissioned by the Archive of Modern Conflict and Photoworks, curated by Roger Hargreaves and Federica Chiocchetti.
- A Guide for the Protection of the Public in Peacetime, part of Conflict, Time, Photography, Tate Modern, London, 26 November 2014 – 15 March 2015.

== Awards ==
- 2008: Nein, Onkel: Snapshots From Another Front 1938–1945 edited by Ed Jones and Timothy Prus won Historical Book Prize, Rencontres d'Arles 2008.
- 2009: In History by Susan Meiselas won Historical Book Prize, Rencontres d'Arles 2009.
- 2011: Happy Tonite edited by Ed Jones and James Welch won 2011 Best Book Award, Dali International Photography Exhibition, Dali City, China.
