= Sonia Lenzi =

Italian photographer and multidisciplinary artist

- Born: January 4, 1964 (age 62)
- Citizenship: Italian
- Education: Academy of Fine Arts Philosophy Law
- Occupations: Photographer and multidisciplinary artist
- Website: www.sonialenzi.com

Sonia Lenzi (born January 4, 1964) is an Italian photographer and multidisciplinary artist. Her work focuses on memory, community, and kinship, and is informed by her background in fine arts, philosophy, and law.

== Life and education ==
Lenzi was born in Bologna in 1964. She graduated in philosophy at the University of Bologna, in painting at the Academy of Fine Arts of Bologna and then in Law.

Her artistic and photographic practice focuses on memory, community, and kinship. In both Ritratti dell’Ultimo Ritratto, then Last Portrait she worked on genealogies from a feminist perspective. In It Could Have Been Me she approached the issue of the Bologna Massacre of 2 August 1980 as a public art project, supported by the Association of the Victims.

In 2021, she published and exhibited at Blue Sky, Oregon Center for the Photographic Arts, Take Me to Live with You, featuring seven parental figures of reference that have been part of Italian feminism or the social scene. The portraits she took of Robert Adams taken while she was in Oregon, are part of the Image Collection of the National Gallery of Art Library.

A Place to Live is a project about the economic, environmental, political and global crisis, that has enormous repercussions on the topic of housing, in real life and as a metaphor of human condition. Unlikely Monuments is a project about the meaning of monuments, especially referring to women, misprepresented and underrepresented individuals and communities and their place in the public sphere.

== Publications ==
- It Could Have Been Me/Avrei potuto essere Io, self published 2015
- Lares Familiares, Giannini Editore, Naples, 2016 - ISBN 978-88-7431-840-7
- Last Portrait, Tosca Press, self published, 2019 - ISBN 978-1-5272-3991-3
- Take Me to Live with You. Kehrer Verlag, Heidelberg, 2021- ISBN 978-3-96900-049-6
- Looking for My Daughters. Artphilein, Lugano, Switzerland, 2022 – ISBN 978-88-945186-4-1
- Unlikely Monuments. Excerpt from the catalogue, Tosca Press, self published, 2024

== Exhibitions ==
- It Could Have Been Me/Avrei potuto essere io, 2015, temporary installation 31 July – 15 September at Hight Train Speed Station, Bologna
- Lares Familiares, Archaeological Museum, Naples – 2016, and ICI London – 2019
- Take Me to Live with You. A Social Family Album. Blue Sky, Oregon Centre for the Photographic Arts –2021
- A Place to Live, Focus Artphilein, Lugano, Switzerland, 2023
- Unlikely Monuments/Monumenti improbabili, Istituto Parri, Bologna, 2024
