= Charles Harper Bennett =

- Born: 1840; Clapham Park
- Died: 1927; Sydney
- Occupation: Photographer

Charles Harper Bennett (born 1840 in London, died 1927 in Sydney) was an English photographic pioneer.

He improved the gelatin silver process developed by Richard Leach Maddox, first in 1873 by a method of hardening the emulsion, making it more resistant to friction, and later in 1878 Bennett discovered that by prolonged heating the sensitivity of the emulsion could be greatly increased. This increased sensitivity resulting enabled shooting at 1/25 second, paving the way for the snapshot.

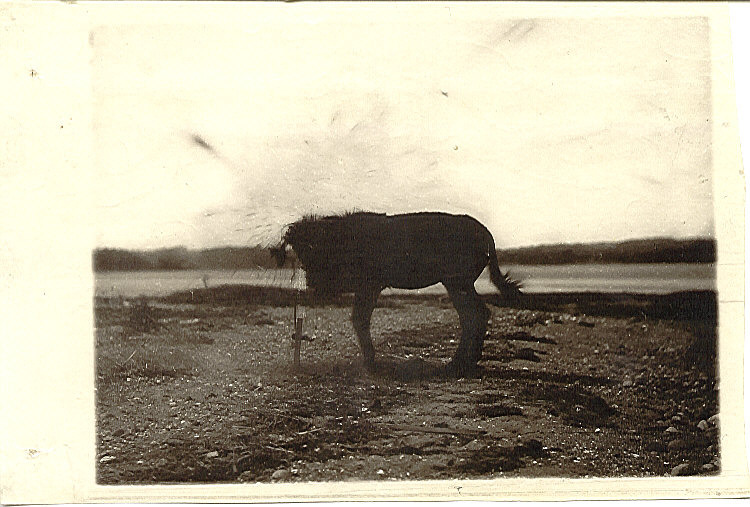
A mule keeps standing while its head is blown up with dynamite to demonstrate the speed of photography based on a new gelatin dry plate process by Charles Bennett. A photograph taken on 6 June 1881, published in Scientific American on September 24, 1881.
