= Found photography =

Non-art photos re-evaluated as art

In found photography, non-art photographs, usually anonymous, are given aesthetic meaning by an artist.

== Origin and use of the term ==
Found photography places non-art photos in an art context, usually by simply reinterpreting them. Although found objects considered broadly have been a part of artistic practice since Marcel Duchamp’s Bottle Rack (1914), found photos used analogously by artists are a far more recent phenomenon. Snapshots (ordinary family photos) were the first “vernacular photos [to be] discovered and reconsidered as art,” beginning with a series of books in the 1970s.

The term “found photography” can also be used to refer to any art that incorporates found photos as material, assembling or transforming them in some fashion. For example, Stephen Bull, in his introduction to A Companion to Photography, describes artist Joachim Schmid as “a key practitioner of ‘found photography.’”

Anonymous photographs also constitute vernacular photography under some of its current definitions. However, vernacular photography is generally discussed and exhibited as a group of related photographic genres meant to be studied or appreciated just as they are or were, without taking the photos out of their original historical contexts or giving them new aesthetic meaning.

Photographic genres other than snapshots are less commonly used as material for found photography. For example, real photo postcards, a genre that includes snapshots printed on postcard stock, are much less plentiful than snapshots (as almost all of them were made during a relatively brief period). Though the pool of material is much smaller, aesthetic approaches have been tried.

== Publication and exhibition history ==
The initial discovery of snapshots in American publishing in the 1970s was followed in the 1980s by publication of the Hungarian collector Sándor Kardos’s Horus Archives (1989).

Found photos were first exhibited in 1998. Douglas R. Nickel, curator of the San Francisco Museum of Modern Art’s Snapshots: The Photography of Everyday Life, 1888 to the Present, was the first to begin to articulate what it means to “find” a photo:

[A]ctual snapshots are taken with objectives only peripherally related to those of high art. . . . Without discounting the importance of the constitutive social and technical factors that motivate this class of photographic object into being, we must grant that there is a fascination to certain examples that allows them a kind of afterlife, a license to circulate in other contexts. When the snapshot becomes “anonymous”—when the family history ends and the album surfaces at a flea market, photographic fair, or historical society—and the image is severed from its original, private function, it also becomes open, available to a range of readings wider than those associated with its conception.

The Metropolitan Museum’s Other Pictures: Anonymous Photographs from the Thomas Walther Collection (2000), the work of a noted photography collector, demonstrated that found photos can meet the stringent standards of a sophisticated and photographically informed personal aesthetic. Thomas Walther has even asserted that—specifically in working with found photos, as opposed to his practice as a collector of art photography—his activity is that of an artist: “It's my own vision that I'm trying to find in the vernacular.”

In 2007, the National Gallery mounted The Art of the American Snapshot, 1888–1978: From the Collection of Robert E. Jackson, which remains the most ambitious snapshot show to date. The Art of the American Snapshot was a chronology of snapshot styles and subjects from the first Kodak until the moment snapshots began to resemble those we know today. The curators did not use the term vernacular photography in characterizing their approach, but distinguished it from those of both Snapshots: The Photography of Everyday Life and Other Pictures. The museum director and the chief curator described the exhibition's purpose as “to reveal. . . fundamental aspects of American photography and American life” and to “[examine] the evolution of this popular art in America.”

Since The Art of the American Snapshot, U.S. museums and galleries have generally presented snapshots as vernacular photography, minimizing the aesthetic contribution of the collector or the curator. Snapshots have become a ubiquitous if modest presence in art institutions, but are not intended and do not function as art; they are documentation of social or photo history.

Although art institutions in the United States no longer conceptualize snapshots as found photography (i.e., as found photos in the technical sense), collectors of snapshots still do. The collecting community around New York's Chelsea Flea Market has been documented in a film, Other People's Pictures, by Lorca Shepperd and Cabot Philbrick. The film illustrates the range of aesthetic approaches taken by collectors.

Found photography as a conspicuous art-world phenomenon has been largely limited to the United States; all major snapshot exhibitions have been mounted in American museums (in addition to the museum shows mentioned above, John Foster's Accidental Mysteries, a self-curated traveling show, deserves mention). But the Internet has facilitated the growth of an international scene, permitting the exchange of ideas and photos beyond local flea markets and the like; eBay, Instagram, and especially Facebook are home to a lively global found-photo community. Since the mid-2010s, snapshots have been appearing at photo fairs and in galleries and small museums in Europe and Australia (and occasionally further afield). The material has usually been understood and treated as found photos, rather than vernacular photography as in modern American museums. (Note: The French collector Jean-Marie Donat, a "typologist of the snapshot," is an exception.)

== Bibliography ==
- Adès, Dawn, et al. (1999). Marcel Duchamp. New York: Thames & Hudson. ISBN 978-0500204702
- Dean, Tacita; Ridgewell, Martyn (2001). Floh. Göttingen: Steidl. ISBN 978-3882436730
- Flickr: The Museum of Found Photographs Pool (n.d.) https://www.flickr.com/groups/47255139@N00/pool/.
- King, Graham (1984). Say “Cheese”: Looking at Snapshots in a New Way. New York: Dodd, Mead. ISBN 978-0396083542
- Green, Jonathan, ed. (1974). “The Snapshot.” Aperture 19:1. http://enculturation.net/3_2/mauer/index.html.
- Kimmelman, Michael (2006). “The Art of Being Artless.” In Kimmelman, The Accidental Masterpiece: On the Life of Art and Vice Versa, pp. 29–50. New York: Penguin. ISBN 978-0143037330
- Mauer, Barry. “The Found Photograph and the Limits of Meaning.” Enculturation, Fall 2001. http://enculturation.net/3_2/mauer/index.html.
- Philbrick, Cabot; Shepperd, Lorca (2004). Other People’s Pictures. http://www.other-peoples-pictures.com/trailer.htm.
- Seabrook, Andrea (n.d.). “‘Other People’s Pictures’.” NPR. https://www.npr.org/2004/06/20/1964382/other-peoples-pictures.
- U.S. Copyright Office (n.d.). “Can I Use Someone Else’s Work? Can Someone Else Use Mine?” (FAQ). Copyright.gov. http://www.copyright.gov/help/faq/faq-fairuse.html.
