= Vernacular photography =

Any of a wide range of popular photographies that have traditionally been overlooked

Vernacular photography is photography made for a wide range of functional and everyday purposes, including commercial and scientific work and personal snapshots, in contrast with fine-art photography. Vernacular photography is also distinct from both found photography and amateur photography. The term originated among academics and curators, but has moved into wider usage.

== History and usage of the term ==
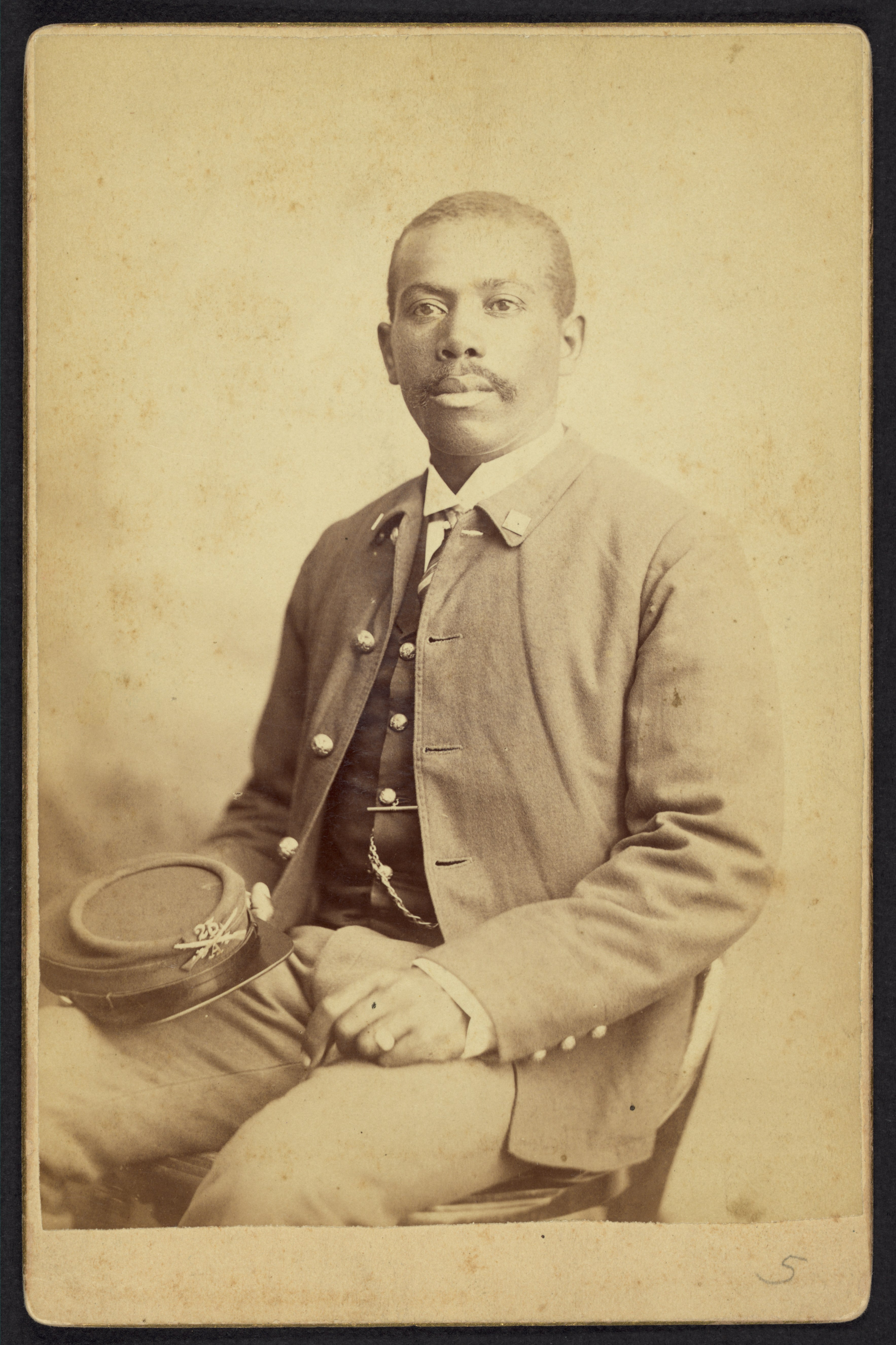
Cabinet card portrait of a Buffalo Soldier by Orlando Scott Goff, c. 1884–1890: an example of vernacular photography

Current thinking about vernacular photography was anticipated as early as 1964 by John Szarkowski, director of photography at the Museum of Modern Art in New York from 1962 until 1991. In his book The Photographer's Eye, Szarkowski proposed to recognize what he called "functional photography" alongside the traditional category of fine-art photography; his point was that all photography could possess the merits he sought. Examples in Szarkowski's book and the exhibition it was based on included ordinary snapshots, magazine photos, studio portraiture, and specialized documentary work by anonymous professionals.

The current wave of interest began in 2000, with a "seminal" essay, "Vernacular Photographies", by the art historian and curator Geoffrey Batchen. Batchen used the term vernacular photography to refer to "what has always been excluded from photography's history: ordinary photographs, the ones made or bought (or sometimes bought and then made over) by everyday folk from 1839 until now, the photographs that preoccupy the home and the heart but rarely the museum or the academy." Batchen had in mind a wide range of photographies made by or for ordinary people, including intentional art and the work of certain professionals: daguerreotypes, ambrotypes, snapshots and snapshot albums, "panoramas of church groups, wedding pictures, formal portraits of the family dog. . . . To these examples could be added a multitude of equally neglected indigenous genres and practices, from gilt Indian albumen prints, to American painted and framed tintypes, to Mexican fotoescultura, to Nigerian ibeji images." (Note: Batchen has recently mentioned an earlier use of the term, in the title of a photo fair held in New York in 1998: “The 1st ‘Vernacular’ Photo Fair.” In the same conference proceedings, Batchen proposes that, having done the job of focusing attention on “what has always been neglected,” it now be abandoned: “[T]hat way we can entirely focus our critical attention on what photographs do, rather than on what they are, or what they were” (p. 39).)

The Museum of Modern Art currently distinguishes vernacular photography from both fine-art photography and professional photography, singling out snapshots in particular: it defines vernacular photography as "[i]mages by amateur photographers of everyday life and subjects, commonly in the form of snapshots. The term is often used to distinguish everyday photography from fine art photography." Similarly, the Ackland Art Museum (University of North Carolina at Chapel Hill) defines vernacular photographs as "those that are made by individuals, typically presumed to be non-artists, for a wide variety of reasons, including snapshots of everyday subjects taken for personal pleasure."

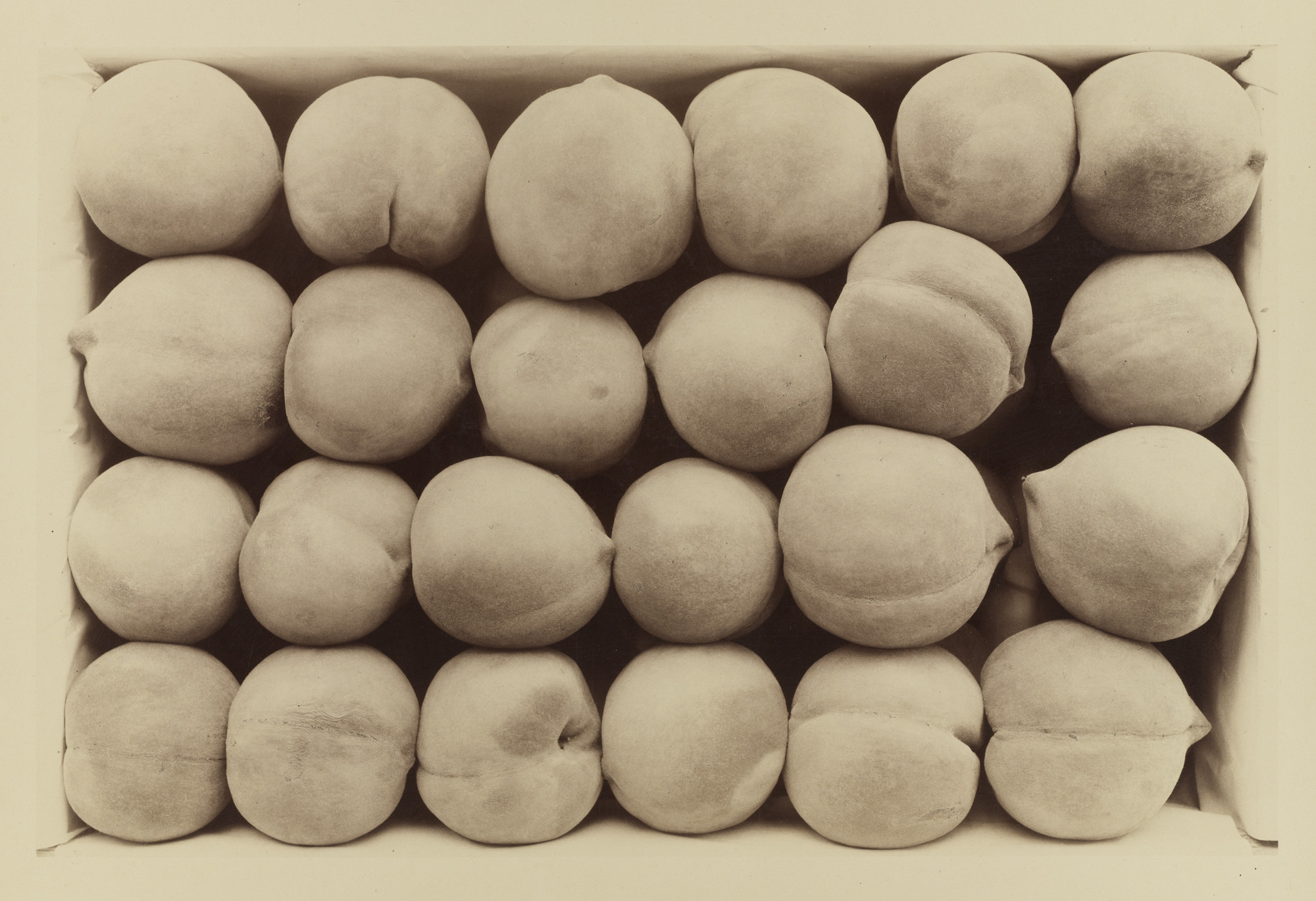
Commercial albumen print of cling peaches by Carleton Watkins, 1889

In a second definition elsewhere on its website, the Museum of Modern Art broadens vernacular photography to include all manner of non-art photographs made "for a huge range of purposes, including commercial, scientific, forensic, governmental, and personal." The Art Institute of Chicago agrees, referring to vernacular photography as "those countless ordinary and utilitarian pictures made for souvenir postcards, government archives, police case files, pin-up posters, networking Web sites, and the pages of magazines, newspapers, or family albums."

All the usages broadly carry on Batchen's rethinking of the underlying photographic material. Like the related terms vernacular music and vernacular architecture, "vernacular photography" under all interpretations not only directs attention to forms that until recently have been ignored by "the museum or the academy," but also puts the focus on the social contexts in which the photos were originally made. At least in critical and curatorial use, (Note: E.g. Campt et al. 2020.) the term largely supersedes the earlier "found photography," which was most concerned with the eye of the finder. "Found photos" were aesthetic recontextualizations or reinterpretations by artists. By contrast, the current "vernacular photos" are not being taken out of context or reinterpreted, and in most cases they claim no aesthetic value; they simply document some presumably overlooked aspect of social or photo history.

Vernacular photography is also to be distinguished from amateur photography. While vernacular photography is generally situated outside received art categories (though where the lines are drawn may vary), "amateur photography" contrasts with "professional photography": "[A]mateur [photography] simply means that you make your living doing something else" (see also photographer).

== Vernacular photography in museums ==
Museums in the United States have been exhibiting snapshots since 1998. Snapshots and related genres are now commonly billed and discussed as vernacular photography.

The American collector Peter J. Cohen currently dominates vernacular photography in U.S. museums. Major museum exhibitions have not yet been mounted outside the United States.

== Major museum exhibitions ==
Museum exhibitions highlighting vernacular photography have included:

- 1998: "Snapshots: The Photography of Everyday Life" at the San Francisco Museum of Modern Art
- 2000: "Other Pictures: Vernacular Photographs from the Thomas Walther Collection" at the Metropolitan Museum of Art
- 2007: "The Art of the American Snapshot, 1888–1978: From the Collection of Robert E. Jackson" at the National Gallery of Art.
- 2015–2016: "Unfinished Stories: Snapshots from the Peter J. Cohen Collection" at the Museum of Fine Arts, Boston
- 2017: "Representing: Vernacular Photographs of, by, and for African Americans" at the Portland Art Museum
- 2019: "Poetics of the Everyday: Amateur Photography, 1890–1970" at the Saint Louis Art Museum
- 2019–2020: "Lost and Found: Stories for Vernacular Photographs" at the Ackland Art Museum

== Bibliography ==
- Batchen, Geoffrey. Each Wild Idea: Writing, Photography, History. Cambridge, MA: MIT Press, 2002.
- Batchen, Geoffrey. Forget Me Not: Photography and Remembrance. New York: Princeton Architectural Press, 2004.
- Cutshaw, Stacey McCarroll. In the Vernacular: Photography of the Everyday. Boston: Boston University Art Gallery, 2008.
- Goranin, Näkki. American Photobooth. New York: W.W. Norton, 2008.
- Greenough, Sarah et al. The Art of the American Snapshot, 1888–1978: From the Collection of Robert E. Jackson. Washington, DC: National Gallery of Art, 2007.
- Hinde, John & Martin Parr (ed.). Our True Intent Is All For Your Delight: The John Hinde Butlin's Photographs. London: Chris Boot, 2003.
- Hines, Babette. Photobooth. New York: Princeton Architectural Press, 2002.
- Levine, Barbara. Snapshot Chronicles: Inventing the American Photo Album. New York: Princeton Architectural Press, 2006.
- Michaelson, Mark, & Steven Kasher (eds.). Least Wanted: A Century of American Mugshots. Göttingen: Steidl & New York: Steven Kasher Gallery, 2006.
- Morgan, Hal. Prairie Fires and Paper Moons: The American Photographic Postcard, 1900–1920. Boston: D.R. Godine, 1981.
- Parr, Martin (ed.). Boring Postcards. London: Phaidon, 1999. (Followed by Boring Postcards USA, 2000; and Langweilige Postkarten, 2001, of Germany.)
- Stricherz, Guy. Americans in Kodachrome. Santa Fe: Twin Palms, 2002.
- Wolff, Letitia (ed.). Real Photo Postcards: Unbelievable Images from the Collection of Harvey Tulcensky. New York: Princeton Architectural Press, 2005.
