= Jessica Backhaus =

German photographer

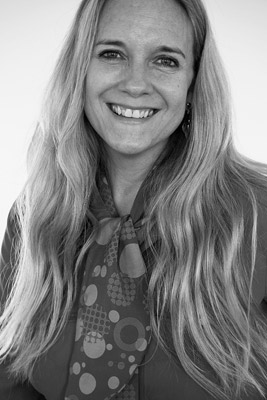
- Born: 1970 (age 54–55); Cuxhaven West Germany
- Occupation: photographer

Jessica Backhaus (born 1970) is a German photographer.

== Early life ==
Backhaus was born in 1970 Cuxhaven, Germany. In 1986 she moved to Paris. In 1992, at the age of 22, she met the French photographer Gisèle Freund, who became a friend and influential mentor.

== Career ==
Her work is held in the collections of the Museum of Fine Arts Houston and the Yale University Art Gallery.

== Photo books ==
- Jesus and the Cherries (2005)
- What Still Remains (2008)
- One Day in November (2008)
- I Wanted to See the World (2011)
