= Tobias Zielony =

German photographer and filmmaker (born 1973)

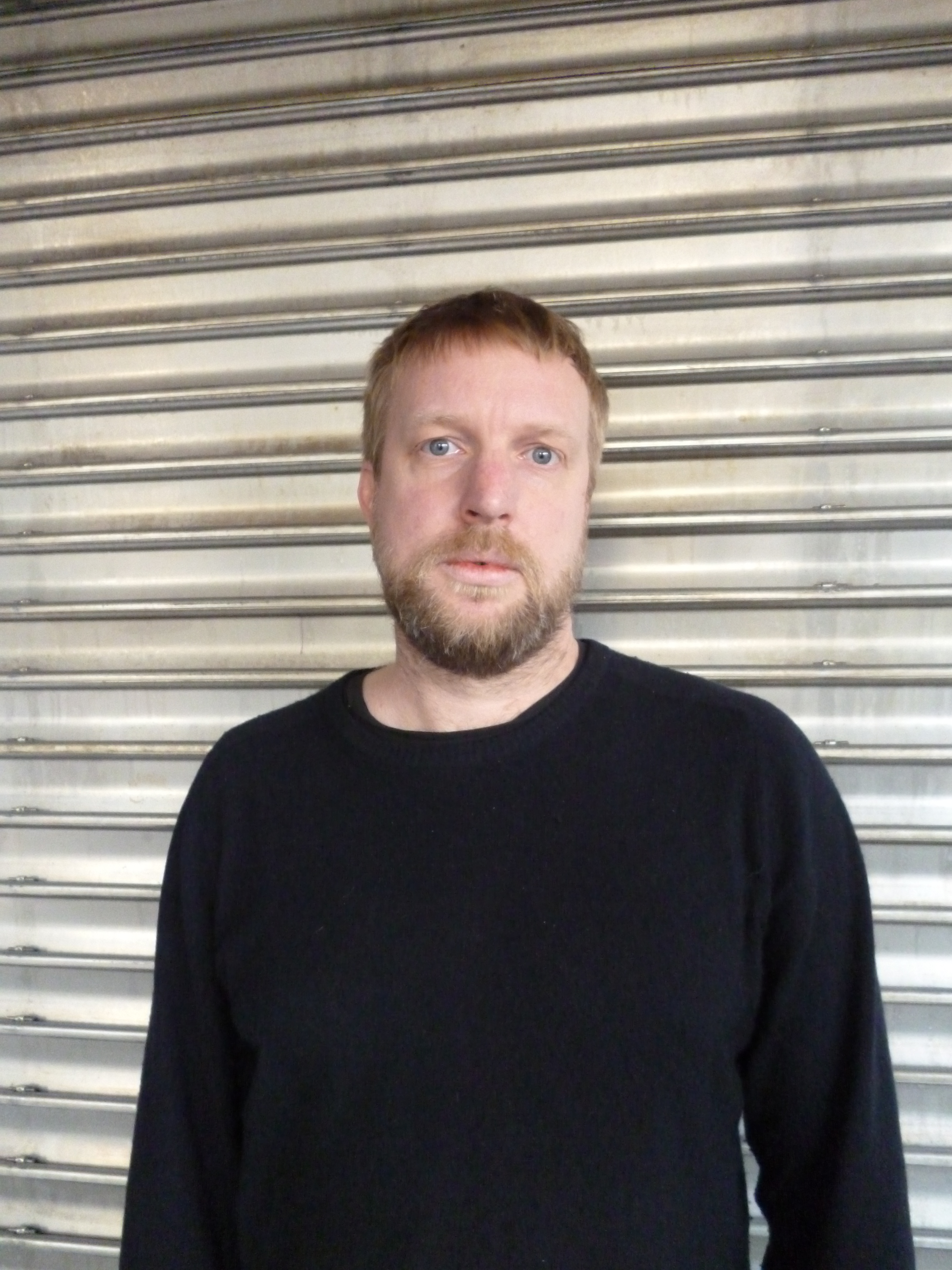
- Zielony in 2015
- Born: 1973 (age 52–53); Wuppertal, Germany
- Education: University of Wales, Newport, Academy of Fine Arts Leipzig
- Occupation: Photographer

Tobias Zielony (born 1973) is a German photographer and short filmmaker, living in Berlin. He has made work about communities at the margins of society, such as young people. In 2015, Zielony's series on African refugees in Germany, the Citizen, co-represented the country at the Venice Biennale and was shortlisted for the Deutsche Börse Photography Foundation Prize. He had a mid-career retrospective at Museum Folkwang in Essen, Germany in 2021 and his work is held in the collection of Philadelphia Museum of Art.

== Biography ==
Zielony was born in Wuppertal, Germany. From 1998 to 2001, he studied documentary photography at the University of Wales, Newport in Wales. From 2001 to 2006, he studied at the Academy of Fine Arts Leipzig. He now lives in Berlin.

== Publications ==
=== Books by Zielony ===
- Behind the Block. Leipzig: Institut für Buchkunst, 2004. ISBN 978-3-9328-6537-4.
- Tobias Zielony. Marion-Ermer-Preis; Universitätsverlag, Weimar, 2004. ISBN 978-3-8606-8238-8.
- The Cast. Berlin: C/O Berlin; Deutscher Kunstverlag, 2007. ISBN 978-3-4220-6626-7.
- Trona: Armpit of America. Leipzig: Spector, 2008. ISBN 978-3940-06400-4.
- Story / No Story. Ostfildern: Hatje Cantz, 2010. ISBN 978-3-7757-2284-1.
- Manitoba. Leipzig: Spector, 2011. ISBN 978-3-9400-6493-6.
- Jenny Jenny. Leipzig: Spector, 2013. ISBN 978-3-9446-6900-7.
- Vele. Leipzig: Spector, 2014. ISBN 978-3-9446-6953-3.
- The Fall. Leipzig: Spector, 2021. ISBN 9783959055321. A series of six books, each including a text or work of fiction by one of Dora Koderhold, Joshua Groß , Sophia Eisenhut, Enis Maci, Mazlum Nergiz and Jakob Nolte. Published on the occasion of a retrospective exhibition at Museum Folkwang. In English and German.

== Films ==
- Big Sexyland (2008) – 3 mins
- The Deboard (2008) – 8 mins
- Le Vele di Scampia (2009) – 9 mins
- Der Brief (The Letter) (2013) – 5 mins
- Kalandia Kustom Kar Kommandos (Dream Lover) (2014) – 4 mins
- Al-Akrab (2014) – 7 mins
- Tamil Stars (2016) – 9 mins
- Alles (Chemnitz) (2002, 2017) – 6 mins
- Maskirovka (2018) – 8 mins

== Exhibitions ==
=== Solo exhibitions ===
- Tobias Zielony. The Fall, Museum Folkwang, Essen, Germany, 2021. A mid-career retrospective of photography and video.

=== Group exhibitions ===
- German pavilion, 55th Venice Biennale, Venice, Italy, 2015. Curated by Florian Ebner.

== Awards ==
- One of four shortlisted, Deutsche Börse Photography Foundation Prize, London, 2015 for the Citizen

== Collections ==
Zielony's work is held in the following permanent collection:

- Philadelphia Museum of Art, Philadelphia, Pennsylvania: 5 prints (as of 25 September 2022)
