= 2018 in art =

The year 2018 in art involved various significant events.

== Events ==
- February 16 - Edgar Degas's 1877 pastel Les Choristes, stolen from the Musée Cantini in Marseille at the end of 2009, is found in the luggage compartment of an intercity bus outside Paris during a search by customs officials.
- April - The Terrus museum at Elne in the south of France, dedicated to paintings by Étienne Terrus, discovers that half its collection, 82 works, is counterfeit.
- April 21 - The Institute for Contemporary Art at VCU in Richmond, Virginia designed by Steven Holl opens to the public.
- May - The Collection of Peggy Rockefeller and David Rockefeller is auctioned off in three sales at Christie's, Rockefeller Center, New York City. On the evening of May 8 the first night of the sale Young Girl with a Flower Basket (oil on canvas, 1905) by Pablo Picasso is sold for $US115 million. along with world record prices for works by Claude Monet (Nymphéas en fleur 1914-1917 $84.7 million) and Henri Matisse (Odalisque couchée aux magnolias 1923 $80.7 million), all contributing to a new world record for a single collection at auction of $832.6 million, the record previously having been held by the $484 million total achieved for the art collection of Pierre Berge and Yves Saint Laurent.
- May 25 - Second attack on Ilya Repin's painting Ivan the Terrible and His Son Ivan in the Tretyakov Gallery, Moscow, by an inebriated visitor.
- June 15 - Second major fire at Glasgow School of Art.
- July - A 1967 painting, "Untitled" by Robert Motherwell missing for more than forty years is returned after apparently having been stolen by a ring of art thieves.
- August 13 - Despite warning signs, a man in his sixties is hospitalized after falling into a cavity created in a gallery floor at the Serralves Museum in Porto, Portugal, for the 1992 Anish Kapoor work "Descent into Limbo" (titled after the 1492 painting by Andrea Mantegna).
- October 5 - A version of Banksy's artwork Balloon Girl is auctioned at Sotheby's in London for £1,042,000. Moments after the closing bid, the artwork partially shreds itself by means of a paper shredder hidden in the frame to become Love Is in the Bin.
- November 14 - At a sale of the art collection of Barney A. Ebsworth at Christie's New York, Edward Hopper's Chop Suey (1929) sells for US$92m and Willem de Kooning's Woman as Landscape (1955) for US$68.9m.
- November 15 - A canvas by David Hockney, Portrait of an Artist (Pool with Two Figures) (1972) sells at Christies in New York City for $90.3 million US dollars with fees, thus shattering the previous record for the most expensive work of art by a living artist ever sold at auction. The record price was previously held by a "Balloon Dog (orange)" sculpture by Jeff Koons for $58.4 million also at Christies in New York City in 2013.
- December 1 - The Galerie nationale du Jeu de Paume museum in Paris is torched in politically related mob violence as the Tuileries Gardens are stormed by protestors.
- December 7 - In the United States of America, the National Rifle Association of America (NRA), the defendant in a lawsuit brought by artist Anish Kapoor, settles with the plaintiff in the case. Therein the gun lobby group had without the sculptor's consent used a filmed image of his work in an approximately one minute long promotional video called "The Violence of Lies". Kapoor says of the victory which is inclusive of having the image of his work removed from the NRA's film that "They have now complied with our demand to remove the unauthorized image of my sculpture Cloud Gate from their abhorrent video, which seeks to promote fear, hostility, and division in American society.”

== Exhibitions ==
- February 9 until May 9 - "Danh Vo: Take My Breath Away" at the Solomon R. Guggenheim Museum in New York City.
- February 13 until May 27 - "Songs for Sabotage" The fourth New Museum Triennial curated by Gary Carrion-Murayari and Alex Gartenfeld at the New Museum in New York City.
- February 15 until May 27 - "The Paston Treasure: Microcosm of the Known World" at the Yale Center for British Art in New Haven, Connecticut and then June 23 until September 23 at the Norwich Castle Museum and Art Gallery in Norwich, England.
- March 2 until June 10 - "Grant Wood: American Gothic and Other Fables" at the Whitney Museum of American Art in New York City.
- April 4 until April 8 - Lynn Gilbert: “Women: A Time Capsule of the American Feminist Movement at Thockmorton art in New York City.
- May 12 until September 9 - "Archibald Prize, Wynne Prize, Sir John Sulman Prize" at the Art Gallery of New South Wales in Sydney.
- May 23 until September 23 - "Canova's George Washington" at the Frick Collection in New York City curated by Xavier Solomon and Mario Guderzo then traveled to the Gipsoteca Canoviana at the Museo Canova in Possagno, Italy from November 10 to April 22, 2019.
- May 26 until January 1, 2019 - "Bodys Isek Kingelez: City Dreams" at the Museum of Modern Art in New York City.
- June 6 - September 12 - "Giacometti" at the Solomon R. Guggenheim Museum in New York City.
- June 8 until September 3 - "Charles White: A Retrospective at the Art Institute of Chicago in Chicago, Illinois then traveled to the Museum of Modern Art in New York City from October 7 until January 13, 2019.
- June 9 until September 3 - "Women Artists in Paris, 1850 - 1900" at the Clark Art Institute in Williamstown, Massachusetts.
- September 6 until December 8 - "NeoRealismo: The New Image in Italy, 1932–1960" at the Grey Art Gallery at New York University in New York City.
- September 17 until January 6, 2019 - "Delacroix" at the Metropolitan Museum of Art.
- September 22 until January 2, 2019 - "Armenia!" at the Metropolitan Museum of Art in New York City.
- September 26 until January 9, 2018 - "Sarah Lucas: Au Naturel" at the New Museum of Contemporary Art in New York City.
- October 2 until January 13, 2019 - "Breughel" at the Kunsthistoriches Museum in Vienna, Austria.
- October 10 until October 25 -Abloh and Murakami: America Too at the Gagosian Gallery in Beverly Hills, California.
- October 12 until April 23, 2019 - "Hilma af Klint: Paintings for the Future" at the Solomon R. Guggenheim Museum in New York City.
- October 17 until January 9, 2019 - "Hedges, Edges, Dirt" at the Institute for Contemporary Art at VCU in Richmond, Virginia.
- October 30 until January 25, 2019 - "Robert Morris: Banners an Curses" at the Castelli Gallery in New York City.
- November 9 until January 9, 2019 - Calder/Kelly at the Lévy Gorvy Gallery in New York City.
- November 12 until March 31, 2019 - "Andy Warhol - From A to B and Back Again" at the Whitney Museum of American Art in New York City.
- December 11 until March 10, 2019 - "Museo del Prado: A place of memory 1819 - 2019 at the Pado in Madrid, Spain.
- December 22 until April 7th, 2019 - "The Essential Duchamp", at the Museum of Modern and Contemporary Art, Seoul

== Works ==
- Banksy
  - Bowery Mural in New York City.
  - Love Is in the Bin.
  - Season's Greetings mural in Port Talbot.
- Phyllida Barlow - "Prop" commissioned for installation along the High Line in Manhattan, New York City.
- Mark Bradford Deep Blue.
- Christo - "The London Mastaba" on The Serpentine in London, England.
- Martin Dawe - "Continuing the Conversation" on the main campus of the Georgia Institute of Technology in Atlanta.
- Chen Dongfang - "The Song of Dragon and Flowers" on Doyers Street in Chinatown, Manhattan, New York City.
- Tristan Eaton - "Intermission" on the Bowery Mural wall in Manhattan, New York City.
- Tracey Emin - "I Want My Time With You", light installation at St Pancras railway station, London.
- Rachel Feinstein "Angels".
- Derek Fordjour - "Half Mast" (mural) at the Whitney Museum of American Art in New York City.
- Stephen Glasborow - Statue of Johnny Famechon in Ballam Park in Frankston City, Victoria, Australia.
- David Hockney - The Queen's Window, Westminster Abbey, London (stained glass).
- Ellsworth Kelly - "Austin" conceived and designed in 2015 completed and opened to the public in 2018 at the Blanton Museum of Art at the University of Texas at Austin in Austin, Texas.
- Jeff Koons - Cork Couple (completed).
- Donald Lipski - "Spot" installed in front of Hassenfield Children's Hospital at the Langone Medical Center in New York City.
- James and Karla Murray - "Moms-and-Pops of the L.E.S." installed in Seward Park on the Lower East Side in Manhattan, New York City.
- Yoko Ono - "Sky" (mosaics) inside the subway station at 72nd street and Broadway in Manhattan, New York City.
- PLAYLAB - "Grownup Flowers" a multisite sculptural installation along the Avenue of the Americas in New York City.
- Ellie Sachs and Matt Starr - "The Museum of Banned Objects" installation in the gallery of the Ace Hotel in New York City
- Rafael San Juan - Reminiscencia.
- Okuda San Miguel Air Land Sea a series of seven sculptures permanently installed in and around the Boston Seaport in Boston, Massachusetts.
- Amy Sherald - "First Lady Michelle Obama" created for and on permanent exhibit at the National Portrait Gallery in, Washington D.C.
- Andrew Sinclair - Statue of David Bowie (Aylesbury, England).
- Jennifer Steinkamp - "Blind Eye" created for and exhibited at the Clark Art Institute in Williamstown, Massachusetts.
- Ram V. Sutar - Statue of Unity in Gujarat, India.
- Gillian Wearing - Statue of Millicent Fawcett in Parliament Square, London.

== Photography ==
- Director Libuše Rudínská made a feature-length documentary on the life and work of Jindřich Štreit on the body. The premiere of the film took place on 27 February in the Metropol cinema in Olomouc.
- Prague Photo, April
- Mesiac fotografie, Bratislava
- International photo festival in Lodz, May
- photokina, Cologne, September
- 116th Congress Fédération photographique de France, the beginning of May
- 49th Rencontres d'Arles, July - September
- 22nd Festival international de la photo animalière et de nature, Montier-en-Der, every third Thursday in November
- Salon de la photo, Paris, November
- Mois de la Photo, Paris, November
- Paris Photo, November
- Visa pour l'image, Perpignan, start of September
- Nordic Light, Kristiansund Municipality, Norway
- 33rd Congress of FIAP

== Awards ==
- The Archibald Prize - Yvette Coppersmith for "Self Portrait"
- The Hugo Boss Prize - Simone Leigh
- The John Moores Painting Prize - Jacqui Hallum for "King and Queen of Wands"

=== Photography ===
- Czech Press Photo – Lukáš Zeman
- World Press Photo – Ronaldo Schemidt and Agence France Presse
- Prix Niépce – Stéphane Lavoué
- Prix HSBC pour la photographie – Antoine Bruy and Petros Efstathiadis
- Prix Lucas Dolega – Narciso Contreras
- Oskar Barnack Award – Max Pinckers and Mary Gelman
- W. Eugene Smith Grant in Humanistic Photography – Mark Peterson
- Pulitzer Prize for Breaking News Photography – Ryan Kelly from The Daily Progress
- Pulitzer Prize for Feature Photography – Reuters photographers
- Infinity Awards – Bruce Davidson, Dayanita Singh, Amber Bracken, Samuel Fosso, Alexandra Bell, Natalie Keyssar, and Maurice Berger.
- Hasselblad Award – Oscar Muñoz
- Bowness Photography Prize – Hoda Afshar

== Films and stage musicals ==
- At Eternity's Gate
- Botero
- Lempicka
- Never Look Away
- The Price of Everything

== Deaths ==
- January 1 - Mauro Staccioli, 80, Italian sculptor
- January 2 - Betty Woodman, 87, American ceramic artist
- January 4 - Vladimir Yankilevsky, 79, Russian artist
- January 5 - Carlo Pedretti, 89, Italian art historian (Leonardo da Vinci)
- January 8 - Kynaston McShine, 82, American museum curator
- January 15 - William Scharf, 90, American artist
- January 17 - Ed Moses, 91, American artist
- January 21 - Jack Whitten, 78, American artist
- January 28 - Robert Pincus-Witten, 82, American art critic, curator and art historian
- February 1 - Sonia Gechtoff, 91, American artist
- February 12 - Jef Geys, 83, Belgian artist
- February 18
  - Peggy Cooper Cafritz, 70, American art collector and philanthropist
  - Elmar Rojas, 75, Guatemalan artist
- February 19 - Teresa Gisbert Carbonell, 91, Bolivian architect and art historian
- February 22 - Gladys Maccabe, 99, Northern Irish painter
- February 24 - Getulio Alviani, 78, Italian painter
- March 2 - Gillo Dorfles, 107, Italian art critic, art historian and painter
- March 21 - Frank Gaylord, 93, American sculptor ("The Column" sculptural tableaux part of the Korean War Veterans Memorial in Washington D.C.)
- March 6 - Ferdousi Priyabhashini, 70, Bangladeshi sculptor
- March 24 - Hidetoshi Nagasawa, 77, Japanese sculptor and architect
- April 9 - Barney A. Ebsworth, 83, American art collector
- April 11 - Gillian Ayres, 88, English painter
- April 17 - Marcia Hafif, 89, American painter
- April 24 - Hariton Pushwagner, 77, Norwegian pop artist
- April 28 - Laura Aguilar, 58, American photographer
- April 30 - Geneviève Claisse, 82, French painter
- May 9 - Per Kirkeby, 79, Danish artist
- May 14 - Tom Wolfe, 88, American author and art critic (The Painted Word)
- May 19 - Robert Indiana, 89, American artist
- May 20 - Bill Gold, 97, American film poster artist
- May 26 -
  - Alan Bean, 86, American astronaut and painter
  - Gregg Juarez, 94, American art dealer and philanthropist
- June 1 - Malcolm Morley, 86, British painter
- June 2 - Irving Sandler, 92, American art historian
- June 7
  - David Douglas Duncan, 102, American photojournalist
  - Michaele Vollbracht, 70, American illustrator and designer
- June 13 - Milan Mrkusich, 93, New Zealand artist and designer
- June 16 - Darío Villalba, 79, Spanish painter and photographer.
- June 25 - David Goldblatt, 87, South African photographer (death announced on this date)
- June 26 - Sabina Ott, 62, American artist
- July 1 - Armando, 88, Dutch painter, sculptor and writer
- July 23 - Oksana Shachko, 31 Ukrainian artist and activist (FEMEN)
- July 25 - Giancarlo Vitali, 88, Italian painter and engraver
- August 1 - Cui Xiuwen, 47 or 48, Chinese artist
- August 20 - Charles Blackman, 90, Australian painter
- August 24 - Krishna Reddy, 93, Indian artist
- August 27 - Mirka Mora, 90, French-born Australian artist and cultural figure
- August 28 - Silvano Campeggi, 95, Italian film poster designer (Casablanca, Singin' in the Rain, Breakfast at Tiffany's)
- August 30
  - Marie Severin, 89, American comics artist and colorist
  - Paul Taylor, 88, American choreographer and artistic collaborator with Robert Rauschenberg and Alex Katz
- September 1 - Irving Petlin, 83, American artist
- September 11 - Tchan Fou-li, 102, Chinese photographer
- September 17 - Annette Michelson, 96, American art critic (co-founder of October) and film critic (death announced on this date)
- September 18 - Robert Venturi, 93, American architect, Pritzker Prize winner (1991) and co-author with Denise Scott Brown of "Learning from Las Vegas"
- September 19 - Geta Brătescu, 92, Romanian visual artist
- September 20 - Henry Wessel Jr., 76, American photographer
- September 23 - Jane Fortune, American art writer (Invisible Women: Forgotten Artists of Florence) and philanthropist
- September 26 - Helena Almeida, 84, Portuguese painter and photographer
- October 1 - Shirin Aliabadi, 44–45, Iranian visual artist
- October 3 - Wen Fong, 88, Chinese-American art historian
- October 10 - Angelo Marino, 62, Italian art curator
- October 11 -
  - Milton Gendel, 99, American-Italian photographer and art critic (ARTnews)
  - Anatoli Levitin, 96, Russian painter and art educator
  - Pran Nevile, 95, Indian art historian
- October 12 - Takehisa Kosugi, 80, Japanese composer and violinist associated with the Fluxus movement
- October 14 -
  - Eduardo Arroyo, 81, Spanish painter, set designer and writer
  - Mel Ramos, 83, American painter
- October 15 - Paul Allen, 65, American businessman, art collector and philanthropist
- October 17 - Jacques Monory, 94, French painter and filmmaker
- October 21 - Harold Stevenson, 89, American painter
- November 4 - Karl-Heinz Adler, 91. German artist
- November 12 - Stan Lee, 95, American comic book artist
- November 13 - Richard Fremantle, 82, American art historian (Masacio)
- November 15 - Lubomir Tomaszewski, 95, Polish-American artist
- November 16 - Francisco Calvo Serraller, 70, Spanish art historian
- November 18 - Walter S. Gibson, 86, American art historian
- November 18 - Peter Peryer, 77, New Zealand photographer
- November 21 - Jan-Lauritz Opstad, 68, Norwegian art historian and museum director
- November 23 - Mariano Bellver, 92, Spanish art patron
- November 26 - Tomás Maldonado, 96, Argentine painter and designer
- November 28 - Robert Morris, 87, American sculptor
- December 1 - Vivian Lynn, 87, New Zealand artist
- December 8 - Enrico Crispolti, 85, Italian art critic and historian
- December 26 - Wendy Beckett (aka Sister Wendy), 88, British religious sister and art historian
- December 27 - Jean Dumontier, 83, Canadian-Quebecois Architect and artist (the Montreal Metro stations Jean-Drapeau and Longueuil–Université-de-Sherbrooke)
- December 29 - Norbert Kox, 73, American outsider artist
