= Hornstra =

Hornstra is a surname. Notable people with the surname include:

- Inge Hornstra (born 1974), Dutch-born Australian actress
- Rob Hornstra (born 1975), Dutch photographer
