= Rob Hornstra =

Dutch photographer

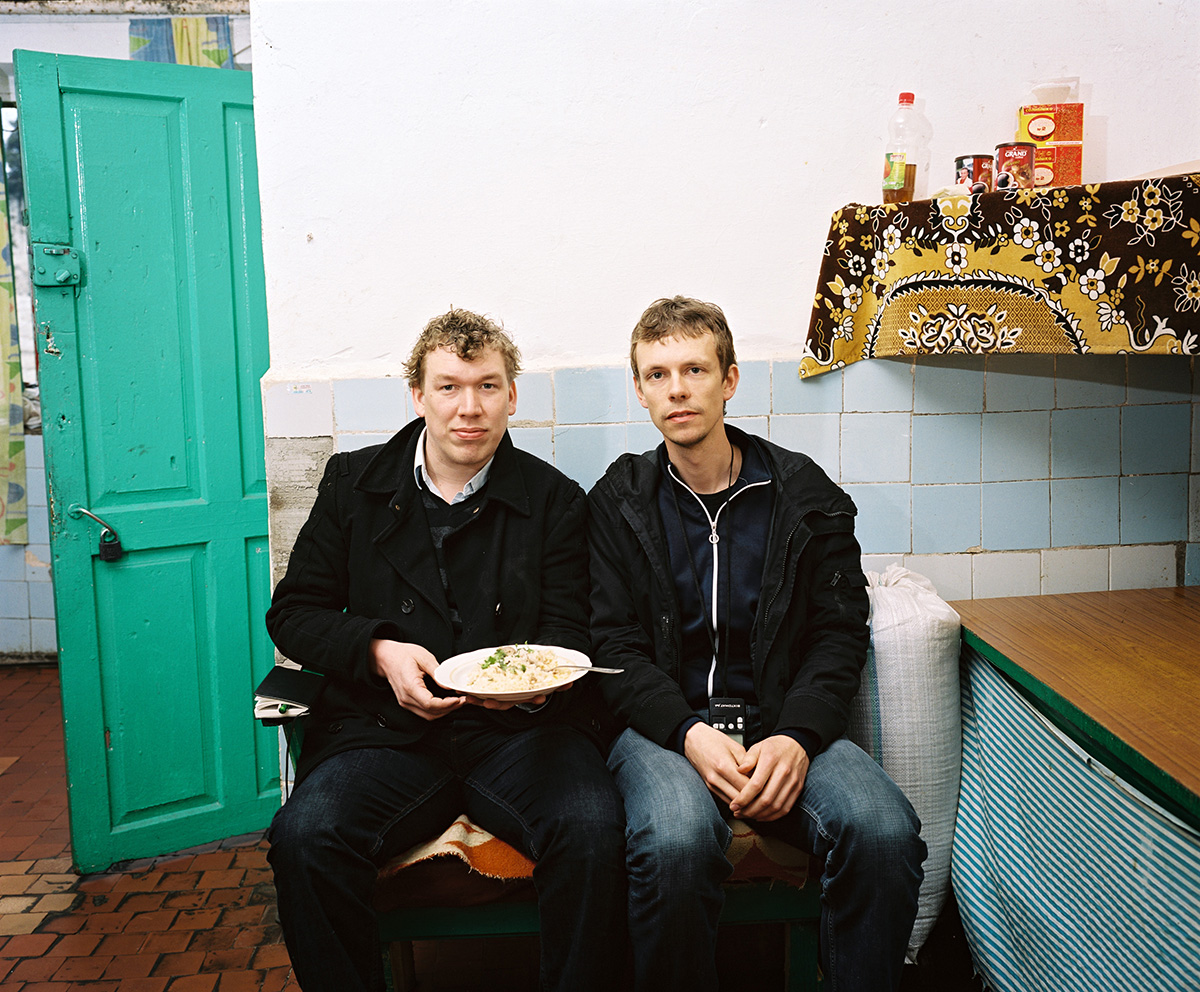
Rob Hornstra (right) with the writer Arnold van Bruggen in Dranda, Abkhazia's only prison, while doing research for the Sochi Project

Rob Hornstra (born 1975) is a Dutch photographer and self-publisher of documentary work, particularly of areas of the former Soviet Union.

== Early life ==
Hornstra was born in Borne, Overijssel, Netherlands.

== Career ==
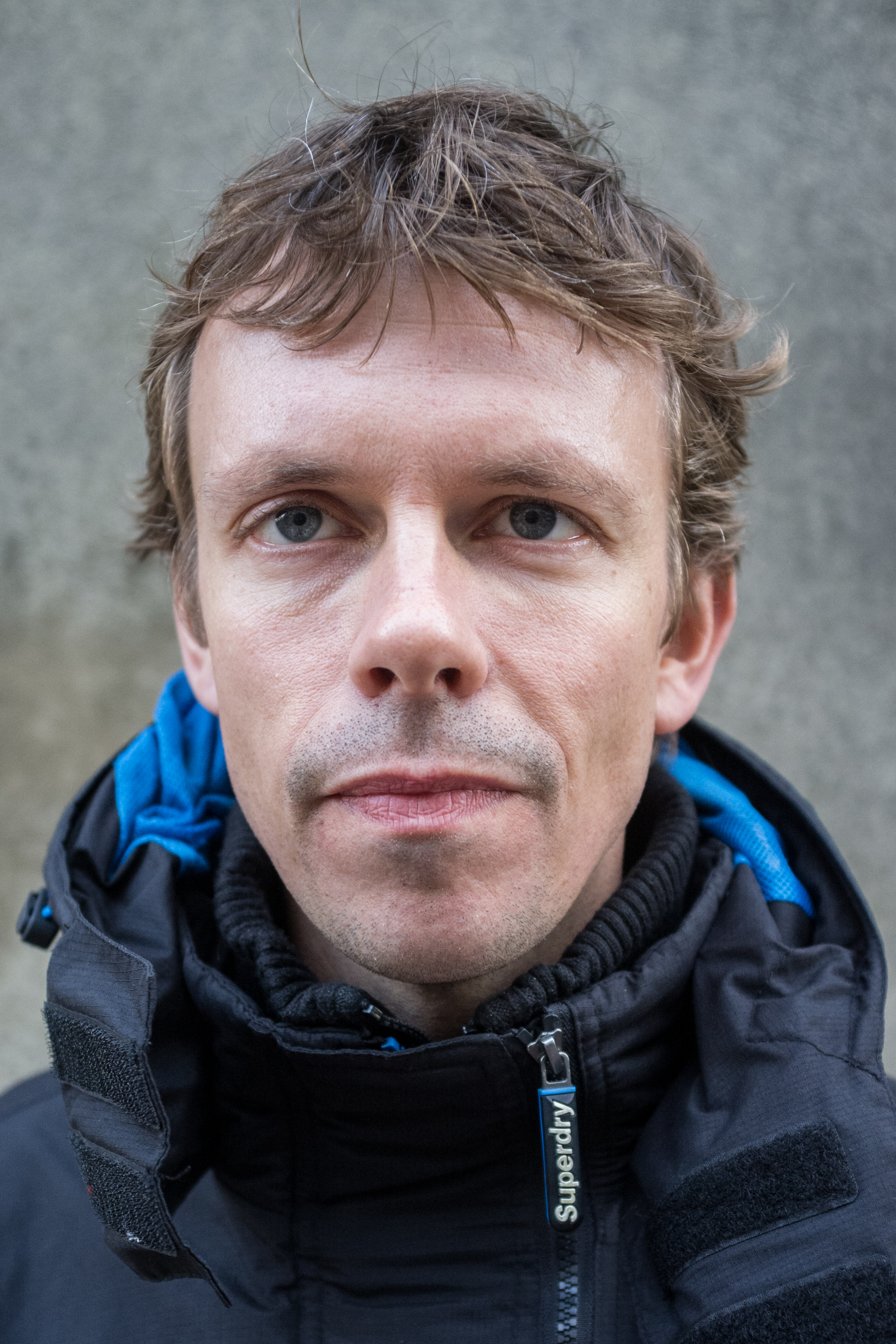
Hornstra in 2014

Hornstra studied Social and Legal Services at Utrecht University of Applied Sciences from 1994 to 1998; for a year from summer 1996, he interned and then worked as a probation officer. From September 1998, he worked for over eight years as a host and bartender at Muziekcentrum Vredenburg in Utrecht. From 1999 to 2004, he studied photographic design at Utrecht School of the Arts.

For his graduation project he spent one month in Russia photographing the lives of the first generation of young people growing up after the fall of communism. In the same year that he graduated he published this series as his first book, Communism and Cowgirls.

Since graduation Hornstra has combined editorial work for newspapers and magazines with more personal, longer-term documentary work in the Netherlands, Iceland, and the former Soviet Union. Hornstra considers himself a maker of photographic documentaries rather than a photographer; when not photographing for a particular purpose, he does not carry a camera. Further, he sees books as more important than exhibitions, and regards his own editing, publication and marketing of books of his photography as an important part of his work.

Hornstra prefers to work with film, in medium format or large format:

[It] takes me quite a bit of time to set up my Mamiya medium-format camera and Horseman large-format camera. And that allows me to shoot more spontaneous pictures. Yes, it sounds contradictory. But snapshots aren't always so spontaneous by any means. When people have to pose for a long time, they eventually relax. Then you can really take nice pictures of them.

In 2006, together with the art historian Femke Lutgerink, Hornstra started work on Fotodok, (Note: The organization always presents its name in full capitals: "FOTODOK".) an Utrecht-based organization that arranges exhibitions and other events for documentary photography. Itself inspired by Fotohof in Salzburg, Fotodok hopes eventually to create an exhibition space for documentary photography in Utrecht. Fotodok was launched in 2008; Hornstra stepped down as creative director in September 2009.

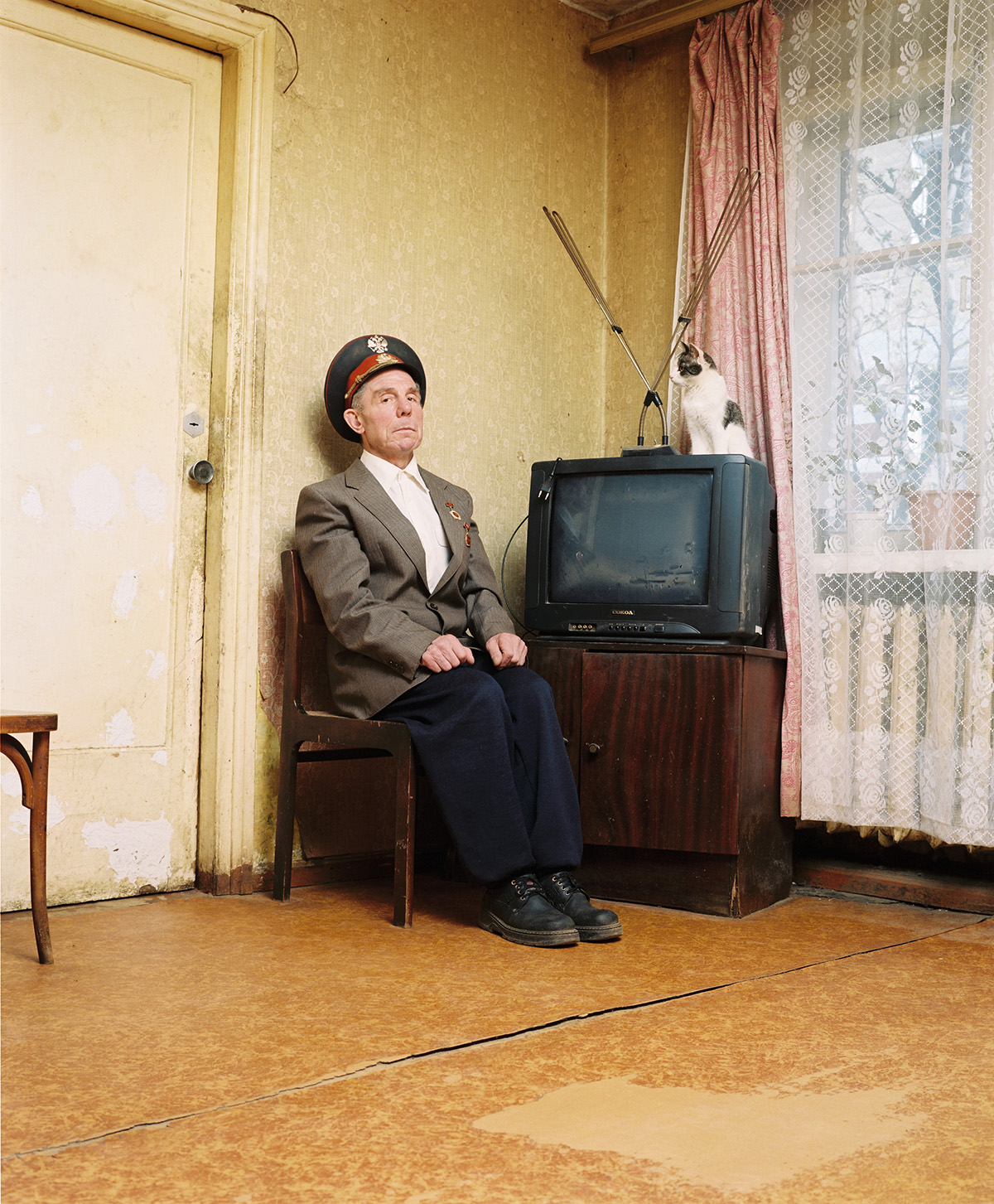
Aleksander Zelekson, a retired policeman, in his living room in Nizhny Novgorod, 2007; from the book 101 Billionaires (2008)

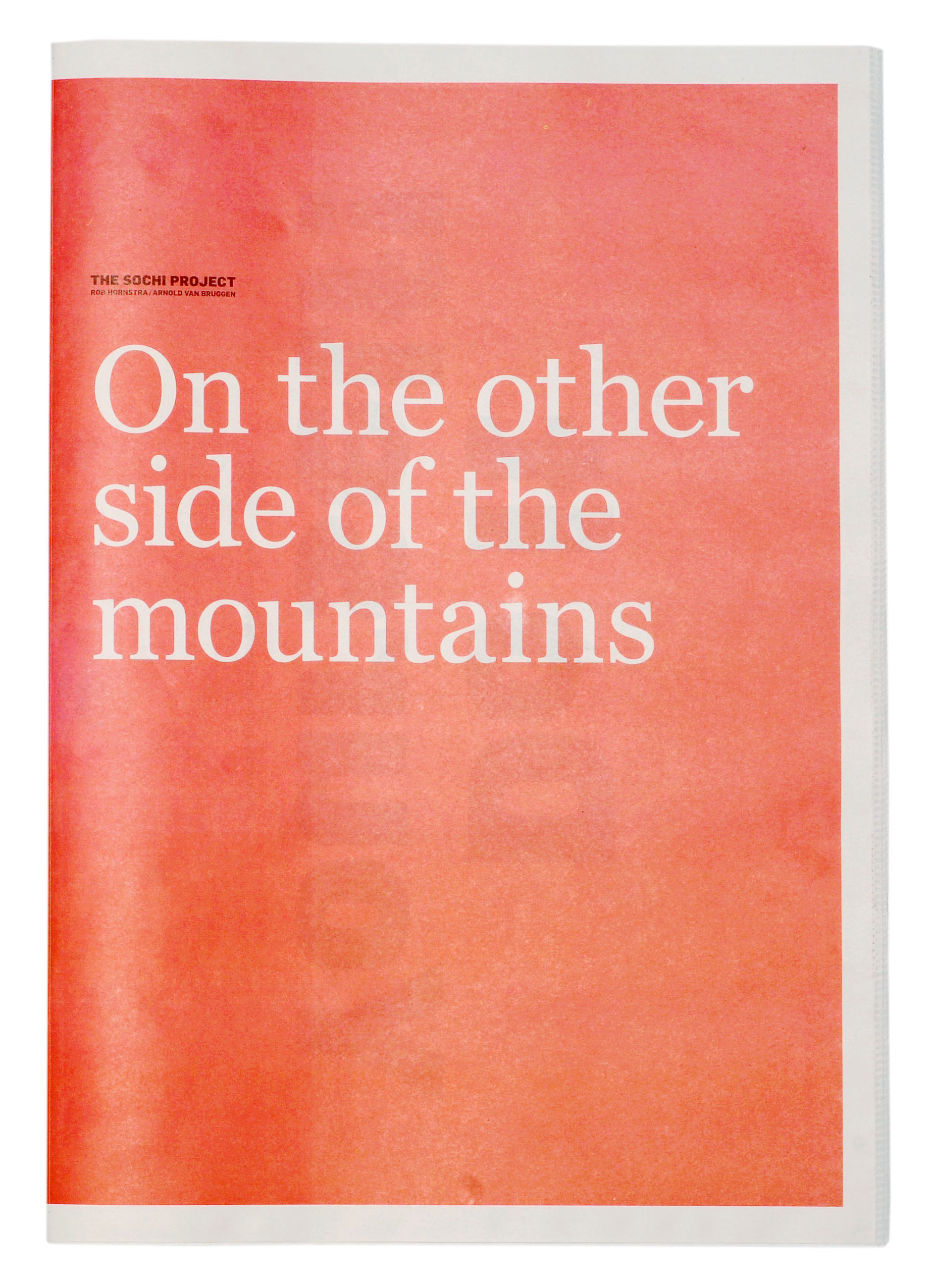
One copy of On the Other Side of the Mountains: half of what's needed for an exhibition

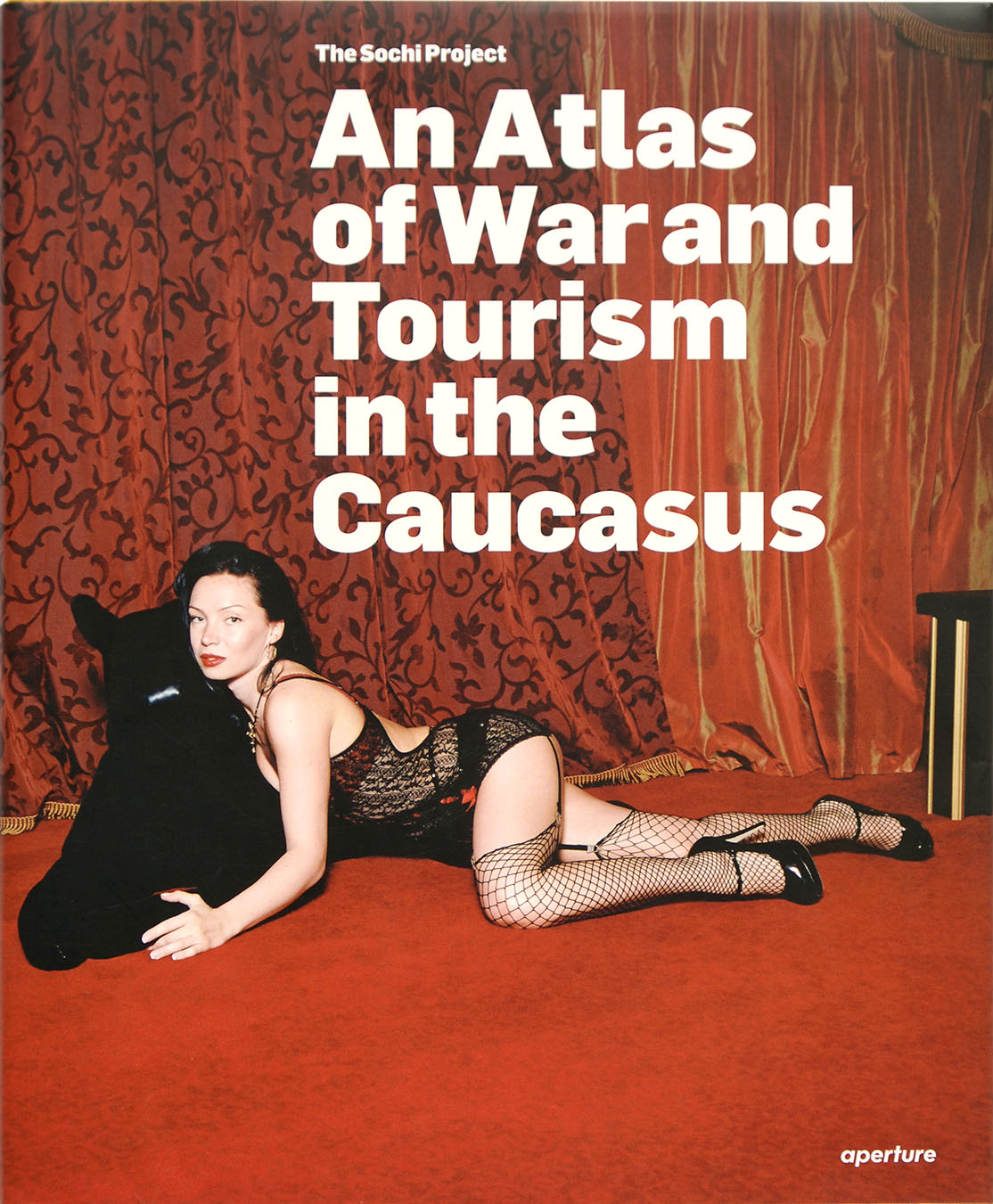
The book The Sochi Project: An Atlas of War and Tourism in the Caucasus (2013)

Starting with his first collection, Communism and Cowgirls, Hornstra has published his own books. These skip forewords by other writers, biographical notes, ISBNs and the other trappings of conventionally published books; by taking advance orders and selling copies directly and also working through a small number of retailers, Hornstra is able to avoid normal distribution channels.

Together with the writer and filmmaker Arnold van Bruggen, in 2009 Hornstra started the Sochi Project, which over five years would document the area of Sochi (Krasnodar Krai, Russia) and the changes to it during the preparation for the 2014 Winter Olympics. Hornstra and Van Bruggen express surprise that the site chosen for such a large winter event would be one so close to politically volatile areas such as Abkhazia and one that by Russian standards has exceptionally mild winters. Under the slogan slow journalism, the pair request donations from the public for the crowdfunding of a project whose timescale is impossible for the mass media. The stories Hornstra and Van Bruggen collected as part of the project have appeared in newspapers, photobooks and online over the course of the five-year period. The project culminated in the retrospective book An Atlas of War and Tourism in the Caucasus published by Aperture in 2013, and in 2014 an exhibition that toured Europe, America and Canada.

Hornstra and Van Bruggen have also created more democratic exhibitions, made entirely of newsprint, that can be shown on the walls of small galleries with no budget for framed prints or video installations: On the Other Side of the Mountains (2010), two copies of which create an exhibition; (Note: The Other Side of the Mountains can be viewed here (Issuu).) Paris Photo Newsprint Exhibition (2012), with thirty photographs; (Note: Paris Photo Newsprint Exhibition is described here in the Indie Photo Library.) and three versions of Billboard Sochi Singers, each containing the sheets to assemble either of two posters. (Note: A video illustration of how to create a poster is here (Vimeo).)

Critic Sean O'Hagan, writing in The Guardian, said "Whichever way you look at it, The Sochi Project is an incredible piece of journalism, both visual and written, and a glimpse of the medium's future."

In 2019, Hornstra and Van Bruggen announced the start of another long-term project: The Europeans, inspired by Henri Cartier-Bresson's 1955 book The Europeans and prompted by the recent rise of voters and regimes dissatisfied with the European ideal.

== Exhibitions ==
=== Solo exhibitions, and pair exhibitions with Arnold van Bruggen ===
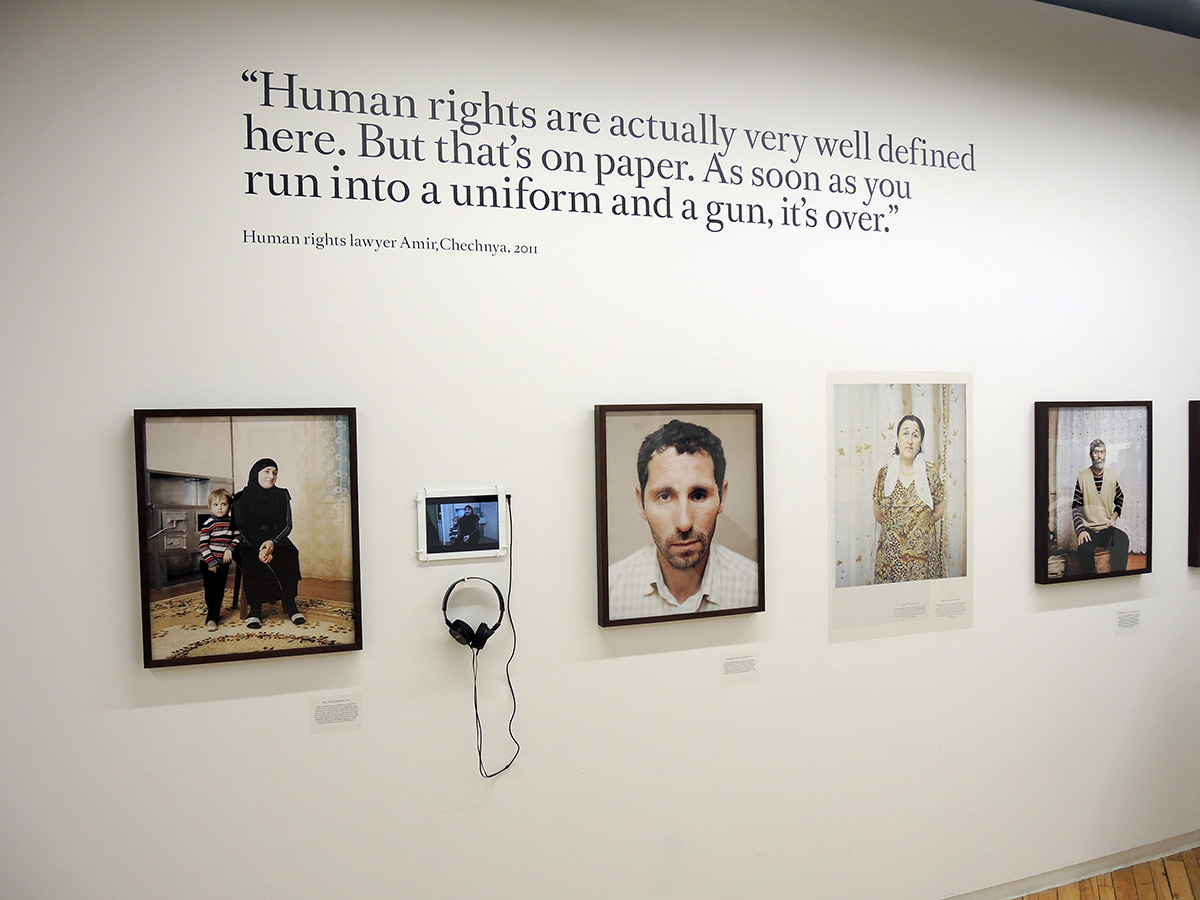
The Sochi Project: An Atlas of War and Tourism in the Caucasus at Contact Gallery, Toronto, in 2014

- Communism and Cowgirls, Fotohof, Salzburg, 2005.
- Communism and Cowgirls, De Balie, Amsterdam, 2006.
- Roots of the Rúntur, National Museum of Iceland, Reykjavík, 2006.
- 101 Billionaires and Other Stories, Flatland Gallery, Utrecht, 2009.
- The Sochi Project, Mandeep Photography, Rome; Spazio Labo' – Centro di Fotografia, Bologna, 2010.
- Views from Sochi. Third Floor Gallery, Cardiff, February–March 2011.
- Ivan's Cowshed and Putin's Games: A report on the current state of the Sochi Project. Freelens Gallery, Hamburg, April–May 2011.
- On the other side of the mountains. International Centre of Photography, Kristiansund, Norway; Nordic Light International Festival of Photography, May 2011.
- Empty Land, Promised Land, Forbidden Land. Savignano Immagini. Galleria Vicini, Savignano sul Rubicone, September 2011.
- Empty Land, Promised Land, Forbidden Land. Foto8, London, March–April 2012.
- Empty Land, Promised Land, Forbidden Land. FEM, HU University of Applied Sciences Utrecht, November–December 2012.
- The Secret History of Khava Gaisanova & The North Caucasus. Ti Pi Tin, London, May–June 2013.
- 101 Billionaires and the Sochi Project. Browse Foto-Festival, Berlin, June–July 2013.
- The Sochi Project. FotoDoc Center for Documentary Photography, Sakharov Center, Moscow, October 2013.
- The Sochi Project. Stadsschouwburg, Amsterdam, October 2013.
- The Sochi Project: An Atlas of War and Tourism in the Caucasus. FotoMuseum Antwerp, November 2013 – March 2014.
- Gouden Jaren: Rob Hornstra's Rusland / Golden Years: Rob Hornstra's Russia. Huis Marseille, Amsterdam, December 2013 – March 2014.
- The Sochi Project: An Atlas of War and Tourism in the Caucasus. DePaul Art Museum, DePaul University, Chicago, January–March 2014.
- The Sochi Project: An Atlas of War and Tourism in the Caucasus. Fotohof, Salzburg, January–March 2014.
- The Sochi Project: An Atlas of War and Tourism in the Caucasus. Noorderlicht, Groningen, April–June 2014.
- The Sochi Project: An Atlas of War and Tourism in the Caucasus. Contact Photography Festival, Toronto, May 2014.
- Ballets Russes. Flatland Gallery, Amsterdam, May–June 2014.
- The Sochi Project: An Atlas of War and Tourism in the Caucasus. Aperture Foundation, New York City, May–July 2014.
- The Sochi Project. PhotoIreland Festival, City Assembly House, Dublin, July 2014.
- The Sochi Project: Atlas of War and Tourism in the Caucasus. Kaunas Photo 2015, Mykolas Žilinskas Art Gallery (M. K. Čiurlionis National Art Museum), Kaunas, January–February 2016.

=== Other exhibitions ===
- Changing Faces: Work, Museum Folkwang, Essen, 2006.
- Up-and-Comers, GEM Museum of Contemporary Art, The Hague, 2006.
- Encounters, Mills Gallery, Boston Center for the Arts, Boston, 2007.
- Photography Meets Industry, GD4PhotoART, Bologna, 2008.
- Lumix Festival for Young Photojournalism, Hannover, 2008. Hornstra exhibited part of 101 Billionaires.
- Silverstein Photography Annual, Bruce Silverstein Gallery, New York, NY, 2008.
- Work, Reg Vardy Gallery, Sunderland, Tyne and Wear, 2009.
- 101 Billionaires, within FotoFestival Naarden, Naarden, 2009.
- Noorderlicht Photofestival, Groningen, 2009. Hornstra exhibited The Brown Room.
- Flatland at Madridfoto (PHotoEspaña), Feria de Madrid, Madrid, 2009.
- Prix de Rome, Witte de With, Rotterdam, 2009.
- La Collection de la MEP – Acquisitions et donations récentes, Maison européenne de la photographie, Paris, 2009.
- Quick Scan NL#01, Netherlands Photo Museum, Rotterdam, 2010.
- Art Amsterdam 2010 (Amsterdam), 2010.
- On the Other Side of the Mountains, in Mutations III: Public Images, Private Views, European Month of Photography. MACRo Testaccio (Fotografia Festival Roma, Rome); MUSA Museum auf Abruf, Monat der Fotografie Wien, Vienna; Bast'Art, Mesiac Fotografie 2010, Bratislava; Berlinische Galerie, Berlin; Carré Rotondes, Luxembourg. Also at Folkets Hus, Nordic Light International Festival of Photography, Kristiansund, 2011.
- In Your Face, Centraal Museum, Utrecht, 2010.
- Empty Land, Promised Land, Forbidden Land, Centraal Museum and Catharijneconvent, Dutch Doc Days, Utrecht, 2011. With WassinkLundgren (Thijs groot Wassink and Ruben Lundgren), Willem Popelier, Raoul Kramer and Florian Göttke, as nominees for the Dutch Doc award.
- Inside: How any story should ultimately be told. Flatland Gallery, 2011. Photographs by Hornstra from the Sochi Project, with those by Florian van Roekel from How Terry Likes His Coffee.
- Three Dutch photographers. Paris Photo, November 2012. With Florian van Roekel and Jaap Scheeren.
- Twente Biënnale. Rijksmuseum Twenthe, Enschede, May–June 2013.
- The Sochi Project. Cortona on the Move 2014 – Photography in travel festival, Cortona, Italy, July–September 2014. With van Bruggen.
- On the Move, Stedelijk Museum Amsterdam, August 2014 – February 2015. Includes The Sochi Project.

=== Exhibitions as curator ===
- New Dutch storytellers. Fotografia Festival Roma, MACRo Testaccio (Rome), September–October 2011. Works by Anne Geen, Anna Dasovic, Willem Popelier and Hornstra.

== Permanent collections ==
- Maison Européenne de la Photographie (Paris).
- Musée de la photographie à Charleroi (Charleroi).

== Publications by Hornstra ==
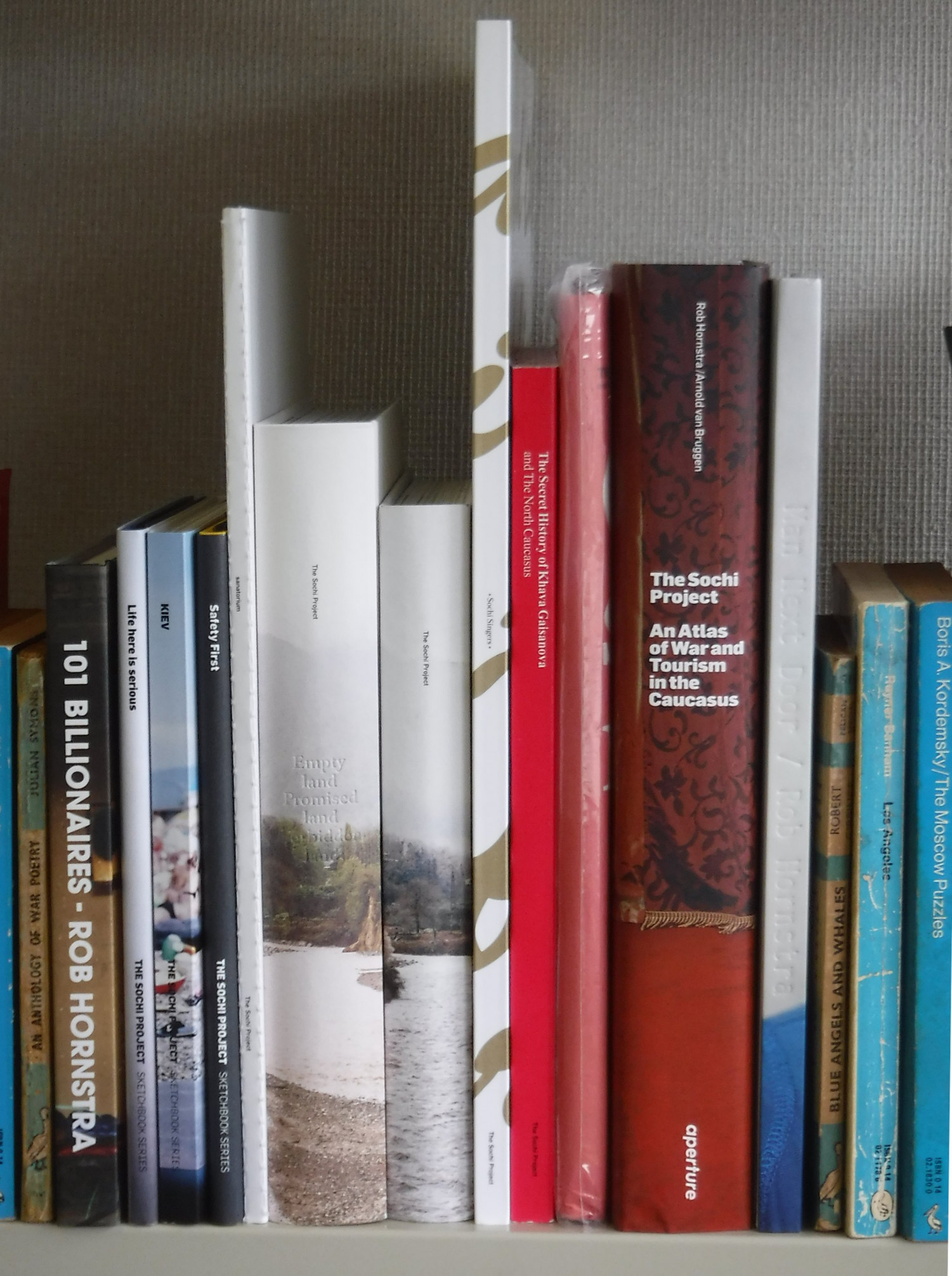
Photobooks, mostly self-published, by Hornstra, with and without van Bruggen. Left to right: 101 Billionaires (2nd ed); Life Here Is Serious; Kiev; Safety First; Sanatorium; Empty Land, Promised Land, Forbidden Land (1st ed); ditto (2nd ed); Sochi Singers; The Secret History of Khava Gaisanova; On the Other Side of the Mountains; An Atlas of War and Tourism in the Caucasus (1st ed); Man next Door. (Flanked by irrelevant Pelicans.)

Communism and Cowgirls. Self-published, 2004. On the new, post-Soviet generation of Russians. (Note: Images from this are available here at Borotov Archive. Accessed 5 January 2011.)

Rijk: Hoe een ideaal in een kwart eeuw werkelijkheid werd: Stichting de Arm. Utrecht: Autres Directions, 2005. ISBN 90-809681-1-0. By Bram Nijssen; photography by Hornstra. (in Dutch) About Stichting de Arm. (Note: For a description, see "Rijk, a company photobook by Rob Hornstra and Bram Nijssen Graphic Design Photography", Bint Photobooks, 26 February 2009. (in Dutch) Accessed 4 January 2011.)

Changing Faces: Work 1. Photography by Stein and Issa, Orri, Thomas Neumann, Renja Leino, Arturas Valiauga, and Hornstra. Edited by Agnes Matthias. Essen: Museum Volkwang, 2006; Steidl, 2006. ISBN 3-86521-211-5.

Roots of the Rúntur. Rit Thjódhminjasafns Íslands, 10. Reykjavík: Thjódhminjasafn Íslands, 2006. Photography by Hornstra, text by Hornstra and Ingvar Högni Ragnarsson. (in English and Dutch) About what were previously fishing communities in Iceland. (Note: For sample photographs, see "Project: Roots of the Rúntur, Rob Hornstra", Behind the Scene. Here at the Wayback Machine (archived on 26 August 2011). More images are available here at Borotov Archive. Accessed 4 January 2011.) (Rúntur, literally "round tour", and elsewhere a pub crawl or a drive around a circular course or even repeatedly around a single block, here means a repeated drive around the perimeter road of a village.)

101 Billionaires. Utrecht: Borotov Photography, 2008. With text by Hans Loos and van Bruggen. (in English) The title derives from the assertion in the Russian magazine Finans that Russia then had 101 (US dollar) billionaires. However, the book depicts not these Russians but rather those who were "forgotten by capitalism". (Note: The phrase is from "Forgotten by capitalism", Design Mind, n.d. (the first of a series of slides that illustrate the book). For an extended sample see Rob Hornstra, "101 Billionaires", Guernica, March 2010. For images see here at Borotov Archive. For an article on the book, partly based on an interview with Hornstra, see Liza de Rijk, "'Ik heb het idee dat iedereen bang is.' Rusland door de camera van Rob Hornstra", Metropolis M, 3 December 2008. (in Dutch) See Jeff Ladd's review of 101 Billionaires, 5B4 Photography and Books, 4 December 2008. All accessed 4–5 January 2011.) The book was nominated for the New York Photo Awards 2009 and listed among Photo-Eye's best ten photobooks for 2008.

101 Billionaires, 2nd edition. Utrecht: Borotov Photography, 2009. (in English) A cheaper edition (no gatefolds) with slightly updated text, whose publication was prompted by the news that the number of billionaires had plummeted to 49. Referred to by Hornstra and in reviews and notices as the 2009 Crisis Edition.

Sanatorium. N.p.: The Sochi Project, 2009. Photography by Hornstra, text by van Bruggen. The first of a series of annual publications from the Sochi Project, this booklet is about Sanatorium Metallurg at Sochi, which, like the other Soviet-era sanatoria in the area, appeared likely to be demolished and replaced with an expensive hotel in time for the 2014 Winter Olympics. (Note: For a sample, see "Russia's last resort", London Sunday Times Magazine Spectrum, 8 August 2010, pp. 36–37, reproduced here (PDF) at Borotov.com. For more, see here at Borotov Archive. For description/reviews, see Andrew Phelps, "Rob Hornstra: Sanatorium", Buffet, 27 December 2009; and Jörg Colberg, "Review: Sanatorium by Rob Hornstra and Arnold van Bruggen", Conscientious, 4 December 2009; Jeff Ladd, "Sanatorium by Rob Hornstra and Arnold van Bruggen", 5B4 Photography and Books, 31 December 2009. All accessed 4–5 January 2011.) Sanatorium won the "Photographic Book" category of the New York Photo Awards in 2010.

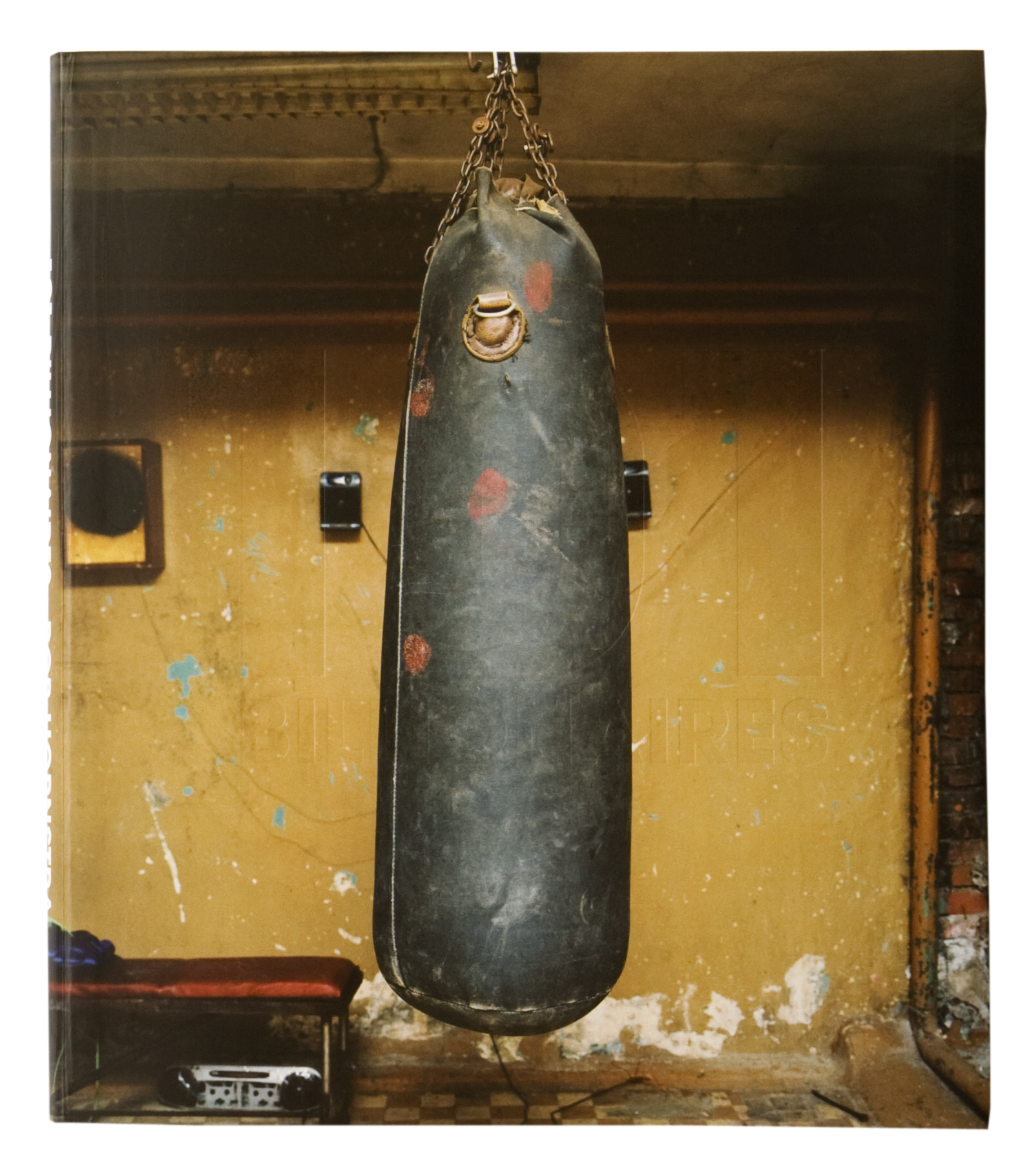
101 Billionaires

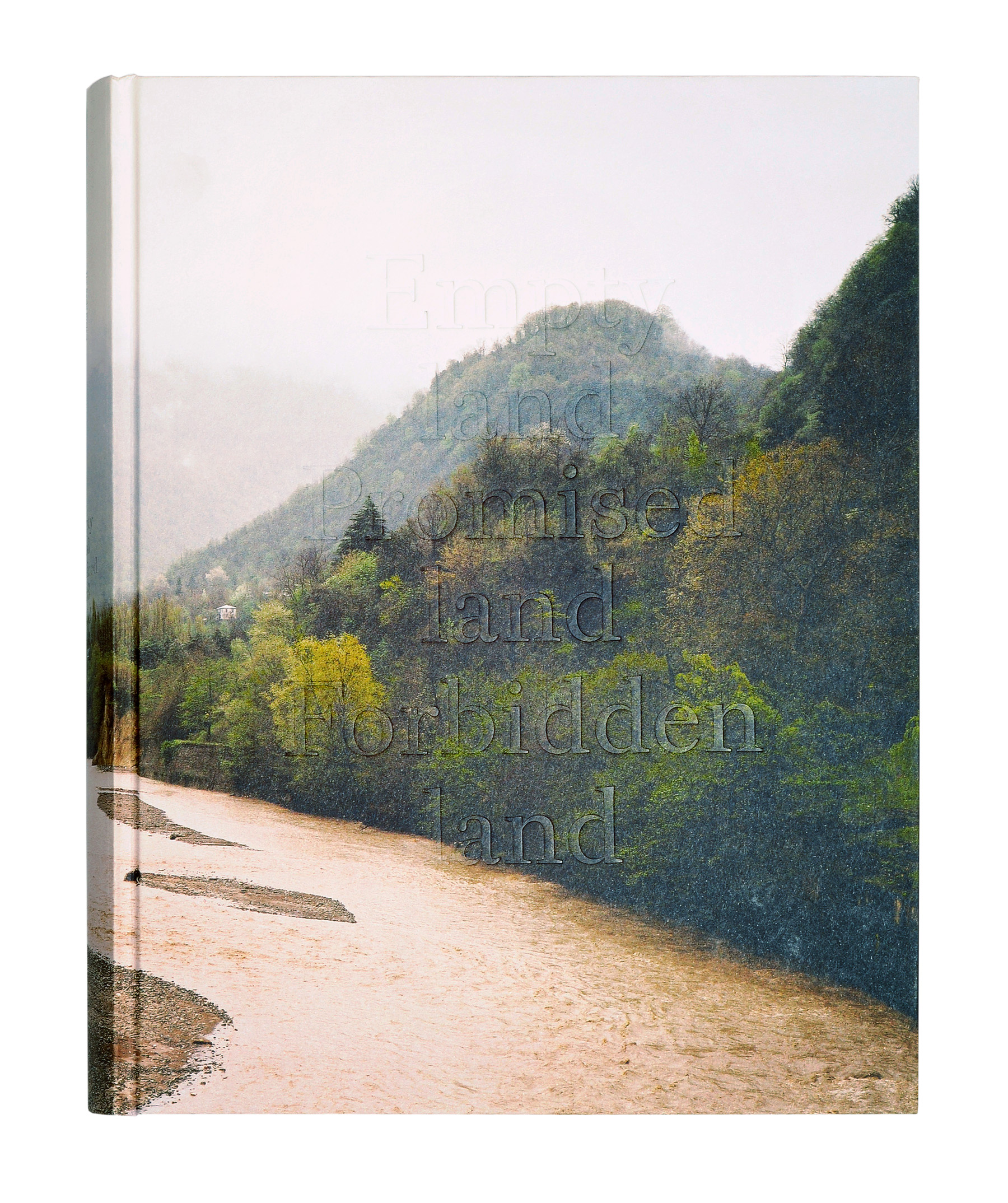
Empty Land, Promised Land, Forbidden land (1st ed)

Empty Land Promised Land Forbidden Land. N.p.: The Sochi Project, 2010. (in English) Photography by Hornstra, text by van Bruggen. This 271-page book is the second in the series of annual publications of the Sochi Project. A portrait of Abkhazia, and of Abkhazians and Georgians exiled from Abkhazia. (Note: Images of the book are available here at Borotov Archive. For reviews, see "Empty Land, Promised Land, Forbidden Land", Bastard Title, 27 November 2010, here at the Wayback Machine (archived 25 June 2011); Andrew Phelps, "Empty Land, Promised Land, Forbidden Land – Rob Hornstra and Arnold van Bruggen", Buffet, 28 November 2010; Jörg Colberg, "Review: Empty land, Promised land, Forbidden land by Rob Hornstra and Arnold van Bruggen", Conscientious, 3 December 2010. All accessed 4–5 January 2011.) The book was listed among Photo-Eye's best photobooks for 2010 and was nominated for the 2011 Dutch Doc award.

Empty Land Promised Land Forbidden Land. 2nd edition. N.p.: The Sochi Project, 2012. Smaller format than the original, and updated.

On the Other Side of the Mountains. N.p.: The Sochi Project, 2010. (in English) Photography by Hornstra, text by van Bruggen. A photograph album on newsprint (tabloid format) about the village of Krasny Vostok, in Karachay–Cherkessia. On p. 63 appear instructions on how to arrange pp. 3–62 of two copies into an exhibition, as was done during the 2010 European Month of Photography. Hornstra and Van Bruggen chose Krasny Vostok, on the other side of the mountains from Sochi, because nothing unusual happens there. (Note: For images, see here at Borotov Archive. For an account of the editing process see Rob Hornstra, "Do it yourself: The making of On the Other Side...", Ahorn Magazine. Accessed 4–5 January 2011.)

One Day: Ten Photographers. Heidelberg: Kehrer, 2011. ISBN 978-3-86828-173-6. A boxed set, edited by Harvey Benge, of ten books of photographs taken on 20 June 2010, each book by one of Jessica Backhaus, Gerry Badger, Benge, John Gossage, Todd Hido, Hornstra, Rinko Kawauchi, Eva Maria Ocherbauer, Martin Parr and Alec Soth.

Safety First. Sketchbook Series. N.p.: The Sochi Project, [2011]. (in English) Photography by Hornstra, text by van Bruggen. Photographs of Grozny, damaged by an X-ray scanner in Grozny.

Sochi Singers. N.p.: The Sochi Project, 2011. (in English) Photography by Hornstra, text by van Bruggen. Singers performing chansons/popsa in the restaurants of Sochi and nearby resorts.

Life Here is Serious. Sketchbook Series. N.p.: The Sochi Project, [2012]. (in English) Photography by Hornstra, text by van Bruggen. Photographs of young wrestlers in Dagestan. (Note: Short video of the book here.)

Kiev. Sketchbook Series. N.p.: The Sochi Project, [2012]. (in English) Photography and short text by Hornstra. Photographs of Sochi and its area, taken with a Kiev 6S camera. (Note: This particular model of Kiev, in Cyrillic script "Киев-6C", is shown and described here.)

The Secret History of Khava Gaisanova: And the North Caucasus. N.p.: The Sochi Project, 2013. (in English) Photography by Hornstra, text by van Bruggen. The story of one resident of Chermen, North Ossetia.

De Geheime Geschiedenis van Khava Gaisanova. N.p.: The Sochi Project, 2013. (in Dutch) Dutch-language edition of the above.

An Atlas of War and Tourism in the Caucasus. New York: Aperture, 2013. ISBN 978-1-59711-244-4.

An Atlas of War and Tourism in the Caucasus. 2nd edition. New York: Aperture, 2015. ISBN 978-1-59711-334-2. Smaller format than the original.

Man Next Door. Utrecht: self-published, 2017. Edition of 800 copies. Photographic portrait of a neighbour friend, with some captions.

The Europeans (the Former Capital). Utrecht: self-published; Kaunas, Lithuania: Kaunas Photography Gallery, 2020. Photography by Hornstra, text by van Bruggen. Bilingual (French and Lithuanian). Soft cover; edition of 1000 copies. Hard cover; edition of 120 copies.

The Europeans: the Naval Base. Utrecht: self-published, 2021. Photography by Hornstra, text by van Bruggen. Soft cover; edition of 1000 copies. Hard cover; edition of 120 copies.

The Europeans: Our Ancestral Home. Utrecht: self-published, 2022. Photography by Hornstra, text by van Bruggen. Bilingual (French and English). Soft cover; edition of 1000 copies. Hard cover; edition of 120 copies.

Money Always Wins / L'Argent Gagne Toujours. Utrecht: self-published, 2022. Photography by Hornstra, text by van Bruggen. 16-page newspaper.

== Awards ==
- 2011: 2010 Canon prize awarded to Hornstra for On the Other Side of the Mountain, Zilveren Camera.
- 2011: Safety First, from The Sochi Project, winner, Magnum Expression Award from Magnum Photos.
- 2012: Sochi Singers from The Sochi Project, winner, Professional Category: Arts and Culture, Sony World Photography Awards, World Photography Organisation.
- 2012: The Sochi Project: Sochi Singers, 1st prize, Stories, Arts and Entertainment, World Press Photo Awards 2012.
- 2013: Canon prize awarded to Hornstra and van Bruggen for The Sochi Project: An Atlas of War and Tourism in the Caucasus, Zilveren Camera.
- 2014: Dutch Doc Photo Award 2014 awarded to Hornstra and van Bruggen for The Sochi Project.
