= Bellver =

Bellver is a surname. Notable people with the surname include:

- Enrique Moreno Bellver (1963–2012), Spanish footballer
- Mariano Bellver (c. 1927 – 2018), Spanish art collector
- Ricardo Bellver (1845–1924), Spanish sculptor
- Sergi Bellver (born 1971), Spanish short story writer

== See also ==
- Bellver Castle
- Belver (disambiguation)
