= Apperley (surname) =

Apperley is a surname. Notable people with the surname include:

- Charles James Apperley (1777–1843), English sportsman and sporting writer
- David Apperley, Australian technical diver and cave explorer
- George Owen Wynne Apperley (1884–1960), English painter
