= Eternal Idol =

Eternal Idol or The Eternal Idol may refer to:

- The Eternal Idol, a 1987 album by Black Sabbath
- The Eternal Idol, a sculpture by Auguste Rodin
- Eternal Idol, a 1966 ballet by Edgar Hovhannisyan
- Elizabeth Peyton & Camille Claudel: Eternal Idol, a 2017 art exhibition
- Eternal Idol, a 1931 painting by George Owen Wynne Apperley
- Eternal Idol, nickname of Japanese singer-songwriter Seiko Matsuda
