= Reminiscencia =

Sculpture in Guadalajara, Jalisco, Mexico

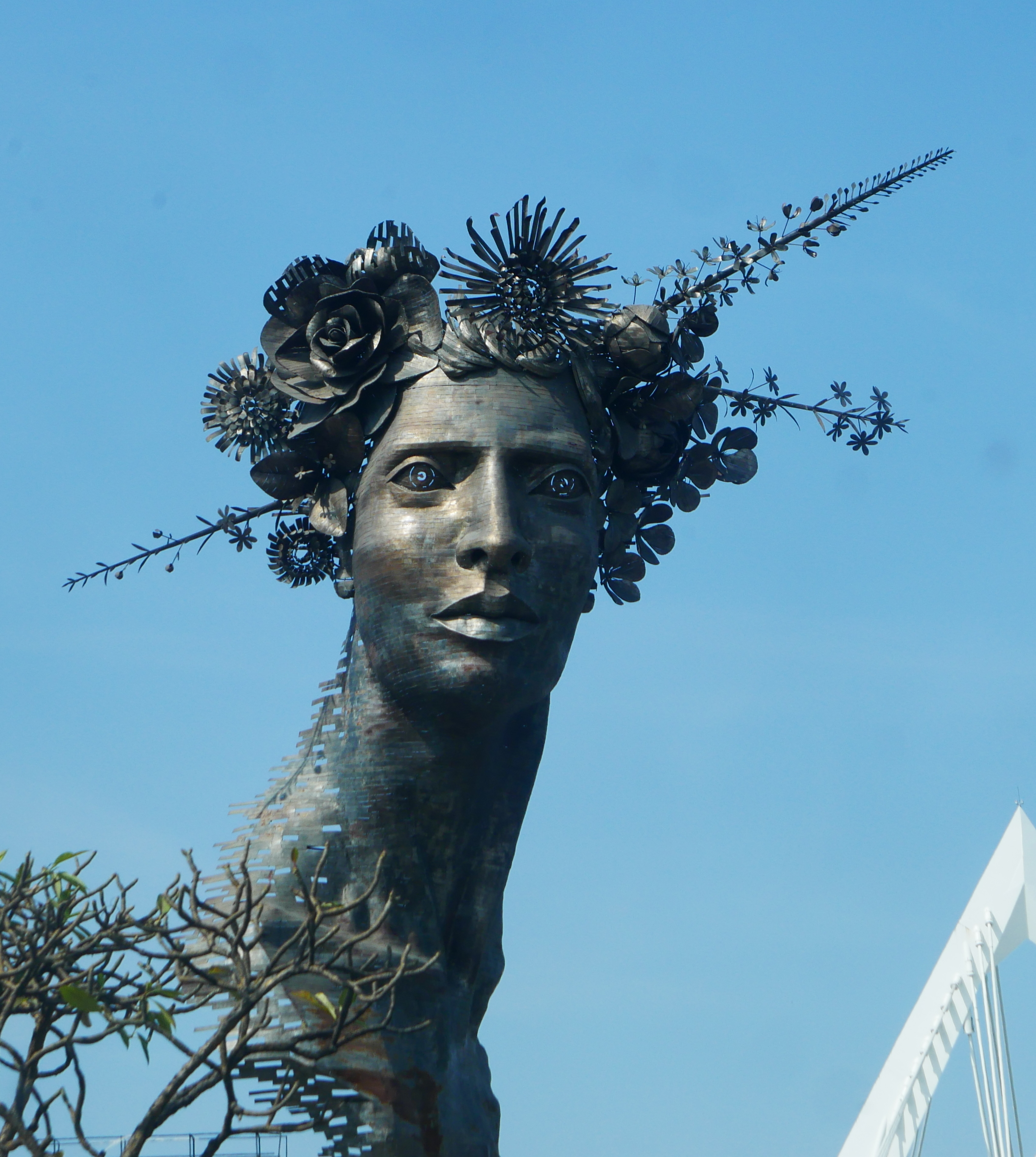
- The sculpture in 2024
- Artist: Rafael San Juan
- Year: 2018
- Medium: Steel
- Weight: 4 t
- Location: Guadalajara, Jalisco, Mexico
- 20°39′49.9″N 103°23′31″W

Reminiscencia (transl. Reminiscence) is a steel sculpture by Rafael San Juan, installed near Matute Remus Bridge, in Guadalajara, in the Mexican state of Jalisco. The 9-metre (30 ft) tall bust depicts a woman wearing a crown of flowers. It weighs 4 metric tons (3.9 long tons; 4.4 short tons) and it cost Mex$2.08 million. It was planned in 2015 and it was inaugurated on 26 September 2018 by then-municipal president, Enrique Ibarra Pedroza. It was named reminiscence after its slogan "knowledge is to remember". The sculpture honors Jalisco women.

== See also ==
- 2018 in art
