= Belver =

Belver may refer to places in Portugal and Spain:

- Belver (Carrazeda de Ansiães), a civil parish in the municipality of Carrazeda de Ansiães
- Belver (Gavião), a civil parish in the municipality of Gavião.

== See also ==
- Bellver, a surname
