= Continuing the Conversation =

Sculpture by Martin Dawe

- Artist: Martin Dawe
- Completion date: April 5, 2018
- Medium: Bronze, granite
- Subject: Rosa Parks
- Location: Georgia Tech, Atlanta, Georgia, United States

Continuing the Conversation is a public sculpture honoring Rosa Parks in Atlanta, Georgia, United States. Located on the main campus of the Georgia Institute of Technology (Georgia Tech), the artwork was created by Martin Dawe and unveiled in 2018.

== History ==
The idea for a monument honoring Rosa Parks at Georgia Tech was first put forward by Atlanta sculptor Martin Dawe. Dawe proposed the idea after noting that Parks died 50 years after her actions sparked the Montgomery bus boycott, with the artwork to be unveiled the day after the 50th anniversary of the assassination of Martin Luther King Jr. Coincidentally, Dawe had recently completed a public art piece of King, a statue of him at the Georgia State Capitol. Dawe proposed an artwork featuring two sculptures of Parks, with one of her at age 42 (when her actions started the boycott) and the other of her at age 92 (the age at which she died), with an empty seat between the two. The cost of the project was $300,000 and was covered by donations from two Georgia Tech alumni. The sculptures of Parks were bronzed in Utah, and the granite used the artwork came from Elberton, Georgia. The statue was unveiled on April 5, 2018, in a small area of the campus known as Harrison Square, named after former Tech President Edwin Harrison, who had desegregated Tech during his tenure. Attendees at the unveiling included relatives of Harrison, King, and Parks.

== See also ==
- 2018 in art
- Civil rights movement in popular culture
