= Karl-Heinz Adler =

German abstract painter, graphic artist and conceptual artist

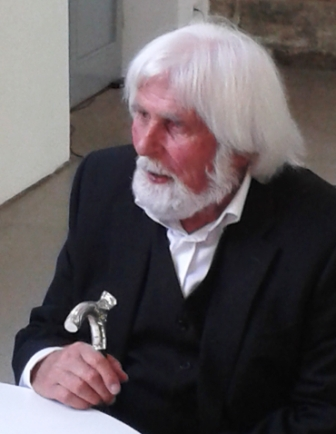
- Born: 20 June 1927; Adorf, Germany
- Died: 4 November 2018 (aged 91)
- Occupation: Painter

Karl-Heinz Adler (20 June 1927 – 4 November 2018) was a German abstract painter, graphic artist and conceptual artist and has been described as "one of Germany’s foremost representatives of Concrete Art." He produced many public monuments and developed, with Friedrich Kracht, modular concrete decoration for hundreds of buildings across East, now eastern, Germany.

As a full member of the Deutscher Künstlerbund (DKB), Adler participated in the DKB annual exhibitions in 1992 and 1993. Adler died in Dresden on November 4, 2018, at the age of 91. His grave is located in Loschwitz Cemetery.

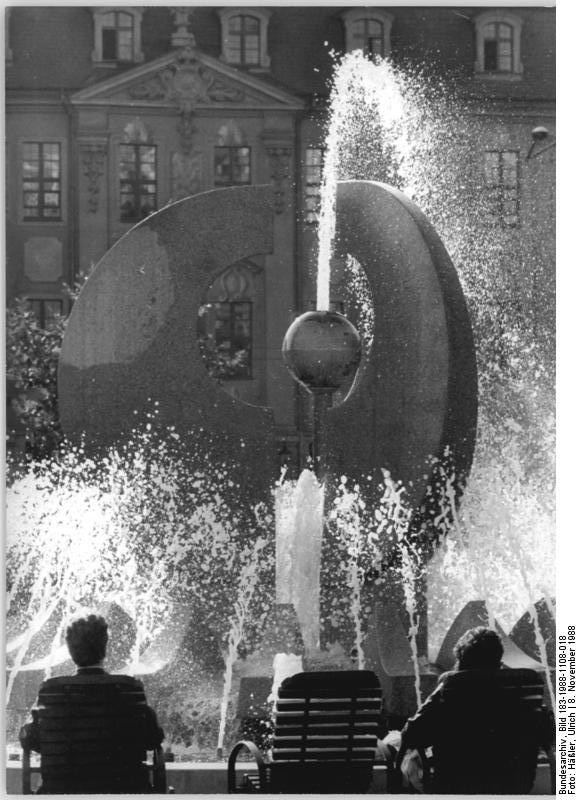
Adler and Friedrich Kracht's sculpture in Dresden's Neustädter Markt (Dresden)

== Other sources ==
Lybke, Gerd Harry, ed. (2017) Karl-Heinz Adler: Kunst im System – System in der Kunst, Spector Books
