= Giancarlo Vitali (painter) =

Italian painter and engraver (1929–2018)

Giancarlo Vitali (29 November 1929 – 25 July 2018) was an Italian painter and engraver.

== Biography ==
Vitali was born in Bellano, on Lake Como, into a family of fishermen. He began painting when he was fifteen, after having worked at the Institute of Graphic Arts of Bergamo. In 1947 he exhibited his first work at the Angelicum Gallery in Milan, on the occasion of the biennial exhibition of sacred art. In the following edition in 1949, the two works he exhibited, Visitazione and Cena in Emmaus, were met with great appreciation by Carlo Carrà. Vitali was awarded a fellowship from the Brera Academy in Milan but because he wasn't able to support himself he was force to reject it.

In 1981 his son Velasco Vitali, also a painter, encouraged Giancarlo to start working as an engraver.

In 1983 critic and writer Giovanni Testori, expressed the wish to meet Vitali after seeing one of his paintings depicting a quartered rabbit. The meeting generated a profound and solid relationship, founded on mutual esteem and admiration, which later became a long deep-rooted friendship. In 1984 Testori wrote an article about Vitai's work in the third page of Corriere della Sera and went on to organize his first solo exhibition at La Compagnia del Disegno in Milan. Vitali would later have several exhibitions in public and private institutions and released a series of catalogues and engravings portfolios.

At the end of the 1980s he realized many public art works, including The Portrays of Benefactors at Ospedale Maggiore in Milan commissioned by the Foundation Ca' Granda.

== Exhibitions ==
- 2008 - "Giancarlo Vitali and Mario Botta", curated by Carlo Bertelli, A.N.C.E. building, Lecco.
- 2007 - "Giancarlo Vitali: Works", IIC, Madrid
- 2005 - "Cartella Clinica: Chronicle of an Unsought Sojourn", Aula Magna of the Ospedale di Lecco.
- 2003 - "L'Oltranza della pittura: In memory of Giovanni Testori", Spazio Cinquesensi, Milan.
- 2002 - "La musica dipinta: Drawings and Oils", Spazio Cinquesensi, Milan.
- 2001 - "D'après", Arsmedia, Bergamo; in 2002 the exhibition was presented, with further drawings and oils, at Compagnia del Disegno, Milan.
- 2000 - "Il Paese del Pittore", Spazi industriali dell'ex Cotonificio Cantoni, Bellano.
- 2000 - "Lunario Minimo", organized by the Comune di Cento in collaboration with Promoart, Chiesa sconsacrata di San Lorenzo, Ferrara.
- 1999 - "Giancarlo Vitali", curated by Giancarlo Consonni, Palazzo Sormani Milan.
- 1999 - "Le stagioni della Vita", curated by Domenico Montalto, The Cantico gallery in the Monastery of San Damiano, Assisi.
- 1997 - "La Memoria Sottile", Scuderie of Villa Manzoni, Lecco.
- 1996 - "Giancarlo Vitali: Retrospective", curated by Marco Goldin, Palazzo Sarcinelli, Conegliano.
- 1994 – "Giancarlo Vitali", organized by Civica Raccolta Bertarelli at Sala Castellana, Castello Sforzesco, Milan.
- 1991 - "Le forme del tempo: A tribute to Antonio Stoppani", . Musei Civici, Villa Manzoni and Galleria Bellinzona, Lecco.
- 1987 - "La famiglia dei ritratti", curated by Giovanni Testori, Musei Civici, Lecco.
- 1985 - "Giancarlo Vitali", curated by Giovanni Testori, La Compagnia del Disegno, Milan.

== Publications ==
- "Giancarlo Vitali: Paintings, engravings and drawings". Text by Leonardo Castellucci. Florence, 2007.
- "Cartella Clinica". Preface by Marco Vallora. Texts by Giancarlo Vitali and Andrea Vitali (writer and award winner in 2007 of the Bancarella prize), Cattaneo publishing, 2005.
- "Dono di luoghi. Poems by Giancarlo Consonni". Lecco Province Builders Association and Itaca publishing, 2004.
- "L'Oltranza della pittura", by Giancarlo Testori. Itaca publishing, 2003.
- "D'Après". Preface by Giuliano Collina, Itaca publishing, 2001.
- "Il paese del pittore". Preface by Marco Fragonara, a poem by Tonino Guerra along with a text by Andrea Vitali. DeAgostini Rizzoli, 2000.
- "Lunario Minimo". Preface by Ludovico Pratesi, DeAgostini Rizzoli, 2000.
- "Le stagioni della vita". Text by Domenico Montalto. Itaca publishing, 1999.
- "La Memoria Sottile". Texts by Tiziana Rota and Marco Carminati, and poems by Valerio Magrelli. Itaca publishing, 1997.
- "Giancarlo Vitali". Texts by Marco Goldin and Marco Vallora. Electa Mondadori, 1996.
- "Catalogo generale dell'opera incisa". Edited by Paolo Bellini. Bellinzona publishing – Linati – Stefanoni, 1994.
- "Le forme del tempo". Introduction by Alberto Longatti. Bellinzona publishing, 1991.
- "La famiglia dei ritratti". Text by Giovanni Testori. Electa, 1987.
- "Giancarlo Vitali". Edited by Giovanni Testori, La Compagnia del Disegno, 1985.

== Editions ==
=== Engravings portfolios ===
- "Suovetaurilia", counting 6 engravings. Text by Carlo Bertelli, Itaca publishing – Milan 2008.
- "Abitare", 6 engravings. Text by Mario Botta, Lecco Province Builders Association, 2006.
- "Omaggio al cantiere", 5 engravings. Text By Mario Sangiorgio, Lecco Province Builders Association, 2004.
- "Concerto", 8 engravings with 8 poems by Giancarlo Consonni, preface by Marco Vallora, 2002.
- "Bestiario", 8 poems by Giancarlo Consonni and 8 engravings by Giancarlo Vitali, introduction by Gina Lagorio, Itaca publishing – Milan, 1999.
- "Le forme del tempo", preface by Alberto Longatti. Bellinzona publishing, 1991.
- "Tommaso Grossi", 2 engravings along with 2 poems. Preface by Gianfranco Scotti. Lions Club, 1991.
- "Il mio museo quotidiano", presented by Testori and printed by Bandini. Bellinzona publishing, 1985.
- "Poesie per il Trittico del toro", 3 poems by Giovanni Testori accompanied with an engraving by Giancarlo Vitali. La Compagnia del Disegno publishing, 1985.
- "Il mio paese del lago", presented by Gianni Brera and printed by Giorgio Upiglio. Bellinzona publishing, 1982.

=== Artist's books ===
- "Maschere", by Henri de Régnier with 2 original etchings.
- "Attorno al tavolo", 11 engravings and 9 poems by Franco Loi. Tavolo Rosso – Stamperia Albicocco, Udine, 2003.
- "Guardare i Tramonti", a poem by Tonino Guerra along with 9 engravings. Gibralfaro publishing, Verona 2000.
