= Okuda San Miguel =

Spanish painter and sculptor

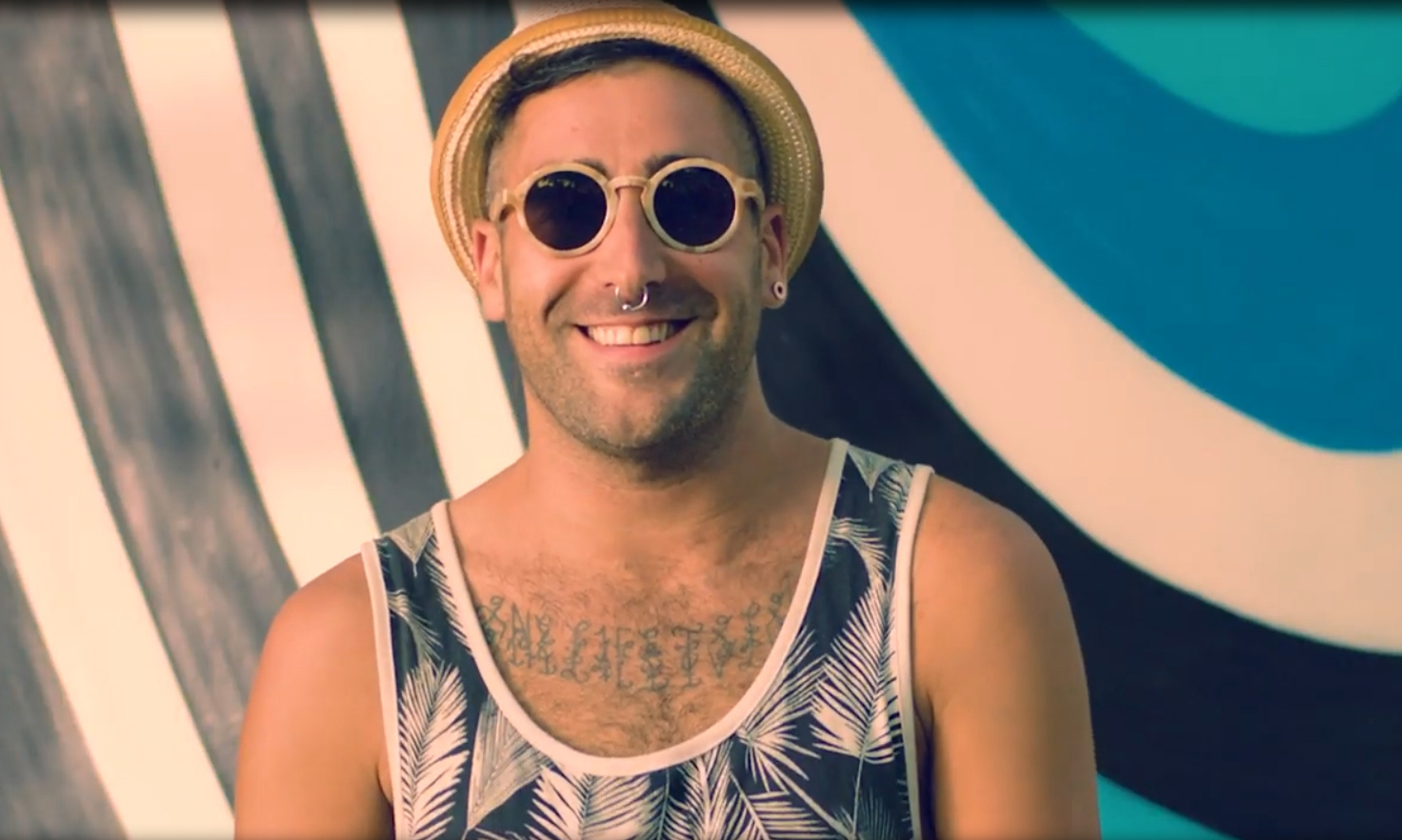
- San Miguel in 2017
- Born: Oscar San Miguel Erice; 19 November 1980; Santander, Spain
- Known for: Street Art, Sculpture, Painting
- Notable work: Kaos Temple

Okuda San Miguel (born Óscar San Miguel Erice; Santander, 19 November 1980) is a Spanish painter and sculptor known for his distinctive style of colorful geometric patterns that portray animals, skulls, religious iconography and human figures. He painted the Kaos Temple in Llanera, Asturias, Spain. His murals can be seen on buildings and objects across the world in India, Italy, Mali, France, the United States, Japan, Chile, Brazil, Peru, South Africa, Mexico, Canada, Morocco, Ukraine and Spain.

== Biography ==
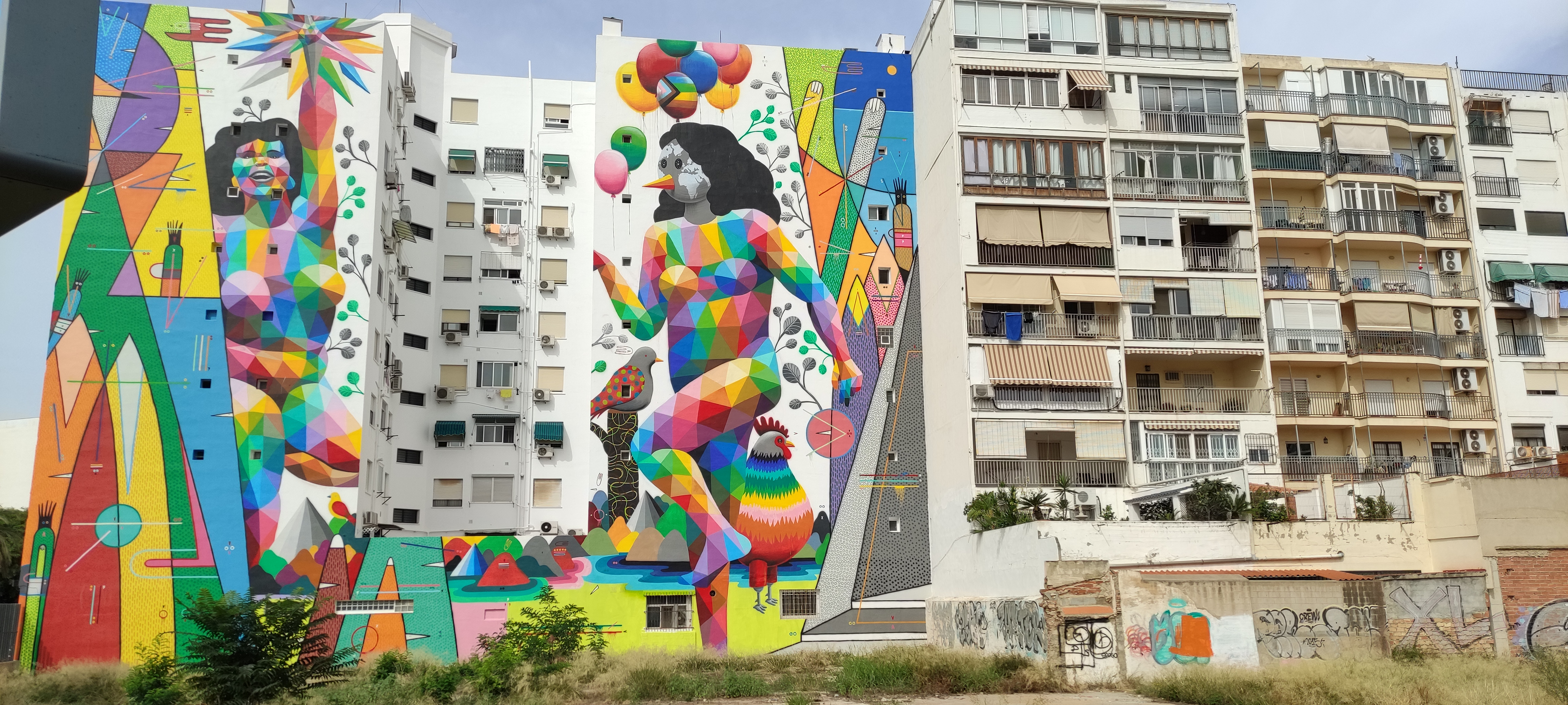
Intervention of Okuda in València.

Born Oscar San Miguel Erice in Santander, Spain, Okuda began producing recognizable graffiti along railroad tracks and on abandoned factories in his hometown around 1997. After receiving a Bachelor of Fine Arts from the Complutense University of Madrid in 2007, he began to produce works in his studio, which led to shows in New York, Berlin, London and Paris. Around 2009, he also began producing sculpture. In 2011, his sculpture began to exhibit the colorful, frequently triangular geometric patterns for which he became known. His early works focus on birds, stars, naked women, skulls and faces. Many of Okuda's human characters are painted in grayscale.

Okuda received international renown after painting the interior of the church of Santa Barbara in Llanera, Asturias, Spain, in 2015. After a group of donors purchased the church and turned it into a skate park, they agreed with Okuda to paint the interior. Following its debut, the church was renamed the Kaos Temple. In 2015, he also began producing 3D sculpture of animal heads in fiberglass bearing his signature colorful geometric patterns. The following year, Okuda painted another abandoned church with a 360-degree mural in Marrakesh, Morocco, which he titled "11 Mirages to Freedom."

In 2017, Okuda was named among the most recognized contemporary urban artists by Graffiti Art Magazine. His outdoor works appear in Spain, Morocco, Miami, Paris, Edmonton, Vancouver, and Toronto. His tallest outdoor mural is a multithemed painting on a 23-story student residence in Toronto, completed in 2018.

In 2018 he placed Air Land Sea, a series of seven sculptures in and around the Boston Seaport in Boston, Massachusetts in the United States. It is his largest installed series of work to date.

== Characteristics of his work ==
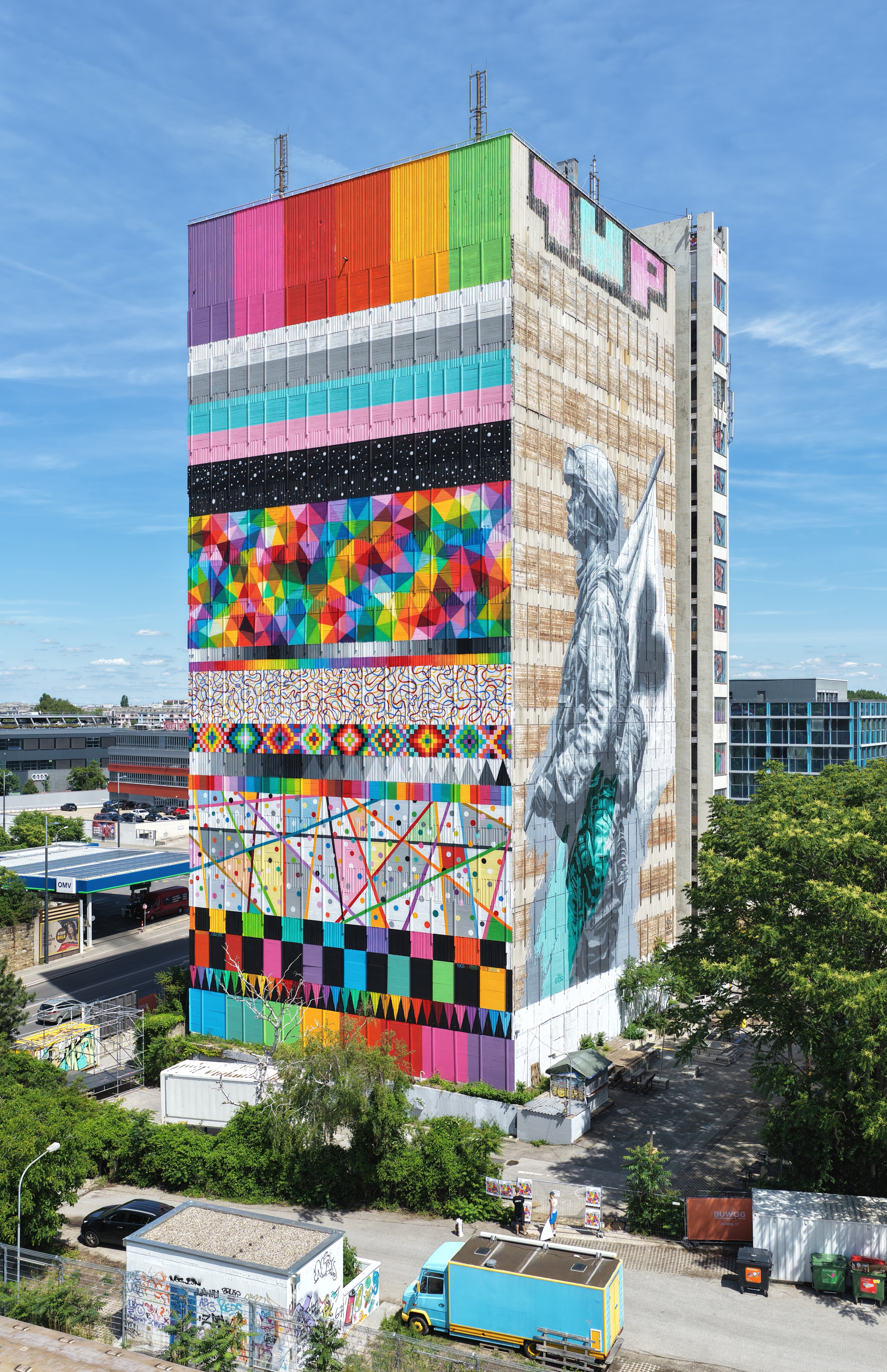
“In Equality” in Vienna, 2026

The work of Okuda San Miguel is predominantly characterized by geometric structures and multicolored prints. These are sometimes associated with gray bodies, and often include headless figures, religious references, symbols, animals and giant heads. Art critics catalog his style as pop surrealism with a clear street influence of urban art, though his style has not been exempt from controversy.

His works focus on contradictions in existentialism, the meaning of life and the false freedom of capitalism, particularly on the conflict between modernity and our human roots. He is interested in pop art, especially in cinema and fashion, as well as in the light and color of other cultures, which allows him to incorporate all these interests to his style. Sometimes he looks for inspiration in great classic works such as the Garden of the Delights of El Bosco or Mona Lisa by Leonardo da Vinci. As influences, he cites René Magritte, Max Ernst, Yayoi Kusama, Takashi Murakami, and Hieronymus Bosch.

== Selected exhibitions ==
=== Solo exhibitions ===
- "Horses and muses" Hashtag Gallery, Toronto. Canada 2018
- "No Religions in the Sky" Delimbo Art Space, Seville. Spain 2018.
- "The Multicolored Equilibrium Between Animals and Humans" Centre del Carme, Valencia. Spain 2018.
- "Palace of the Holy Animals" Palacete del Embarcadero, Santander. Spain 2017
- "The Dream of Mona Lisa", Paris Adda&Taxie Gallery, París. France 2017
- "AsiAfricalism" Kalembach Gallery, Amsterdam. Holland 2016
- "Vidas Inertes" Underdogs Gallery, Lisbon. Portugal 2014
- "Dream or Die" SC Gallery, Bilbao. Spain 2013
- "Nothing & Nobody & Nowhere" Espacio de arte La Sala, Zaragoza. Spain 2013
- "Nada ni Nadie" Sala Domingo, Lima. Perú 2013
- "Rainbow in the Darkness” Espacio G3, Madrid. Spain 2013
- "Welcome to 12/12/12" Fifty24MX, Mexico city. Mexico 2012
- “Welcome to Nowhere” El Bigote del Sr Smith, Barcelona. Spain 2012
- "Prohibido Vivir" SC Gallery, Bilbao. Spain 2011
- "Irrealismolandia" Iam gallery, Madrid. Spain 2010

=== Group exhibitions ===
- "212 Arts Anniversary exhibit", 212 ARTS. NYC, USA 2018
- "Wish you were here", Stolen Space. England 2018
- "Grand Opening", Mirus Gallery. Denver, USA 2018
- "Urban Art Fair". Paris. France 2018
- "Kunst Rai Amsterdam" Art Fair. Amsterdam. Netherlands 2018
- “Art Madrid" Art Fair. Madrid. Spain 2018
- "Theriomorphism V", Galeria Kreisler. Madrid. Spain 2018
- "Urvanity" Art Fair. Madrid. Spain 2018
- "Rise And Shine" Arcade Art Gallery, Kaohsiung, Taiwan 2017
- "Truck Art Project" ARCO Art Fair. Ifema. Madrid. Spain 2016
- "Just Mad" Art Fair, IAM Gallery, Madrid. España 2016
- "Friends & Family" Delimbo Art Space, Seville. Spain 2016
- "Theriomorphism III" IAM Gallery, Madrid. Spain 2016
- "LA Art Show" Littletopia. ThinkSpace Gallery, Los Angeles. USA 2016
- "IamXUp&Coming" Kreisler Gallery, Madrid. Spain 2015
- "Stock Out" Contemporanea. Finestra Gallery, Zaragoza. Spain 2015
- "Between Worlds" Corey Helford Gallery, Los Angeles. USA 2015
- "Superfine Art Fair" Miami Art Basel, Miami. USA 2015
- "Affordable Art Fair" Active Art Gallery. Hamburg. Germany 2015
- "Designers Open" Active Art Gallery, Leipzig. Germany 2015
- "PROJECT 64" Pabillion 64. Artmossphere, Moscow. Russia 2015
- "LAX/LTW" Thinkspace Invades Detroit. Inner State Gallery, Detroit. USA 2015
- "RED. Expresionism" 19Karen gallery. Gold Coast. Australia 2015
- "A Major Minority 2015" 1AM Gallery. San Francisco. USA 2015
- "Kaleidoscope" Mya Gallery, London. UK 2015
- "RED. Expresionism" 19Karen Gallery, Gold Coast. Australia 2015
- "POP POP POP" Second Above Gallery, Hong Kong. China 2014
