= Gregg Juarez =

American art dealer and philanthropist

Gregg Juarez (January 9, 1924 – May 26, 2018) was an American art dealer who has been the proprietor of a series of galleries in both Europe and the United States, as well as a noted philanthropist. A native Californian, he was a ninth-generation member of a family which predates California becoming part of the United States. His family were the participants in the first recorded marriage in Mission Santa Barbara in the 18th century. Over the years Juarez has owned galleries in Beverly Hills, Paris and Palm Beach, Florida. As a philanthropist he was a patron of both Pepperdine University and Scripps Health. Juarez resided in Carlsbad, California, in a large pink house overlooking Batiquitos Lagoon, which was filled with his personal collection of artwork, including pieces by artists such as by Auguste Rodin, Joan Miró, Marc Chagall.
