= Mark Peterson (photographer) =

American photographer

Mark Peterson (born 1955) is an American photographer based in New York City. His work has been published in the New York Times Magazine, New York Magazine, Fortune Magazine, Time magazine, ESPN The Magazine, and Geo Magazine. He is the author of the book Acts Of Charity (2004).

== Early life ==
Peterson was born in Minneapolis, Minnesota.

== Career ==
Peterson is a freelance photographer working for publications such as New York Times Magazine, New York, Fortune, ESPN magazine, InStyle, Elle, Geo, Time, Newsweek, and Gentleman's Quarterly, People, Food Network.

Much of his work consists of political figures and people of wealth and notoriety. He frequently uses rich color and detail. He has photographed major political moments in history, such as the fall of the Berlin Wall, the Clinton, Dole, and George W. Bush campaigns. Recently, he has worked with such publications as GQ and MSNBC to cover events via Instagram, including the 2012 Democratic Convention. He has photographed in the Arctic Circle and the world's smallest nation, Tuvalu.

== Publications ==
- Acts Of Charity. Brooklyn, NY: powerHouse, 2004. ISBN 978-1-57687-211-6. With an introduction by Philip Weiss.

== Awards and exhibitions ==
He has received several awards, including the W. Eugene Smith Support Grant for his work on "revolving door" alcoholics and the Alfred Eisenstaedt Awards for Magazine Photography. He has been in numerous exhibitions and museum shows including:

- To Have and Have Not, The World of the 1%, Nooderlicht Photo Festival, Netherlands
- SLIDELUCK NYC XVII. curated by Kira Pollack, Director of Photography for TIME magazine, Brooklyn, NY
- Museums Are Worlds, Louvre Museum, Paris, France
- American Youth, Minneapolis Photo Center, Minneapolis, MN
- The High Life, Visa Pour L'Image, Perpignan, France
- Alcoholic in USA, Visa Pour L'Image, Perpignan, France
- Political Theatre, UC Berkeley School of Journalism, Berkeley, CA
