= Jörg Colberg =

US-resident German writer, educator, photographer

Jörg M. Colberg (born 15 February 1968) is a German writer, educator and photographer, living in Northampton, Massachusetts, USA. He is the founder and editor of Conscientious, a blog dedicated to contemporary fine-art photography. He worked as a research scientist in astronomy and has been a professor of photography at the Hartford Art School.

== Life and work ==
Colberg studied physics and astronomy at the University of Bonn; he earned a Ph.D. in physics (theoretical cosmology) at the Max Planck Institute for Astrophysics. He moved to the United States in 2000. After a short and unsatisfying experience in the computer programming industry. Colberg returned as a postdoc at the University of Pittsburgh.

He discusses and dissects contemporary fine art photography on his blog, Conscientious, started in 2002. In 2009, Source included Conscientious in its list of ten recommended photography blogs; in 2010 Wired said that "Joerg Colberg is a pioneer in photography blogging, and his blog Conscientious maintains a tight editorial voice"; and in 2012 Sean O'Hagan included it among his few most recommended online photography websites and publications. In 2006, American Photo named Colberg one of their Photography Innovators.

Colberg is the author of Understanding Photobooks: The Form and Content of the Photographic Book (2016), a guide to making photobooks. He has contributed essays to photography publications, including Foam Magazine, British Journal of Photography, and Creative Review. Along with Andrés Marroquín Winkelmann, he was a founder of the short-lived photobook publishing company Meier & Müller. From 2010, he was a faculty member of the Hartford Art School.

In the photobook Vaterland (2020), Colberg reflects on the rise of anti-immigrant racism and xenophobia in Germany, "which he believes is not being taken seriously enough", with right-wing ideology having become normalised. It was described in the British Journal of Photography that Colberg achieves this through "an atmosphere of uneasiness. [. . .] There is little contrast between black and white. [. . .] Each picture frames a lingering uncertainty; something out of place. [. . .] The images work together to create a mood of angst." He made the images in Berlin, Hamburg and Warsaw.

== Personal life ==
As of 2021 he was living in Northampton, Massachusetts.

== Publications ==
=== Publications by Colberg ===
- Linking cluster formation to large scale structure. Max Planck Institute for Astrophysics, 1997. OCLC 60144166.
- Peculiar velocities of galaxy clusters. Munich: Max Planck Institute for Astrophysics, 1998. OCLC 75873003.
- At the Edge of the Known World (According to Google Street View). Self-published.
- Understanding Photobooks: the Form and Content of the Photographic Book. London: Focal, 2016. Hardback, ISBN 978-1138892712; paperback, ISBN 978-1138892699.
- Photography's Neoliberal Realism. Discourse 4. London: Mack, 2020. ISBN 978-1-913620-16-5.
- Vaterland. Bielefeld, Germany: Kerber, 2020. ISBN 978-3-7356-0709-6. Text in English, German and Polish.
- Fault Lines. Bielefeld, Germany: Kerber, 2024. ISBN 978-3-7356-1000-3 With text by Judith Gellér, Milos Kallai, Domonkos Németh, Ákos Polgárdi, Andi Schmied, and Liza Szabó. In English and German.

=== Publications with contributions by Colberg ===
- Image Makers, Image Takers: the essential guide to photography by those in the know. New York: Thames & Hudson, 2010. By Anne-Celine Jaeger. ISBN 9780500288924. Second expanded edition.
- Conditions by Andrés Marroquín Winkelmann, Meier & Müller, 2010. Edition of 300 copies. Edited by Adam Barto. Co-published and with an introductory essay by Colberg.
- Observed. London: Ivorypress, 2013. ISBN 978-8494053559. Sixth volume of C Photo. Guest edited by Colberg.
- 2013 project. Caf́é Royal, 2013. ISBN 978-0957586703. Includes texts by Colberg, Craig Atkinson, Sarah Bodman and Lawrence Zeegen.
- Ostkreuz 25 Jahre. Ostfildern, Germany: Hatje Cantz, 2015. Edited by "Ostkreuz" (photo agency). ISBN 978-3-7757-4062-3. With a foreword by Wolfgang Kil and essays by Colberg and Laura Benz. Text in German, English and French.
- Tim Richmond: Last Best Hiding Place. Heidelberg: Kehrer, 2015. Edited by Tim Richmond and Lee C. Wallick. ISBN 9783868286038. With an essay by Colberg.

== Awards ==
- 2011: Life.com picked Conscientious for its Photo Blog Awards.
