= Mariano Bellver =

Spanish art collector (c.1927–2018)

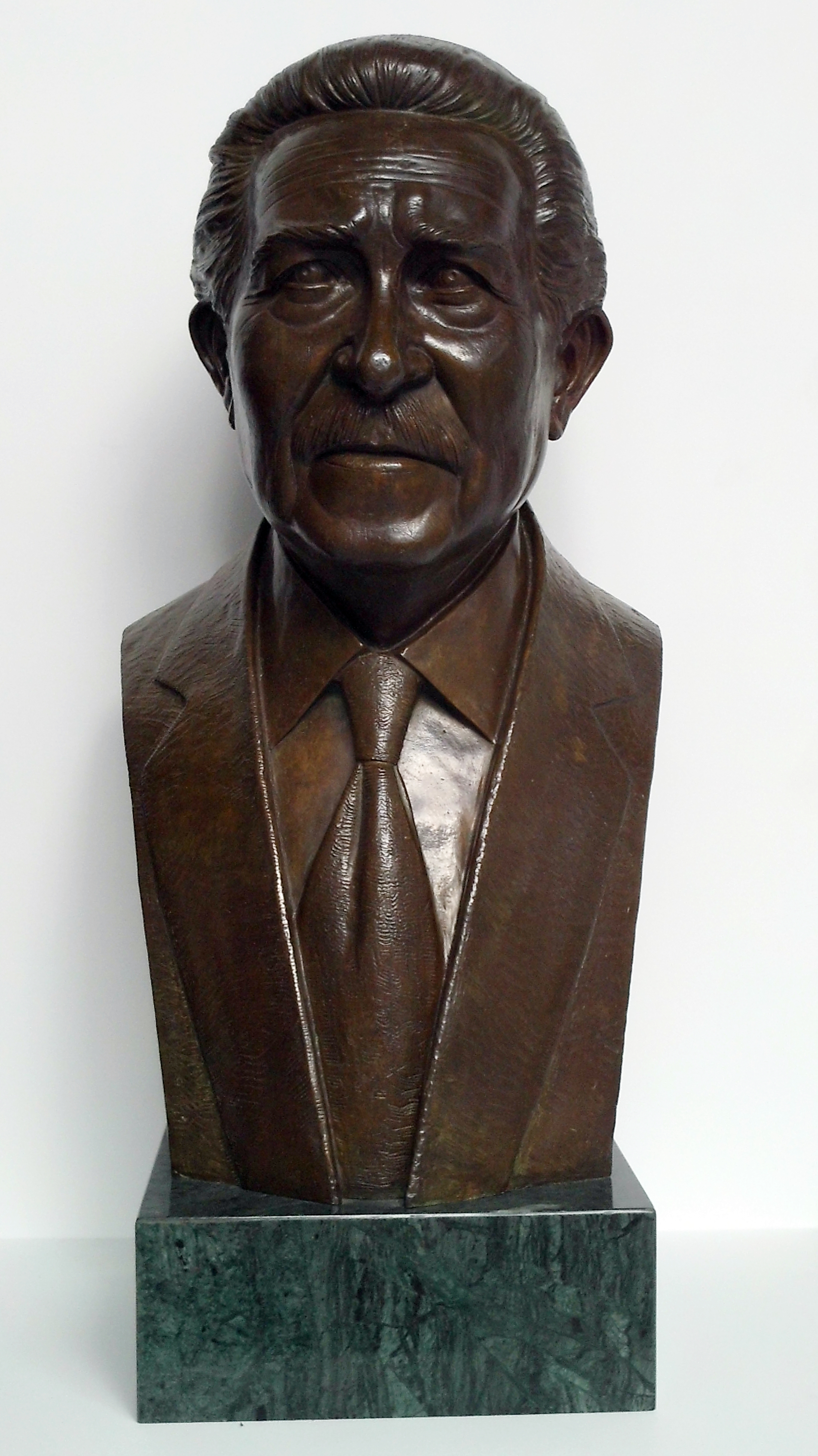
Mariano Bellver Utrera. Sebastián Santos Calero. 2009. Colección Bellver. Casa Fabiola. Sevilla, Andalucía, España.

Mariano Bellver (c. 1927 - November 23, 2018) was a Spanish art collector. His great-grandfather Francisco Bellver y Collazos and his grandfather Ricardo Bellver were sculptors, and Bellver inherited some of their works. In October 2018, he donated 550 works from his collection to the Fabiola House in Seville.

== Biography ==
When he was twelve years old, his family moved to Seville, where he studied merchant professor and insurance actuary, and lived all his life. It was until his death that he was the owner of the San Juan Bosco school in Seville, located on the well-known Venice Street, where he had walked daily for more than 50 years, without missing a “class” for a single day. Everyone who met Don Mariano knew that in addition to being a classy millionaire, he was a humble man who never left his two well-known passions, teaching and art. All kinds of students have passed through his school, some of them outstanding in the world of art and music such as the Lyric Tenor Elio Rafael Berenguer Hernández who grew up in the same street, and is also the grandson of the late master of the Spanish Haute Couture Elio Berenguer Úbeda, known worldwide as Elio Berhanyer 1929–2019).

Currently, the owner of the concerted school is his widow María Dolores Mejías Guerra, who was always by his side, and with whom he has lived happily surrounded by art his years of life in his family palace in the Plaza del Museo de Sevilla. Which today is as he said "alone", by donating much of his great collection to the city of Seville.

He was the grandson of the sculptor Ricardo Bellver (1845–1924), who was the author in 1885 of the relief of the Assumption that is located on the door of the same name of the Cathedral of Seville and the apostolate that flanks it.

In 1960 he married María Dolores Mejías Guerra and, from then on, he began to acquire works of art . Initially he was interested in the painting of the Golden Age, although he soon rediscovered the forgotten pictorial works of nineteenth-century romanticism and realism, focusing his interest on canvases belonging to the Sevillian school of the nineteenth and twentieth centuries.

He was the owner of a collection of works of art made up of more than three hundred paintings, most of them 19th century Andalusian customs, which include paintings by painters such as Manuel García y Rodríguez, Valeriano Bécquer, Ricardo López Cabrera, José García Ramos, Antonio Cabral Bejarano, José Pinelo Llull, José Gutiérrez de la Vega and Gonzalo Bilbao. To this we must add carvings, ivories, ceramics, watches, furniture, Neapolitan nativity scenes and other objects of decorative art. Among the latest works that have been integrated into the collection are paintings by Pharamond Blanchard, José Pinelo Llull, Lafita and George Owen Wynne Apperley, who correspond with his fondness for the works of both Spanish and foreign painters who have dealt with Andalusian themes. The set is known as Bellver Collection .

Culminating a fairly long process of deliberations and negotiations, the collection was donated to the City of Seville to be permanently exhibited. In November 2016, the City Council of Seville announced the purchase of the Fabiola House, located in the San Bartolomé neighborhood of the Casco Antiguo district, to exhibit the collection. The inauguration took place on October 11, 2018, and just one month later Mariano Bellver died.

Bellver donated works to other institutions in the city, including a ceramic altarpiece with the representation of the Virgen del Amparo who received the Brotherhood of Our Lady of Amparo in Seville, which is based in the church of Santa María Magdalena .
