= Nordic Light =

Photography festival

The 2009 logo of Nordic Light.

Nordic Light International Festival of Photography (or just Nordic Light) is an international photo festival held annually in the city of Kristiansund, Norway.

== Background ==
The festival was established in 2006, and has grown to become one of the most important photo festivals in Europe. The festival attracts famous photographers from all over the world, like Martin Parr, James Nachtwey and Bruce Gilden. The biggest festival as of 2011 was that of 2011, with over 50 exhibitions and guests like Gered Mankowitz and Lucien Clergue.
