= George Owen Wynne Apperley =

English painter (1884–1960)

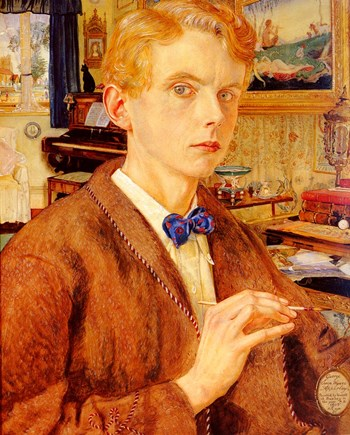
- Self-portrait (1915)
- Born: 17 June 1884; Ventnor, Isle of Wight, England
- Died: 10 September 1960 (aged 76); Tangier, Morocco
- Known for: Paintings
- Movement: Romanticism

George Owen Wynne Apperley (1884-1960) was a British painter. Described as “one of the finest” of the late Romantic artists, he worked mainly in Spain and in North Africa.

== Life ==
Apperley was born at Ventnor, on the Isle of Wight, in 1884. He trained at the Torquay School of Art and briefly at the Herkomer School in Bushey, Hertfordshire, but was mostly self-taught. He moved to Spain in 1917, abandoning his British wife, Hilda Pope, and family, and established himself in a carmen in the Albaicín district of Granada. He became friends with many of the artists resident in the city, (Note: One of Apperley’s acquaintances was Federico García Lorca, who named a pastry of which Apperley was particularly fond “Apperlies”.) but was forced to leave in 1932 when his conservative political stance regarding the Second Spanish Republic led to the bombing of his house. He moved with his second family, his muse and later wife, Enriqueta Contreras and their two sons, to Tangier, Morocco, where he died in 1960. He is commemorated in Granada by a statue, unveiled in 2011.

== Works ==
Apperley first worked on Classical and mythological subjects. His moves to Spain, and subsequently Morocco, saw his focus shift to portraiture. Examples of his work are held by the Victoria & Albert Museum, (Note: The V&A holds Apperley’s La Cordobesa, a watercolour dating from 1923.) the Museo de Málaga, the Lady Lever Art Gallery and the Bushey Museum.

== Gallery ==
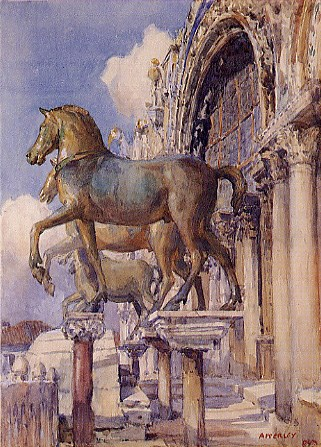
Horses of St Mark, Venice (1905)

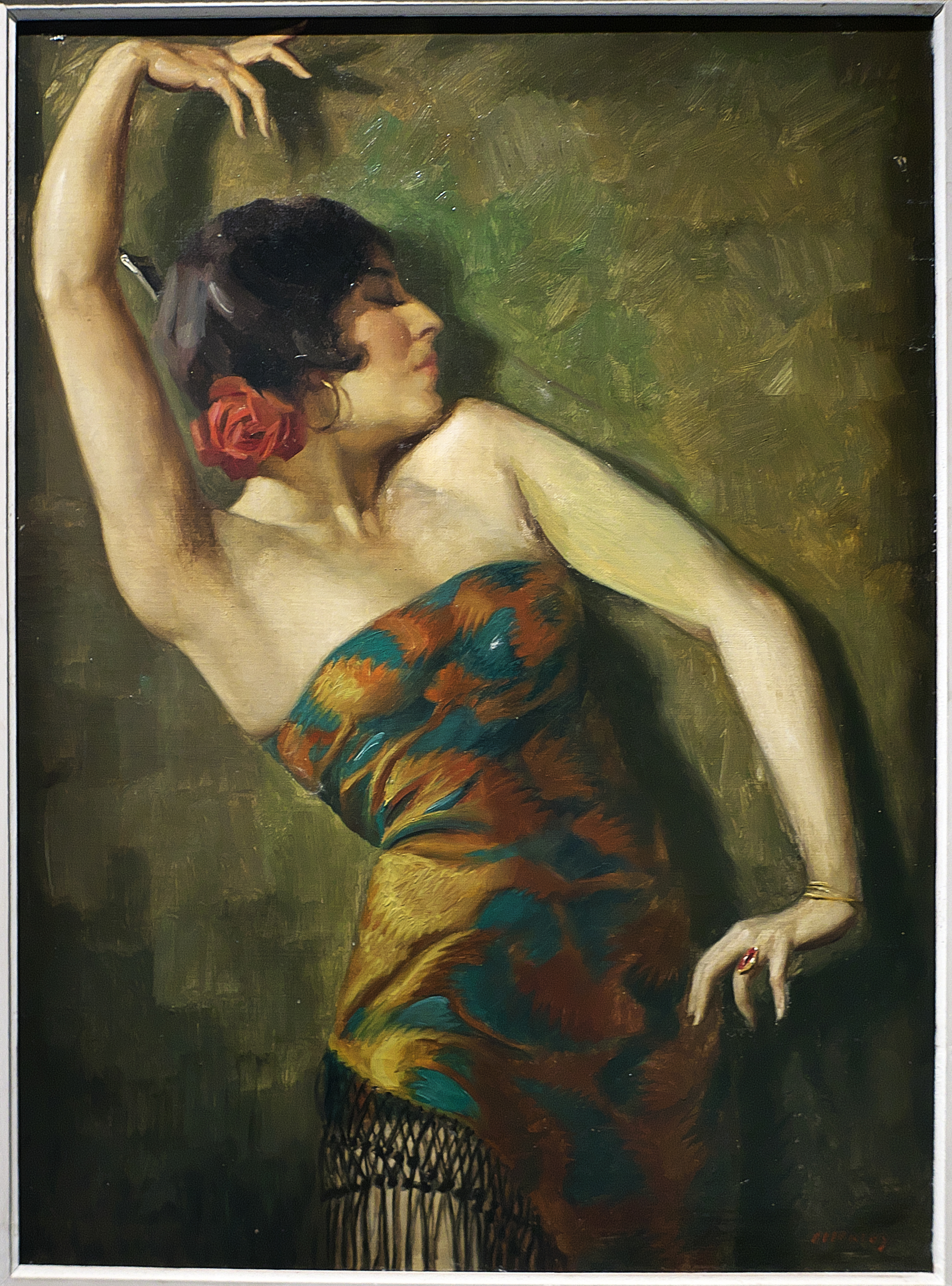
Joven bailando (c.1920)

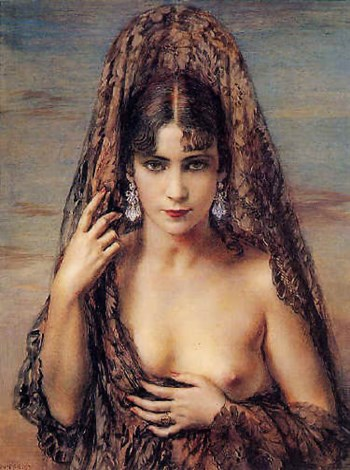
Eternal Idol - Apperley's muse, lover, and second wife, Enriqueta Contreras (1931)

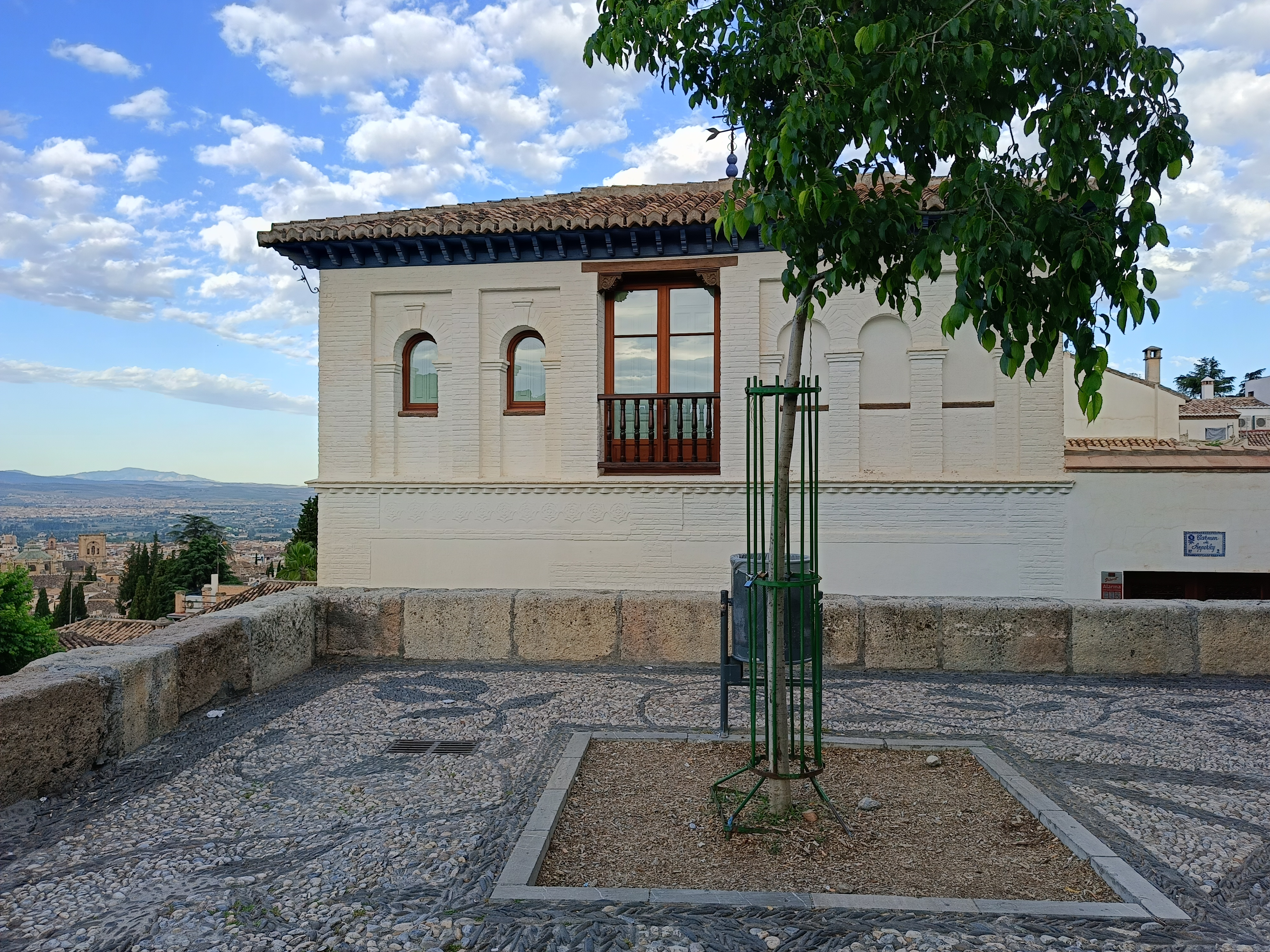
Carmen Apperley, the painter’s Albaicin home

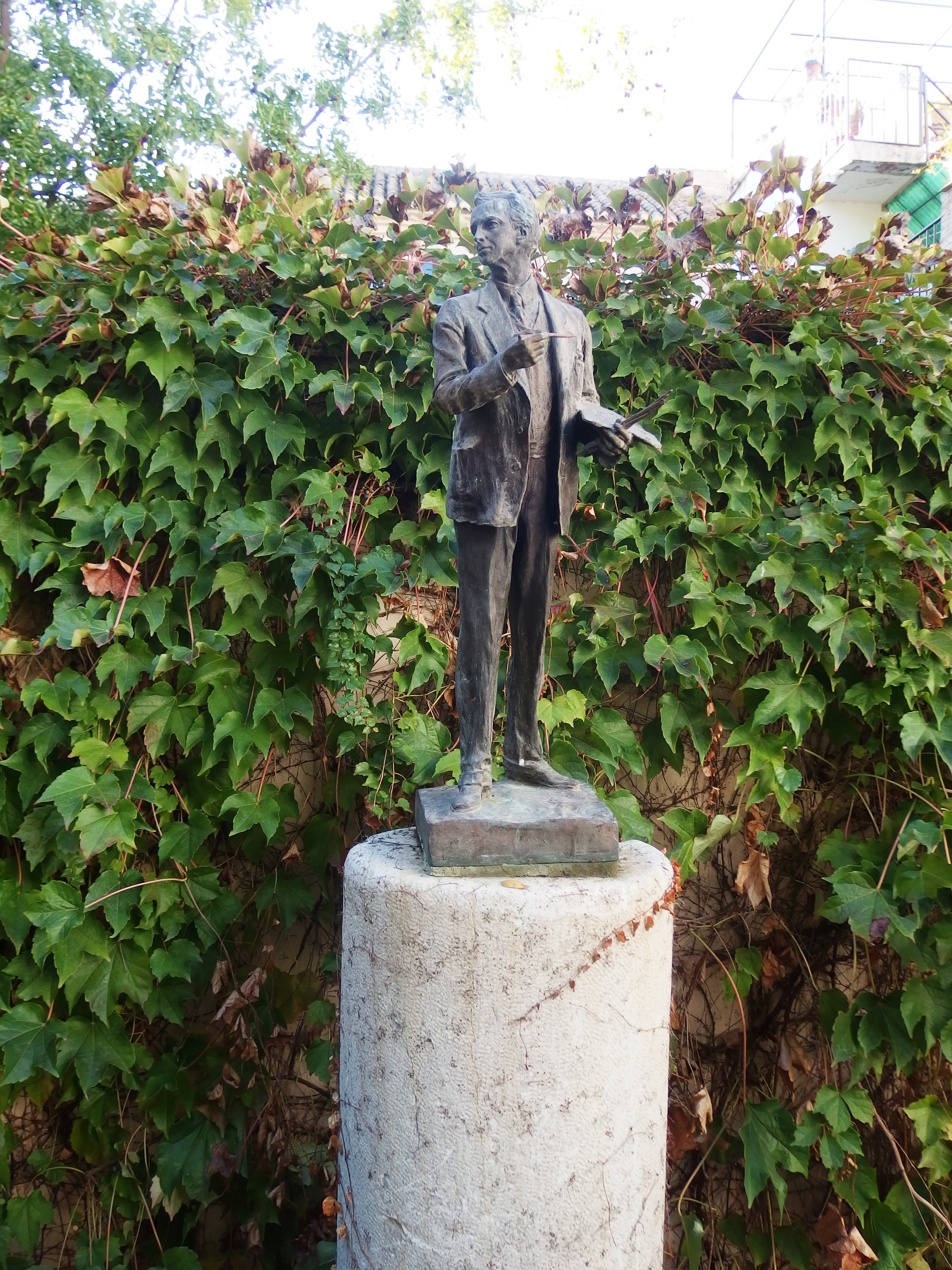
Statue commemorating Apperley in Granada (2011)

== Sources ==
- Dizy Caso, Eduardo (1997). Les orientalistes de l'ecole espagnole (in French). Paris: ACR. ISBN 978-2-867-70106-1.
- Requesens, Cesar (2016). Secret Granada. Versailles, France: Jonglez Publishing. ISBN 978-2-361-95025-5.
