= William Jenkins (curator) =

American photography curator and educator

- Education: St. Lawrence University (BA); Visual Studies Workshop (MA)
- Occupations: Photography curator, educator
- Employer: Arizona State University
- Known for: New Topographics (1975)

William Jenkins is an American photography curator and educator. He organized the 1975 exhibition New Topographics: Photographs of a Man-Altered Landscape at the George Eastman House in Rochester, New York. The exhibition has been described as a turning point in the history of photography. The term "New Topographics," introduced in connection with the exhibition, has since been adopted as a broader descriptor for a genre of landscape photography.

== Early life and education ==
Jenkins majored in economics at St. Lawrence University, where he took photography workshops taught by Minor White and Paul Caponigro. He later earned a master's degree at the Visual Studies Workshop, affiliated with the State University of New York at Buffalo.

== Career at George Eastman House ==
Jenkins began working at the International Museum of Photography at the George Eastman House in Rochester, New York, where he eventually became Curator of Twentieth-Century Photography. He left in 1979 to join the faculty of Arizona State University.

=== New Topographics exhibition ===
New Topographics: Photographs of a Man-Altered Landscape was held at the International Museum of Photography at George Eastman House from October 14, 1975, to February 2, 1976. The exhibition presented artists who depicted the built, or human-made, environment in a detached manner. Jenkins selected eight American photographers: Robert Adams, Lewis Baltz, Joe Deal, Frank Gohlke, Nicholas Nixon, John Schott, Stephen Shore, and Henry Wessel Jr., and also included the German couple Bernd and Hilla Becher, who were then teaching at the Kunstakademie Düsseldorf and whose work had been brought to Jenkins's attention by the Sonnabend Gallery in New York. The exhibition included 168 photographs.

Jenkins organized the exhibition in consultation with Joe Deal, who served as exhibitions manager at the Eastman House. Not all of the participating photographers agreed with the exhibition's title, and some expressed reservations about its premise. Jenkins later stated that he wished he had included Ed Ruscha in the exhibition, as it "would have fleshed out that part of it that's not quite so photographic."

In his catalog essay, Jenkins referred to Ed Ruscha's photobooks of the early 1960s, writing that the pictures were "stripped of any artistic frills and reduced to an essentially topographic state, conveying substantial amounts of visual information but eschewing entirely the aspects of beauty, emotion and opinion." He also drew connections to the tradition of nineteenth-century topographic survey photographers such as Timothy O'Sullivan and William Henry Jackson.

=== Critical reception ===
The exhibition received mixed to negative responses from some contemporary critics and visitors. Reviews described the photographs as "dull" and "flat," highlighting a perceived disconnect between the exhibition's aesthetic and prevailing expectations for landscape photography. Its focus on parking lots, tract housing, and industrial buildings, rather than traditional scenic subjects, was seen by some critics as anticlimactic or contrary to established norms.

The label "New Topographics photographers" was considered misleading and objectionable by some of the participants themselves. Jenkins's characterization of the photographs as "neutral" and without style was also debated, with critics arguing that the work conveyed implicit political meanings. Several of the participating photographers expressed ambivalence about Jenkins's claims of objectivity and neutrality; Robert Adams later stated that autobiography and metaphor were essential elements of a landscape photograph that Jenkins's framing had understated. Because the exhibition was held at a relatively remote location with limited attendance, some scholars have noted that it did not immediately accelerate the careers of its participants.

=== Legacy ===
Recognition of the exhibition's significance developed gradually, particularly during the 1980s and 1990s as its influence on subsequent photographers became more widely acknowledged. By the 2000s it had come to be regarded by some critics as one of the most influential photography exhibitions of the twentieth century.

In 2009, a large-scale restaging of the exhibition was organized at the Center for Creative Photography in Tucson, followed by presentations at the George Eastman House, the Los Angeles County Museum of Art, and the San Francisco Museum of Modern Art, among other venues, on an eight-city international tour. The exhibition subsequently traveled internationally, appearing at the Nederlands Fotomuseum in Rotterdam in 2011 and later at the Bilbao Fine Arts Museum in Spain. A scholarly catalog edited by Britt Salvesen and Alison Nordstrom and published by Steidl (Göttingen, 2009) accompanied the restaging.

The term "New Topographics" has since been adopted as the name for a broader photographic genre. Jenkins has said he remains "kind of mystified" by the way the exhibition continues to influence landscape photography. The exhibition has been described as an important influence on later developments in landscape photography, including in Europe. The work of the Düsseldorf School of Photography, sometimes referred to as the "Becher School," including Andreas Gursky, Candida Höfer, Thomas Ruff, and Thomas Struth, has been associated with a comparable aesthetic. This influence is generally understood to have been mediated through Bernd and Hilla Becher, who taught at the Kunstakademie Düsseldorf and introduced aspects of the exhibition's approach to their students. Scholars have noted that a direct influence of the exhibition on the Düsseldorf School, independent of the Bechers, has not been conclusively established. The exhibition has also been described as a turning point in postwar photography.

== Teaching ==
Jenkins joined the faculty of the School of Art at Arizona State University in 1979, where he taught photography as well as courses in speaking and writing about photographs. He is Emeritus Professor at ASU's Tempe campus. He was recognized as an Honored Educator by the Society for Photographic Education at its West Chapter conference in November 2016. He continues to photograph around his Tempe neighborhood, though constrained by mobility issues, using his smartphone, and posting the results to social media.

== Curatorial philosophy ==
Jenkins opened his catalog essay for New Topographics with the declaration that "there is little doubt that the problem at the center of this exhibition is one of style." He described the work as embodying a form of topographic neutrality, conveying visual information without the imposition of beauty, emotion, or opinion. He characterized the exhibition's viewpoint as "anthropological rather than critical, scientific rather than artistic," stating that its purpose was "simply to postulate, at least for the time being, what it means to make a documentary photograph." He also addressed photography's relationship to truth, writing that "it is precisely photography's pretence of truthfulness, its assertion of accuracy that gives it the ability to mislead so effectively." By invoking the term "topographic," Jenkins linked the work to nineteenth-century survey photographers such as Timothy O'Sullivan and William Henry Jackson.
