= Nicholas Nixon =

American photographer (born 1947)

- Born: October 27, 1947 (age 78); Detroit, Michigan, U.S.
- Education: University of Michigan (BA); University of New Mexico (MFA)
- Known for: Photographer, Arts educator
- Notable work: The Brown Sisters
- Movement: Documentary photography
- Spouse: Bebe Brown
- Children: 2

Nicholas Nixon (born October 27, 1947) is an American photographer, known for his work in black-and-white of people and cityscapes, and for using the 8×10 inch view camera.

Nixon's subjects include marginalized people living along the Charles River near Boston and in Cambridge as well as cities in the South, people nearing death in nursing homes and those who suffered from AIDS (and their families), school children and the blind, and the intimacy of couples, his family and himself, predominantly in the nude. Nixon's photographs, resulting almost exclusively in black-and-white contact prints, record his subjects with meticulous detail in portraits and close-ups in order to facilitate a connection between the viewer and the subject.

== Biography ==
Nixon was born in 1947 in Detroit, Michigan. Nixon gained a B.A. in American literature from the University of Michigan, Ann Arbor (near Detroit), in 1969, and began studying photography at the University of New Mexico in Albuquerque, where he met Beverly ("Bebe") Brown, and got married a year later in 1971. After Nixon graduated with a M.F.A. in 1974 the couple moved to Brookline near Boston where he began working as a part-time professor at the Massachusetts College of Art and Design (MCA) and continued teaching there until March 2018. Bebe worked for PBS as editor, writer and producer. They have two kids, Sam, born 1983, and Clementine, born in 1985.

== Work ==
=== The large format ===
Working in an Ann Arbor bookshop Nixon studied art books for himself and accidentally discovered a book with photographs by Henri Cartier-Bresson, which impressed him very much so, that he took a summer class in photography. Subsequently, he bought a 35 mm Leica M3, without knowing it was HCB's camera model, too, but with a wider 35 mm lens. One day in 1969 he spotted a print by Walker Evans and was "bowled over" by the "heightened, hallucinatory, voluptuous quality of the description [...] the sensual primal force was akin to Faulkner or Yeats or Joyce, my heroes at the time."

He consequently began working with large-format cameras, at first he made "hand-held landscapes" with a 4×5 inch (10×12 cm) view camera. but soon he began photographing exclusively with 8×10 inch (20×25 cm) on a tripod. Occasionally he also used an even bulkier 10x12 inch (25×30 cm) camera, and in 2015 he began photographing on huge 14×17 inch (36×43 cm) negatives to photograph his family and the project on the blind at Perkins School. Whereas most professional photographers had abandoned these cameras in favor of shooting on fast 35 mm and medium-format film with easily portable cameras, Nixon preferred the format because it allowed contact prints to be made directly from the large format negatives, retaining the clarity and integrity of the image in whole. Nixon has said "When photography went to the small camera and quick takes, it showed thinner and thinner slices of time [...] I like greater chunks, myself. Between 30 seconds and a thousandth of a second the difference is very large." The slow process also made the sitters and the photographer feel more involved with each other, the space in front of the camera becomes a stage.

=== First exhibitions ===
15 of Nixon's early city views taken of Boston (and two of Cambridge) in 1974–1975 were shown in his first group exhibition, New Topographics: Photographs of a Man-Altered Landscape at the George Eastman House in 1975, along with images of his friends Frank Gohlke, Robert Adams, Joe Deal and John Schott. Rochester was a remote place and the show was "pretty much unnoticed". In hindsight it turned out to be one of the most influential photographic exhibitions of the decade, which defined the New Topographics genre. In the small catalogue of the exhibition, William Jenkins, the show's curator who had coined the title, included short statements of some of the photographers to his introduction. There, Nixon's often cited notion first appears:

"The world is infinitely more interesting than any of my opinions concerning it."

At the time Nixon himself was more excited about his first solo exhibition that would take place only a few months later in 1976 at the Museum of Modern Art (New York) made possible by its curator John Szarkowski, the single most important promoter of new developments in photography in the 1960s and 1970s. Beside the urban vistas and some landscapes Szarkowski chose to integrate the initial two images of the series Nixon had just began to take annually of his wife Bebe Brown and her three sisters. Szarkowski was also crucial for his first Guggenheim Fellowship in 1977. "After them, people came to me, and as a result I have had the wonderful luxury of never having to worry about my career or to promote myself in any way."

=== Pictures of People ===
Nixon developed an ever growing interest in people, as they first slipped into his pictures as tiny figures and then gradually became the center of his photographs.

The Friends of Photography in Carmel, CA, staged a show of his recent work and published his first book, Photographs from One Year, in 1983. His son, Sam, was born that year, and while taking photographs of him and his wife, an interest in the nude evolved. Their daughter Clementine was born two years later, and he continued his series of family photographs, adding himself in these very intimate images in 1997, when he also introduced the vertical format to his work. Almost equally intimate were the series of portraits and close-ups he took in a nursing home, where he initially had done voluntary social work. People who were near their death became a more urgent subject, when in 1987 he began documenting people who suffered from AIDS, a viral disease almost unknown and stigmatized at that time. A main subject became Tom Moran, the speaker of the AIDS Action Committee of Massachusetts. With the project Bebe helped him, and wrote the text for the final book, People with AIDS, published in 1991.

In 1988 the Museum of Modern Art was finally again the first institution to organize a comprehensive exhibition of his latest work, which traveled subsequently to Boston, Detroit and San Francisco. Peter Galassi, an art historian he befriended when Galassi was an intern at the museum in the mid-70s, curated the show and edited the second book of Nixon's work, which comprised images of a decade, from the People series (1978–1982) to the then ongoing project of People with AIDS. It was the only project by Nixon, which was intended to be published as a book, to raise awareness of the disease. Otherwise Nixon's main objective in his work is principally the photographic print (and almost exclusively the contact print), not the photo book, as it is for many others of his colleagues (or any other form of publication).

=== Close and Far ===
In the late nineties, Nixon returned to documenting Boston's urban landscape that was changing during the Big Dig highway development project. This time he used a longer lens in order to flatten the space. Another new approach was the enlargement of these images. He also produced prints in 20 × 24 inches (about 50 × 60 cm) of The Brown Sisters series, he was astound they weren't going to be vulgar, but instead it "increased availability of zheir emotions and psychology".

These images were shown in 2003 at the Zabriskie Gallery in Manhattan under the title Close and Far, combined with close-ups of bodies (published in a book not until 2013). Lovers, a series also called Couples, originated in 1999–2001 and presented for the first time at the Fraenkel Gallery in San Francisco, which also premiered his series Patients with photographs Nixon took between 2005 and 2007 in several Boston hospitals portraying anew some severely sick people. He had already revisited the subject of sickness in 2000 with a fellowship of The George Gund Foundation, and in 2015 again on commission to portrait undergoing palliative treatments. The time he began to photograph digitally, which allowed him to get even closer to his sitters while reducing exposure times.

In 2013 he presented for the first time images in color. It was an ongoing series of close-ups of him and Bebe as a couple, who loved each other and was happy for a long time. Here, Nixon perceived Bebe as more of a collaborator. After a year of experimenting with digital photography as well as color, he abonded both again unsatisfied with the results that could rival analog black-and-white prints.

=== Retrospectives ===
In 2017, when Nixon became 70 years old, the a major retrospective exhibition was directed by the Spanish Fundación Mapfre in Madrid in cooperation with C/O Berlin in the capital of Germany, which traveled also to Almería and Brussels to respective institutions for photography there. The show was accompanied by a comprehensive publication. In 2021, the photographic gallery Le château d'eau in Toulouse presented the first major exhibition of Nixon's work in France, accompanied by an expanded catalogue as well.

=== The Brown Sisters ===
Nixon's most commonly known project, which already is part of the history of photography, The Brown Sisters, is a consistend series of an annually group portrait of his wife, Bebe, and her three younger sisters. He began to photograph them in 1975, when Bebe was 25 and her siblings were 15 (Mimi), 21 (Laurie) and 23 (Heather) years old. Her family had already the tradition of taking a family picture annually for their Christmas cards. Nixon disliked the usual "phony" smiles, and he initially discarded a first group portrait he did himself. But the following year he took a photograph of them they were all content with, and after the next one in the following year they agreed to begin a series: annually he would photograph the sisters with his 8×10 inch camera, outside in natural light, them always posing in the same already established order, and all facing the camera (which happened with only rare exceptions).

Since 1999 there were subsequently updated exhibitions and publications of the whole series. For its 30th anniversary Sarah Greenough staged an exhibition of the series at the National Gallery of Art in Washington, that subsequently traveled to the George Eastman Museum in Rochester, New York. On this occasion the Museum of Modern Art (MoMA) displayed its set for six month in their permanent collection. Since 2006 the MoMA acquires annually not only the contact print, but also an enlarged print in the format of 20 × 24 inches (about 50 × 60 cm). In 2014, the MoMA and other institutions celebrated its 40th year. Beside the MoMA the comprehensive series has been shown at the Institute of Contemporary Art, Boston, the St. Louis Art Museum, Harvard University's Fogg Art Museum, the Cincinnati Art Museum, the Modern Art Museum of Fort Worth, and e. g. by the Fundación Mapfre first in The Alhambra, Granada, Spain and their KBr Photography Center in Barcelona.

== Teaching ==
Nixon worked as a part-time professor at the Massachusetts College of Art and Design (MCA) since 1975 and continued until March 2018. Teaching gained him his financial base to be able to work independently. He didn't bother with the theory of the medium, but instead showed original prints of his own collection by photographers he wanted them to learn from, and read stories with descriptions by Flannery O'Connor, Alice Munro, Jack London, Eudora Welty and others, which the images could be compared with.

=== Allegations of inappropriate behavior ===
On March 22, 2018, Nixon retired from the Massachusetts College of Art and Design in mid-semester just after an investigation into alleged inappropriate behavior was announced. The investigation focuses on whether his conduct violated Title IX rules. The Boston Globe has also been investigating the professor since the beginning of 2018 for claims of sexual harassment. The paper interviewed more than a dozen former students who claimed the photographer asked undergraduate students to pose nude for him and made vulgar remarks in a classroom setting. On April 12, 2018, although the Institute of Contemporary Art, Boston said it would keep an exhibition of his work on view, they closed the show ten days earlier, after Nixon had asked them to. In 2021, the suit was settled, resolving the formal complaints against Nixon.^{Ref?}

== Books ==
- Photographs from One Year (Untitled 31). Introduction by Robert Adams. Carmel, CA: The Friends of Photography, 1983. ISBN 0-933286-33-3 (exhibition catalogue).
- Galassi, Peter (1988). Nicholas Nixon – Pictures of People (exhibition catalogue). New York: Museum of Modern Art. ISBN 0-87070-438-9.
- Nicholas and Bebe Nixon. People with AIDS. Boston, MA: David R. Godine, 1991.
- Family Pictures (Photographers at Work). Washington, DC: Smithsonian, 1991. ISBN 1-560-98049-4.
- Thomas Weski. Nicholas Nixon: Familienbilder, Hannover, Germany: Sprengel Museum, 1994. ISBN 3-89169-076-2 (exhibition catalogue, in German).
- School. Text by Robert Coles. Boston: Bulfinch and Little, Brown & Co, 1998. ISBN 0-8212-2501-4.
- The Brown Sisters. Afterword by Peter Galassi. New York: The Museum of Modern Art and Harry N. Abrams, 1999. ISBN 0-87070-042-1 (comprising the first 25 images of 25 years; reprint in 2002).
  - The Brown Sisters: Thirty-three Years. New York: Museum of Modern Art, 2007. ISBN 978-0-87070-719-3.
- Carlos Gollonet Carnicero. Nicholas Nixon. Murcia, Spain: TF Editores, 2003. ISBN 978-84-89162-10-5 (in Spanish and English).
- Home. Revere, PE: Lodima Press, 2005. EAN 18888991822005.
- Las Hermanas Brown 1975–2007. Madrid: Fundación Mapfre, 2008. ISBN 978-84-9844-108-6.
  - expanded edition 2011: [...] 1975–2010. ISBN 978-84-9244-119-8.
  - expanded edition 2021: [...] 1975–2020. Texts by Laura Terré and Joan Fontcuberta. ISBN 978-84-9844-772-9 (in Spanish).
  - English edition 2025: The Sisters Brown 1975–2022, ISBN 978-84-9844-884-9.
- Live, Love, Look, Last. Göttingen, Germany: Steidl, 2009. ISBN 978-3-8693-0026-9.
- Close Far. Göttingen: Steidl, 2013. ISBN 978-3-8693-0536-3.
- The Brown Sisters: Forty Years. Afterword by Sarah Hermanson Meister. New York: Museum of Modern Art, 2014. ISBN 978-0-87070-953-1 (exhibition catalogue).
- About Forty Years. Introduction by Jeffrey Fraenkel. San Francisco: Fraenkel Gallery, 2015. ISBN 978-1-8813-3742-3 (exhibition catalogue).
- Gollonet Carnicero, Carlos (2017). Nicholas Nixon (exhibition catalogue). Madrid and Berlin: Fundación Mapfre/Kehrer. ISBN 978-3-86828-828-5.
- Jordan Alves (ed.). Une intime distance. Paris: Editions Xavier Barral, 2021. ISBN 978-2-36511-295-6 (exhibition catalogue Toulouse, in French).
  - English edition: Closing the Distance. Berlin: Hatje Cantz, 2021. ISBN 978-3-7757-5189-6 (in English).

== Exhibitions ==
Work by Nicholas Nixon appeared in countless group exhibitions in the States and abroad, often surveys on recent American photography, but especially in shows at the Museum of Modern Art. His work was sometimes coupled with other photographers like Stephen Shore (Worcester Art Museum, MA, 1977) or William Eggleston (Cronin Gallery, Houston, TX, 1978, several times at the Fraenkel Gallery since 1980).

He first appeared in a group show in Japan in 1982. First solo exhibitions in Europe came about in London in 1989 at the Victoria and Albert Museum, in Germany in 1994 curated by Thomas Weski at the Sprengel Museum Hannover (where Weski included him in the major survey How You Look at It in 2000, a precursor to the seminal 2003 show Cruel and Tender, jointly organized with Emma Dexter for the Tate Modern in London and the Museum Ludwig in Cologne). In France his work was first shown at the Musée d'Art Moderne de Paris in 1995. A retrospective exhibition traveled through Spain over three years, accompanied by a comprehensive publication on his work.

Nixon was represented (not exclusively) in Boston by the Vision Gallery and since 1991 by Barbara Krakow, in New York first by the Light Gallery (1978–1981), since 1984 by Pace/McGill and the Zabriskie Gallery since 1988, and on the West Coast since 1980 by the Fraenkel Gallery in San Francisco.

=== Selected solo shows ===
- Longer Views: 40 Photographs by Nick Nixon, Museum of Modern Art, New York, NY, 1976
- Rochester Institute of Technology, Rochester, NY, 1982
- Nicholas Nixon: Pictures of One Year, travel exhibition: Institute of Contemporary Art, Boston, Madison Art Center, Madison, WI, Friends of Photography, Carmel, CA, and the Corcoran Gallery of Art, Washington, DC, 1983–1984
- California Museum of Photography, Riverside, CA, 1984
- Art Institute of Chicago, IL, 1985
- Ackland Art Museum, University of North Carolina, Chapel Hill, 1985
- Nicholas Nixon: Pictures of People, Museum of Modern Art, New York, NY, 1988, traveled to the Museum of Fine Arts, Boston, the Detroit Institute of Arts, the San Francisco Museum of Modern Art, CA, and the Victoria and Albert Museum, London (until November 1989), first solo show in a British museum
- Nicholas Nixon: Familienbilder, Sprengel Museum, Hannover 1994, first solo show in a German museum
- Nicholas Nixon: Pictures of People, Musée d'Art Moderne de Paris, France, 1995, first solo show in a French museum
- Human Experience: Photographs by Nicholas Nixon, Cincinnati Art Museum, Cincinnati, OH, 2001
- Nicholas Nixon, retrospective exhibition traveling through Spain: Seville, Gijón, Murcia, Malaga a. o., 2003–2006
- Nicholas Nixon, National Gallery of Art, November 13, 2005 – February 20, 2006 (exclusively showing 30 years of The Brown Sisters), subsequently went to the George Eastman House, Rochester, NY
- Nicholas Nixon: The Brown Sisters 1975–2008, Fundación Mapfre, Madrid, Spain, 2008; traveled to The Alhambra, Granada, Spain, 2009
- Nicholas Nixon: Family Album, Museum of Fine Arts, Boston, July 28, 2010 – May 1, 2011
- Nicholas Nixon - New Work, Fraenkel Gallery, San Francisco, 2013
- Nicholas Nixon: Forty Years of The Brown Sisters, Museum of Modern Art, New York, NY, Nov 22, 2014 – Jan 4, 2015
- Nicholas Nixon: About Forty Years, Fraenkel Gallery, San Francisco, 2015, retrospective exhibition
- Nicholas Nixon, Fundación Mapfre, Madrid, Spain, September 14, 2017 – January 7, 2018, retrospective exhibition traveling to Centro Andaluz de la Fotografía, Almería, Spain, C/O Berlin, Berlin, Germany and Fondation A Stichting, Brussels, Belgium (until April 2019)
- Nicholas Nixon: Persistence of Vision, Institute of Contemporary Art, Boston, 2018, retrospective exhibition
- Nicholas Nixon: Un intime distance, Le château d'eau, Toulouse, France, November 3, 2021– January 16, 2022

== Awards ==
- 1976, 1980, 1987: National Endowment for the Arts Photography Fellowship
- 1977, 1986: John Simon Guggenheim Memorial Foundation Fellowship
- 1982: Massachusetts Council of the Arts "New Works" Grant
- 1984: Institute of Contemporary Art, Boston, Englehard Award
- 1988: Friends of Photography Peer Award
- 2000: The George Gund Foundation Fellowship

== Collections ==
- Museum of Modern Art, New York City
- Amon Carter Museum, Fort Worth, TX
- Art Institute of Chicago, Chicago, IL
- Baltimore Museum of Art, Baltimore, MD
- Bibliothèque nationale de France, Paris, France
- Cleveland Museum of Art, Cleveland, OH
- Dallas Museum of Art, Dallas, TX
- Denver Art Museum, Denver, CO
- Detroit Institute of Arts, Detroit, MI
- Harvard Art Museums, Harvard University, Cambridge, MA
- High Museum of Art, Atlanta, GA
- Institute of Contemporary Art, Boston, MA
- George Eastman Museum, Rochester, NY
- J. Paul Getty Museum, Los Angeles, CA
- Los Angeles County Museum, Los Angeles, CA
- Metropolitan Museum of Art, New York, NY
- Musee d’Art Moderne de Paris, Paris, France
- Museum of Contemporary Photography, Chicago, IL
- Museum of Fine Arts, Boston, MA
- Museum of Fine Arts, Houston, TX
- Museum of Modern Art, New York, NY
- Museum of Photographic Arts, San Diego, CA
- National Gallery of Art, Washington, DC
- National Gallery of Australia, Parkes, Australia
- National Gallery of Canada, Ottawa, Canada
- New Mexico Museum of Art, Santa Fe, NM
- Philadelphia Museum of Art, Philadelphia, PA
- San Francisco Museum of Modern Art, San Francisco, Ca
- Seattle Art Museum, Seattle, WA
- Saint Louis Art Museum, St. Louis, MO
- Smithsonian American Art Museum, Washington, DC
- Sprengel Museum, Hannover, Germany
- The Do Good Fund, Columbus, GA
- Tokyo Metropolitan Museum, Tokyo, Japan
- Victoria & Albert Museum, London, England
