= Robert Adams (photographer) =

American photographer (born 1937)

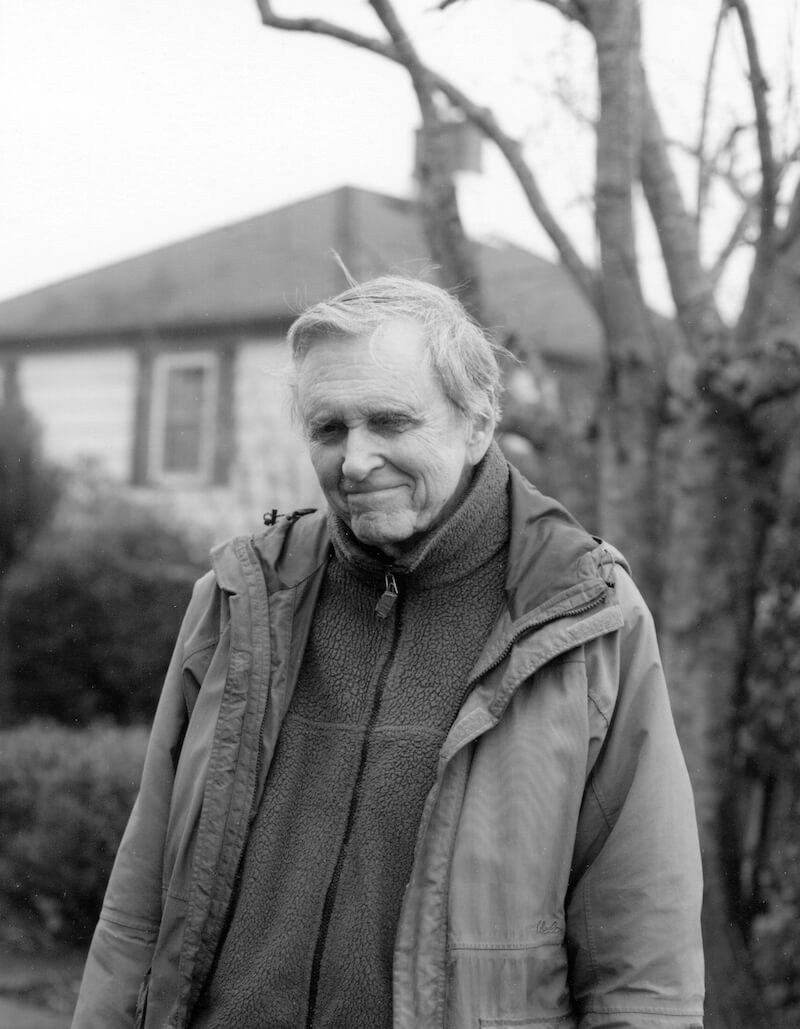
- Born: 1937 (age 88–89); Orange, New Jersey
- Education: University of Redlands University of Southern California
- Known for: Photography
- Movement: New Topographics
- Awards: Deutsche Börse Photography Prize; 2006 Turning Back; Hasselblad Award; 2009
- Elected: American Academy of Arts and Letters
- Website: media.artgallery.yale.edu/adams/

Robert Adams (born 1937) is an American photographer who has focused on the changing landscape of the American West. His work first came to prominence in the mid-1970s through his book The New West (1974) and his participation in the exhibition New Topographics: Photographs of a Man-Altered Landscape in 1975, which helped to define the New Topographics genre. He has received two Guggenheim Fellowships, a MacArthur Fellowship, the Deutsche Börse Photography Prize and the Hasselblad Award.

== Early life and education ==
Robert Hickman Adams was born on May 8, 1937, in Orange, New Jersey to Lois Hickman Adams and Ross Adams. In 1940 the family moved to Madison, New Jersey where his younger sister Carolyn was born. Then in 1947 they moved to Madison, Wisconsin for five years, where he contracted polio at age 12 in 1949 in his back, left arm, and hand but was able to recover. They moved one last time, in 1952, to Wheat Ridge, Colorado, a suburb of Denver, when his father secured a job in Denver. They moved to Colorado partly because of the chronic bronchial problems that he suffered from in Madison, New Jersey around age 5 as an attempt to help alleviate those problems. He continued to suffer from asthma and allergy problems.

During his childhood, Adams often accompanied his father on walks and hikes through the woods on Sunday afternoons. He also enjoyed playing baseball in open fields and working with his father on carpentry projects. He was an active Boy Scout, and was also active with the Methodist church that his family attended. He and his father made several raft trips through Dinosaur National Monument, and during his adolescent years he worked at boys' camps at Rocky Mountain National Park in Colorado. He also took trips on pack horses and went mountain climbing. He and his sister began visiting Denver Art Museum. Adams also learned to like reading. In 1955, he hunted for the last time.

Adams enrolled in the University of Colorado, Boulder in 1955, and attended it for his first year, but decided to transfer the next year to the University of Redlands in California where he received his B.A. in English in 1959. He continued his graduate studies at the University of Southern California and received his PhD in English Literature, in 1965.

In 1960 while at Redlands, he met and married Kerstin Mornestam, a Swedish native, who shared the same interest in the arts and nature. Robert and Kerstin spent their first few summers together in Oregon along the coast, where they took long walks on the beach and spent their evenings reading.

== Work ==
Adams' On Signal Hill, Overlooking Long Beach, 1983, gelatin-silver print, 9 x 11 inches

In 1963 they moved back to Colorado, and Adams began teaching English at Colorado College in Colorado Springs. In 1963, Adams bought a 35 mm camera and began to take pictures mostly of nature and architecture. He soon read complete sets of Camera Work and Aperture at the Colorado Springs Fine Arts Center. He learned photographic technique from Myron Wood, a professional photographer who lived in Colorado. While finishing his dissertation, he began to photograph in 1964. In 1966, he began to teach only part-time to have more time to photograph. He met John Szarkowski, the curator of photography at the Museum of Modern Art, on a trip to New York City in 1969. The museum later bought four of his prints. In 1970, he began working as a full-time photographer.

Critic Sean O'Hagan, writing in The Guardian, said "his subject has been the American west: its vastness, its sparse beauty and its ecological fragility. [. . .] What he has photographed constantly – in varying shades of grey – is what has been lost and what remains" and that "his work's other great subtext" is silence.

== Publications ==
- White Churches of the Plains. Boulder, CO: Colorado Associated University Press, 1970.
- The Architecture and Art of Early Hispanic Colorado. Boulder, CO: Colorado Associated University Press, 1974.
- The New West: Landscapes Along the Colorado Front Range. Boulder, CO: Colorado Associated University Press, 1974.
- Denver: A Photographic Survey of the Metropolitan Area. Boulder, CO: Colorado Associated University Press, 1977.
- Prairie. Denver: Denver Art Museum, 1978.
- From the Missouri West. Aperture, 1980.
- Beauty in Photography: Essays in Defense of Traditional Values. Millerton, NY: Aperture, 1981.
- Summer Nights, Walking. Millerton, NY: Aperture; New Haven, CT: Yale University Art Gallery, 1982.
- Our Lives and Our Children: Photographs Taken Near the Rocky Flats Nuclear Weapons Plant. Millerton, NY: Aperture, 1984.
- Summer Nights. New York: Aperture, 1985.
- Los Angeles Spring. New York: Aperture, 1986.
- Perfect Times, Perfect Places. New York: Aperture. 1988.
- To Make It Home: Photographs of the American West. New York: Aperture, 1989.
- Cottonwoods. Washington D.C.: Smithsonian Institution Press, 1995.
- Listening to the River: Seasons in the American West. New York: Aperture, 1994.
- Why People Photograph: Selected Essays and Reviews by Robert Adams. New York: Aperture. 1994; 2004. ISBN 978-0-89381-603-2.
- West from the Columbia: Views at the River Mouth. New York: Aperture, 1995.
- Beauty in Photography. New York: Aperture, 1996.
- What We Bought: The New World, Scenes from the Denver Metropolitan Area, 1970–1974. Hannover, Germany: Stiftung Niedersachsen, 1995. 2nd edition, New Haven, CT: Yale University Art Gallery, 2009.
- Eden. New York: Roth Horowitz, 1999.
- I Hear the Leaves and Love the Light. Tucson, AZ: Nazraeli, 1999.
- Notes for Friends: Along Colorado Roads. Boulder: University Press of Colorado, 1999.
- California: Views by Robert Adams of the Los Angeles Basin 1978–1983. San Francisco: Fraenkel Gallery; New York: Matthew Marks Gallery, 2000.
- Boddhisattva: A Gandharan Face. Tucson, AZ: Nazraeli, 2001.
- Alders. Tucson, AZ: Nazraeli, 2002.
- Sunlight, Solitude, Democracy, Home. Portland, OR: Douglas F. Cooley Memorial Art Gallery, Reed College, 2002.
- Commercial Residential. New York: Roth Horowitz, 2003.
- No Small Journeys: Across Shopping Center Parking Lots, Down City Streets, 1979–1982. New York: Matthew Marks Gallery, 2003.
- Pine Valley. Tucson, AZ: Nazraeli, 2005.
- A Portrait in Landscapes. Tucson, AZ: Nazraeli, 2005.
- Turning Back: A Photographic Journal of Re-exploration. San Francisco: Fraenkel Gallery; New York: Matthew Marks Gallery, 2005.
- Along Some Rivers: Photographs and Conversation. New York: Aperture. 2006.
- Interiors 1973–1974. Tucson, AZ: Nazraeli, 2006.
- Still Lives at Manzanita. Tucson, AZ: Nazraeli, 2006.
- Questions for an Overcast Day. Matthew Marks Gallery, New York; San Francisco: Fraenkel Gallery, 2007.
- Time Passes. Paris: Foundation Cartier pour l'Art Contemporain, 2007.
- Close at Hand. Revere, PA: Lodima, 2008.
- Denver: A Photographic Survey of the Metropolitan Area, 1970–1974. Rev. edition, New Haven, CT: Yale University Art Gallery. 2009.
- Summer Nights, Walking: Along the Colorado Front Range, 1976–1982. New York: Aperture; New Haven, CT: Yale University Art Gallery. 2009.
- Tree Line: Hasselblad Award 2009. Göteborg, Sweden: Hasselblad Foundation; Göttingen, Germany: Steidl, 2010.
- Gone? Colorado in the 1980s. Göttingen, Germany: Steidl 2010.
- What Can We Believe Where? Photographs of the American West, New Haven, CT: Yale University Art Gallery. 2010.
- The Place We Live, a Retrospective Selection of Photographs, 1964–2009. New Haven, CT: Yale University Art Gallery. 2010.
- Sea Stories. New Haven, CT: Yale University Art Gallery. 2011.
- This Day: Photographs from Twenty-Five Years, The Northwest Coast. New Haven, CT: Yale University Art Gallery. 2011.
- Light Balances & ON Any Given Day in Spring. New York: Matthew Marks Gallery; San Francisco: Fraenkel Gallery, 2012.
- Prairie. New Haven, CT: Yale University Art Gallery. 2012.
- Skogen. New Haven, CT: Yale University Art Gallery. 2012.
- The Question of Hope: Photographs in Western Oregon. Portland, OR: Nazraeli, 2013. ISBN 978-1-59005-382-9. The colophon says "Published on the occasion of the exhibition "The Question of Hope: Robert Adams in Western Oregon," organized by the Portland Art Museum, September 7, 2013 – January 5, 2014". Essay by Julia Dolan.
- Art Can Help. New Haven, CT: Yale University Art Gallery. 2017.
- American Silence: The Photographs of Robert Adams. New York: Aperture, 2021. Photographs by Adams. Authored by Sarah Greenough. ISBN 9781597115117. With an afterword by Terry Tempest Williams.

== Exhibitions ==
- 1975: New Topographics: Photographs of a Man-Altered Landscape, International Museum of Photography, George Eastman House, Rochester, New York, January 1975. Curated by William Jenkins. Included work by Adams, Lewis Baltz, Joe Deal, Frank Gohlke, Nicholas Nixon, John Schott, Stephen Shore and Henry Wessel, Jr.
- 1989: The Philadelphia Museum of Art. Mid-career retrospective.
- 2005–2006: Turning Back, Haus der Kunst, Munich, Germany, 2005; San Francisco Museum of Modern Art, San Francisco, 2005; Matthew Marks Gallery, New York, 2006; Center for Creative Photography, Tucson.
- 2008, Rencontres d'Arles festival, Arles, France.
- 2011: Landscape with Path: Nebraska State Highway 2, High Line Park, New York.
- 2010–2014: The Place We Live, a Retrospective Selection of Photographs. Retrospective. Vancouver Art Gallery, British Columbia, 2010–2011; Denver Art Museum, 2011–2012; Los Angeles County Museum of Art, 2012; Yale University Art Gallery, New Haven, Connecticut, 2012; Museo Nacional Centro de Arte Reina Sofía, Madrid, 2013; Josef-Albers-Museum, Quadrat, Bottrop, Germany, 2013; Galerie nationale du Jeu de Paume, Paris, 2014; Fotomuseum Winterthur, Switzerland, 2014.
- 2012: On Any Given Day in Spring and Light Balances, Matthew Marks Gallery, New York
- 2015: Green/Gray: Photographs in the Los Angeles Basin, Matthew Marks Gallery, Los Angeles
- 2018: A Right to Stand, Fondation A Stichting, Brussels. Traveled to Henri Cartier-Bresson Foundation, Paris (catalogue)
- 2022: American Silence: The Photographs of Robert Adams, National Gallery of Art, Washington, D.C.

== Awards ==
- 1973: Guggenheim Fellowship from the John Simon Guggenheim Memorial Foundation.
- 1973: Photographer's Fellowship from the National Endowment for the Arts.
- 1978: Photographer's Fellowship from the National Endowment for the Arts.
- 1980: Guggenheim Fellowship from the John Simon Guggenheim Memorial Foundation.
- 1982: Peer Award from The Friends of Photography, San Francisco.
- 1987: Charles Pratt Memorial Award.
- 1994: MacArthur Fellowship from the MacArthur Foundation.
- 1995: Spectrum International Prize for Photography from the Foundation of Lower Saxony.
- 2006: Deutsche Börse Photography Prize for the exhibition Turning Back at Haus der Kunst, Munich, Germany.
- 2009: Hasselblad Award
- 2014: Elected to American Academy of Arts and Letters
- 2020: Induction into the International Photography Hall of Fame and Museum.

== Collections ==
Adams' work is held in the following public collections:

- Portland Art Museum, Portland, OR
- Milwaukee Art Museum, Milwaukee, WI
- Whitney Museum of American Art, New York
- Museum of Modern Art, New York
- The Metropolitan Museum of Art, New York
- Denver Art Museum, Denver, CO
- Amon Carter Museum, Fort Worth, TX
- Middlebury College Museum of Art, Middlebury, VT
- Yale University Art Gallery, New Haven, CT
- National Gallery of Art, Washington, D.C.
- Philadelphia Museum of Art, Philadelphia, PA
