= John Schott =

American photographer (born 1944)

- Born: 1944 (age 81–82)
- Education: University of Michigan
- Known for: Photography
- Movement: New Topographics

John Schott (born 1944) is an American photographer, filmmaker, and academic. His work first came to prominence through his participation in New Topographics: Photographs of a Man-Altered Landscape, the 1975 exhibition at the George Eastman House. He taught at Carleton College from 1979 to 2017.

== Education and early life ==
Schott received a Bachelor of Arts in Political Science from the University of Michigan in 1965, where he also pursued graduate studies in the History of Art. He was elected to the Michigan Society of Fellows from 1973 to 1975, receiving three years of support to work on projects of his choosing.

== Career ==
=== Teaching ===
Schott joined Carleton College in 1979 as Henry Luce Professor of Creative Arts. In 1984 he became the James Woodward Strong Professor of the Liberal Arts and director of the media studies program, positions he held until his retirement in 2017.

=== Photography ===
==== New Topographics exhibition ====
In 1975, Schott was included in New Topographics: Photographs of a Man-Altered Landscape, organized by William Jenkins at the George Eastman House in Rochester, New York. The exhibition signaled a shift away from traditional landscape photography toward unromanticized views of industrial landscapes and suburban sprawl. The other photographers were Robert Adams, Lewis Baltz, Bernd and Hilla Becher, Joe Deal, Frank Gohlke, Nicholas Nixon, Stephen Shore, and Henry Wessel. In 2010, Steidl published a retrospective book on the exhibition.

==== Route 66 ====
In 1973, Schott drove Route 66 from the Midwest to California and back, photographing roadside motels with an 8x10-inch Deardorff view camera. The series was included in the New Topographics exhibition and published by Nazraeli Press in 2014 as Route 66: 1973-1974. Some critics have viewed the work as a romanticization of American road culture rather than the dispassionate documentary stance associated with the other New Topographics photographers.

==== Mobile Homes ====
In 1975 and 1976, Schott photographed mobile home communities along the west coast, again using an 8x10-inch view camera. The series was published by Nazraeli Press in 2015 as Mobile Homes: 1975-1976.

=== Film and television ===
==== Documentary films ====
In 1973, Schott co-directed, with E.J. Vaughn, America's Pop Collector: Robert C. Scull — Contemporary Art at Auction, a documentary about the sale of Robert Scull's contemporary art collection. The film was screened at the Whitney Museum of American Art in 1974. In 2004, the film was screened at the Getty Center as part of a scholarly discussion with art historian Serge Guilbaut. In 1977, he co-directed, with Vaughn, Deal, a cinéma vérité documentary about the television game show Let's Make a Deal.

In 1984, Schott wrote and directed Image and Message: A Conversation Between John Schott and Estelle Jussim, a documentary produced by the Walker Art Center to accompany their exhibition The 20th-Century Poster: Design of the Avant-Garde.

=== Television series ===
==== Alive from Off Center ====
Alive from Off Center was a PBS performing arts series produced by the Walker Art Center in collaboration with Twin Cities Public Television, founded by Melinda Ward and first broadcast in 1984. Schott served as producer from 1985 and executive producer from 1988 to 1990. Among the works produced during his tenure were:

- Ilé Aiyé (1989), a documentary on Candomblé in Brazil directed by David Byrne, later released as a standalone film.
- FunHouse (1987), written and performed by Eric Bogosian.
- Tribute to Georges Méliès (1989), a homage to the pioneering French filmmaker, telecast July 6, 1989.
- Operation X (1987), hosted by Laurie Anderson.

During the same period Schott produced three 13-part anthology series for The Learning Channel: Declarations of Independents (1987), Spirit of Place (1988), and Distant Lives (1990).

==== Independent Television Service ====
In 1991, as the first executive director of the Independent Television Service (ITVS), Schott oversaw the organization's first grants of approximately $3 million to 26 programs. In 1999, he was executive producer of the PBS series American Photography: A Century of Images.

== Collections ==
Schott's work is held in the following public collections:

- George Eastman Museum, Rochester, New York
- Museum of Modern Art, New York
- San Francisco Museum of Modern Art
- Nelson-Atkins Museum of Art, Kansas City
- National Gallery of Art, Washington, D.C.

== Awards ==
- 1976: National Endowment for the Arts Individual Artist Photography Fellowship
- 1978: National Endowment for the Arts Visual Artists' Fellowship in Photography
- 1982: Individual Artist Fellowship, Minnesota State Arts Board
