= Britt Salvesen =

American photography curator and writer

- Education: Courtauld Institute of Art (MA); University of Chicago (PhD)
- Alma mater: Trinity University
- Occupations: Curator, writer
- Employer: Los Angeles County Museum of Art
- Known for: Photography, prints and drawings

Britt Salvesen is an American curator and writer specialising in photography, prints, and drawings. Since 2009 she has been curator and head of the Wallis Annenberg Photography Department and the Prints and Drawings Department at the Los Angeles County Museum of Art (LACMA). Before joining LACMA she led the Center for Creative Photography at the University of Arizona as director and chief curator. She has published extensively as a catalogue essayist and editor on subjects including landscape photography, perception, digital art, and film history.

== Early life and education ==
Salvesen was born and raised in Wisconsin. She received her undergraduate degree from Trinity University in San Antonio, subsequently earning a Master of Arts from the Courtauld Institute of Art in London, where she held an internship at the Victoria and Albert Museum. She completed a PhD at the University of Chicago, where she was awarded a Rhodes Curatorial Fellowship and a Paul Mellon Fellowship. Her doctoral dissertation examined the Victorian stereoscope and its cultural history.

== Career ==
Following completion of her doctorate, Salvesen worked for a decade at the Art Institute of Chicago editing scholarly publications on artists including Van Gogh, Gauguin, Moreau, and Whistler. She subsequently held a curatorial position at the Milwaukee Art Museum specialising in prints, drawings, and photographs.

In 2004, she was appointed curator at the Center for Creative Photography (CCP) at the University of Arizona, where she later became director and chief curator.

She joined the Los Angeles County Museum of Art in October 2009 as curator and head of both the Wallis Annenberg Photography Department and the Prints and Drawings Department, following a departmental reorganisation. She succeeded Charlotte Cotton in photography and Kevin Salatino in prints and drawings, Salatino having become director of the Bowdoin College Museum of Art.

== Curatorial approach ==
Salvesen participated in a five-year initiative at LACMA to reconceive the presentation of the museum's collection in the Zumthor-designed Geffen Galleries, scheduled to open in 2026. The project encouraged cross-departmental collaboration and sought to move beyond conventional Eurocentric and medium-specific frameworks. Her approach requires curators to develop new interpretive connections grounded in their familiarity with collections while extending beyond established specialisations.

A recurring aspect of Salvesen's work is the incorporation of multiple or competing historical narratives within exhibitions; in her treatment of Neoclassicism, for example, she emphasised contemporaneous critiques of the movement, citing Goya as an artist who challenged its emphasis on rationality by foregrounding political instability and social inequities. She has also originated exhibitions that bring together artists in unexpected dialogue, as with The Sun and Other Stars: Katy Grannan and Charlie White (2012).

Her work has consistently engaged photography's relationship to its own history. On the work of Catherine Opie, she contrasted artists who employ photography without engaging its historical context with those who sustain a critical awareness of its traditions while continuing to experiment.

Perception has been a recurring theme: 3D: Double Vision (2018–2019), the first survey of stereoscopic and three-dimensional imaging in a North American art museum, explored three-dimensional imaging as a direct engagement with the processes of visual perception. Her practice also emphasises collaboration and cross-cultural exchange.

== Writing ==
Salvesen has published catalogue essays, monographs, and edited volumes. Her 2006 monograph Harry Callahan: The Photographer at Work, co-published by the Center for Creative Photography and Yale University Press with a foreword by John Szarkowski, sought "to reconstruct as best we can the creative process that led to his photographic breakthroughs".

Since her doctoral research on the Victorian stereoscope, Salvesen's writing has addressed the relationship between photography, science, and technology. It recurs in See the Light (2013), which examined connections between photography, neuroscience, and perception, in 3D: Double Vision (2018), a survey of the history of three-dimensional imaging, and in her contribution to Coded: Art Enters the Computer Age, 1952–1982 (2023), where she argued that an emphasis on technical processes can obscure artistic aims. Digital Witness (2024) extends this inquiry into digital imaging and manipulation.

Landscape photography, particularly in relation to the American West, is a second recurring focus. Her work on the 1975 New Topographics exhibition includes essays situating it historically and examining its conceptual sources. She has also written on John Schott and Stephen Shore, and contributed to studies of survey photography in the visual culture of the American West.

== Exhibitions ==
=== Milwaukee Art Museum ===
At the Milwaukee Art Museum, Salvesen curated Super Hits of the '70s: Photographs from the Collection (October 8, 2004 – January 2, 2005), with works by Robert Adams, Lewis Baltz, William Eggleston, Lee Friedlander, Linda Connor, Joe Deal, John Divola, Richard Misrach, and Stephen Shore. She also curated exhibitions on Danny Lyon, Bill Brandt and Edward Weston, and presentations of 17th-century French prints and German Expressionist prints.

=== LACMA ===
Her LACMA exhibitions include:

- New Topographics (2009), accompanied by a catalogue co-authored with Allison Nordstrom
- Catherine Opie: Figure and Landscape (2010), examining gender identity and the American landscape
- Ellsworth Kelly: Prints and Paintings (2012), co-curated with Stephanie Barron, the first retrospective of Kelly's work in more than 20 years
- Sharon Lockhart | Noa Eshkol (2012), co-organised with the Israel Museum, Jerusalem, and subsequently shown at the Jewish Museum, New York
- The Sun and Other Stars: Katy Grannan and Charlie White (2012), a joint exhibition Salvesen originated
- Ed Ruscha: Standard (2012), focused on Ruscha's depictions of the Standard gas station motif
- Masterworks of Expressionist Cinema: The Golem and Its Avatars (2012), tracing the influence of the Golem myth through cinema history
- Robert Mapplethorpe: XYZ (2012)
- Under the Mexican Sky: Gabriel Figueroa – Art and Film (2013), examining the cinematographer's relationship to Mexican visual culture
- John Divola: As Far as I Could Get (2013), co-curated with Karen Sinsheimer and Kathleen Howe; shown at three California venues
- See the Light: Photography, Perception, Cognition (2013), drawn from the Marjorie and Leonard Vernon Collection
- Haunted Screens: German Cinema in the 1920s (2014), examining the visual culture of Weimar-era film
- Robert Mapplethorpe: The Perfect Medium (2016), co-organised with the J. Paul Getty Museum and subsequently toured internationally
- Guillermo del Toro: At Home with Monsters (2016), which later travelled to the Minneapolis Institute of Art and the Art Gallery of Ontario
- 3D: Double Vision (2018–2019), the first survey of stereoscopic and three-dimensional imaging in a North American art museum
- City of Cinema: Paris 1850–1907 (2022), co-curated with Leah Rosenblatt Lehmbeck and Vanessa R. Schwartz; originated at the Musée d'Orsay, Paris
- Coded: Art Enters the Computer Age, 1952–1982 (2023), surveying the history of computer-generated art from the 1950s to the personal computer era

== Publications ==
=== As author or editor ===
- Stratis, Harriet K., and Britt Salvesen, eds. The Broad Spectrum: Studies in the Materials, Techniques, and Conservation of Color on Paper. London: Archetype Publications, 2002. ISBN 9781873132579 OCLC 59498023
- Salvesen, Britt. Harry Callahan: The Photographer at Work. Tucson; New Haven: Center for Creative Photography; Yale University Press, 2006. ISBN 9780300113327 OCLC 63908136 Foreword by John Szarkowski.
- Salvesen, Britt, and Allison Nordstrom. New Topographics. Göttingen: Steidl, 2009; revised edition 2024. ISBN 9783865218278 (2009); ISBN 9783969993408 (2024). Salvesen's essay places the original 1975 exhibition in historical context and includes interviews with the photographers.
- Viganò, Enrica, and Britt Salvesen. W. Eugene Smith: More Real Than Reality. Madrid: La Fábrica Editorial, 2011. ISBN 9788415303305 OCLC 769430405
- Barron, Stephanie, and Britt Salvesen, eds. Sharon Lockhart / Noa Eshkol. New York: DelMonico Books, 2012. ISBN 9783791352237 OCLC 780529912

=== As contributing author ===
- Druick, Douglas W., Peter Zegers, et al. (including Britt Salvesen). Van Gogh and Gauguin: The Studio of the South. Chicago; New York: Art Institute of Chicago; Thames & Hudson, 2001. ISBN 9780500510544 OCLC 47168698
- Payson, Eric. You Can't Spell America without Eric. Brooklyn, NY: powerHouse Books, 2006. ISBN 9781576873403 OCLC 69028717 Includes essay by Salvesen.
- Pauli, Lori, et al. (including Britt Salvesen). Geoffrey James: Utopia. Ottawa: National Gallery of Canada, 2008.
- Fielding, Jed. Look at Me: Photographs from Mexico City. Chicago: University of Chicago Press, 2009. ISBN 9780226248523 OCLC 236142603 Includes essay by Salvesen.
- Axsom, Richard H., ed. (including Britt Salvesen). Letters to Ellsworth. Portland, Oregon: Jordan Schnitzer Family Foundation, 2011. ISBN 9780984986408 OCLC 793494657
- Foster-Rice, Greg, and John Rohrbach, eds. Reframing the New Topographics. Chicago: Center for American Places at Columbia College Chicago, 2013. ISBN 9781935195405 OCLC 809911289 Includes essay by Salvesen, "Real Estate Opportunities: Commercial Photography as Conceptual Source in New Topographics."
- Sherry, David Benjamin. Earth Changes. London: Mörel, 2014. ISBN 9781907071423 OCLC 910251192 Includes introduction by Salvesen.
- Schott, John F. Route 66. Portland, Oregon: Nazraeli Press, 2014. ISBN 9781590053881 OCLC 900168675 Includes essay by Salvesen.
- Shore, Stephen. Transparencies: Small Camera Works 1971–1979. London: Mack, 2020. ISBN 9781912339709 OCLC 1126000131 Includes afterword by Salvesen, "Ordinary Speech: The Vernacular in Stephen Shore's Early 35mm Photography."
- Strange, Ian. Disturbed Home. Bologna: Damiani, 2022. ISBN 9788862087339 OCLC 1289262810 Includes essay by Salvesen.
- Scott, Amy, et al. (including Britt Salvesen). Out of Site: Survey Science and the Hidden West. Los Angeles: Autry Museum of the American West, 2024. ISBN 9798987929339 OCLC 1415842477
- Jones, Leslie, ed. (including Britt Salvesen). Coded: Art Enters the Computer Age, 1952–1982. Los Angeles: Los Angeles County Museum of Art, 2023. Includes essay by Salvesen on computer-generated films.
