= New topographics (photographic genre) =

Style of landscape photography

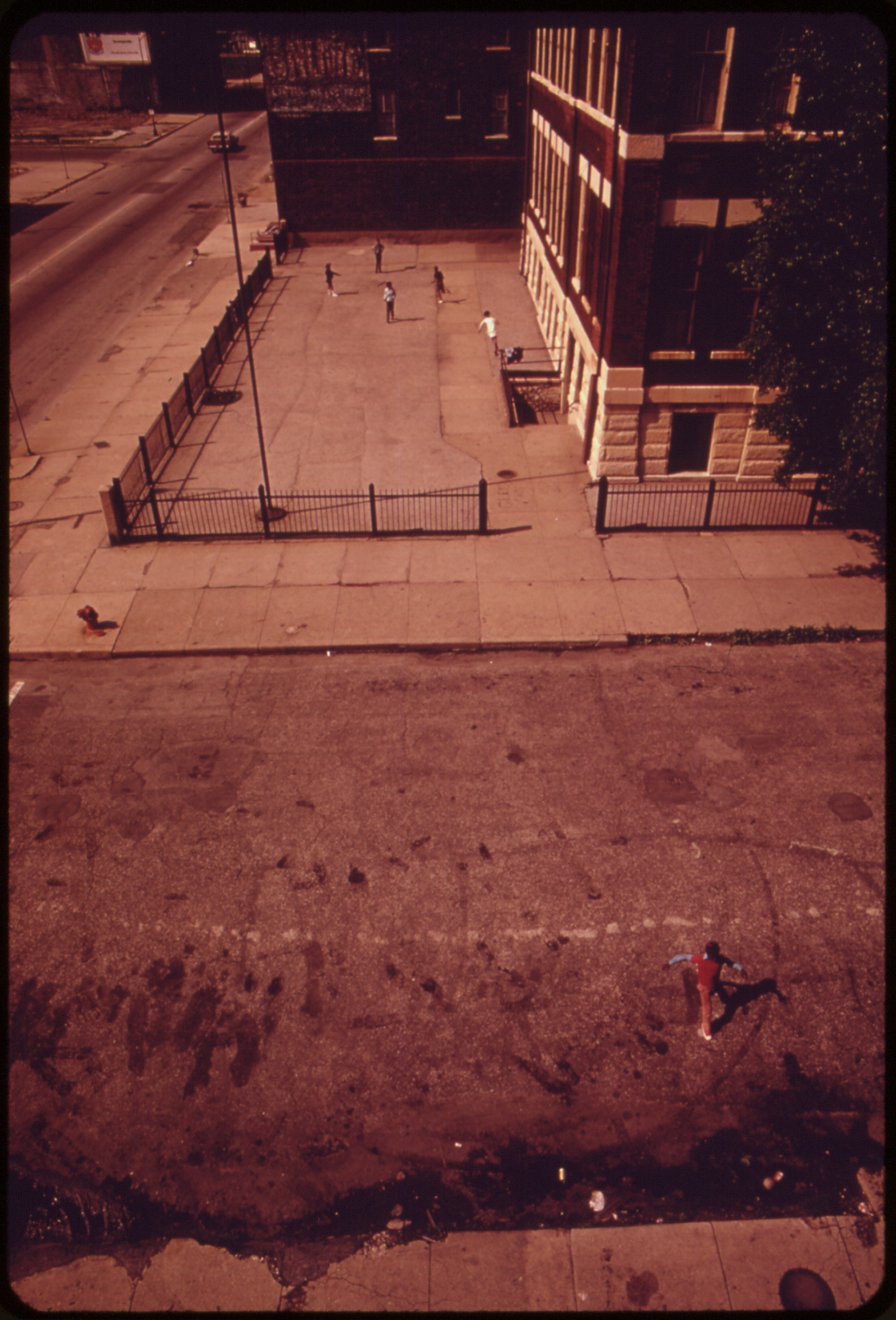
This 1973 Documerica photograph of a Chicago street scene by photojournalist Paul Sequeira displays some typical elements of the New Topographic style, such as a banal setting and detached perspective.

New Topographics is a style of urban landscape photography that emerged in the United States during the mid-1970s. The genre is characterized by a detached, straight photography approach to human-altered landscapes. Photographers in this movement reject the romantic and sublime qualities of earlier landscape photography, such as that of Ansel Adams. Instead, Robert Adams, Lewis Baltz, Bernd and Hilla Becher, Joe Deal, Frank Gohlke, Nicholas Nixon, John Schott, Stephen Shore, and Henry Wessel, focus on the commonplace, banal, and industrial features of the contemporary environment.

While the term was coined by curator William Jenkins in 1975 to characterize the photographs he selected for the exhibition New Topographics: Photographs of a Man-Altered Landscape at the George Eastman House, it has since been used to describe an ongoing photographic movement. The genre has influenced subsequent generations of photographers both in America and internationally, shaping contemporary approaches to urban, suburban, and industrial landscape photography.
