= Light Gallery =

Photography gallery in New York

- Established: 1971
- Dissolved: 1987
- Location: New York City, New York, United States
- Type: Photography gallery
- Founder: Tennyson Schad
- Director: Harold Jones (1971–1975); Peter MacGill (1979–1980); Robert Mann (1983–1987)

Light Gallery was a photography gallery in New York City that operated from 1971 to 1987. It was one of the first galleries in the United States to represent living photographers, helping to establish photography as a collectible art form.

== History ==
=== Foundation and early years (1971–1976) ===
Light Gallery was founded in 1971 by Tennyson Schad, a New York First Amendment attorney. Schad became interested in photography while serving as editorial counsel at Time Inc. during the 1960s. The gallery opened at 1018 Madison Avenue with Harold Jones, formerly an assistant curator at the George Eastman Museum, as its first director.

At the time, the Witkin Gallery (est. 1969) was the only other New York gallery devoted solely to photography, though it primarily dealt in historical works. Light Gallery focused instead on contemporary photography by living artists, many of whom were relatively unknown.

The gallery offered photographers professional representation similar to that of painters, managing technical details such as mounting and framing rather than simply taking a commission on sales. Light Gallery also made its inventory accessible through flat files that visitors could browse informally.

=== Expansion and later years (1976–1987) ===
In 1976, Light Gallery moved to 724 Fifth Avenue. After Jones left in 1975 to direct the Center for Creative Photography, the gallery was led by several directors, including Peter MacGill from 1979 to 1980.

In 1983, Schad hired Robert Mann as the gallery's final director to either liquidate the inventory or stabilize the business. Mann managed the gallery until it closed in 1987. The Schads continued to deal in photography privately until Tennyson Schad's death in 2001.

== Represented artists ==
Light Gallery represented photographers who became significant figures in 20th-century photography, including:

- Ansel Adams
- Harry Callahan
- Linda Connor
- Emmet Gowin
- Betty Hahn
- Eikoh Hosoe
- André Kertész
- Robert Mapplethorpe
- Ray K. Metzker
- Duane Michals
- Arnold Newman
- Stephen Shore
- Aaron Siskind
- Frederick Sommer
- Paul Strand
- Garry Winogrand

=== Notable exhibitions ===
The gallery presented Robert Mapplethorpe's first solo exhibition, Polaroids, in January 1973. Harold Jones also mounted the first solo exhibition of Paul Strand since the era of Alfred Stieglitz's galleries.

== Legacy ==
Light Gallery helped build a market for photography when few commercial outlets existed for the medium. The gallery trained several dealers who went on to establish their own venues, including Robert Mann (Robert Mann Gallery), Peter MacGill (Pace/MacGill Gallery), Laurence Miller (Laurence Miller Gallery), and Rick Wester.

The gallery's archives are housed at the Center for Creative Photography at the University of Arizona. In 2019, the Center organized a retrospective exhibition, "The Qualities of LIGHT," which included a documentary film and a symposium on the gallery's history.
