= Peter MacGill =

American gallerist

- Education: B.A. – Ohio Wesleyan University; M.F.A. – University of Arizona
- Occupations: Gallerist; curator; art historian
- Spouse: Susan MacGill
- Children: Mary MacGill; Gordon MacGill

Peter MacGill is an American gallerist, curator, and art historian. MacGill was President of Pace/MacGill Gallery, which opened in 1983 in New York City and was consolidated into Pace Gallery in 2019–20. MacGill has been credited with advancing photography from a niche medium to a premier collectible art form.

== Career ==
MacGill graduated with a B.A. from Ohio Wesleyan University in 1974 and an M.F.A. from the University of Arizona in 1977, becoming the first student to graduate from the university’s MFA Photography program.

He began working in the photography world as a college intern at Light Gallery in 1973, where he hung Stephen Shore’s first solo show. In 1974 he became director of the Halsted Gallery and in 1976 joined Harold Jones at the Center for Creative Photography in Tucson as a curator while teaching the history of photography.

While at LIGHT Gallery, MacGill curated the first exhibition to show original NASA Apollo mission photographs in a gallery setting, cited by The New York Times critic Gene Thornton as one of the year’s best shows. The complete set of photographs from that exhibition was later acquired by the Museum of Modern Art.

In 1983 he co-founded Pace/MacGill Gallery with Arne Glimcher of Pace Gallery and Richard Solomon of Pace Prints. The gallery mounted more than 400 exhibitions and published numerous catalogues over its 35-year history. From 1973 to 2019, MacGill mounted over 400 gallery, museum and art-fair exhibitions that represented the work of over 500 photographers. Although Pace/MacGill specialized in photography, the gallery also exhibited non-photographic work since the mid-1990s.

The gallery juxtaposed photography with other media — for example, pairing Harry Callahan’s abstract photographs with Jackson Pollock’s drawings and Lee Friedlander’s nature studies with Pierre Bonnard’s drawings. Among the gallery’s notable thematic shows were Crime Photographs (1987, The New York Times Magazine), Social Media (2011), and Curating the Flick Community (2016).

In 1999, the gallery sold Man Ray’s Glass Tears (1930–33) for $1.3 million, then a record price for a photograph. In February 2006, MacGill purchased Edward Steichen’s The Pond—Moonlight on behalf of a private collector for $2.9 million at Sotheby’s, then the highest price ever paid for a photograph.

MacGill's archive — acquired by the Getty in 2024 — includes business records, correspondence, daily calendars, exhibition files, and lecture notes spanning five decades.

He developed a model of “vertical representation,” managing not only sales and exhibitions but also publications, loans, and legal matters for artists. When Philip-Lorca diCorcia was sued for invasion of privacy over his “Heads” series, MacGill arranged legal representation for the artist during the case. MacGill also collaborated with conservation scientist Paul Messier on a project to develop improved methods of materials analysis and preservation for photographic works.

MacGill helped build major institutional photography collections through transactions including the Thomas Walther Collection for MoMA (2001), the Manfred Heiting Collection for the Museum of Fine Arts Houston (2002), and the placement of archives or works by Robert Frank, Irving Penn, Charles Sheeler, Duane Michals, Paul Strand, and David Goldblatt into U.S. museums.

In 2006, he was the first recipient of the Harold Jones Distinguished Alumni Award at the University of Arizona.

Pace/MacGill was consolidated into Pace Gallery in 2019–20, closing after 36 years of operation. MacGill continues to advise artists’ foundations and collectors and is collaborating with RadicalMedia to develop a streaming series about the history of photography.

== Board memberships and affiliations ==
MacGill serves as a trustee of the Gillman Gonzalez-Falla Fine Arts Trust and as a board member of the Peter Hujar Foundation. He also sits on the Black Mountain College Museum + Arts Center Board of Directors. MacGill further acts as an advisor to several artists’ foundations.

== Publications ==
=== Publications by MacGill ===
- Irving Penn: New and Unseen. New York: Pace/MacGill Gallery, 1999. ISBN 9781878283870.
- Irving Penn: Archaeology. New York: Pace/MacGill Gallery, 2012. ISBN 9780615399874.
- Irving Penn: Vessels. New York: Pace/MacGill Gallery, 2008. ISBN 9781930743847.
- Irving Penn: Fringes. New York: Pace Wildenstein MacGill Gallery, 1996. ISBN 9781878283627.
- Irving Penn: Other Ways of Being – 100 Photographs 1948–1971. New York: Pace/MacGill Gallery, 1990.
- Irving Penn: Cranium Architecture. New York: Pace/MacGill Gallery, 1988.
- Paul Strand: Exhibition Prints from 291. New York: Pace/MacGill Gallery, 1984.
- Photographs & Drawings – Lee Friedlander, Pierre Bonnard. Göttingen: Steidl, 2015. ISBN 9783958290884. Exhibition catalogue, Pace/MacGill Gallery, New York, September 10 – October 24, 2015.
- Harry Callahan and Jackson Pollock: Early Photographs and Drawings. New York: Pace/MacGill Gallery, 2011.
- Irving Penn: Platinum Test Materials. New York: Pace/MacGill Gallery, 2005.

=== Publications with contributions by MacGill ===
- Rodchenko. Göttingen: Steidl, 2012. ISBN 9783869302454.
- Irving Penn: Paintings. New York: Apparition, 2018. ISBN 9780692140079.
- Irving Penn: Small Trades. Los Angeles: J. Paul Getty Museum, 2009. ISBN 0892369965.
- Irving Penn: Platinum Prints. Washington, D.C.: National Gallery of Art / Yale University Press, 2005. ISBN 0300109067.
- Harry Callahan: Color, 1941–1980. Providence: Matrix Publications, 1980. ISBN 9780936554006.
- Robert Frank: Black White and Things. Washington: National Gallery of Art; Zürich: Scalo, 1994. ISBN 0894681923.
- Robert Frank: Story Lines. Göttingen: Steidl, 2004. ISBN 3865210414.
- Robert Frank: Moving Out. Washington, D.C.: National Gallery of Art, 1994.

== Artists represented ==
Richard Avedon; Harry Callahan; Yto Barrada; Richard Benson; William Christenberry; David Byrne; Chuck Close; Robert Frank; Jim Goldberg; David Goldblatt; Emmet Gowin; Paul Graham; Hai Bo	Peter Hujar; Josef Koudelka; Richard Learoyd; Richard Misrach; Yoshitomo Nara; Irving Penn; Robert Rauschenberg; Paolo Roversi; Michal Rovner; Lucas Samaras; Kiki Smith; JoAnn Verburg; Henry Wessel Jr.

== Awards ==
- 2005: Ranked 15th on American Photo magazine’s list of “The 100 Most Important People in Photography.”
- 2006: Harold Jones Distinguished Alumni Award at the University of Arizona.
