= New Topographics (exhibition) =

Landscape photography exhibition held in New York

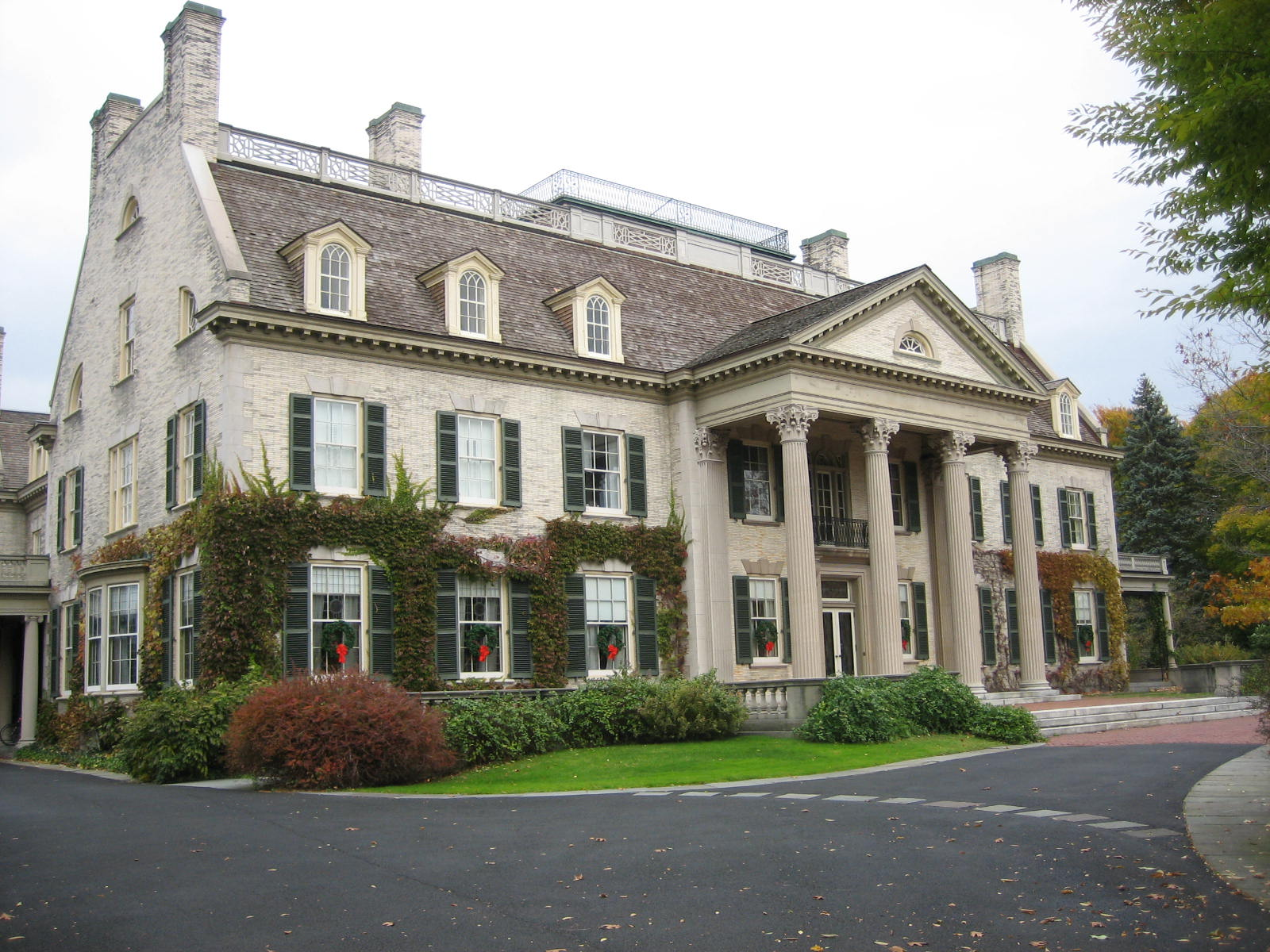
George Eastman House, Rochester, New York, where the exhibition was held in 1975 and 1976

"New Topographics: Photographs of a Man-Altered Landscape" was a groundbreaking exhibition of landscape photography, held from October 1975 to February 1976 at the International Museum of Photography at the George Eastman House in Rochester, New York. The show, curated by William Jenkins, had a lasting impact on aesthetic and conceptual approaches to American landscape photography helping to define the New Topographics genre. The exhibition brought together the work of ten photographers who photographed the post-war American landscape, both built and natural. The subjects included parking lots, suburban homes, and coal mines, usually without people. Jenkins described the images as "neutral" in style, "reduced to an essentially topographic state, conveying substantial amounts of visual information but eschewing entirely the aspects of beauty, emotion, and opinion". Regarded by scholars as one of the most important photography exhibitions of the twentieth century, it was restaged in its entirety as a traveling exhibition across the United States and Europe, beginning in 2009.

== Influences ==
Jenkins drew directly on the work of Edward Ruscha, whose self-published artist books of the 1960s (26 Gasoline Stations (1962), Various Small Fires (1964), 34 Parking Lots (1967), and others) he admired for their deadpan, styleless treatment of mundane American subjects; Jenkins took the exhibition's title and its disengaged attitude from this example, although Ruscha himself was not included in the show. The exhibition's photographers also cited Eugène Atget and Walker Evans as influences, both of whom had recorded the built, vernacular landscape, Atget in turn-of-the-century Paris and Evans in Depression-era America.

The choice of the word "topography" also linked the show to nineteenth-century American survey photographers such as Timothy O'Sullivan and William Henry Jackson, who had documented the federal expeditions then opening the West.

== Concept ==
In the catalogue introduction, Jenkins referred to the show's common thread as what he called "a problem of style", a "stylistic anonymity" that amounted to an apparent absence of style. Jenkins also presented the show as documentary rather than polemical, calling it in the catalogue a study "more anthropological than critical" that set out to record everyday lived experience as a cultural landscape shaped above all by commercial interests. In 2010, the art historian Greg Foster-Rice linked the exhibition to the serial and conceptual art of the 1960s and 1970s, pointing to Jenkins's hanging of the prints in identical frames and grids.

== The exhibition ==
=== The photographers ===
For "New Topographics", William Jenkins chose eight young American photographers, Robert Adams, Lewis Baltz, Joe Deal, Frank Gohlke, Nicholas Nixon, John Schott, Henry Wessel, Jr., and Stephen Shore, together with the German couple Bernd and Hilla Becher. Jenkins organized the show in consultation with Deal, the museum's exhibitions manager.

The Americans' subjects ranged across the everyday built environment of the United States. Robert Adams photographed tract houses spreading across suburban Colorado, Lewis Baltz the new industrial parks of Southern California, John Schott the motels along Route 66, and Nicholas Nixon the buildings of downtown Boston. Frank Gohlke photographed grain elevators and their connection to the surrounding landscape, Joe Deal the suburban development spreading around Albuquerque, and Henry Wessel the everyday scenes of the American West, while Stephen Shore recorded ordinary American street scenes and was the only photographer to work in color.

The Bechers, the show's only non-American participants, had photographed disused industrial structures across Europe and America from the late 1950s onward. They presented the images in series they called "typologies", often arranged in grids under the heading "Anonymous Sculptures", a method that conceptual artists took up. They came to the show from a distinct German tradition: their objective, typological style drew on the 1920s New Objectivity (Neue Sachlichkeit) movement, an unsentimental realism that rejected romantic idealism, exemplified for them by August Sander and Albert Renger-Patzsch.

=== Works and format ===
The exhibition comprised 168 photographs. All but Stephen Shore worked in black and white; his color photographs, the only color in the show, marked a break from the established belief that fine art photography belonged in black and white. About half the photographers used large-format 8 in × 10 in (20 cm × 25 cm) view cameras, with prints of roughly 20 cm × 25 cm (8 in × 10 in). Deal and Gohlke worked in square medium format, printing at 32 cm × 32 cm and 24 cm × 24 cm, while Baltz and Wessel used 35 mm, Baltz with Technical Pan, a slow, fine-grained Kodak film that he enlarged onto 8 in × 10 in paper. The Bechers printed larger, at the 30 cm × 40 cm then typical in Europe.

== Reception ==
When "New Topographics" opened in 1975 it drew a lukewarm and divided response. Many viewers found its deadpan pictures of parking lots, tract housing, and industrial sheds dull or anticlimactic, reacting against the absence of the beauty and craft they associated with earlier landscape photography. Several of the participating photographers were uncomfortable with the "New Topographics" label, and Jenkins's description of the work as "neutral" and without style was contested by critics who saw implicit social and political meaning in the images. The photographer Frank Gohlke, one of the participants, later described the exhibition as "a vigorously hated show".

== Legacy ==
The exhibition's standing as a turning point emerged gradually. In 1990, the critic Andy Grundberg described the work of Richard Misrach and Ray Mortenson as following the objective, descriptive approach of the New Topographics photographers. The Canadian photographer Edward Burtynsky, has also been described as working in a style derived from New Topographics. Andreas Gursky, who studied under the Bechers, has been described as carrying the influence of the New Topographics photographers into his own work, and his color work drew on that of one of the exhibition's photographers, Stephen Shore.

Most of the photographers had studied in university programs, and many taught in them. This continued a tradition begun a generation earlier by Ansel Adams and Minor White, who brought photography into higher education and helped move it from a craft to a fine art.

The Bechers, the show's only non-American participants, had photographed disused industrial structures across Europe and America from the late 1950s onward. They presented the images in series they called "typologies", often arranged in grids under the heading "Anonymous Sculptures", a method followed by conceptual artists. They came to the show from a distinct German tradition: their objective, typological style drew on the 1920s New Objectivity (Neue Sachlichkeit) movement, an unsentimental realism that rejected romantic idealism, exemplified for them by August Sander and Albert Renger-Patzsch.

=== Later presentations ===
The exhibition was recreated in various locations: in 1981, six years after its original presentation, it was shown in reduced form at the Arnolfini Gallery, Bristol, UK, organized by Paul Graham and Jem Southam. A large scale restaging of the exhibition was organized in 2009 at the Center for Creative Photography in Tucson. "New Topographics" began an international tour in 2009, with stagings at the George Eastman House in Rochester, New York, and the Los Angeles County Museum of Art. The San Francisco Museum of Modern Art presented the exhibition from July to October 2010. In 2011 the exhibition was on view at the Nederlands Fotomuseum in Rotterdam, Netherlands, and later at the Bilbao Fine Arts Museum in Spain.
