= Ray Mortenson =

American photographer (born 1944)

Ray Mortenson (born 1944) is a New York-based landscape photographer who has documented the metropolitan corridor of the US' northeastern landscape since the 1970s. From 1979-84, he made black and white photographs of the industrial tidal marshes in the New Jersey Meadowlands and abandoned buildings in The Bronx. Mortenson's work has been widely exhibited since the 1980s and is held in the permanent collections of over forty institutions in the US, Canada, France and Japan.

In addition to his book Meadowland, published in 1983 by Lustrum Press, Mortenson has produced many one of a kind hand-bound books from his photographic prints.

== Life and career ==
Ray Mortenson was born in Wilmington, DE. He attended Carnegie Institute of Technology, Pittsburgh, PA (Department of Painting, Design & Sculpture, 1963–1965) and pursued sculpture at San Francisco Art Institute, CA (1966–1968). In 1968, Mortenson moved to New York City and he continues to live and work downtown.

In 1974, he began working in photography and is self-taught. He started to exhibit his work in the early 1980s and has since participated in exhibitions in Austria, Canada and throughout the United States. His work is held in more than forty institutional collections in the US, Canada, France and Japan.

== Work ==
Ray Mortenson uses a wide variety of camera formats, photographic processes, and print sizes.

In the early 1980s, he made black and white photographs of the industrial tidal marshes in the New Jersey Meadowlands and abandoned buildings in The Bronx. Studying isolated areas bordering urban centers, he has documented particular features of locations in Rhode Island, New York, New Jersey, and Delaware.

A skilled darkroom (analog) printer, Mortenson produces photographs in sizes ranging from intimately scaled contact prints to 1:1 multi-paneled mural sized pieces. He prints both silver (including ferrotyped) and platinum.

Mortenson's major projects include: Meadowland (1978–1983), South Bronx (1982–1984), Northeast Landscape (1990–1998), Conanicut, Rhode Island (1998–2005), Meadowland Journal (2000–2010), and New York City (2008–2021). Within each project are smaller categories.

== Publications ==
- Meadowland: Photographs of New Jersey. New York: Lustrum, 1984. ISBN 0-912810-40-8. With an afterword by Jonathan Williams.
- Sobieszek, Robert A. The New American Pastoral: Landscape Photography in the Age of Questioning. Whitney Museum of American Art, New York, 1990.
- Corcoran, Sean. Broken Glass: Photographs of the South Bronx, 1982-1984, Museum of the City of New York, New York.
- L’Official, Peter. Urban Legends: The South Bronx in Representation and Ruin, Harvard University Press, Cambridge, MA: 2020

== Exhibitions ==
- The Real Big Picture, Queens Museum of Art, Flushing, NY, 1986
- Interiors, Everson Museum of Art, Syracuse, NY, 1986
- This is Not a Photograph, Ringling Museum of Art, Sarasota, FL, 1987
- The New Pastoral, Whitney Museum of American Art, Equitable Building, New York, NY, 1990
- Weeds as part of Badlands: Ray Mortenson, Jaclyn Shoub and Susan Dobson, The Confederation Centre for the Arts, Prince Edward Island, Canada, 2002
- The Land Through a Lens, Smithsonian American Art Museum, Washington, DC, 2003
- Broken Glass, Museum of the City of New York, New York, NY, 2008
- Books in DIY: Photographers & Books, Cleveland Museum of Art, Cleveland, OH, 2012
- All That Glitters is Not Gold, Center for Creative Photography, Tucson, AZ, 2014
- Analog Culture: Printer’s Proofs from the Schneider/Erdman Photography Lab, 1981- 2001, Harvard Art Museums, Cambridge, MA, 2018
- The Human Environment, Art Institute of Chicago, Chicago, IL, 2021

== Collections ==
Mortenson's work is held in the following permanent collections:

- Addison Gallery of American Art
- Art Institute of Chicago
- Bibliothèque nationale, Paris, France
- Canadian Centre for Architecture
- Center for Creative Photography, Arizona
- Cleveland Museum of Art
- Fogg Art Museum, Harvard University Art Museums, Cambridge, MA
- George Eastman Museum, Rochester, NY
- High Museum of Art, Atlanta, GA
- Los Angeles County Museum of Art, Los Angeles, CA
- Metropolitan Museum of Art, New York
- Minneapolis Institute of Art, Minneapolis, Minnesota
- Museum of the City of New York, New York, NY
- Museum of Fine Arts, Houston, Houston, TX
- Museum of Modern Art, New York, NY (Library Collection)
- The John and Mable Ringling Museum of Art, Sarasota, FL
