= Frank Gohlke =

American landscape photographer (born 1942)

- Born: April 3, 1942 (age 84); Wichita Falls, TX
- Education: University of Texas at Austin, Yale University
- Known for: Photography
- Spouse: Elise Paradis Gohlke

Frank Gohlke (born April 3, 1942) is an American landscape photographer. He has been awarded two Guggenheim fellowships, two fellowships from the National Endowment for the Arts, and a Fulbright Scholar Grant. His work is included in numerous permanent collections, including those of Museum of Modern Art, New York; the Metropolitan Museum of Art; and the Art Institute of Chicago.

Gohlke was one of ten photographers selected to be part of "New Topographics: Photographs of a Man-Altered Landscape," the landmark 1975 exhibition at the International Museum of Photography at George Eastman House (now the George Eastman Museum).

During a career spanning nearly five decades, Gohlke has photographed grain elevators in the American midwest; the aftermath of a 1979 tornado in his hometown of Wichita Falls, Texas; changes in the land around Mount St. Helens during the decade following its 1980 eruption; agriculture in central France; and the wild apple forests of Kazakhstan.

== Early life ==
Frank Gohlke was raised in Wichita Falls, Texas. He bought his first camera as a teenager and was a member of the Wichita Falls camera club during high school, eventually purchasing an enlarger and learning to process gelatin silver prints. His early subjects included family members and models hired by the camera club. Late in high school, Gohlke's interest in photography waned; he sold his enlarger and, save for family snapshots, stopped taking pictures altogether.

After graduating high school, Gohlke first attended Davidson College in North Carolina before transferring to the University of Texas at Austin, where he received a B.A. in English Literature in 1964. He went on to complete an M.A. in English Literature at Yale University in 1966. During a period of writer's block while at Yale, Gohlke returned to photography. He began making near-still films with a Super 8 movie camera before transitioning to 35-mm still photography. He eventually showed his work to documentary photographer and then-Yale professor Walker Evans, whose mode of seeing the American vernacular landscape would exert an enduring influence on Gohlke's work. From 1967 to 1968, after leaving Yale, Gohlke studied with the landscape photographer Paul Caponigro, making weekly visits to Caponigro's Connecticut home.

== Career ==
In 1971, Gohlke relocated to Minneapolis, and a year later, in 1972, he began his first major body of work, documenting the grain elevators of America's central plains. Over the next five years, from 1972 to 1977, the project took Gohlke from Minnesota to Kansas, Oklahoma, Texas, and New Mexico. From his early aesthetic interest in grain elevators, Gohlke became fascinated by their design, their connection to the surrounding landscape, and their function within the cities and towns they occupied. His photographic practice grew to include a research component whose relationship to the pictures themselves was one of reciprocal influence. A selection of the photographs was eventually published as Measure of Emptiness: Grain Elevators in the American Landscape (Johns Hopkins University Press, 1992), Gohlke's first monograph.

Gohlke was one of ten photographers to be included in the 1975 exhibition “New Topographics: Photographs of a Man-Altered Landscape,” organized by William Jenkins, then the assistant curator at the International Museum of Photography at George Eastman House (now the George Eastman Museum). New Topographics, which represented a burgeoning movement within landscape photography toward unvarnished consideration of the vernacular landscape, has come to be regarded as a watershed moment in the history of the medium.

On April 10, 1979, an F4 tornado struck Gohlke's hometown of Wichita Falls, Texas, killing 42 people, injuring 1,700 more, and significantly damaging an 8 mile-square swath of the city. Shortly thereafter, Gohlke returned home to photograph the wreckage left in the tornado's wake. He returned to rephotograph the same sites a year later, crafting precise reconstructions of his previous views in order to document the city's recovery.

In 1981, several months after the eruption of Mount St. Helens in Skamania County, Washington, Gohlke made his first trip there to photograph the volcano and its environs. In order to convey the enormity of the event, which devastated approximately 250 square miles, Gohlke employed a variety of approaches, including aerial and panoramic views and sequential photography (rephotography) over various periods of time. From 1981 to 1990, Gohlke made five visits to the region, in many cases returning several times to the same location to record its transformation. He authored short didactic texts to accompany the images. In 2004, the Museum of Modern Art in New York mounted “Mt. St. Helens: Photographs by Frank Gohlke,” a solo exhibition (with accompanying catalog), co-organized by Peter Galassi, Chief Curator, Department of Photography, and John Szarkowski, Director Emeritus, Department of Photography.

Gohlke has, in his work, dealt consistently with questions of human usage and perception of land. He has photographed farmland in central France (on a commission from la mission photographique de la DATAR); conducted a personal survey of a portion of the line of latitude 42˚30’ N, which bisects Massachusetts; made two series of photographs tracing the courses of the Red River in North Texas and the Sudbury River in Massachusetts; and documented the urban landscape and residential architecture of Queens, NY (conjointly with photographer Joel Sternfeld, on a commission from Queens College). A selection of Gohlke's and Sternfeld's pictures were published as Landscape as Longing (Steidl, 2015). In 2013, Gohlke received a Fulbright travel grant to travel to Kazakhstan in order to document the disappearing wild apple forests surrounding the Kazakh city of Almaty.

A mid-career retrospective of Gohlke's work was organized by the Amon Carter Museum (September 22, 2007 – January 6, 2008). The accompanying catalog, entitled Accommodating Nature: The Photographs of Frank Gohlke (Center for American Places and Amon Carter Museum, 2007), includes essays by Gohlke, Rebecca Solnit and John Rohrbach, Senior Curator of Photographs, Amon Carter Museum.

Gohlke has taught photography at Middlebury College; Colorado College; the School of the Museum of Fine Arts, Boston; the Massachusetts College of Art; and at Harvard, Princeton, and Yale Universities. In 2007, Gohlke accepted a teaching position at the University of Arizona College of Fine Arts in Tucson, Arizona, where he now lives and works. Gohlke has been a visiting artist in the photography program at Bard College.

== Exhibitions ==
=== One- and two-person exhibitions ===
- Art Institute of Chicago (with Edward Ranney), 1974
- Light Gallery, New York, NY, 1975, 1978, 1981, 1982
- Amon Carter Museum of Western Art, Ft. Worth, TX, 1975
- Grain Elevators, The Museum of Modern Art, New York, NY (MoMA) (traveled through 1980), 1978
- University Gallery, University of Massachusetts, Amherst, 1980
- Film in the Cities Gallery, St. Paul, MN, 1981, 1983, 1985, 1987
- Mt. St. Helens: Work in Progress, MoMA, New York, NY, 1983
- Daniel Wolf Gallery, New York, NY, 1983, 1986
- Landscapes from the Middle of the World: Photographs 1972-1987, Museum of Contemporary Photography, Columbia College, Chicago, IL (traveled through 1991), 1988
- Two Days in Louisiana, (with Gregory Conniff), Milwaukee Art Museum, Milwaukee, WI, 1989
- Franklin Parrasch Gallery, New York, 1992
- Living Water: Photographs of the Sudbury River by Frank Gohlke, DeCordova Museum and Sculpture Park, Lincoln, Massachusetts, 1993
- Mt. St. Helens as a Public Landscape, Gallery of the School of Architecture and Allied Arts, University of Oregon, Eugene, OR, 1993
- pArts Gallery, Minneapolis, MN (Sudbury River), 1994
- Florida International University, Miami (Mt. St. Helens), 1994
- Conversations in the Park, Reggio Emilia, Italy, 1995
- On Edge: Landscapes 1972-1990, Bonni Benrubi Gallery, New York, 1995
- Blue Sky Gallery, Portland, Oregon (Sudbury River), 1997
- Making Waves: The Sudbury River, New England Science Center, Worcester, Massachusetts, 1997
- The Intimate and the Infinite: Waterscapes by Frank Gohlke and Stuart Klipper, Dorsky Gallery, New York, 1999
- Howard Greenberg Gallery, New York, 2005
- Mount St. Helens, Photographs by Frank Gohlke, Museum of Modern Art, New York, 2005

=== Group exhibitions ===
- New Topographics, International Museum of Photography at George Eastman House, Rochester, NY, 1975
- Mirrors and Windows: American Photography Since 1960, MoMA (see Bibliography), 1978
- Photographers of the 70's, Art Institute of Chicago, 1979
- American Photographers, traveling exhibition sponsored by the Bell System (catalogue), 1979-1980
- American Landscapes, MoMA (catalogue), 1981
- Photography: A Sense of Order, Institute of Contemporary Art, University of Pennsylvania, Philadelphia, PA, 1981
- An Open Land: Photographs of the Midwest 1852-1982, Art Institute of Chicago (traveling exhibition with catalogue), 1983
- Paris-New York-Tokyo, Tsukuba Museum of Photography, Tsukuba, Japan; Miyagi Museum of Art, Japan (catalogue), 1985
- Variance, MoMA, New York, 1985-1986
- American Dreams, Centro de Arte Reina Sofia, Madrid, Spain (catalogue), 1987
- The Second Israeli Photography Biennial, Mishkan Le'Omanut, Museum of Art, Ein Harod, Israel (catalogue), 1988
- Tradition and Change: Contemporary American Landscape Photography, Houston Center for Photography, Houston, TX, 1988
- Photography Now, The Victoria and Albert Museum, London, England, 1989
- Photography Until Now, MoMA, New York, 1989
- More Than One Photography, MoMA, New York, 1992
- Contemporary American Photography, Jingshan Tushuguan, Guangzhou, China, 1993
- Dialogues with Photography: The Monson Collection, The Henry Art Gallery, University of Washington, Seattle, 1994
- Recent Acquisitions, The National Museum of American Art, Washington, D.C., 1994
- From Icon to Irony: German and American Industrial Photography, Boston University Art Gallery, Boston, 1995
- Expanded Visions: the Panoramic Photograph, Addison Gallery of American Art, Andover, Massachusetts, 1998
- Pictures of Europe, DeCordova Museum and Sculpture Park, Lincoln, Massachusetts, 1999
- Photographers, Writers, and the American Scene, Museum of Photographic Arts, San Diego, 2002
- A City Seen: Photographs from The George Gund Foundation Collection, The Cleveland Museum of Art, 2002
  - Six from the Seventies, Howard Greenberg Gallery, New York, 2004
  - Selektion # 1, Arbeiten in Schwarz/Weiß,* Galerie f5.6, Munich, Germany, 2006

== Commissions ==
- The County Courthouse in America, Joseph E. Seagram's & Sons, Inc., Bicentennial Project (book), 1975–1976.
- American Images, Bell System American Photography (book), 1978.
- 16 photographic murals for Tulsa International Airport, 1980–81.
- Contemporary Texas: A Photographic Portrait, Texas Historical Foundation (book), 1984.
- Photographs for the Mission Photographique de la DATAR, a French government-sponsored agency photographically documenting the French landscape (see Bibliography), 1986–1987
- Installed 6 new murals at Tulsa International Airport, 1988.
- Linea di Confine della Provincia di Reggio Emilia: Laboratorio di Fotografia 7. Commission from the Province of Reggio Emilia to photograph in the "Parco del Gigante". (Exhibition and catalogue in 1995.) 1994.
- Bahnhof Ost Basel: Art and Architecture. A commission to collaborate with the architects of a new office complex in Basel, Switzerland, on the design of an interior skylit courtyard. (Unbuilt), 1995–1996.
- George Gund Foundation Annual Report. A commission to Create a body of work on the Lake Erie shoreline. 1997–1998.
- Venezia–Marghera. A commission from the City of Venice to contribute to a project on the transformation of Marghera, the industrial port of Venice. (Book published in 1999–2000.) 1998–1999.
- National Millennium Survey, The College of Santa Fe, New Mexico, 1999–2000.
- Landscapes of Longing: Queens in the 21st Century. Collaboration with Joel Sternfeld. A commission from Queens College, New York to create a permanent installation of photographs of Queens for Powdermaker Hall, center of the Social Sciences Division. 9 photomurals and 20 small prints each. 2003–2004.
- Commission from Vassar College to create a series of photographs of campus trees. 2006.

== Videos ==
- "Prairie Castles," 1/2 hour special for KTCA, Twin Cities Public Television. Produced by Mark Lowry, written and directed by Gohlke and Lowry. 1980

== Awards ==
- 1975: Guggenheim Fellowship from the John Simon Guggenheim Memorial Foundation
- 1977: Photographer's Fellowship, National Endowment for the Arts
- 1979: Artist's Fellowship from the Bush Foundation
- 1983: Film in the Cities Photography Fellowship from the McKnight Foundation
- 1984: Guggenheim Fellowship from the John Simon Guggenheim Memorial Foundation
- 1986: Photographer's Fellowship, National Endowment for the Arts
- 1999: National Millennium Survey

== Collections ==
Gohlke's work is held in the following public collections:

- Museum of Modern Art, New York
- Art Institute of Chicago
- National Gallery of Australia, Canberra
- Bibliothèque nationale de France, Paris
- Victoria and Albert Museum, London
- National Gallery of Canada, Ottawa
- Walker Art Center, Minneapolis
- Cleveland Museum of Art
- Metropolitan Museum of Art, New York
- Smithsonian American Art Museum, Washington
- Amon Carter Museum of American Art, Fort Worth
- George Eastman House, Rochester
