= Lewis Baltz =

American photographer (1945–2014)

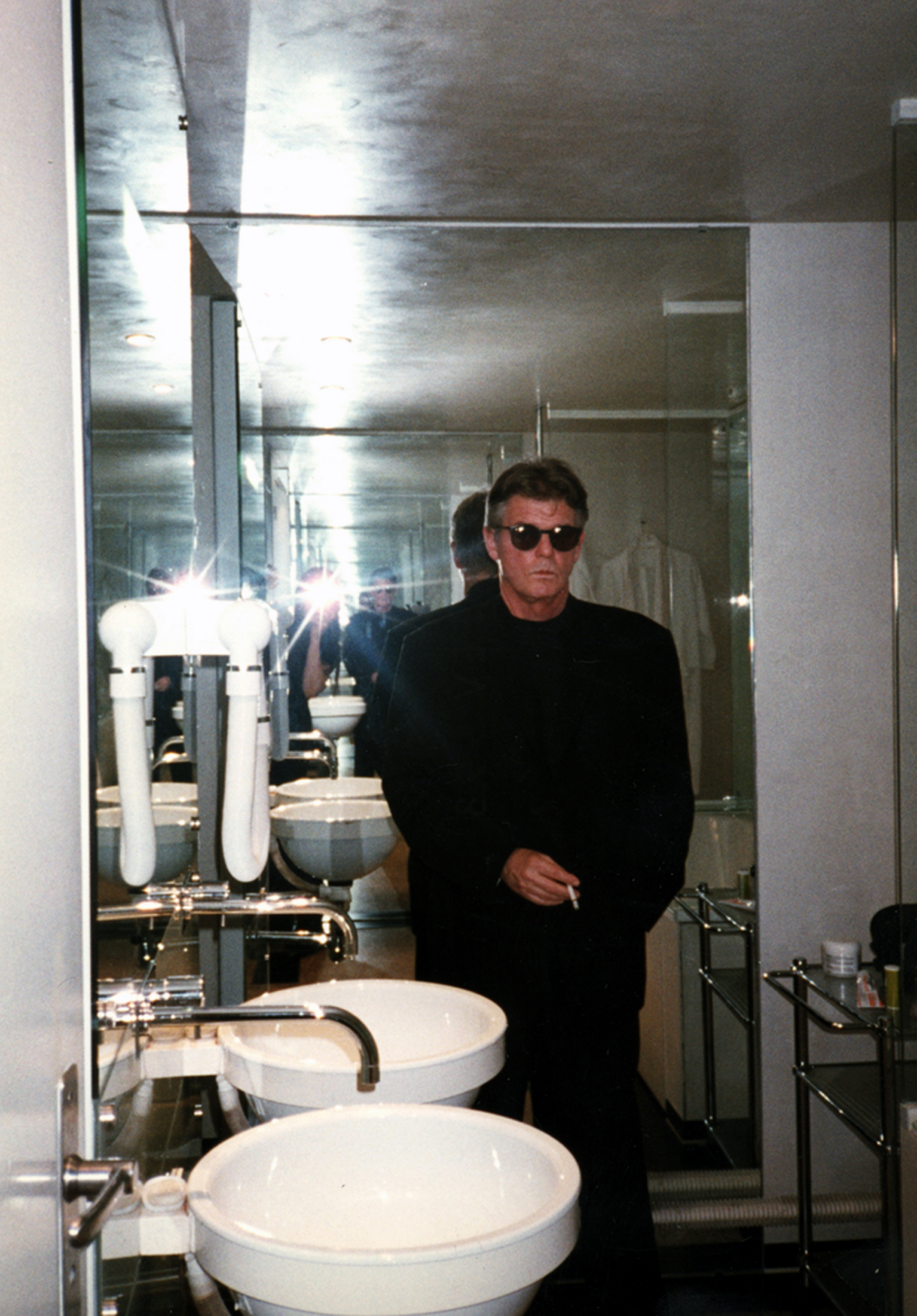
- Lewis Baltz (1998) in Jean Nouvel's Amat hotel
- Born: September 12, 1945; Newport Beach, California, U.S.
- Died: November 22, 2014 (aged 69); Paris, France
- Education: San Francisco Art Institute; Claremont Graduate School
- Occupations: Visual artist, photographer, educator
- Known for: New Topography

Lewis "Duke" Baltz (September 12, 1945 – November 22, 2014) was an American visual artist, photographer, and educator. He was an important figure in the New topographics movement of the late 1970s and was one of the photographers featured in the seminal New Topographics exhibition at the Eastman House. His best known work was monochrome photography of suburban landscapes and industrial parks which highlighted his commentary of void within the "American Dream".

He wrote for many journals, and contributed regularly to L'Architecture d'Aujourd'hui.

Baltz's work is held in the collections of the Solomon R. Guggenheim Museum, Metropolitan Museum of Art, Tate Modern, Los Angeles County Museum of Art, Whitney Museum of American Art, Art Institute of Chicago, Museum of Contemporary Art San Diego, Philadelphia Museum of Art, Museum of Contemporary Art, Los Angeles (MOCA) and San Francisco Museum of Modern Art.

== Early life and education ==
Lewis Baltz was born on September 12, 1945, in Newport Beach, California. His father died when he was age 11.

Baltz attended Monterey Peninsula College in 1967. He later graduated with a BFA degree in fine arts from San Francisco Art Institute in 1969; and held a Master of Fine Arts degree from Claremont Graduate School (now Claremont Graduate University).

== Career ==
His work is focused on searching for beauty in desolation and destruction. Baltz's images describe the architecture of the human landscape: offices, factories and parking lots. His pictures are the reflection of control, power, and influenced by and over human beings. His minimalistic photographs in the trilogy Ronde de Nuit, Docile Bodies, and Politics of Bacteria, picture the void of the other. In 1974 he captured the anonymity and the relationships between inhabitation, settlement and anonymity in The New Industrial Parks near Irvine, California.

His books and exhibitions, his "topographic work", such as The New Industrial Parks, Nevada, San Quentin Point, Candlestick Point, expose the crisis of technology and define both objectivity and the role of the artist in photographs. His work Candlestick Point is made of 84 photographs documenting a public space near Candlestick Park, ruined by natural detritus and human intervention.

Baltz moved to Europe in the late 1980s and started to use large colored prints.

He published several books of his work including Geschichten von Verlangen und Macht, with Slavica Perkovic (Scalo, 1986). Other photographic series, including Sites of Technology (1989–92), depict the clinical, pristine interiors of hi-tech industries and government research centres, principally in France and Japan. In 1995, the story Deaths in Newport was produced as a book and CD-ROM. Baltz also produced a number of video works.

Baltz taught at various institutions, including Claremont Graduate School, California Institute of the Arts (CalArts), University of California, Riverside (UC Riverside), California State University, San Bernardino, and the IUAV University in Venice, Italy, where in 2006 he co-founded the Arsenale Institute for Politics of Representation.

== End of life, death and legacy ==
In 2002, Baltz became a professor for photography at the European Graduate School in Saas-Fee, Switzerland. He lived his last years between Paris and Venice. Baltz died on November 22, 2014, in Paris at the age of 69 following a long illness.

== Awards ==
He received several scholarships and awards including a scholarship from the National Endowment For the Arts (1973, 1977), the John Simon Guggenheim Memorial Fellowship (1977), US-UK Bicentennial Exchange Fellowship (1980), and Charles Brett Memorial Award (1991).

== Publications ==
- Landscape: Theory, Lewis Baltz, Harry Callahan, Eliot Porter, Carol Digrappa and Robert Adams, 1980 ISBN 0-912810-27-0
- The New Industrial Parks Near Irvine, California, Lewis Baltz and Adam Weinburg, 2001 ISBN 0-9630785-6-9
- The Deaths in Newport, onestar press, 2002
- The Tract Houses: Die Siedlungshauser (English and German Edition), Lewis Baltz, 2005 ISBN 0-9703860-4-4
- The Prototype Works, Lewis Baltz, 2010 ISBN 3-86521-763-X
- Mario Pfeifer: Reconsidering The new Industrial Parks near Irvine, California by Lewis Baltz, 1974, Lewis Baltz, Mario Pfeifer, Vanessa Joan Mueller, 2011 ISBN 1-934105-29-5
- Lewis Baltz: Candlestick Point, Lewis Baltz, 2011 ISBN 3-86930-109-0
- Lewis Baltz: Rule Without Exception / Only Exceptions, Lewis Baltz, 2012 ISBN 3-86930-110-4
- Lewis Baltz: Texts., Lewis Baltz, 2012 ISBN 3-86930-436-7
- Lewis Baltz, Lewis Baltz, 2017 ISBN 3-95829-279-8

== Collections ==
Baltz's work is held in the following permanent collections:

- Solomon R. Guggenheim Museum
- Metropolitan Museum of Art
- Tate Modern
- Los Angeles County Museum of Art
- Whitney Museum of American Art
- Art Institute of Chicago
- Museum of Contemporary Art San Diego
- Philadelphia Museum of Art
- San Francisco Museum of Modern Art
- National Gallery of Art
