= Stephen Shore =

American photographer (born 1947)

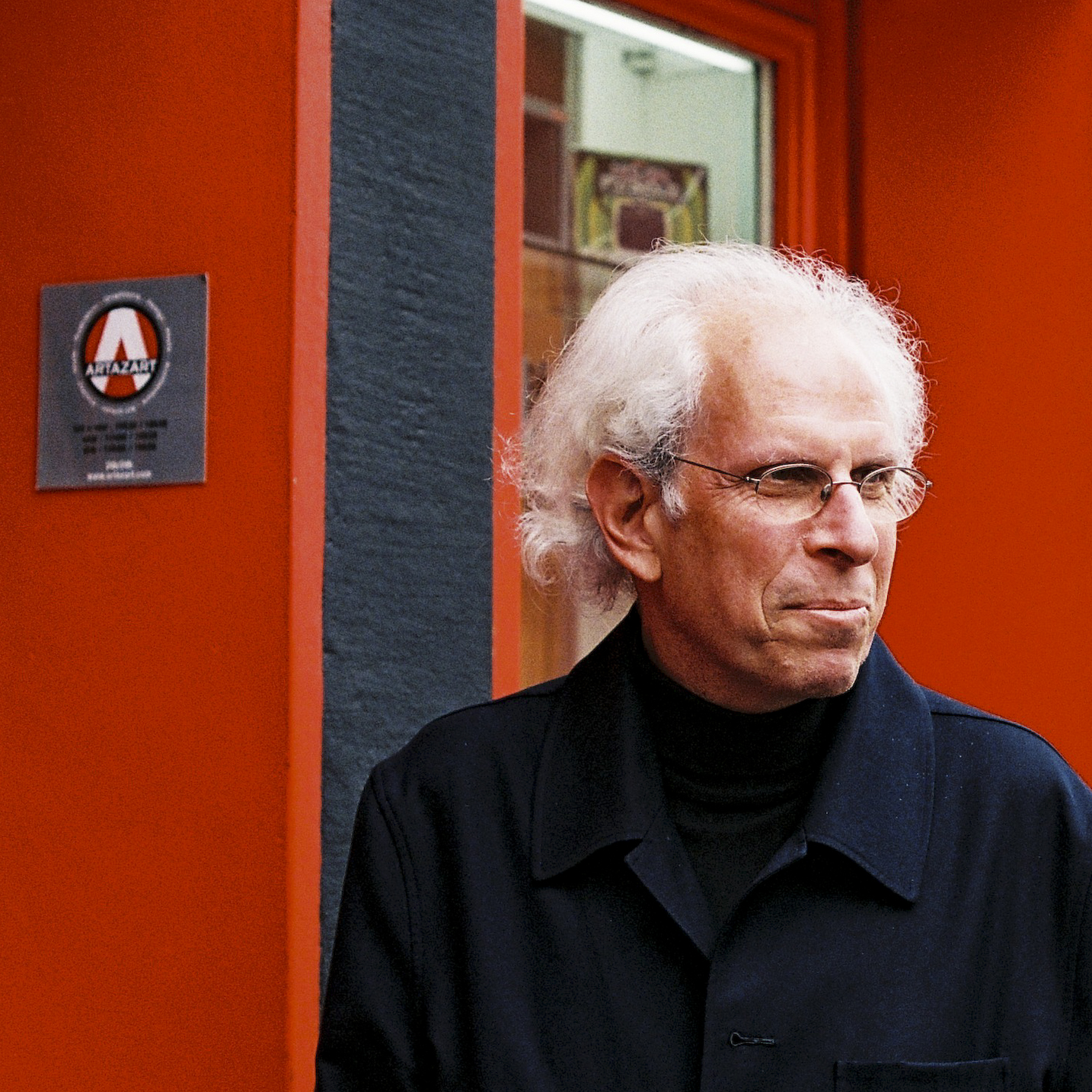
- Shore in 2010
- Born: October 8, 1947 (age 79); New York City, US
- Known for: Photography
- Website: stephenshore.net

Stephen Shore (born October 8, 1947) is an American photographer known for his images of scenes and objects of the banal, and for his pioneering use of color in art photography. His books include Uncommon Places (1982) and American Surfaces (1999), photographs that he took on cross-country road trips in the 1970s.

In 1975 Shore received a Guggenheim Fellowship. In 1971, he was the first living photographer to be exhibited at the Metropolitan Museum of Art in New York City, where he had a solo show of black and white photographs. He was selected to participate in the influential group exhibition "New Topographics: Photographs of a Man-Altered Landscape", at the International Museum of Photography at the George Eastman House (Rochester, New York), in 1975–1976 which helped to define the New Topographics genre.

In 1976 he had a solo exhibition of color photographs at the Museum of Modern Art. In 2010 he received an Honorary Fellowship from the Royal Photographic Society. Shore has been the director of the photography department at Bard College since 1982.

== Life and work ==
=== Early years ===
Shore was born as sole son of Jewish parents who ran a handbag company. He was interested in photography from an early age. Self-taught, he received a Kodak Junior darkroom set for his sixth birthday from a forward-thinking uncle. He began to use a 35 mm camera three years later and made his first color photographs. At ten he got a copy of Walker Evans's book, American Photographs, which influenced him greatly. At age fourteen, Shore naively contacted Edward Steichen, then curator of photography at the Museum of Modern Art (MoMA) in New York, if he would have a look at his photographs, and Steichen was kind enough to buy three black and white photographs of New York City.

In 1965, at the age of seventeen, Shore began to frequent Andy Warhol's studio, the Factory, photographing Warhol and the people that surrounded him, on and off, for about three years. "I began to see conceptually there because that's how Andy looked at the world, finding this detached pleasure in the banality of everyday things." His photographs of the Factory alongside those of Billy Name Kasper König selected for a documentary exhibition on Warhol at the Moderna Museet, Stockholm, in 1968.

Through John Coplans' Serial Imagery and by spending time at the John Gibson Gallery he got acquainted with conceptual works that used photography by Christo, Richard Long, Peter Hutchinson and Dennis Oppenheim. His early conceptual sequences of black and white photographs originated in 1969 and 1970. They were shown at his first solo exhibition in 1971 at the Metropolitan Museum of Art in New York City, making him the first living photographer to be exhibited there.

=== American Surfaces ===
Shore then embarked on a series of cross-country road trips, making "on the road" photographs of American and Canadian landscapes. In 1972, he made the journey from Manhattan to Amarillo, Texas, that provoked his interest in color photography. Viewing the streets and towns he passed through, he conceived the idea to photograph them in color, first using 35 mm hand-held camera and then a 4×5" view camera before finally settling on the 8×10 format. His American Surfaces series, a travel diary made between 1972 and 1973 with photographs of "friends he met, meals he ate, toilets he sat on", was not published until 1999, then again in 2005.

=== Uncommon Places ===
The change to a large format camera is believed to have happened because of a conversation with John Szarkowski. In 1974 a National Endowment for the Arts (NEA) grant funded further work, followed in 1975 by a Guggenheim Fellowship.

Along with others, especially William Eggleston, Shore is recognized as one of the leading photographers who established color photography as an art form. His book Uncommon Places (1982) was influential for new color photographers of his own and later generations. Photographers who have acknowledged his influence on their work include Nan Goldin, Andreas Gursky, Martin Parr, Joel Sternfeld and Thomas Struth.

=== Other work ===
Shore photographed fashion stories for Another Magazine, Elle, Daily Telegraph and many others.

=== Legacy ===
In 2026, more than 800 photographs from Shore's Uncommon Places series were gifted to Vancouver Art Gallery, Canada. The VAG now has one of the largest museum collections of Shore’s work in the world.

== Awards ==
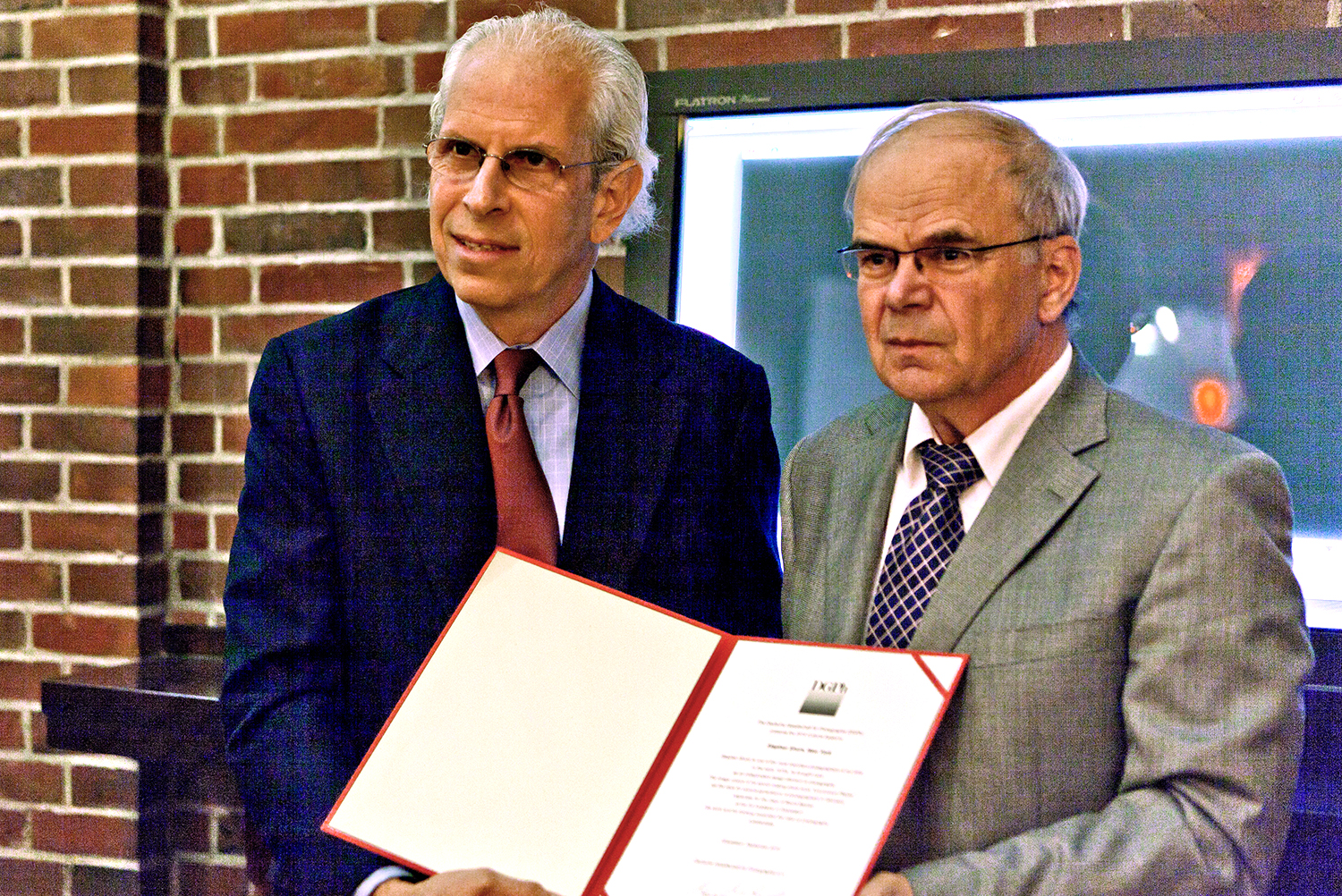
Shore receiving the German Society for Photography's Culture Award, with Prof. Dr. Nickel (Chairman of DGPh)

- 1974: National Endowment for the Arts Fellowship.
- 1975: Guggenheim Fellowship from the John Simon Guggenheim Memorial Foundation.
- 2010: Royal Photographic Society Honorary Fellowship.
- 2010: Culture Award, German Society for Photography (DGPh), Germany.

== Exhibitions ==
=== Solo exhibitions ===
- 1971: Metropolitan Museum of Art, New York City
- 1972: Light Gallery, New York City. The first exhibition of his American Surfaces photographs. Further solo shows in 1973, 1975 (stereo photographs), 1977, 1978 and 1980.
- 1976: Museum of Modern Art (MoMA), New York City
- 1977: Rencontres d'Arles, Arles, France
- 1981: Ringling Museum of Art, Sarasota, FL, subsequently at Museum of Arts and Sciences, Daytona Beach, and (1982) Polk Public Museum, Lakeland, FL
- 1981: Fraenkel Gallery, San Francisco
- 1982: ARCO Center for Visual Art, Los Angeles
- 1983: Pace/McGill Gallery, New York City (subsequent show in 1989)
- 1984: Art Institute of Chicago
- 1985: Center for Creative Photography, Tucson
- 1994: Fotografien 1973 bis 1993, Westfälischer Kunstverein, Münster, Sprengel Museum, Hannover, Württembergischer Kunstverein Stuttgart, Amerika Haus Berlin, and George Eastman House, Rochester, NY
- 1999: American Surfaces 1972, SK Stiftung Kultur, Cologne, and Fotografie Forum international, Frankfurt/Main
- 2011: Abu Dhabi, Aspen Art Museum
- 2012: Stephen Shore: Uncommon Places, Multimedia Art Museum, Moscow
- 2014: Stephen Shore: Survey, Fundación Mapfre, Madrid, subsequently at Rencontres d'Arles, Arles
- 2016: Stephen Shore. Retrospective, C/O Berlin, Berlin
- 2017–2018: Stephen Shore, Museum of Modern Art, New York City

=== Group exhibitions ===
- 1968: Andy Warhol. Photographs by Stephen Shore and Billy Name, Moderna Museet, Stockholm. Curated by Kasper König
- 1973: Landscape/Cityscape, Metropolitan Museum of Art, New York
- 1975: New Topographics, George Eastman House, Rochester
- 2009–2012: New Topographics, George Eastman House, Rochester, and Center for Creative Photography, Tucson. Further stops in Los Angeles, San Francisco, Linz (Austria), Cologne (Germany), Rotterdam (The Netherlands), and Bilbao (Spain)

== Publications ==
=== Photo books, monographs and solo exhibition catalogues ===
- Stephen Shore: Photographs. Sarasota, Fl: John and Mable Ringling Museum of Art, 1981. Interview with Stephen Shore by Michael Auping.
- Uncommon Places. New York: Aperture, 1982. ISBN 0-89381-101-7.
- The Gardens at Giverny: A View of Monet's World. New York: Metropolitan Museum of Art/Aperture, 1983 (repr. 2005). ISBN 0-89381-113-0.
- Luzzara. Museo Nazionale delle Arti Naives "Cesare Zavattini" di Luzzara. Rubiera (Reggio Emilia): Arcadia Ed., 1993. OCLC 637820760. "Companion volume" to Paul Strand's Un Paese from 1953.
- Fotografien 1973 bis 1993. Munich: Schirmer/Mosel, 1994. ISBN 3-925047-32-8 (in German). Catalogue accompanying the first retrospective exhibition which travelled through Germany, edited by Heinz Liesbrock, texts by Liesbrock, James Enyeart and Thomas Weski, and a conversation by Liesbrock with Bernd and Hilla Becher.
  - Photographs 1973–1993. Munich: Schirmer Art Books, 1998. ISBN 3-88814-647-X. English edition for the George Eastman House, Rochester, the only venue outside Germany.
- The Velvet Years. Andy Warhol's Factory, 1965–67. New York: Thunder's Mouth, 1995. ISBN 1-56025-098-4. Text by Lynne Tyllman.
- American Surfaces 1972. Munich: Schirmer/Mosel, 1999. ISBN 3-88814-423-X. Edited by Shore, sequence of 77 photographs.
- Uncommon Places: 50 Unpublished Photographs. Düsseldorf: Galerie Conrads, and Paris: Ed. Mennour, 2002. ISBN 3-928224-06-9. Text by Gerry Badger and Shore.
- Uncommon Places: The Complete Works. New York: Aperture, and London: Thames & Hudson, 2004. ISBN 978-1-59711-303-8. Updated 2nd printing in 2015 with 20 additional photographs and statement.
- American Surfaces. London: Phaidon, 2005 (reprinted 2008, 2011, 2013). ISBN 978-0-714848-63-1. Edition with 312 photographs, an introduction by Bob Nickas and captions.
  - New revised and expanded edition: 2020. ISBN 978-1-83866-137-3.
- Essex County. Portland, OR: Nazraeli Press, 2006. ISBN 1-59005-041-X.
- One Picture Book #43: Merced River, Yosemite National Park, California 8/13/79. Portland, OR: Nazraeli Press, 2007. ISBN 1-59005-203-X.
- A Road Trip Journal. London: Phaidon, 2008. ISBN 978-0-714848-01-3. Limited edition, numbered and signed.
- Stephen Shore. Dublin: Douglas Hyde Gallery, 2010. ISBN 1-905397-29-1. Text by Mark Haworth-Booth.
- Emirati Expressions. Abu Dhabi: Tourism & Culture Authority, 2011. ISBN 9948-16-293-5. Result of four months of workshops in 2009. Exhibition catalogue a. o. with a portfolio of 50 images taken by Shore in Abu Dhabi.
- Mose: A Preliminary Report. Cologne: Walther König, 2011. ISBN 978-3-86560-394-4. Edited by Antonello Frongia and William Guerrieri.
- The Book of Books. London: Phaidon 2012. ISBN 978-0-7148-6086-2. Massive two-volume set in slipcase containing all 83 of Shore's print-on-demand books made between 2003 and 2008. Limited edition of 250 signed copies. Essay by Jeff Rosenheim.
- The Hudson Valley. Annandale-on-Hudson, NY: Blind Spot Series, 2012. ISBN 0-615-49176-6. Limited edition of 1000, edited by Dana Faconti, text by Laurie Dahlberg.
- One Picture Book #73: Pet Pictures. Portland, OR: Nazraeli Press, 2012. ISBN 1-59005-356-7.
- From Galilee to the Negev. London: Phaidon, 2014. ISBN 978-0-7148-6706-9.
- Winslow Arizona. Tokyo: Amana, 2014. ISBN 978-4-907519-07-0 (English and Japanese). Series of pictures taken on a single day as part of Doug Aitken's Station to Station project.
- Stephen Shore: Survey. Madrid: Fundación Mapfre, and New York: Aperture, 2014. ISBN 978-1-59711-309-0. Catalogue accompanying the first comprehensive retrospective, with an interview between David Campany and Shore, and texts by Marta Dahó, Sandra S. Phillips and Horacio Fernández.
- Survivors in Ukraine. London: Phaidon, 2015. ISBN 978-0-7148-6950-6. Essay by Jane Kramer.
- Instagram. London: Mörel, 2015. ISBN 978-1-907071-49-2. All images posted by Shore on Instagram up to this point, edited by Hans-Ulrich Obrist. Limited edition of 200.
- with Tina Barney: The Noguchi Museum: A Portrait. London: Phaidon, 2015. ISBN 978-0-7148-7028-1.
- Factory: Andy Warhol. London: Phaidon, 2016. ISBN 978-0-7148-7274-2. Text by Lynne Tyllman.
- Luzzara, 1993. London: Stanley/Barker, 2016. ISBN 978-0-9569922-8-4. New and expanded edition.
- Stephen Shore: Selected Works, 1973–1981. New York: Aperture, 2017. ISBN 978-1-59711-388-5.
- Stereograph. New York: Aperture, 2018. ISBN 978-1-68395-106-3. Thirty stereoscopic slides in viewer. Photographs made in 1974 with a Stereo Realist.
- VOL. LXIX – Los Angeles, CA, February 4, 1969. New York: Roman Nvmerals, 2018. OCLC 1084978348.
- Elements. New York: Eakins Press Foundation, 2019. ISBN 978-0-87130-080-5.
- Transparencies: Small Camera Works 1971–1979. London: Mack, 2020. ISBN 978-1-912339-70-9. Afterword by Britt Salvesen, "Ordinary Speech: The Vernacular in Stephen Shore's Early 35mm Photography".
- Steel Town. London: Mack, 2021. ISBN 978-1-913620-06-6.
- Topographies: Aerial Surveys of the American Landscape. London: Mack, 2023. ISBN 978-1-913620-89-9. Aerial photographs shot by drone since 2020. Essays by Noah Chasin and Richard B. Woodward.
- Early Work. London: Mack, 2025. ISBN 978-1-917-65106-6. Photographs shot from 1960 to 1965 (when Shore was 12-17 years old).

=== Writings on photography ===
- The Nature of Photographs: A Primer. Baltimore, MD: Johns Hopkins University Press, 1998. ISBN 978-0-801857-20-1.
  - London: Phaidon, 2007. ISBN 978-0-7148-5904-0.
- Witness Number One. New York: Joy of Giving Something, 2006. ISBN 1-59005-188-2. Edited by Shore, conversation with Jeff Rosenheim, essay by Martin Parr: "11 Interesting Photography Books about Which Little Is Known," additional photographs by Shore's students Shannon Ebner, Jamie O'Shea and Laura Gail Tyler.
- "Form and Pressure". In: Aperture 205, winter 2011.
- Modern Instances: The Craft of Photography. A Memoir. London: Mack, 2022. ISBN 978-1-913620-53-0.

== Literature ==
- Max Kozloff: "Photography: The Coming of Age of Color." In: Artforum, January 1975. Reprinted in Max Kozloff: Photography & Fascination. Danbury, NH: Addison House 1979. ISBN 0-89169-020-4. Pp. 183–196, here 192–195.
- Sally Eauclaire: The New Color Photography. New York: Abbeville, 1981. ISBN 978-089659-196-7.

- New Color/New Work. Abbeville, 1984. ISBN 978-089659-460-9.
- American Independents: Eighteen Color Photographers. New York: Abbeville, 1987. ISBN 0-89659-666-4.

- Martin Parr, Gerry Badger: The Photobook: A History, Volume II. London: Phaidon 2006. ISBN 978-0-7148-4433-6. Uncommon Places, p. 35, American Surfaces, 294f.

- Volume III. London: Phaidon 2014. ISBN 978-0-7148-6677-2. A Road Trip Journal, p. 303.

- Britt Salvesen, Alison Nordström: New Topographics. CCP, Tucson, George Eastman House, Rochester. Göttingen: Steidl 2009. ISBN 3-86521-827-X.
- Kevin Moore: Starburst. Color Photography in America 1970–1980. Ostfildern: Hatje Cantz, 2010. ISBN 978-3-7757-2490-6. Catalogue accompanying the exhibition at Cincinnati Art Museum.
