= John Szarkowski =

American photographer, curator, historian, and critic (1925–2007)

- Born: Thaddeus John Szarkowski; December 18, 1925; Ashland, Wisconsin
- Died: July 7, 2007 (aged 81); Pittsfield, Massachusetts
- Known for: Photography curator

Thaddeus John Szarkowski (December 18, 1925 – July 7, 2007) was an American photographer, curator, historian, and critic. From 1962 to 1991 Szarkowski was the director of photography at New York's Museum of Modern Art (MoMA).

== Early life and career ==
He was born and grew up in the small northern Wisconsin city of Ashland, and became interested in photography at age eleven. In World War II Szarkowski served in the U.S. Army, after which he graduated in 1947 in art history from the University of Wisconsin–Madison. He then began his career as a museum photographer at the Walker Art Center, Minneapolis.

At this time he was also a practicing art photographer; he had his first solo show at the Walker Art Center in 1949, the first of a number of solo exhibitions. In 1954 Szarkowski received the first of two Guggenheim Fellowships, resulting in the book The Idea of Louis Sullivan (1956). Between 1958 and 1962, he returned to rural Wisconsin. There, he undertook a second Guggenheim fellowship in 1961, researching into ideas about wilderness and the relationship between people and the land.

== Museum of Modern Art ==
New York's Museum of Modern Art appointed Szarkowski director of its department of photography, beginning July 1, 1962. Edward Steichen chose Szarkowski as his successor. In 1973 Szarkowski began service to the National Endowment for the Arts as one of its three photography panelists.

In 1973 Szarkowski published Looking at Photographs, a practical set of examples on how to write about photographs. The book is still required reading for students of photography, and argues for the importance of looking carefully and bringing to bear every bit of intelligence and understanding possessed by the viewer. Szarkowski has also published numerous books on individual photographers, including, with Maria Morris Hamburg, the definitive four-volume work on the photography of Atget.

He wrote Mirrors and Windows: American Photography Since 1960 (1978) identifying a dichotomy between strategies of pictorial expression in American photography; "It seems to this viewer that the difference between [Minor] White and [Robert] Frank relates to the difference between the goal of self-expression and the goal of exploration." Though not all photographers in the book are American (Frank was Swiss, for example), the pictures were taken and/or exhibited there. The publication is divided almost equally into Parts I (pp. 29–86) and II (pp. 87–148). His 'Mirror' analogy represents self-reflective photography, represented in the book by Jerry Uelsmann, Paul Caponigro, Ralph Gibson, Duane Michals, Judy Dater and others; while the idea of the 'Window' is found in the documentary approach, exemplified by inclusions of work by Diane Arbus, Lee Friedlander, Henry Wessel, Joel Meyerowitz, and Garry Winogrand.

He taught at Harvard, Yale, and New York University, and continued to lecture and teach. From 1983 to 1989, he was an Andrew Dickson White Professor-at-Large at Cornell University. For the 150th anniversary of the invention of photography he curated a final major exhibition before his retirement, and wrote an accompanying book: Photography Until Now. In 1990, U.S. News & World Report said: "Szarkowski's thinking, whether Americans know it or not, has become our thinking about photography".

== Retirement ==
In 1991 Szarkowski retired from his post at the MoMA and became the museum's photography director emeritus. He was succeeded by Peter Galassi, the Joel and Anne Ehrenkranz chief curator of the department of photography at The Museum of Modern Art.

In 1989 Szarkowski was awarded the International Center of Photography (ICP) award for writing about photography and in 1995 he was awarded the ICP Lifetime Achievement Award.

Szarkowski continued to write and curate exhibitions at MoMA and elsewhere, like Alfred Stieglitz at Lake George and Ansel Adams at 100. Another monograph on Atget was also published. He returned to making his own photographic work, mostly attempting to picture a spirit of place in the American landscape. In 2005 he co-curated his first retrospective of his own work with Sandra S. Phillips at the San Francisco Museum of Modern Art, subsequently exhibited at MoMA in early 2006. In retirement, Szarkowski served on the boards of several of the mutual funds sold by Dreyfus Corporation.

Szarkowski died from complications of a stroke on July 7, 2007, in Pittsfield, Massachusetts, aged 81.

== Publications of photographic works ==
- The Idea of Louis Sullivan, Minneapolis: University of Minnesota Press, 1956. ASIN B0041LVXMS.
- The Face of Minnesota, Minneapolis: University of Minnesota Press, 1958. ASIN: B0000CK4KY.
- Mr. Bristol's Barn, Harry N Abrams, 1997. ISBN 978-0810942868.
- John Szarkowski: Photographs. New York: Bulfinch, 2005. ISBN 9780821261989. Retrospective exhibition at San Francisco Museum of Modern Art, text by Sandra S. Phillips. Toured to Museum of Modern Art, New York

== Exhibitions curated by Szarkowski and accompanying publications ==
If not indicated otherwise, all books were published by the Museum of Modern Art, New York. References link to the individual webpage of the exhibition in the museum's digitized archives (MAID). The pages comprise installation views, the original press releases of each exhibition with extensive text, the text of the wall label written by Szarkowski and a complete checklist of the works displayed. The exhibition catalogues (until 1981) are oftentimes also available in digitized form. Exhibitions without accompanying catalogue are simply integrated here, as are the only books not published in conjunction with an exhibition: Looking at Photographs (1973) and the 2000 monograph on Atget.

- 1962: with Grace M. Mayer: Ernst Haas: Color Photography. (No catalogue.)
- 1963: Five Unrelated Photographers: Ken Heyman. George Krause. Jerome Liebling. Minor White, and Garry Winogrand. (No catalogue.)
- 1963: The Photographs of Jacques Henri Lartigue. OCLC 906958149 (No ISBN), ASIN B0018MX7JK.
- 1963: The Photographer and the American Landscape. OCLC 1075049455. (Reprints in 1966 and 1971.)
- 1964: André Kertész, Photographer. OCLC 48846579. Retrospective exhibition.
- 1965: The Photo Essay. (No catalogue.) Survey on magazine work.
- 1966: The Photographer's Eye. ISBN 0-87070-525-3. Exhibited in several parts since 1964.
- 1966: Dorothea Lange. (No ISBN). Retrospective exhibition. Introductory essay by George P. Elliott.
- 1967: Once Invisible. (No catalogue.)
- 1967: New Documents. (No catalogue.) Seminal exhibition featuring Diane Arbus, Lee Friedlander and Garry Winogrand.
- 1968: Henri Cartier-Bresson. (No catalogue.) "Recent Photographs [...] of the past decade [...] drawn entirely from the Museum's collection and includes a retrospective gallery of about 30 photographs from 1929 to about 1950."
- 1968: Brassaï, Photographs. Retrospective exhibition.
- 1969: Bill Brandt. "The first major one-man exhibition in the country", later touring the US and UK. Instead of a catalogue Shadow of Light, Viking, New York 1966, was offered.
- 1969/1970: Atget. (No catalogue.) Retrospective exhibition.
- 1969/1970: Garry Winogrand: The Animals. 2nd ed. 2004, ISBN 0-87070-633-0.
- 1970/1971: E.J. Bellocq: Storyville Portraits. ISBN 0-87070-250-5.
- 1970: Bruce Davidson: East 100th Street. Harvard University Press, ISBN 0-67422-436-1.
  - German/English reprint: In Focus Galerie/Locher, Cologne 1999, no ISBN.
  - expd. ed.: St. Ann's Press, Los Angeles 2003, ISBN 0-97136-813-9.
- 1971: Walker Evans. ISBN 0-87070-312-9. Retrospective exhibition.
- 1972: Atget's Trees. (No catalogue.)
- 1972/1973: Diane Arbus. The retrospective exhibition was accompanied by the Aperture monograph edited by Doon Arbus and Marvin Israel. ISBN 0-912334-40-1.
- 1973: Looking at Photographs. 100 Pictures from the Collection of The Museum of Modern Art. ISBN 0-87070-514-8. (Book only.)
- 1973: From the Picture Press. ISBN 0-87070-334-X. Survey on photo-journalism.
- 1974: with Shoji Yamagishi: New Japanese Photography. ISBN 0-87070-503-2.
- 1976: William Eggleston's Guide. ISBN 0-87070-317-X.
  - 2002: newly mastered edition. ISBN 0-87070-378-1.
- 1976: Callahan. ISBN 0-900406-83-6.
- 1978: Mirrors and Windows: American Photography since 1960. ISBN 0-87070-475-3.
- 1979: Ansel Adams and the West. Retrospective with 153 prints. Accompanying book published as Yosemite and the Range of Light, ISBN 0-87070-649-7.
- 1981: American Landscapes. ISBN 0-87070-207-6.
- 1981–1985: with Maria Morris Hambourg: The Work of Atget. Spring Industries Series on the Art of Photography. ISBN 0-87070-205-X (Four volume set). Each exhibition travelled through the US.
  - 1981: Volume 1, Old France. ISBN 0-87070-204-1.
  - 1982: Volume 2, The Art of Old Paris. ISBN 0-87070-212-2.
  - 1983: Volume 3, The Ancien Régime. ISBN 0-87070-217-3.
  - 1985: Volume 4, Modern Times. ISBN 0-87070-218-1.
- 1982: 20th Century Photographs from the Museum of Modern Art = 20世紀の写真 : ニューヨーク近代美術館コレクション展. OCLC 10474807 (English and Japanese). Exhibition at Seibu Museum of Art, Tokyo. Selection by Szarkowski and Susan Kismaric, essay by Szarkowski.
- with John Pultz: Big Pictures by Contemporary Photographers. (No catalogue.)
- 1984: Irving Penn. ISBN 0-87070-562-8.
- 1988: Winogrand: Figments from the Real World. ISBN 0-87070-640-3.
- 1989: Photography Until Now. ISBN 0-87070-573-3. Historical survey on the occasion of photography's 150th anniversary.
- 1995: Alfred Stieglitz at Lake George. ISBN 0-87070-138-X.
- 1997: with Richard Benson: A Maritime Album: 100 Photographs and Their Stories. New Haven: Yale University Press, and Newport News: The Mariners' Museum. ISBN 0-300-07342-9.
- 2000: Atget. ISBN 0-87070-094-4. (Book only.)
- 2001: with Sandra S. Phillips: Ansel Adams at 100. San Francisco Museum of Modern Art. ISBN 0-316-85862-5. Exhibition toured to the Art Institute of Chicago, the Hayward Gallery, London, Kunstbibliothek Berlin, Los Angeles County Museum of Art and MoMA, New York in 2003.

=== Writing contributions by Szarkowski ===
- Robert Adams: The New West. Landscapes along the Colorado Front Range. Boulder: Colorado Associated University Press, 1974. ISBN 0-87081-058-8.
- The Portfolios of Ansel Adams. Boston: Bulfinch, 1977. ISBN 0-8212-0723-7.
- Ansel Adams: Classic Images. Introduction by Szarkowski, essay by James Alinder. Boston: Little, Brown & Co, 1986. ISBN 0-8212-1629-5 ("The Museum Set" selected by Adams).
- Lee Friedlander, Seibu Museum of Art and the Asahi Shimbun, Tadashi Furukawa & Kosei, 1987, ISBN 4333012708 (Japanese/English).
- Sandra S. Phillips (ed.). Wright Morris: Origin of a Species. San Francisco: San Francisco Museum of Modern Art, 1992. ISBN 0-918471-24-9.
- Jan Groover: Photographs. Boston: Bulfinch, 1993. ISBN 0-8212-2006-3.
- Bellocq: Photographs from Storyville, the Red-Light District of New Orleans. New York: Random House, 1996. ISBN 0-679-44975-2.
- Still Life: Irving Penn Photographs, 1938–2000. Boston: Bulfinch, 2001. ISBN 0-8212-2702-5.
- Slide Show: The Color Photographs of Helen Levitt. New York: powerHouse Books, 2005. ISBN 1-57687-252-1.

== Documentaries about Szarkowski ==
- John Szarkowski: A Life in Photography. 48-minute documentary on his life and work, produced by Richard B. Woodward, directed by Sandy McLeod. Checkerboard Film Foundation, 1998. VHS OCLC 937316192, DVD OCLC 71000107.
  - online video: San Francisco: Kanopy Streaming, 2015. OCLC 921958520.
- Speaking of Art: John Szarkowski on Ansel Adams. 37-minute film of a slide-lecture. Checkerboard/Films Media Group, 2004. DVD OCLC 916342733.
  - online video: San Francisco: Kanopy Streaming, 2015. OCLC 1181863859.
- Speaking of Art: John Szarkowski on Eugène Atget. 45-minute film of a slide-show lecture. Checkerboard/Films Media Group, 2004. DVD OCLC 700053095.
  - online video: San Francisco: Kanopy Streaming, 2015. OCLC 1331416994.
- Speaking of Art: John Szarkowski on John Szarkowski. 60-minute film of a lecture on his own photography. Checkerboard/Films Media Group, 2005. OCLC 811356761.
  - online video: San Francisco: Kanopy Streaming, 2015. OCLC 1181863981.
