= Henry Wessel Jr. =

American photographer and educator (1942–2018)

Henry Wessel
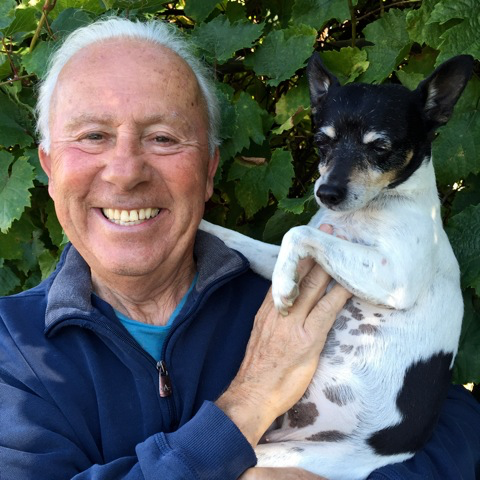
- Wessel with his dog Roxy
- Born: July 28, 1942; Teaneck, New Jersey, US
- Died: September 20, 2018 (aged 76); Bay Area, California, US
- Education: B.A. – Pennsylvania State University; M.F.A. – State University of New York at Buffalo
- Occupation: Photographer

Henry Wessel (July 28, 1942 – September 20, 2018) was an American photographer and educator. He made "obdurately spare and often wry black-and-white pictures of vernacular scenes in the American West".

Wessel produced a number of books of photography. He was the recipient of two Guggenheim Fellowships and three National Endowment for the Arts grants and his work is included in the permanent collections of major American, European, and Asian museums.

His first solo exhibition was curated by John Szarkowski at the Museum of Modern Art in New York in 1972 and he was one of ten photographers included in the influential New Topographics: Photographs of a Man-Altered Landscape exhibition at George Eastman House in 1975 which helped to define the New Topographics genre. His work has since been exhibited in solo exhibitions at Tate Modern in London, the Museum of Modern Art in New York, the Museum of Contemporary Art, Los Angeles, and the San Francisco Museum of Modern Art.

Wessel was emeritus professor of art at San Francisco Art Institute, where he taught from 1973 to 2014.

== Life and work ==
Wessel was born in Teaneck, New Jersey and raised in Ridgefield. He graduated from Pennsylvania State University in 1966, where he discovered his lifelong career interest through an encounter with a work of photographs he picked up in a book store near the campus, which led him to give up his previous interest in psychology. Throughout much of his career he used only one camera and one type of film: a Leica 35 mm camera with a 28 mm wide-angle lens and Kodak Tri-X film. His later work did incorporate color.

Wessel was emeritus professor of art at San Francisco Art Institute, where he taught from 1973 to 2014.

Sandra S. Phillips, senior curator of Photography at the San Francisco Museum of Modern Art wrote, "Wessel's remarkable work, witty, evocative and inventive, is distinctive and at the same time a component part of the great development of photography which flourished in the 1970s. The pictures continue to grow and evolve and the work is now regarded as an individual important contribution to twentieth century American photography.

Wessel died at the age of 76 in his home in Point Richmond, Richmond, California from pulmonary fibrosis on September 21, 2018.

== Publications ==
=== Publications by Wessel ===
- House Pictures. San Francisco: Fraenkel Gallery, 1992. OCLC 26864482.
- Night Walk. Santa Monica, CA: RAM Publications + Distribution, 2000. ISBN 978-0963078575.
- Henry Wessel: Rena Bransten Gallery Exhibition Catalogue San Francisco: Rena Bransten Gallery, 2000. ASIN: B000UPRBAW
- California and the West / Odd Photos / Las Vegas / Real Estate Photographs / Night Walk. Göttingen: Steidl, 2006. ISBN 978-3865211330. Five-volume set.
- Henry Wessel. Göttingen: Steidl; San Francisco: San Francisco Museum of Modern Art, 2007. ISBN 978-3865213914. Retrospective. With an essay by Sandra S. Phillips.
- Waikiki. Göttingen: Steidl, 2012. ISBN 978-3869303000.
- Incidents. Göttingen: Steidl, 2013. ISBN 978-3869306971.
- Sunset Park. Göttingen: Steidl, 2016. ISBN 978-3958291133
- Continental Divide. Göttingen: Steidl, 2016. ISBN 978-3958291157
- Traffic. Göttingen: Steidl, 2016. ISBN 978-3958291140
- Traffic / Sunset Park / Continental Divide. Göttingen: Steidl, 2016. ISBN 978-3-95829-275-8.

=== Publications with contributions by Wessel ===
- Looking at Photographs: 100 Pictures from the Collection of The Museum of Modern Art. New York: Museum of Modern Art, 1973. ISBN 978-0870705151. By John Szarkowski.
- Henry Wessel. Göttingen: Steidl, San Francisco Museum of Modern Art, and Die Photographische Sammlung/SK Stiftung Kultur, 2007. ISBN 978-3865213914. Edited by Thomas Zander with introductions by Sandra S. Phillips and George Imdahl.
- New Topographics: Roberts Adams, Lewis Baltz, Bernd and Hilla Becher, Joe Deal, Frank Gohlke, Nicholas Nixon, John Schott, Stephen Shore, Henry Wessel Jr.. Göttingen: Steidl, 2009. ISBN 978-3865218278. Includes the work of Robert Adams, Lewis Baltz, Bernd and Hilla Becher, Joe Deal, Frank Grohlke, Nicholas Nixon, John Schott, Stephen Shore and Henry Wessel Jr.
- Closer than Fiction: American Visual Worlds around 1970. Walther König, Köln, Germany, 2011. ISBN 978-3863351199. Edited and with introduction by Brigitte Franzen and Anna Sophia Schultz.
- Under the Big Black Sun: California Art, 1974-1981, Museum of Contemporary Art, Los Angeles, 2011. ISBN 978-3791351391. Edited by Elizabeth Hamilton.
- Here., San Francisco: Pier 24 Photography, 2011. ISBN 978-0-9839917-0-0. Exhibition guide.
- About Face, San Francisco: Pier 24 Photography, 2012. ISBN 978-0-9839917-1-7. Exhibition guide.
- About Face. San Francisco: Pier 24 Photography, 2014. ISBN 978-0-9839917-2-4. Exhibition catalog. Edition of 1000 copies. With forewords by Christopher McCall, and Richard Avedon (from In The American West), an introduction by Philip Gefter, and texts by Sandra S. Phillips, and Ulrike Schneider.

== Exhibitions ==
=== Solo ===
- 1972–1973: Museum of Modern Art, New York, NY.
- 1987: International Museum of Photography, Osaka, Japan
- 1998: Museum of Contemporary Art, Los Angeles, CA.
- 2007: Henry Wessel: Photographs, San Francisco Museum of Modern Art, San Francisco, CA.
- 2007: Henry Wessel, Die Photographische Sammlung, SK Stiftung Kultur, Cologne, Germany.
- 2014–2015: Incidents, Tate Modern, London.

=== Group ===
- 1975: New Topographics: Photographs of a Man-Altered Landscape, International Museum of Photography, George Eastman House, Rochester, NY.
- 1978: Mirrors and Windows: American Photography Since 1960, Museum of Modern Art, New York, NY.
- 1983: Twentieth Century Photographs from the Museum of Modern Art, Museum of Modern Art, New York, and Seibu Museum of Art, Tokyo, Japan.
- 1989: Picturing California: A Century of Photographic Genius, Oakland Museum, CA.
- 1991: Pleasures and Terrors of Domestic Comfort, Museum of Modern Art, New York, NY.
- 1993: Critical Landscape, Tokyo Metropolitan Museum of Photography, Japan.
- 1996: Crossing the Frontier: Photographs of the Developing West 1849 to the Present, San Francisco Museum of Modern Art, San Francisco, CA.
- 2000: Walker Evans & Company, Museum of Modern Art, New York, NY.
- 2003: Looking at Photographs, State Hermitage Museum, St. Petersburg, Russia.
- 2005: Amerikanische Street Photography, Stadtische Galerie Wolfsburg, Wolfsburg, Germany.
- 2005: Garry Winogrand and American Street Photographers Mitch Epstein, Lee Friedlander, Joel Meyerowitz, and Henry Wessel, Foam Fotografiemuseum Amsterdam, Amsterdam, Netherlands
- 2009: Into the Sunset Image of the American West, Museum of Modern Art, New York.
- 2011–2012: Focus: Los Angeles, 1945–1980, The J. Paul Getty Museum, Los Angeles, CA.
- 2011–2012: Under the Big Black Sun: California Art, 1974–1981, Museum of Contemporary Art, Los Angeles, CA.
- 2011–2012: Here., Pier 24 Photography, San Francisco, CA (May 2011 – January 2012)
- 2012–2013: About Face, Pier 24 Photography, San Francisco, CA (May 2012– April 2013)

== Awards ==
- 1971: Guggenheim Fellowship from the John Simon Guggenheim Memorial Foundation.
- 1975: National Endowment for the Arts Fellowship in Photography.
- 1977: National Endowment for the Arts Fellowship in Photography.
- 1978: National Endowment for the Arts Fellowship in Photography.
- 1978: Guggenheim Fellowship from the John Simon Guggenheim Memorial Foundation.

== Collections ==
Wessel's work is held in the following public collections:

- Art Institute of Chicago, Illinois
- Amon Carter Museum of American Art, Fort Worth, Texas
- Australian National Gallery, Canberra, Australia
- Berkeley Art Museum and Pacific Film Archive, Berkeley, California
- California Historical Society, San Francisco, California
- Crocker Art Museum, Sacramento, California
- Denver Art Museum, Denver, Colorado
- Fogg Art Museum, Harvard University, Cambridge, Massachusetts
- George Eastman Museum, Rochester, New York
- Solomon R. Guggenheim Museum, New York
- Los Angeles County Museum of Art, CA
- Museum of Contemporary Art, Los Angeles, California
- Museum of Contemporary Photography, Chicago
- Museum of Fine Arts, Boston, Massachusetts
- Museum of Fine Arts, Houston, Texas
- Museum of Modern Art, New York City
- National Gallery of Art, Washington DC
- National Gallery of Canada, Ottawa, Canada
- Orange County Museum of Art, Newport Beach, California
- Oakland Museum of California, California
- Philadelphia Museum of Art, Pennsylvania
- Santa Barbara Museum of Art, Santa Barbara, California
- San Francisco Museum of Modern Art, San Francisco, California
- Seattle Art Museum, Seattle, Washington
- Tate Modern, London
- Tokyo Metropolitan Museum of Photography, Japan
- Whitney Museum of American Art, New York
- Victoria and Albert Museum, London
