= Joe Deal =

American photographer (1947–2010)

- Born: August 12, 1947; Topeka, Kansas, U.S.
- Died: June 18, 2010 (aged 62); Providence, Rhode Island, U.S.
- Education: Kansas City Art Institute (BFA); University of New Mexico (MFA)
- Occupations: Photographer, educator
- Years active: 1970–2010
- Spouse: Betsy Sara Ruppa
- Children: 1

Joseph Maurice Deal (August 12, 1947 – June 18, 2010) was an American photographer who specialized in depicting how the landscape was transformed by people.

== Early life and education ==
Deal was born in Topeka, Kansas on August 12, 1947, and was raised in Albany, Missouri and Saint Paul, Minnesota. He attended the Kansas City Art Institute, where he earned a Bachelor of Fine Arts degree. After his graduation in 1970, he was designated as a conscientious objector by the local draft board and was assigned to work as a guard and janitor at the George Eastman Museum in Rochester, New York, and its museum of photography. He later earned a master's degree in photography and a Master of Fine Arts degree from the University of New Mexico.

== Career ==
While working on his thesis for his MFA degree in the 1970s, Deal started teaching at the University of California, Riverside, where he helped establish the California Museum of Photography. In 1989, he became dean of the School of Art at Washington University in St. Louis. He was named to serve as provost of the Rhode Island School of Design in Providence, Rhode Island in 1999, and lived there for the remainder of his life.

In the mid-1970s, Deal was one of ten photographers chosen to participate in the "New Topographics: Photographs of a Man-Altered Landscape" exhibition curated by William Jenkins at the International Museum of Photography at George Eastman House. Deal contributed 18 black and white photographs to the exhibit in a 32 cm × 32 cm format. Many of the photographs Deal submitted featured homes newly constructed against the desolate landscape of the American Southwest.

Backyard, Yorba Linda, California (1984), an example of Deal's photographs of new suburban development in Southern California

He continued photographing the human effect on the landscape in The Fault Zone, which featured images combining human and geologic effects on the area surrounding the San Andreas Fault. Subdividing the Inland Basin featured suburban areas east of Los Angeles and Beach Cities focused on Pacific Ocean communities in Southern California. West and West: Reimagining the Great Plains featured photographs of the grid pattern of much of the Midwestern United States and was on exhibit at the University of Arizona's Center for Creative Photography in Tucson, Arizona after opening at the Rhode Island School of Design and being presented at New York City's Robert Mann Gallery.

== Personal life ==
Deal was married to Betsy Sara Ruppa. They had one daughter. He had lived in Providence, Rhode Island for a decade when he died of bladder cancer on June 18, 2010, at age 62.

== Monographs ==
- Joe Deal: Southern California Photographs, 1976–86. Albuquerque: University of New Mexico Press in association with the Los Angeles Municipal Art Gallery. 1992. ISBN 978-0-8263-1334-8.
- Between Nature and Culture: Photographs of the Getty Center by Joe Deal. Los Angeles: J. Paul Getty Museum. 1999. ISBN 978-0-89236-549-4.
