= 4-H =

Youth development organization

- Official 4-H emblem
- Formation: 1912–1914
- Type: Youth organization
- Legal status: Federal governmental program administered through Land-grant university system in each state and territory
- Headquarters: Washington, DC
- Region served: United States (affiliated programs worldwide)
- Members: 6.5 million members in the United States, ages 5 to 21
- Main organ: National Institute of Food and Agriculture (NIFA)
- Parent organization: United States Department of Agriculture (USDA)
- Affiliations: Land-grant university system, National 4-H Council
- Website: www.nifa.usda.gov/4-h 4-h.org

4-H is a national youth development program administered by the Cooperative Extension System under the National Institute of Food and Agriculture (NIFA) and United States Department of Agriculture (USDA). 4-H provides educational opportunities for youth related to agriculture, STEM, healthy living, family and consumer sciences, leadership, and civic engagement. The name of 4-H refers to the organization's focus on developing four personal qualities among youth: Head, Heart, Hands, and Health. The mission of 4-H is "to provide meaningful opportunities for all youth and adults to work together to create sustainable community change." 4-H is the United States' largest youth development organization with over six million members nationwide.

4-H operates as a partnership between federal, state, and local authorities. Federal leadership is provided by the National Institute of Food and Agriculture (NIFA), an agency within the United States Department of Agriculture (USDA). State-level leadership is provided by each state's land-grant university. Local 4-H programs are facilitated through county-based Extension staff.

== History ==
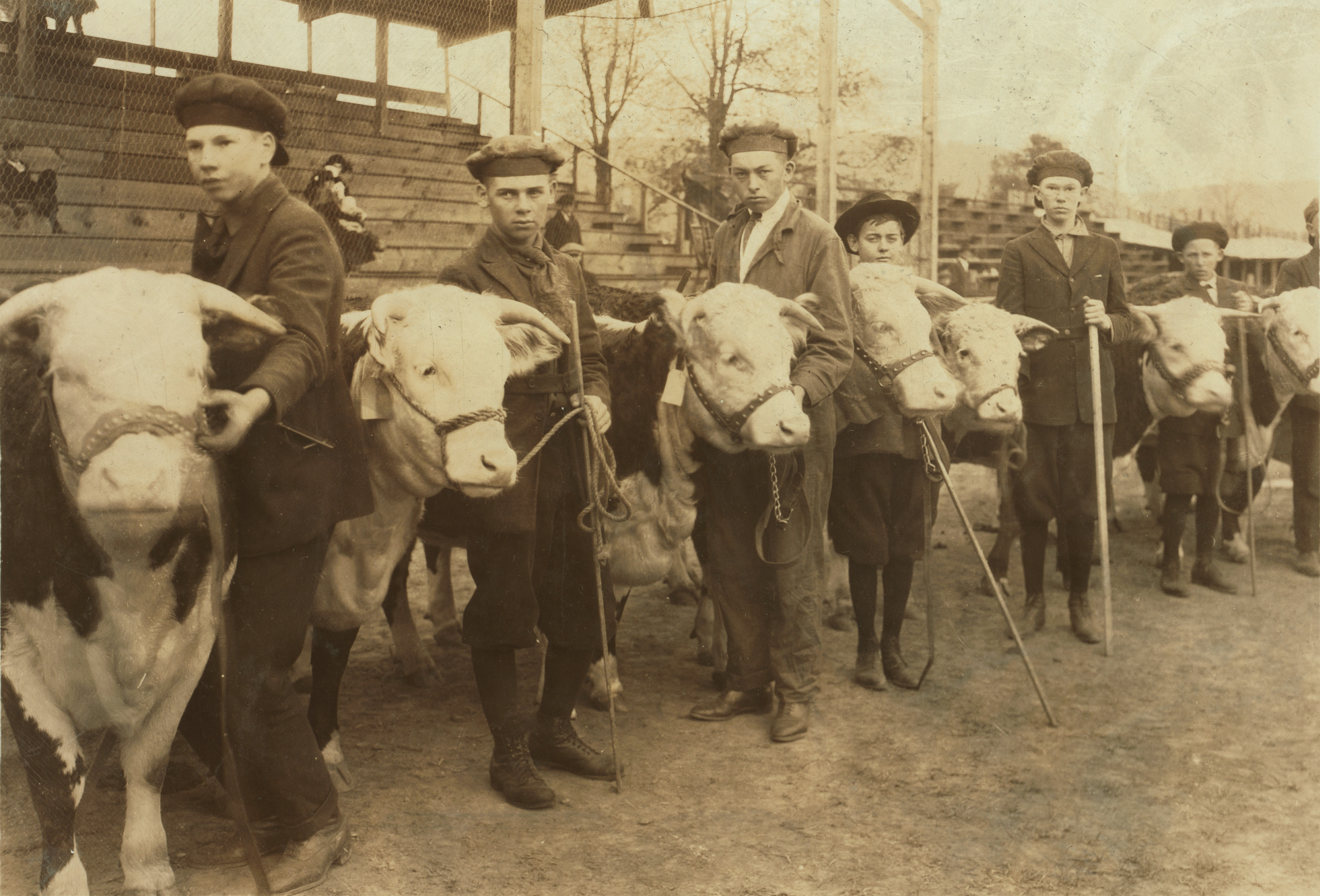
4-H boys showing prize heifers at a 4-H Fair in Charleston, West Virginia, 1921

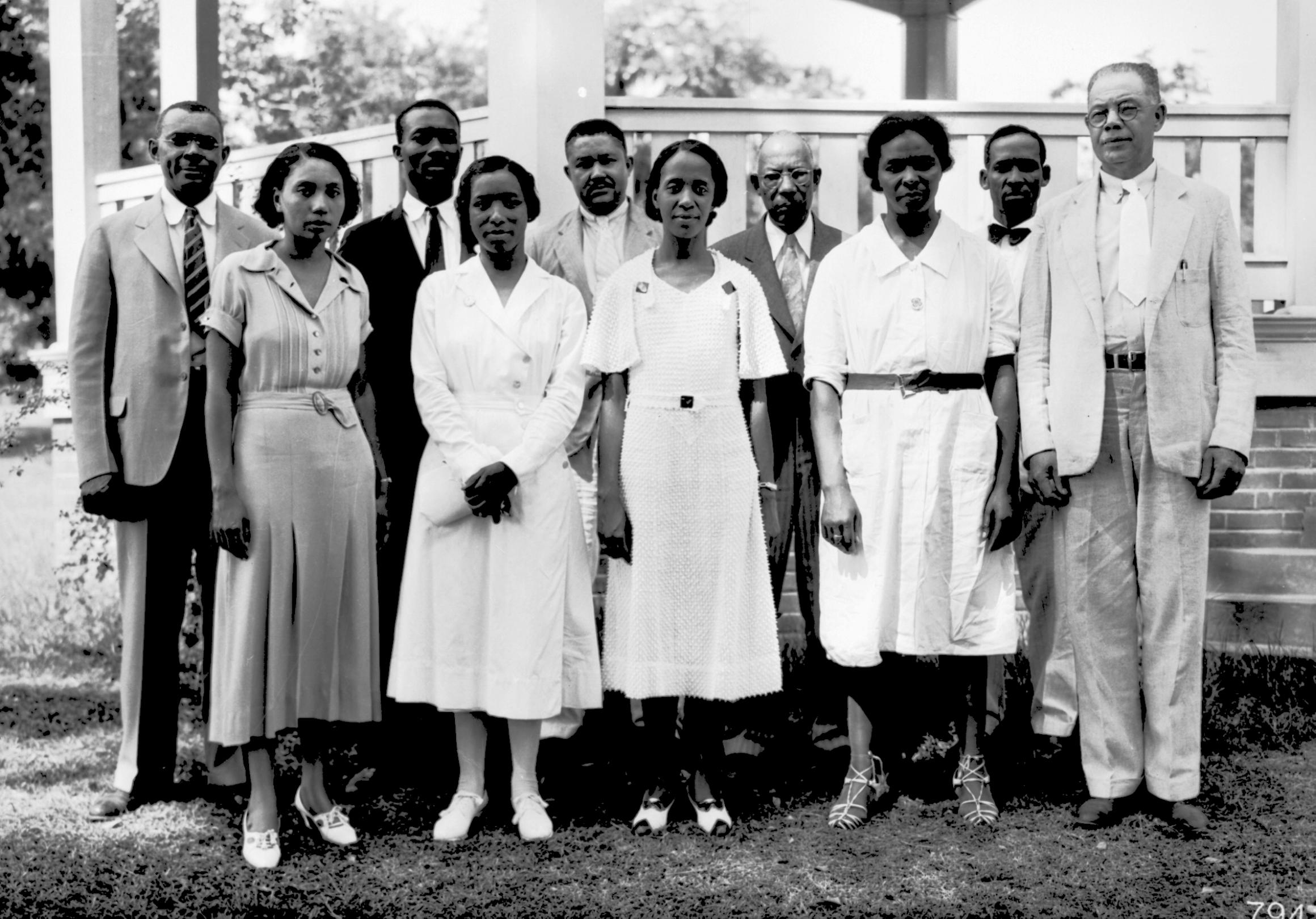
4-H Home demonstration agents in Florida in 1933

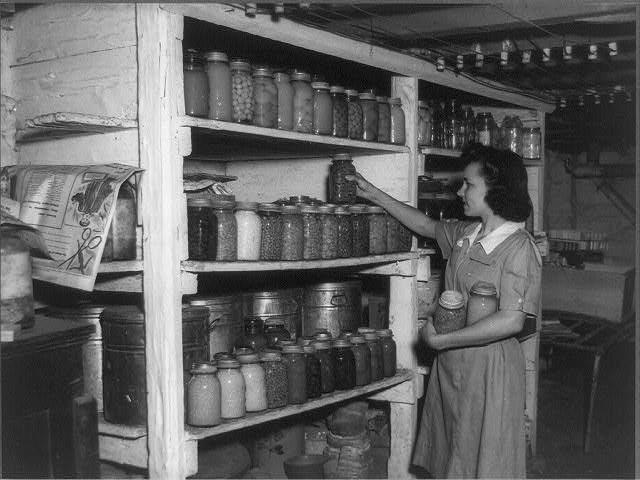
4-H Club member storing food she canned from her garden, Rockbridge County, Virginia, c. 1942

The foundations of 4-H began in 1902 with the work of several people in different parts of the United States. The focal point of 4-H has been the idea of practical and hands-on learning, which came from the desire to make public school education more connected to rural life. Early programs incorporated both public and private resources. 4-H was founded with the purpose of instructing rural youth in improved farming and farm-homemaking practices. By the 1970s, it was broadening its goals to cover a full range of youth, including minorities, and a wide range of life experiences.

A brochure for the 4-H Forestry Program

During this time, researchers at experiment stations of the land-grant universities and USDA saw that adults in the farming community did not readily accept new agricultural discoveries. However, educators found that youth would experiment with these new ideas and then share their experiences and successes with the adults. As a result, rural youth programs became a way to introduce new agriculture technology to the adults.

Historians do not credit one sole founder. Instances of work with rural boys and girls can be found all throughout the 19th century. In the spring of 1882, Delaware College announced a statewide corn contest for boys, in which each boy was to plant a quarter of an acre, according to instructions sent out from the college, and cash prizes, certificates, and subscriptions to the American Agriculturist were rewarded.

In 1892, in an effort to improve the Kewaunee County Fair, Ransom Asa Moore, the president of the Kewaunee Fair, the Agricultural Society, and Superintendent of the Kewaunee County Schools in Wisconsin, organized a "youth movement", which he called "Young People's Contest Clubs", in which he solicited the support of 6,000 young farm folks to produce and exhibit fruits, vegetables, and livestock. The fairs were quite successful. In 1904, while working for the University of Wisconsin–Madison and trying to repeat what he had accomplished in Kewaunee County over a decade before but with different intentions, "Daddy" R.A. Moore convinced R.H. Burns, then Superintendent of Schools of Richland County, Wisconsin, to have the Richland County Boys and Girls organize and assist in a corn-project activity to help market and distribute improved seeds to the farmers in the state of Wisconsin (and beyond).

A. B. Graham began one of the youth programs in Clark County, Ohio, in 1902, which is also considered one of the births of the 4-H program in the United States. The first club was called "The Tomato Club" or the "Corn Growing Club". T.A. "Dad" Erickson of Douglas County, Minnesota, started local agricultural after-school clubs and fairs also in 1902. Jessie Field Shambaugh developed the clover pin with an H on each leaf in 1910, and, by 1912, they were called 4-H clubs. Early 4-H programs in Colorado began with youth instruction offered by college agricultural agents as early as 1910, as part of the outreach mission of the Colorado land grant institutions.

The national 4-H organization was formed in 1914, when the United States Congress created the Cooperative Extension Service of the USDA by passage of the Smith-Lever Act of 1914, it included within the CES charter the work of various boys' and girls' clubs involved with agriculture, home economics and related subjects. The Smith-Lever Act formalized the 4-H programs and clubs that began in the midwestern region of the United States. Although different activities were emphasized for boys and girls, 4-H was one of the first youth organizations to give equal attention to both genders (cf., erstwhile Boys Clubs of America). The first appearance of the term "4-H Club" in a federal document was in "Organization and Results of Boys' and Girls' Club Work," by Oscar Herman Benson (1875–1951) and Gertrude L. Warren, in 1920. By 1924, the clubs were organized as 4-H clubs, and the clover emblem was adopted. Warren expanded the scope of girls' activities under the program (promoting garment making, room decorating, and hot lunches), and wrote extensive training materials.

The first 4-H camp was held in Randolph County, West Virginia. Originally, these camps were for what was referred to as "Corn Clubs". Campers slept in corn fields in tents, only to wake up and work almost the entirety of each day. Superintendent of Schools G. C. Adams began a boys' corn club in Newton County, Georgia, in 1904.

4-H membership hit an all-time high in 1974 as a result of its popular educational program about nutrition, Mulligan Stew, shown in schools and on television across the country. Today, 4-H clubs and activities are no longer focused primarily on agricultural activities, instead emphasizing personal growth and preparation for lifelong learning. Participation is greatest during the elementary school years, with enrollment in programs and activities peaking in the 4th grade.

In the American South during the mid-1960s, 4-H began to broaden its programming to cover life experiences unrelated to agriculture. It merged its segregated African American and white programs, but full-fledged integration proved elusive. 4-H was successful in removing gender-based restrictions on participation.

The organization is funded by the USDA and by state and local governments. The National 4-H Council's programs are also supported by a number of corporations including Google, Verizon, Microsoft, Land O'Lakes Inc., and Tractor Supply Co.

Past Honorary Chairmen of Council have included U.S. Presidents Calvin Coolidge, Herbert Hoover, Franklin D. Roosevelt, Harry Truman, Dwight Eisenhower, John F. Kennedy, Lyndon B. Johnson, Richard Nixon, Jimmy Carter, Ronald Reagan, George H. W. Bush, and Bill Clinton.

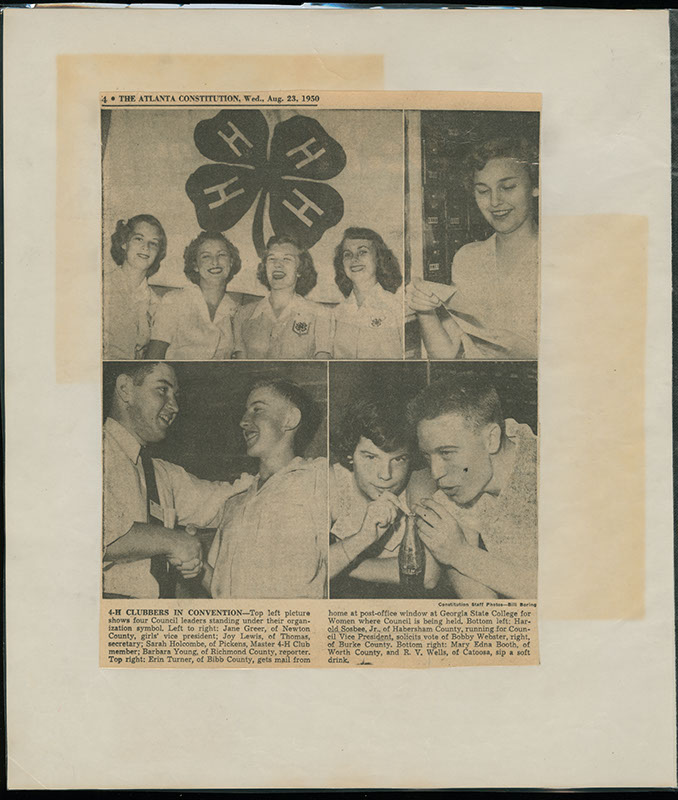
A newspaper clipping of 4-H club members attending a convention in Georgia, 1950

== Pledge ==
The 4-H Pledge articulates the organization's values and goals for its members. 4-H members traditionally recite the pledge at club meetings and other 4-H events. The 4-H pledge is:

I pledge my head to clearer thinking,
my heart to greater loyalty,
my hands to larger service, and
my health to better living,
for my club, my community, my country and my world.

The 4-H Pledge was adopted nationwide in 1927 at the first National 4-H Club Camp held in Washington, DC. It was written by Otis Hall, a state 4-H leader from Kansas. In 1973, the pledge was modified slightly when the phrase "and my world" was added to the final line.

== Emblem ==
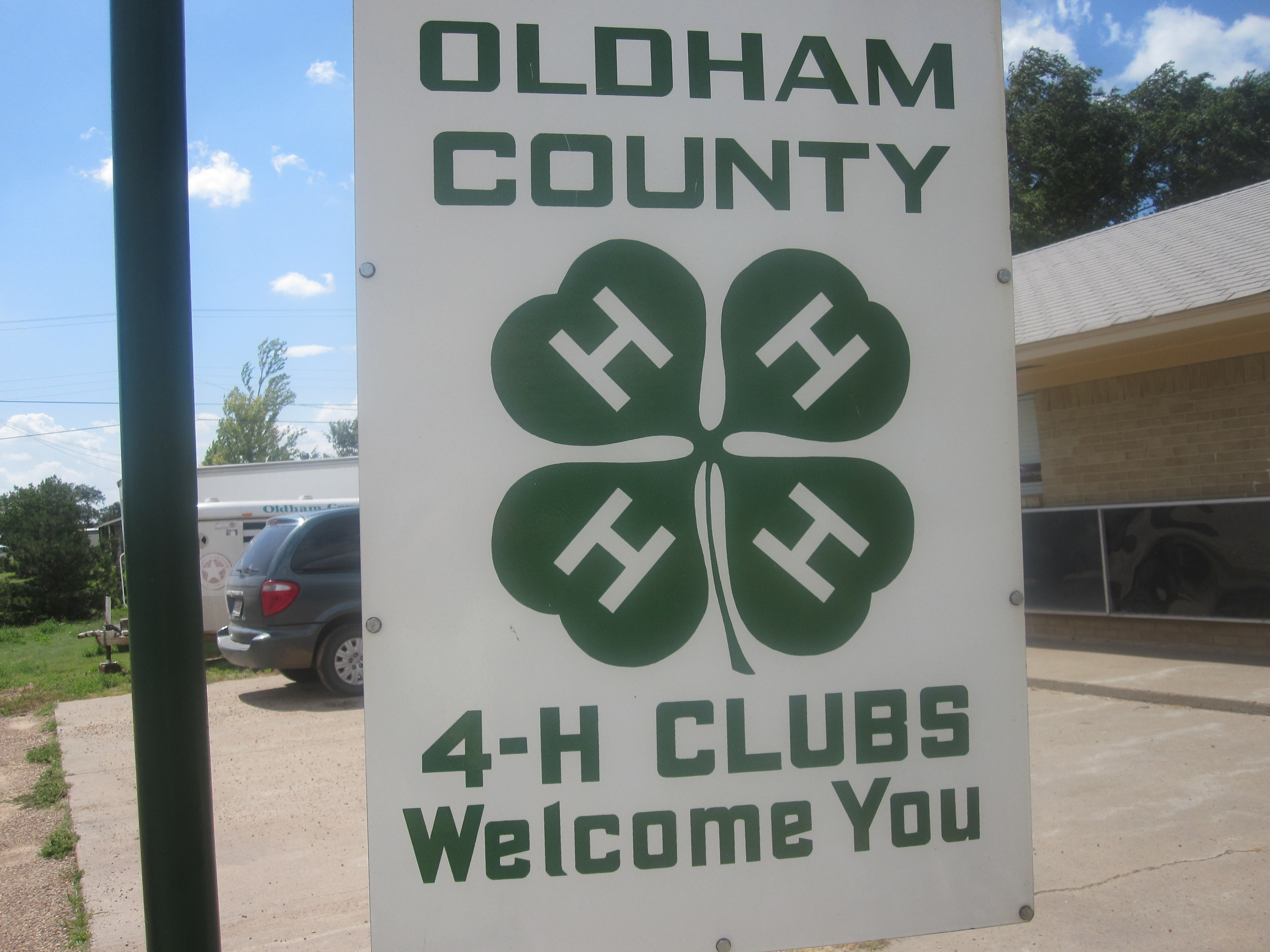
4-H emblem in Oldham County in Vega west of Amarillo, Texas

The official emblem of 4-H is a green four-leaf clover. There is a white H on each leaf to represent the four values of Head, Heart, Hands, and Health. The stem of the clover always points to the right. The emblem was initially designed in 1907 by O. H. Benson, the superintendent of Wright County Schools in Iowa. Some believe that Benson selected the four leaf clover because it represented the idea of "four-square education," an approach to education that emphasizes the balanced development of education, physical growth, moral character, and fellowship.

=== Federal protection ===
The 4-H name and emblem were previously federally protected under federal code 18 U.S.C. 707, which was enacted in 1939 and amended in 1948. This act prohibited unauthorized use of the 4-H name or emblem, and entrusted the Secretary of Agriculture with its care and protection. This protection was a unique privilege shared by only a few national symbols such as the Presidential Seal and Smokey Bear. 18 U.S.C. 707 was repealed under the Consolidated Appropriations Act of 2021. Title X of this Act, originally introduced as the Clean Up the Code Act of 2019, removed certain outdated provisions from the U.S. criminal code, including protection of the 4-H name and emblem.

== Youth development research ==
Through the program's tie to land-grant institutions of higher education, 4-H academic staff are responsible for advancing the field of youth development. Professional academic staff are committed to innovation, the creation of new knowledge, and the dissemination of new forms of program practice and research. Youth development research is undertaken in a variety of forms including program evaluation, applied research, and introduction of new programs.

== Volunteers ==
Over 500,000 volunteer leaders help to coordinate the 4-H program at the county level. Volunteers plan and conduct 4-H related activities, develop and maintain educational programs, or assist in fundraising. Activities include youth development programs, project groups, camps, conferences, or animal shows. The volunteers' goal is to help youth achieve greater self-confidence and self-responsibility, learn new skills, and build relationships.

Volunteers are directed by 4-H's professional staff.

== Additional programs ==
=== Afterschool ===
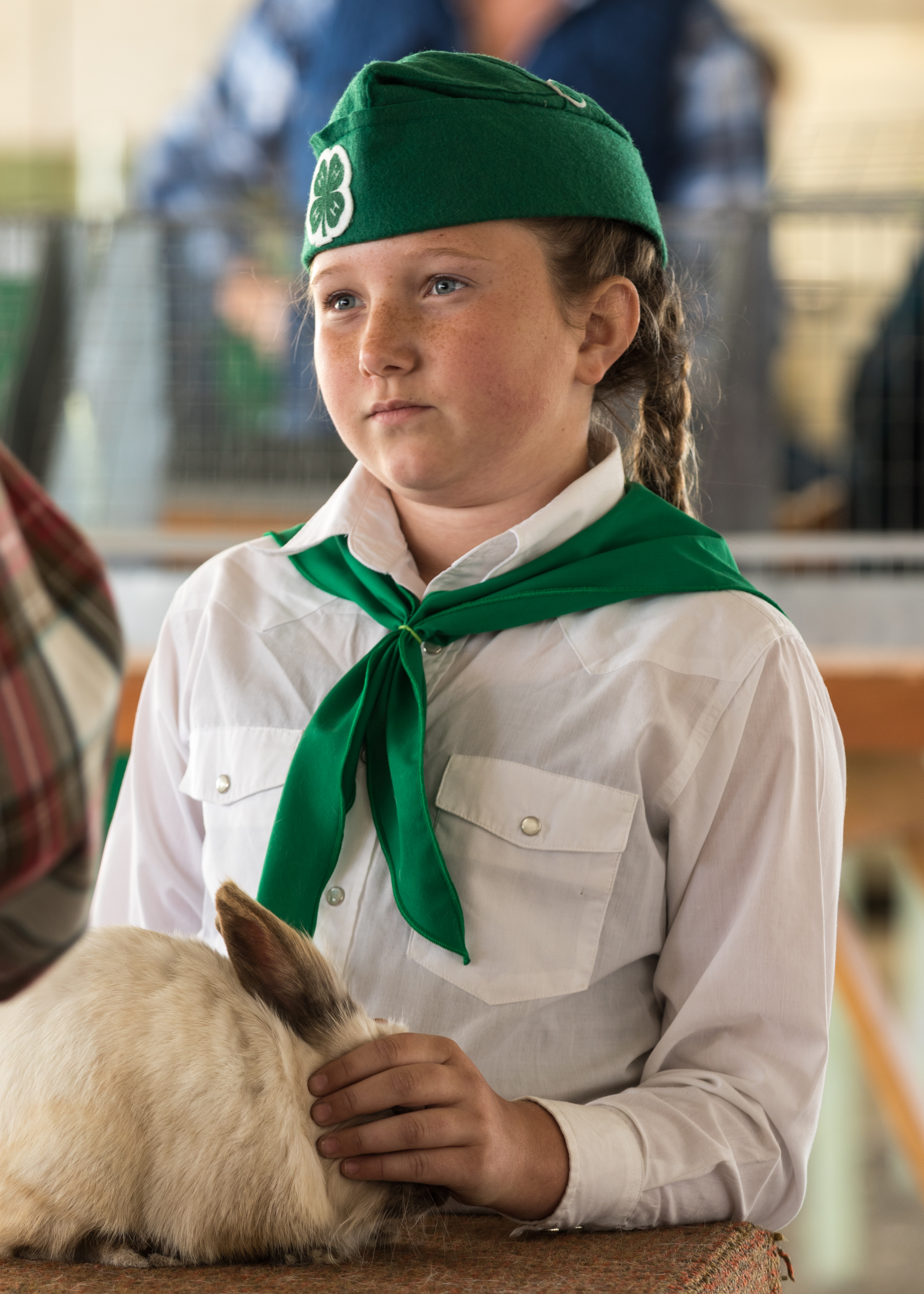
A girl presenting her rabbit at the Calaveras County Fair in California 2016

4-H Afterschool helps 4-H and other youth-serving organizations create and improve programs for students in communities across the U.S. 4-H Afterschool is an extension-enhanced program that:

- Offers youth a safe, healthy, caring and enriching environment.
- Engages youth in long-term, structured learning in partnership with adults.
- Addresses the interests of youth and their physical, cognitive, social and emotional needs.

4-H Afterschool programs utilize experimental and cooperative learning activities and provide interaction with competent adults. Results of retrospective pre/post-surveys indicate that children enrolled in the program showed life skill gain over time, and that gains on specific life skills differed as a function of age, gender, and ethnicity.

The life skills gained through 4-H Afterschool give children the tools they need for perceiving and responding to diverse life situations and achieving their personal goals. Participation in these programs which use experiential and cooperative learning have all been found to contribute to children's social development and academic success.

=== Camping ===
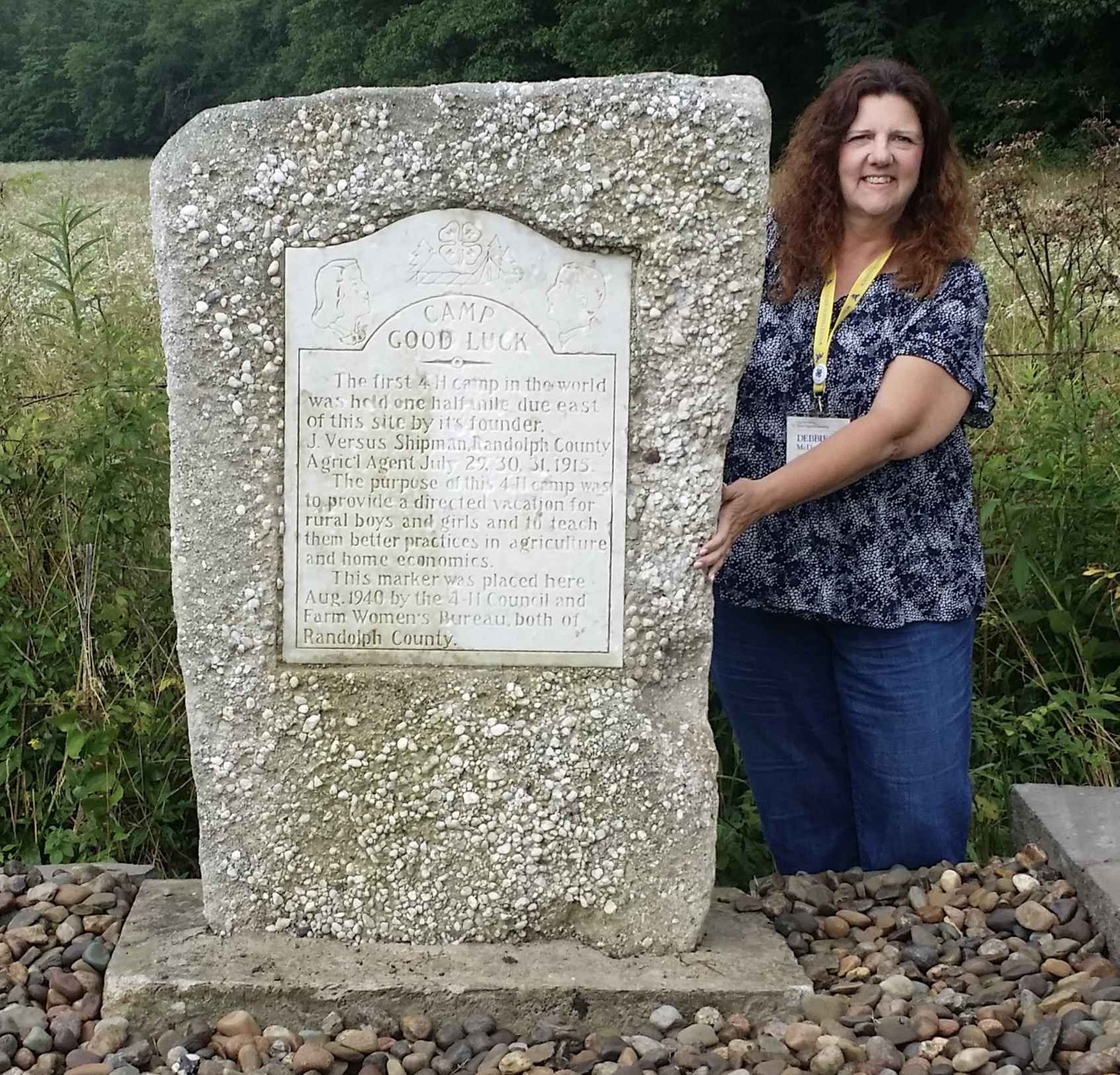
Debbie McDonald, who was the West Virginia state 4-H Leader at the time, poses with the newly relocated Camp Good Luck marker (8 July 2015).

Each state runs its own camping program. Believed to be the world's first 4-H camp was held in July 1915 on the Crouch family farm along the Tygart Valley River near Elkwater, West Virginia. The youth in attendance named the location Camp Good Luck.

The first state 4-H camp was held at Jackson's Mill outside of Weston, West Virginia. 4-H camping programs in most states are run through land-grant institutions, such as Washington State University, which runs the Washington program, and Pennsylvania State University runs Pennsylvania's. The Georgia 4-H camping program has the largest youth center in the world, called Rock Eagle.

On 8 July 2015, to mark the centennial of 4-H camping, youth from Randolph County, West Virginia traveled back to the original Camp Good Luck site for a special commemoration and campfire program. A stone marker honoring Camp Good Luck had been placed adjacent to US 219 near the site but was moved to a spot off of Bell Crouch Rd. for greater safety and accessibility through the efforts of Randolph County 4-H volunteers and the West Virginia Division of Highways.

=== Five- to seven-year-old youth ===
Some states offer programs for youths in grades K-2 called Cloverbuds, Cloverkids, 4-H Adventurers, Primary Members, or Mini 4-H to youth ages five to seven. These programs provide a non-competitive learning environment and provide an introduction to a 4-H club experience.

=== Collegiate ===
National Collegiate 4-H club emblem

Many colleges and universities have collegiate 4-H clubs. Usually members are students who are 4-H alumni and want to continue a connection to 4-H, but any interested students are welcome. Clubs provide service and support to their local and state 4-H programs, such as serving as judges and conducting training workshops. They are also a service and social group for campus students. The first collegiate 4-H club started in 1916 on the Oklahoma State University - Stillwater campus.

=== All Stars ===
Finding its roots in the early 4-H movement in West Virginia, the 4-H All-Star program strives to recognize and challenge 4-H members and volunteers. State 4-H Club Leader William H. "Teepi" Kendrick sought to develop youth to "be yourself at your best" and to "make the best better" through a fourfold personal development pattern involving the head, hands, heart, and, at that time, hustle. It was with this philosophy, in collaboration with others, that the 4-H emblem was born. In an attempt to harbor further individual growth, Kendrick recognized excellence with pins bearing one, two, three, and four H's. Recognition for outstanding participation was rewarded from 1917 to 1921 with trips to a Prize Winner's Course at West Virginia University. Members who demonstrated outstanding qualities at these courses were awarded five-pointed red pins with five H's, with this additional H to symbolize honor. The recipients of these pins were referred to by Kendrick as "All Stars". It was following the pin consecration ceremony in 1919 that the official West Virginia 4-H All Stars organization was chartered, becoming the Alpha chapter of the nationwide 4-H honorary.

The symbol of the All Stars is a red star enveloping a gemstone chip over the 4-H emblem. Each point of the star represents a pillar of character: "Beauty, Fortitude, Service, Truth, and Love".

Many states have All Star programs, although All Star programs vary from state to state. Selection as a 4-H All Star is a recognition of achievement. In California for example, it is the highest achievement award at the county level and is a position awarded annually. Similarly, the capstone award in Texas 4-H is the Gold Star Award, which is given to Seniors who have shown outstanding leadership and proficiency in their project areas.

In Virginia, on the other hand, All-Stars are not simply those who have achieved an All-Star award, but are those who have gained membership into the Virginia All-Stars organization. After reaching the age of 15, 4-H members are eligible to apply for membership into the All-Stars organization, which promotes the continuation of 4-H principles.

== Conferences ==
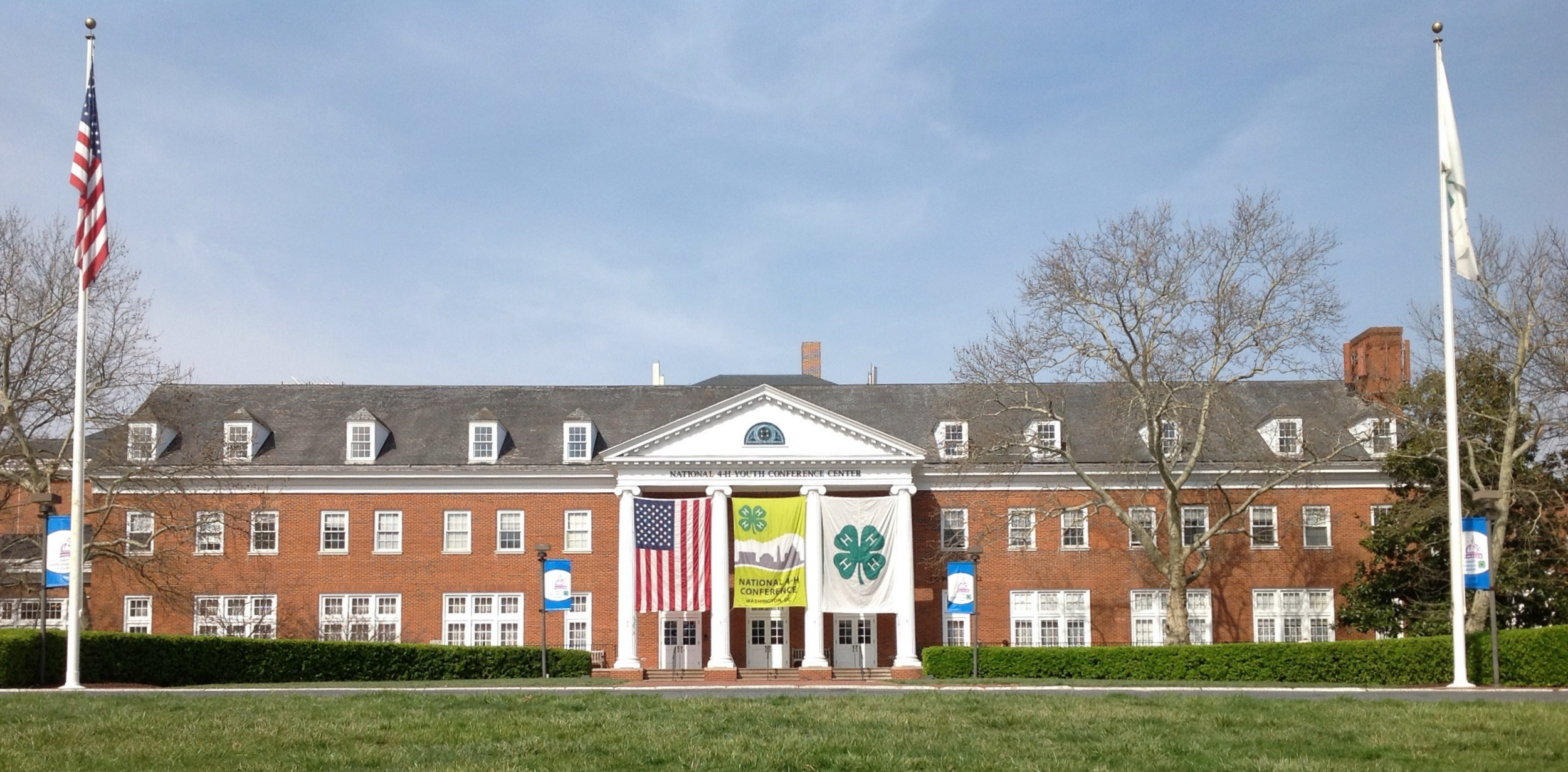
National 4-H Youth Conference Center in Chevy Chase, Maryland

Many conferences are held at various levels of the 4-H program for youth and adults. The National 4-H Conference, which was held at the National 4-H Youth Conference Center in Chevy Chase, Maryland, until it was sold in 2021, is the USDA Secretary's premier youth development opportunity to engage youth in developing recommendations for the 4-H Youth Development Program. The Conference still meets annually in and around Washington, DC. The National 4-H Conference is held in Arlington, VA.

The National 4-H Congress is an annual educational conference that brings together 4-H delegates between the ages of 14 and 19 from across America to share cultural experiences and discuss important issues facing youth. This five-day event is typically held during the weekend of Thanksgiving and has been hosted in Atlanta, since 1998. Throughout the conference, 4-H delegates attend numerous workshops, participate in community service activities, and listen to speakers in an effort to develop compassion and increase social awareness.

Citizenship Washington Focus is a week-long conference offered for high school-aged students. At the conference, students have the opportunity to learn how to be citizen leaders in their communities. Throughout the week in Washington, D.C., participants visit monuments, meet with members of Congress, and develop communication, leadership and citizenship skills.

The following national conferences are held yearly, and are focused on specific activities inside of 4-H:

- National 4-H Dairy Conference
- Eastern National 4-H Horse Roundup
- Western National 4-H Horse Roundup
- National 4-H Shooting Sports Invitational Match
- National 4-H True Leaders in Equity Institute
- National 4-H Youth Summit Series
  - STEM Summit
  - Healthy Living Summit
  - Agri-science Summit
- Ignite by 4-H

Other conferences are held by regional and state entities for youth, for volunteer development, or for professional development for staff.

== Use of Native American terminology ==
For many years, use of Native American names and certain themed activities was part of the summer camping programs of some eastern states. However, the practice was considered to be offensive and protests were raised. A complaint to the U.S. Department of Agriculture's Office of Civil Rights in 2002 and an ensuing investigation that threatened to cut off funds to the state's program prompted the West Virginia University Extension Service to abandon offensive and stereotypic practices such as face-painting, and use of imagery not a part of the culture of local Native people, such as tepees and totem poles. They also eliminated the practice of having children wear feather headdresses, and stopped having campers engage in "stereotypical motions and dances," including chanting "Ugh! Ugh! Ugh!". However, the state program deemed the dividing of campers into groups, called "tribes" named after actual Indian Nations, to be respectful and acceptable. In the same year, the Virginia Extension Service removed all references to symbols or camp "traditions" related to Native Americans, including the decades-long practice of dividing campers into "tribes" using names of nations considered native to Virginia, replacing the group names with animal names.

== International programs ==
Although 4-H was first founded in the United States in the early 1900s, more than 80 countries have since established their own versions of 4-H programs to offer government-supported youth development programming. Over 48 countries use some variation of the 4-H Clover symbol to identify their youth development programs.

4-H's global expansion was supported by foreign and U.S. government officials who saw youth development as a strategy to improve agricultural productivity. Canada was among the first to create their own 4-H program in 1913, although some suggest that 4-H Canada was created as early as 1905. European nations like Sweden and England began implementing 4-H programs in 1918 and 1921 respectively. Programs continued to develop across the globe into the 1930s and 1940s, with 4-H Clubs appearing in Australia, Haiti, and Venezuela. In the years following, 4-H was adopted in Korea (1947), Japan (1948), Kenya (1949), and Ethiopia (1956). In recent years, Iraq and Mongolia have developed their own 4-H programs and adopted the clover symbol.

== Alumni ==
Some 4-H alumni credit the program with helping them in later life.

The National 4-H Hall of Fame honors 4-H volunteers, extension professionals and staff employees, donors and others, according to a criterion of "significant impact on the 4-H program and/or 4-H members through the contribution of time, energy, financial resources, etc.". The hall of fame was established in 2002 by the National Association of Extension 4-H Youth Development Professionals (NAE4-HYDP).

== See also ==
- 4-H Shooting Sports Programs
- Boy Scouts of America
- Girl Scouts of the USA
- International Four-H Youth Exchange
- National Federation of Young Farmers' Clubs
- National FFA Organization (formerly Future Farmers of America)

== Bibliography ==
- Buck, Holly (2004). "'Amusements and Recreations... Makes Our Working Hours Profitable': Utah 4- H, 1940-1960". Utah Historical Quarterly. 72 (1): 69–84. doi:10.1093/whq/35.3.409.
- Holt, Marilyn Irvin (1992). "From Better Babies to 4-H: A Look at Rural America". Prologue: The Journal of the National Archives. 24 (3): 245–255.
- Holt, Marilyn Irvin. Linoleum, Better Babies, and the Modern Farm Woman, 1890-1930 (U of New Mexico Press, 1995).
- Keathley, Clarence R.; Ham, Donna M. (1979). "4-H Club Work in Missouri". Missouri Historical Review. 51 (1): 209–220.
- Kern, R. J. and Alison Nordström. The Unchosen Ones: Portraits of an American Pastoral (MW Editions, 2021).
- Rosenberg, Gabriel N. The 4-H Harvest: Sexuality and the State in Rural America (University of Pennsylvania Press, 2015)
- Thompson, Ellen Natasha. " The Changing Needs of Our Youth Today: The Response of 4-H to Social and Economic Transformations in Twentieth-century North Carolina." (PhD Diss. University of North Carolina at Greensboro, 2012). online
- Weber, Margaret. "Making the best better: 4-H and rural anxiety in the early twentieth century" (Thesis, Iowa State University; ProQuest Dissertations & Theses, 2013. 1540140). online at academic libraries
- Wessel, Thomas R. and Marilyn Wessel. 4-H: An American Idea, 1900-1980: A History of 4-H (Chevy Chase, MD: 4-H National Council, 1982).
