= Ransom Moore =

Ransom Moore may refer to:

- Ransom Asa Moore (1861-1941), an agronomist and professor at the University of Wisconsin-Madison
- Ransom B. Moore (1829-1904), American rancher and Arizona state legislator
- SS Ransom A. Moore, a 1944 U.S. World War II Liberty ship named for Ransom Asa Moore
