= R. J. Kern =

American artist (born 1978)

- Born: 1978 (age 47–48); Peekskill, New York, US
- Education: University of Colorado Boulder, Colgate University
- Known for: Photography
- Website: rjkern.com

R. J. Kern (born 1978) is an American artist, known for his photographs exploring identity, culture, and philosophical questions about nature and heritage through the interaction of people, animals and landscape. His work has been exhibited throughout the United States and in Canada, China, England, Finland, Georgia, Germany, Japan and Norway, at venues including the National Portrait Gallery, London, Rourke Art Museum, Museum of Modern Art Tbilisi, and Yixian International Photography Festival (Anhui, China) among many. Kern has received awards and recognition from the Taylor Wessing Photographic Portrait Prize, the photography non-profit CENTER, and the Royal Photographic Society of Great Britain, and was chosen one of PDN's "30 New and Emerging Photographers" in 2018.

Kern's work has been showcased by PBS, The Guardian (London), The Telegraph (London), the Star Tribune, and National Geographic, with a feature of his "The Unchosen Ones" and "Out to Pasture" series. In 2018, Kehrer Verlag published Kern's monograph, The Sheep and the Goats, which features a conversation with photographer Stuart Klipper and was named one of "The Most Beautiful German Books 2018" by design foundation Stiftung Buchkunst. Kern's next self-published monograph, The Unchosen Ones, won a 2018 Communication Arts "Award of Excellence." Public collections holding Kern's work include the Minneapolis Institute of Art, Museum of Fine Arts, Houston, the Worcester Art Museum, the Plains Art Museum, the Center for Creative Photography, and the Griffin Museum of Photography.

== Biography ==
Kern was born Robert James Kern in Peekskill, New York in 1978. The son of a military family, he grew up nomadically. Kern developed an interest in photography in high school, which he continued to pursue through independent studies while earning a double major in art & art history and environmental geography at Colgate University (Bachelor of Arts, 2000). He subsequently began working as a cartographer for National Geographic from 2000 to 2005, while earning an MA in Human Geography at the University of Colorado Boulder (2005).

Kern worked as a commercial photographer for nearly a decade gradually turning to a fine-art career, after being inspired by a trip photographing sheep in the Irish countryside in 2012. Those images earned him exhibition attention and a grant, and would form part of his first monograph, The Sheep and the Goats (Kehrer Verlag, 2018). The grant helped fund his next series, "The Unchosen Ones," composed of formal portraits of animals and their handlers at county-fair livestock competitions, which would form his second monograph, The Unchosen Ones: Portraits of an American Pastoral (MW Editions, 2021). Kern is represented by the Veronique Wantz Gallery and Olson Larsen Gallery. He works and lives with his family in Minneapolis, Minnesota.

== Career ==
R. J. Kern, Hazel, Geiranger Fjord, Norway, photograph, 2013. From the series, "Divine Animals: The Bovidae".

Kern's work focuses on the intimate, interdependent relationships of people, animals and landscape, exploring nature as a device for understanding ancestry, identity, myth, and history. He has been strongly influenced by 19th-century painters such as Albert Bierstadt, Thomas Sidney Cooper, William Holman Hunt and John Everett Millais, well as by Pictorialist photography. Critics often note Kern's use of natural and artificial lighting, and his saturated palette, thoughtful composing of subject and landscape, and attention to detail in shadows. His work has been described by various critics as lush and painterly, dramatic and surreal, ethereal, and beatific.

The images in Kern's The Sheep and the Goats monograph comprise two bodies of work depicting domesticated animals in landscape settings. "The Bovidae: Divine Animals" series (2012–6), featuring images such as Hazel, Geiranger Fjord, Norway (2013), is set in Kern and his wife's ancestral lands of Ireland, Germany, Norway and Iceland. In the "Out to Pasture" series (2015–7), Kern focused on "retired" show animals in natural settings in his home state of Minnesota. Curator Lisa Volpe, of Houston's Museum of Fine Arts, wrote that the portraits suggested wisdom and self-assurance in their "unperturbed stillness." Assessing images such as Dumb and Dumber, Freeborn County, Minnesota, USA (2016), Elly Thomas of World Photography Organisation identified their unique perspective on the contemporary meaning of pastoral. Lenscratch's Aline Smithson wrote that Kern celebrated "animals with a painter's eye, bringing old master lighting to the natural world."

R. J. Kern, Dumb and Dumber, Freeborn County, Minnesota, USA, photograph, 2016. From the series, "Out to Pasture".

"The Unchosen Ones" series grew out of Kern's interest in continuing his work locally. He found the county fair system an ideal venue to find subjects. Describing his approach, he said, "I was more interested in photographing the 'also rans' than the Grand Champions. We all know what it is like to be 'unchosen'—maybe for a job, for love, or a juried group exhibition. Empathy is a key component." The series consists of over 65 portraits of handlers and their animals that weren't champions at ten Minnesota county fairs, stylized and made formal by a studio-style backdrop. Reviewers in the Boston Globe and Lenscratch wrote that images, such as Kenzi and Hootie, Anoka County Fair, Minnesota, 2016, "pull at the heartstrings," capturing both subjects with dignity, respect and mutuality, but not sentimentality. Writer Alison Nordström noted that like the best documentary, the work "transcends the specificity of time and place." Other critics, such as The Telegraph's Hettie Judah, suggested that they touched on the ethics of breeding and the human ability to imagine itself separate from the natural world, or "the dwindling lifeways of small, family-owned farms" and human-animal bonds. The portraits—all collected in Kern's second monograph, The Unchosen Ones—were widely recognized through exhibitions in London (National Portrait Gallery), Japan, the Colorado Photographic Arts Center, and throughout the United States and Canada as part of the traveling show "The FENCE: A Public Photography Exhibition Series" (2016–7). In 2019, the series was featured in a solo exhibition of ten photographs at the Plains Art Museum in Fargo, North Dakota.

R. J. Kern, Kenzi and Hootie, Anoka County Fair, Minnesota, 2016, photograph, 2016. From the series, "The Unchosen Ones". Collection of the Minneapolis Institute of Art.

Kern returned to the Minnesota State Fair as a subject in 2018 and 2019. His series "The Best of the Best" showcased pairs of 2018 prizewinners (including livestock, bunnies, geese) in an exhibition concurrent with the 2019 fair; curator Deborah Ultan described them as "significant portraits, almost like archetypes” that bridge the history of photography with the present. Kern was commissioned as the 2019 Minnesota State Fair commemorative artist, the first photographer chosen to create the fair's official artwork, which is featured on prints, posters and merchandise. For the commemorative work, Minnesota State Fair Supreme Champion Pairings from 2018, he photographed difficult-to-wrangle prizewinning farm animals (from horses, llamas to dogs and ducks) individually, their positions mapped out, then combined the images into one print in which the animals appear to be standing together in a row.

== Awards and collections ==
Kern has been recognized with several awards and honors. For "The Unchosen Ones," he received: CENTER's 2017 Curator's Choice Award (First Place); Second Place at the National Gallery of Art's 2017 International Juried Exhibition; a Silver Medal at the Royal Photographic Society's 2017 International Photography Exhibition; and was a Finalist for the British Taylor Wessing Photographic Portrait Prize and the Renaissance Photography Prize 2017. He has also been awarded multiple Minnesota State Arts Board Artist Initiative Grants (2016, 2018, 2020, 2021, 2022, 2024, 2025). In 2018, Kern was chosen one of PDN's "30 New and Emerging Photographers" and Photolucida's "Critical Mass Top 50" in 2018, 2021, and 2024 and was an artist in residence at Lakewood Cemetery in 2025. Kern's work resides in several permanent public collections, including the Museum of Fine Arts Houston, Museum of Fine Arts, St. Petersburg, Minneapolis Institute of Art, Plains Art Museum, Center for Creative Photography, Griffin Museum of Photography, Nevada Museum of Art, and the corporate art collections of Fidelity, General Mills, and US Bank.

== Books ==
- Kern, R. J. (2018). The Sheep and the Goats, Germany: Kehrer Verlag. ISBN 9783868288353
- Kern, R. J. (2018). The Unchosen Ones, Minneapolis: R. J. Kern. ISBN 9780692105801
- Kern, R. J. (2021). The Unchosen Ones: Portraits of an American Pastoral, New York: MW Editions. ISBN 9781735762937
