= J. H. Winchester & Company =

Former US Shipping Company

- Industry: Shipping
- Founded: 1856 in New York City, United States
- Key people: J. H. Winchester; Winchester Noyes; J. Barston Smull

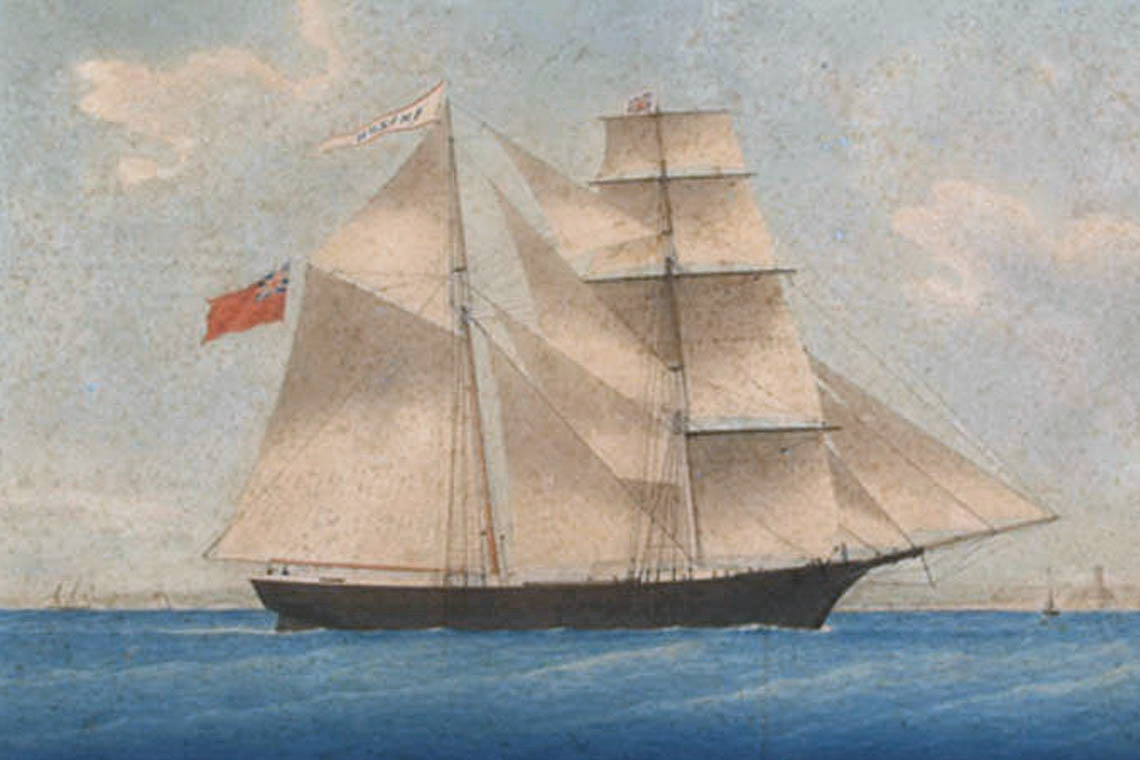
An 1861 painting of Mary Celeste (named Amazon at the time), by an unknown artist

J. H. Winchester & Company was founded by James Henry Winchester (1824–1913) in New York City in 1856 (incorporated in 1913). J. H. Winchester & Company was a cargo agent for the United States Shipping Board post World War I, in the 1920s. Winchester raised and born in Annapolis, Nova Scotia, Canada, on June 4, 1824. He moved to the United States in 1831 and settled in Eastport, Maine. Winchester completed the United States naturalized prossess on July 7, 1845, and became a US citizen. He moved to New York and became a ship captain. In New York became a partner in two brigantine sailing ships, one the Mary Celeste. The Mary Celeste was found hastily abandoned in 1872 between the Azores and Portugal. The abandonment is still a mystery today.

James Henry Winchester died in 1913 and Winchester Noyes became the J. H. Winchester & Company president. Noyes was born in Brooklyn on March 14, 1878. He became an ensign in the United States Navy on April 3, 1917, and departed the Navy in 1918. He ran the J. H. Winchester & Company during World War II and died in 1954.

J. Barston Smull joined J. H. Winchester & Company in 1907 a vice president, be was the vice president of the Emergency Fleet Corporation.

== World War II ==
J. H. Winchester & Company fleet of ships were used to help the World War II effort. During World War II J. H. Winchester & Company operated Merchant navy ships for the United States Shipping Board. During World War II J. H. Winchester & Company was active with charter shipping with the Maritime Commission and War Shipping Administration. J. H. Winchester & Company operated Liberty ships and Victory ships for the merchant navy. The ship was run by its J. H. Winchester & Company crew and the US Navy supplied United States Navy Armed Guards to man the deck guns and radio.

== Ships ==
=== Ships ===
- SS Yaklok

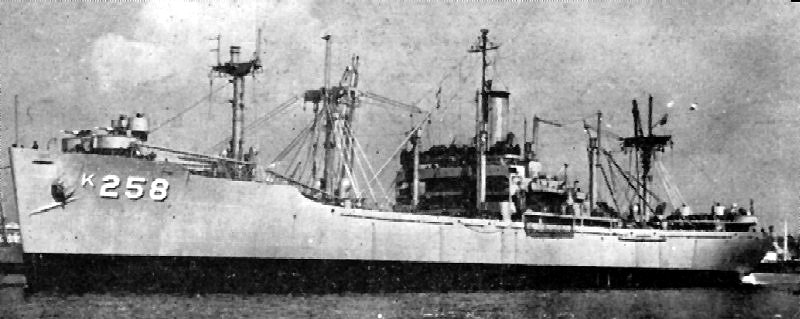
A Victory ship of World War II

Liberty ship of World War II

=== Liberty ships operated for World War II ===
- J. H. Daniel Carroll
- Barbara Frietchie
- Telfair Stockton
- Joel Chandler Harris *
- John Bell 27.8.43 Torpedoed and sunk by U.410 off Sardinia at 37.15N 08.24E
- Alexander Mitchell
- Andreas Honcharenko
- William L. Yancey
- William H. Kendrick
- Gus W. Darnell 23.11.44 Damaged by Japanese air attack off Samar Island, Philippines. CTL.
- James J. O'Kelly
- SS T. A. Johnston
- SS Ransom A. Moore
- SS Charles H. Marshall
- SS William A. Graham

=== Victory ships operated ===
- SS Bowling Green Victory
- Marshall Victory
- Petersburg Victory
- Winchester Victory
- Haverford Victory
  - Crater-class cargo ship:
- USS Adhara

=== Post war Liberty ships ===
- Julian W. Mack *
- Charles H. Marshall

== See also ==
- World War II United States Merchant Navy
- Frederic L. Chapin
