= 4-H Shooting Sports Programs =

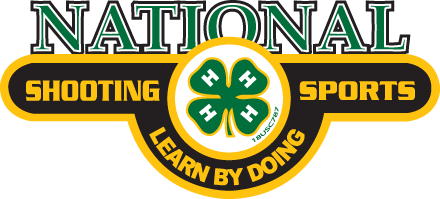
- National 4-H Shooting Sports Logo
- Formation: c. 1902, United States
- Type: Youth organization
- Legal status: Non-profit organization
- Purpose: "Engaging youth to reach their fullest potential while advancing the field of youth development."
- Headquarters: Washington, D.C.
- Region served: Worldwide
- Members: 6.5 million members in the United States, ages 5 to 19
- Main organ: National Institute of Food and Agriculture (NIFA)
- Parent organization: United States Department of Agriculture (USDA)
- Website: 4-hshootingsports.org

4-H Safety Education in Shooting Sports Programs are part of 4-H in the United States, a youth organization administered by the National Institute of Food and Agriculture of the United States Department of Agriculture (USDA), with the mission of "engaging youth to reach their fullest potential while advancing the field of youth development." The name represents four personal development areas of focus for the organization: head, heart, hands, and health.

== 4-H program ==
The 4-H organization has over 6.5 million members in the United States, from ages eight to eighteen, in approximately 90,000 clubs.

== Shooting Sports ==
4-H Safety Education in Shooting Sports programs are run by trained and certified volunteers. Any adult over the age of 18 may become a certified volunteer to run or assist in a safety education shooting sports program. Youth over the age of 16 may be certified to participate as a Youth Leader.

To begin a 4-H shooting sports program, an adult contacts their Extension and Outreach service to locate a training program in their area to get certified. Training programs are often weekend events staffed by unpaid volunteers. Room and board are often provided and included in the cost for the training which is nominal. The weekend program is divided into multiple segments. The core of the program is youth development. The first part of the program, a volunteer must demonstrate proficiency to his or her instructor within the chosen discipline. This is followed by training in youth development. Students then divide up and demonstrate their training skills by training other students and receive their certificates. To run a program all volunteers must register and participate in orientation with their Extension Educator.

== Youth Development ==
Students in school grades 4 through 12 are welcome to participate. Age is less important than maturity, the ability to follow rules, and the motor skills to handle a firearm or bow safely.

The 4-H slogan is "Learn by doing". Students are given a period of classroom training followed by hands on training. As students develop skills they are encouraged to assist younger students as coaches. This allows students to develop skills and confidence leading to true self-esteem. Not all students will excel academically nor will they excel athletically, shooting sports is one area where size, physical strength and memorization skills are not necessary to achieve excellence.

== Venues ==
While 4-H provides the education, training, and support to start a program, many programs are run and financed through local gun clubs. Gun clubs often provide ranges, rifles, bows, targets, arrows and ammunition for the program. Many clubs are looking for qualified people to run a youth shooting sports program.

== Safety ==
Knowledge of and practice of safe handling of bows and firearms is a primary concern of 4-H Safety Education in Shooting Sports. Students are drilled in safe handling procedures and are encouraged to develop at their own pace. Students learn valuable life skills about Firearm Safety that they can take forward with them into their adult lives.
