= Wisconsin Crop Improvement Association =

The Wisconsin Crop Improvement Association (WCIA), initially called the Wisconsin Experiment Association, was organized in 1901 by Ransom Asa Moore at the University of Wisconsin–Madison College of Agriculture, with the help of farmers and graduates of the Long and Short Course as means to improve and disseminate seeds and in 1919 led to the development of the International Crop Improvement Association, now called the Association of Official Seed Certifying Agencies (AOSCA).

The Wisconsin Crop Improvement Association is currently responsible for seed certification throughout Wisconsin by providing third party inspection, interviewing, and seed testing services and continues to collaborate in both the public and private sectors throughout cultivar development, evaluation, and commercialization and is currently located in the Wisconsin Crop Innovation Center of the University of Wisconsin–Madison in Middleton, Wisconsin.
