= SS William A. Graham =

Liberty ship of WWII

- A Liberty ship at sea

History

United States
- Name: William A. Graham
- Namesake: William Alexander Graham
- Builder: North Carolina Shipbuilding Company, Wilmington, North Carolina
- Yard number: 16
- Way number: 4
- Laid down: 1 June 1942
- Launched: 26 July 1942
- Completed: 15 August 1942
- In service: 1942
- Out of service: 1952
- Fate: Scrapped, 1972

General characteristics
- Class & type: Type EC2-S-C1 Liberty ship
- Displacement: 14,245 long tons (14,474 t)
- Length: 441 ft 6 in (134.57 m) o/a; 417 ft 9 in (127.33 m) p/p; 427 ft (130 m) w/l
- Beam: 57 ft (17 m)
- Draft: 27 ft 9 in (8.46 m)
- Propulsion: Two oil-fired boilers; Triple-expansion steam engine; 2,500 hp (1,900 kW); Single screw
- Speed: 11 knots (20 km/h; 13 mph)
- Range: 20,000 nmi (37,000 km; 23,000 mi)
- Capacity: 10,856 t (10,685 long tons) deadweight (DWT)
- Crew: 81
- Armament: Stern-mounted 4 in (100 mm) deck gun; Variety of anti-aircraft guns

SS William A. Graham (MC hull number 160) was a Liberty ship built by the North Carolina Shipbuilding Company of Wilmington, North Carolina, and launched on 26 July 1942. One of over 2,700 cargo ships produced during an emergency shipbuilding program, William A. Graham was named for William Alexander Graham, a 19th-century governor of North Carolina and a U.S. Secretary of the Navy.

Constructed in eight weeks, the 441-foot steamship was operated by J. H. Winchester & Company. of New York. On her maiden voyage carrying Lend-Lease supplies to Karachi, William A. Graham narrowly evaded a wolf pack of German submarines off Cape Town in October 1942. The ship had a second close encounter with the enemy in June 1944, when German bombers attacked the harbor at Anzio where William A. Graham lay at anchor with six other merchantmen.

A record of William A. Graham's maiden voyage is preserved in the diary of the ship’s first assistant engineer, Everett S. Ransom. Copies of the diary have been donated to nearly 30 libraries and museums around the United States, including the Lower Cape Fear Historical Society, the North Carolina Collection at UNC-Chapel Hill, and the Nimitz Library of the United States Naval Academy.

After the war, William A. Graham carried cargo under different operators until being mothballed in 1952 in a reserve fleet in Mobile, Alabama. In 1972, the ship was purchased for scrap and dismantled by the Union Minerals and Alloys Corporation.

== See also ==
- List of Liberty ships (S–Z)
