= Association of Official Seed Certifying Agencies =

American trade organization

The Association of Official Seed Certifying Agencies (AOSCA), formerly known as the International Crop Improvement Association, is a trade organization based in the United States. Founded in 1919, its function is to develop and promote certified varieties of seed for agricultural use.

== History ==
The International Crop Improvement Association evolved from the Wisconsin Crop Improvement Association (WCIA), initially called the Wisconsin Experiment Association. This was organized in 1901 by Ransom Asa Moore at the University of Wisconsin–Madison College of Agriculture, aided by graduates of that college and farmers, with the objective of improving and disseminating strains of seed. The establishment of the International Crop Improvement Association followed in December 1919 when Moore presented a proposed constitution for the organization in Chicago, Illinois. It was proposed that the organization be international rather than national to allow Canada to be a member. Moore was named the first president of the organization in 1920.

== Functions ==
The Association of Official Seed Certifying Agencies (AOSCA) assists clients in the production, identification, distribution and promotion of certified classes of seed and other crop propagation materials. Its membership currently includes seed certifying agencies across the US, and member countries including Canada, Australia, New Zealand, South Africa, Argentina, Chile and Brazil. Its mission is "To promote and facilitate the movement of seed or plant products in local, national, and international markets through the coordinated efforts of official seed certification agencies acting to evaluate, document, and verify that a seed or plant product meets certain accepted standards."
