= USNS Lt. Raymond O. Beaudoin =

1945 troop transport ship

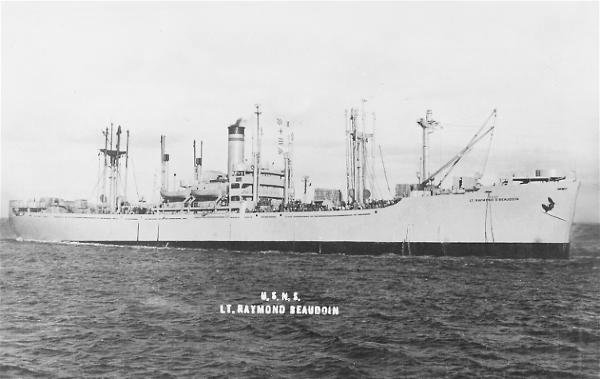
- USNS Lt. Raymond O. Beaudoin (T-AP-189)

History

United States
- Name: USNS Lt. Raymond O. Beaudoin (T-AP-189) (SS Marshall Victory)
- Namesake: Lt. Raymond O. Beaudoin, US Army Medal of Honor recipient
- Operator: J. H. Winchester & Company
- Builder: Bethlehem Steel, Fairfield yard
- Laid down: 4 April 1945
- Launched: 21 May 1945
- Sponsored by: Miss Helen V. Elsey
- Completed: 15 June 1945
- Acquired: (By the Navy): 22 July 1950
- In service: Commercial: 1945 - ?; Army: ? - 1950; MSTS: 1 Aug 1950 - Nov 1952
- Stricken: 22 December 1952
- Identification: MC hull type VC2-S-AP2, MC hull no. 823
- Honors and awards: Four battle stars for Korean War service
- Fate: Scrapped, 1972

General characteristics
- Displacement: 6,055 tons (lt), 10,680 t. (fl)
- Length: 455 ft
- Beam: 62 ft
- Draft: 29 ft
- Propulsion: Cross compound steam turbine, single screw, 8,500 shp
- Speed: 16 knots
- Troops: 1,203
- Complement: 50
- Armament: None

USNS Lt. Raymond O. Beaudoin (T-AP-189) was a troop transport that served with the United States Military Sea Transportation Service (MSTS) during the Korean War. Prior to her MSTS service, she served as a commercial vessel under the name SS Marshall Victory, and later with the US Army as USAT Lt. Raymond O. Beaudoin.

Laid down as the Victory ship SS Marshall Victory under Maritime Commission contract by Bethlehem‑Fairfield Shipyard, Inc of Baltimore, Maryland 4 April 1945, she was launched 21 May 1945; and delivered to her operator, J. H. Winchester & Company, 15 June 1945.

== Commercial and army service ==
Owned by the Maritime Administration, she served on the merchant sealanes and later with the Army Transportation Service primarily in the Pacific. She was transferred by the Maritime Administration to the Navy 22 July 1950 and placed in service 1 August 1950.

== MSTS service ==
Crewed by civilians, she operated under the control of MSTS and made supply runs and troop lifts between west coast ports and American bases in Japan and South Korea. From 20 April 1951 to 13 September 1952 she completed 20 deployments to Korean waters as a part of the vital seaborne supply line between Japan and Korea.

== Deactivation ==
She was returned to the custody of the Maritime Administration 5 November 1952 and was placed in the National Defense Reserve Fleet in Puget Sound, Olympia, Washington. Her name was struck from the Navy List 22 December 1952. The ship was scrapped in 1972.

== Awards ==
Lt. Raymond O. Beaudoin received four battle stars for service during the Korean War.
