= Gertrude L. Warren =

American government official and 4-H pioneer

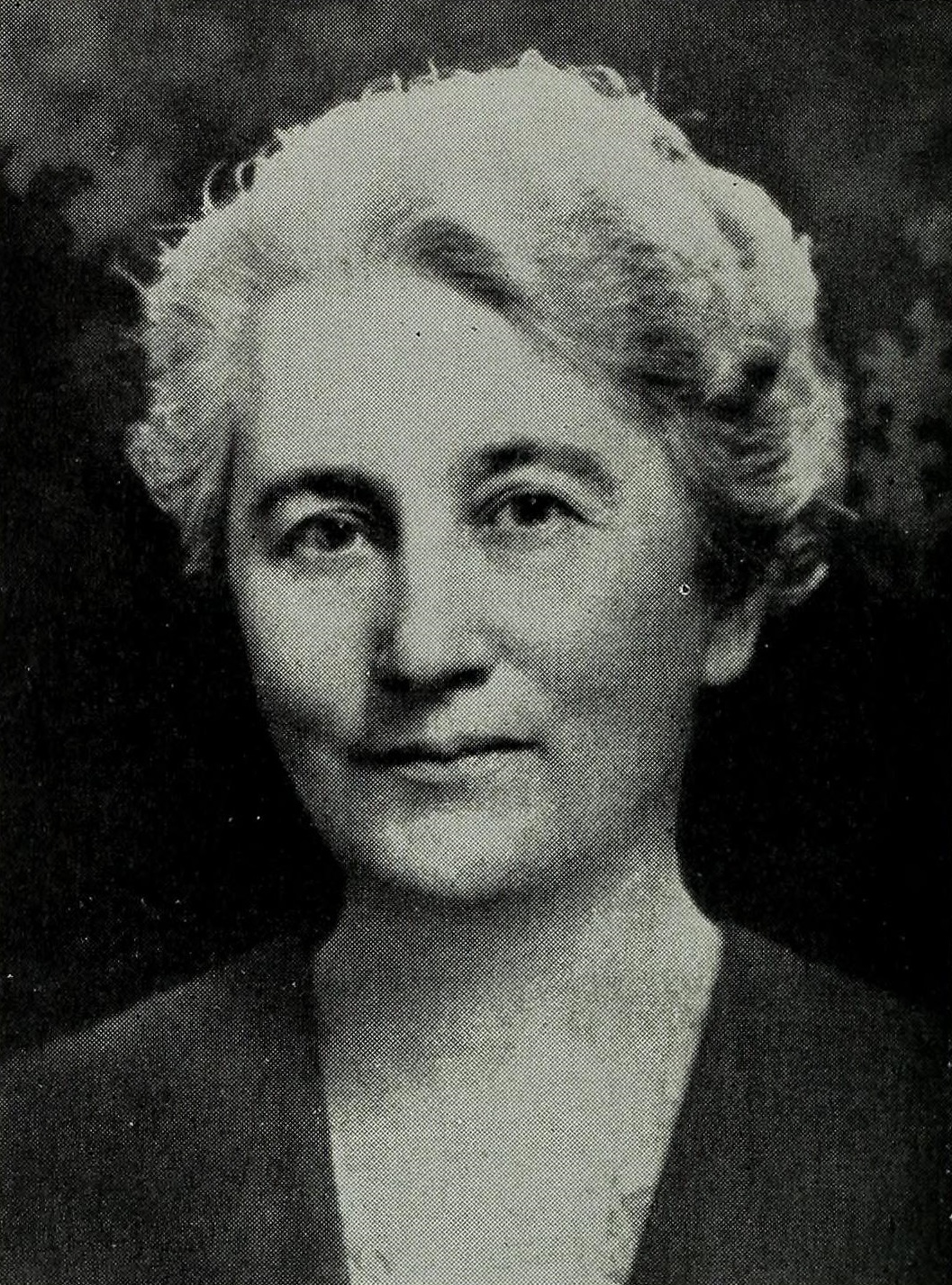
- Born: 1884; Lockport, New York
- Died: September 6, 1979; Washington, D.C.
- Education: Columbia University
- Known for: 4-H

Gertrude L. Warren (1884–1979) was an American government official and a pioneer in the 4-H movement.

== Early life and family ==
Gertrude L. Warren was born on a farm near Lockport, New York. She studied at Columbia University, from which she received bachelor's and master's degrees in home economics.

== Career ==
Warren taught home economics at Columbia until 1917, at which time she moved to Washington, D.C. to join the United States Department of Agriculture (USDA) as a senior scientist. She was placed in charge of the home-making element of a network of boys' and girls' clubs, organized under the Cooperative Extension Service. The first appearance of the term "4-H Club" in a federal document was in "Organization and Results of Boys' and Girls' Club Work," by Oscar Herman Benson (1875–1951) and Warren, in 1920. (The expression had been used in a speech by Benson as early as 1911.) Warren advocated for this name for the program; others proposed "Junior Extension Work," with reference to other federal programs. By 1924, the system was known as 4-H, for its emphasis on improving head, heart, hands, and health. When Warren joined USDA, membership in the clubs numbered 330,000; at her retirement in 1952, the system had grown to 85,000 clubs with 2 million members. Warren expanded the scope of girls' activities under the program (promoting garment making, room decorating, and hot lunches), and wrote extensive training materials.

Warren was instrumental in establishing the National 4-H Foundation (now the National 4-H Council) and the National 4-H Center in Washington. She initiated the International Four-H Youth Exchange. Warren was a member of the Commission on Child Welfare, established by Herbert Hoover; the Eighth Scientific Conference of the Americas; the Rural Education Conference for Franklin D. Roosevelt; and Harry S. Truman's National Youth Emergency Conference and Conference on Family Life. To sum up her career, she was called "the mother of 4-H" and "the guardian angel of 4-H."

Outside of government, Gertrude L. Warren was president of the Woman's National Farm & Garden Association from 1952 to 1954.

== Later life and death ==
Gertrude L. Warren died of cardiac arrest on 6 September 1979 at Sibley Memorial Hospital in Washington.

== Legacy and recognition ==
For her work in establishing 4-H Clubs in Latvia, Gertrude Warren (along with Ray A. Turner and C. B. Smith) was awarded the Order of the Three Stars, that country's highest civil order. At the National 4-H Conference Center in Chevy Chase, Maryland, the headquarters building was named Warren Hall in her honor.

== Selected publications ==
- Benson, Oscar Herman; Warren, Gertrude L. (February 1920). Organization and Results of Boys' and Girls' Club Work (Northern and Western States): 1918. Washington, DC: U.S. Department of Agriculture. Department Circular 66
- Warren, Gertrude L. (April 1936). The Cultural Aspects of 4-H Club Work. Washington, DC: U.S. Department of Agriculture, Extension Service. Extension Service Circular 241
- Warren, Gertrude L. (October 1938). Organization of 4-H Club Work: A Guide for Local Leaders. Washington, DC: U.S. Department of Agriculture. Miscellaneous Publication No. 320
- Warren, Gertrude L. (July 1951). Building a Better America through the 4-H Clubs. Washington, DC: U.S. Department of Agriculture, Extension Service. AIB 58
- Warren, Gertrude L. (December 1952). Aids for Observance of National 4-H Club Events. U.S. Department of Agriculture, Extension Service. PA-214

== Bibliography ==
- Nolan, Martha A. (1985). A Chronicle: The History of Woman's National Farm & Garden Association, Incorporated: 1914-1984. OCLC 924193250.
- Reck, Franklin A. (1951). The 4-H Story: A History of 4-H Club Work (PDF). Chicago, IL: National 4-H Service Committee. OCLC 950057521.
- Wessel, Thomas; Wessel, Marilyn (1982). 4-H: An American Idea, 1900-1980. Chevy Chase, MD: National 4-H Council. OCLC 8675452.
