= SS Yaklok =

History

United States
- Name: Yaklok
- Owner: USSB
- Operator: Pacific Steamship Co. (1919); J. H. Winchester & Co. (1920–1921)
- Ordered: 5 November 1917
- Builder: Seattle North Pacific Shipbuilding Co., Seattle
- Yard number: 2
- Laid down: 3 July 1918
- Launched: 31 October 1918
- Sponsored by: Miss Grace East
- Commissioned: 25 July 1919
- Maiden voyage: 12 August 1919
- Homeport: Seattle
- Identification: US Official Number 218164; Call sign LRHS
- Fate: Scrapped, 1930

General characteristics
- Type: Design 1015 ship
- Tonnage: 6,046 GRT; 4,426 NRT; 9,516 DWT
- Length: 401.9 ft (122.5 m)
- Beam: 53.1 ft (16.2 m)
- Draft: 26 ft 5 1/2 in (8.065 m) (loaded)
- Depth: 32.0 ft (9.8 m)
- Installed power: 2,800 shp
- Propulsion: Halliday Machinery Co. steam turbine, double reduction geared to one screw
- Speed: 11 knots (13 mph; 20 km/h)

Yaklok was a steam cargo ship built in 1918–1919 by Seattle North Pacific Shipbuilding Company of Seattle for the United States Shipping Board as part of the wartime shipbuilding program of the Emergency Fleet Corporation (EFC) to restore the nation's Merchant Marine. The vessel made several trips to Europe during the first two years of her career before being laid up in mid-1921 and eventually being broken up for scrap in 1930.

== Design and construction ==
After the United States entry into World War I, a large shipbuilding program was undertaken to restore and enhance shipping capabilities both of the United States and their Allies. As part of this program, EFC placed orders with nation's shipyards for a large number of vessels of standard designs. Design 1015 cargo ship was a standard cargo freighter of approximately 9,400 tons deadweight designed by Moore Shipbuilding Co. and adopted by USSB.

Yaklok was part of the order for ten vessels placed by USSB with Seattle North Pacific Shipbuilding Co. on 5 November 1917 and was laid down on 3 July 1918 and launched on 31 October 1918 (yard number 2), with Miss Grace East, a timekeeper working for the shipbuilder, being the sponsor. Due to the epidemic of influenza, the launching was only attended by the press and shipbuilder employees to prevent the spread of the disease.

The ship had two main decks as well as forecastle and poop deck and was built on the Isherwood principle of longitudinal framing providing extra strength to the body of the vessel. The freighter had four main holds and also possessed all the modern machinery for quick loading and unloading of cargo from five large hatches, including ten winches and a large number of derricks. She was also equipped with wireless apparatus, had submarine signal system installed and had electrical lights installed along the decks.

As built, the ship was 401.9 feet (122.5 m) long (between perpendiculars) and 53.1 feet (16.2 m) abeam, a depth of 32.0 feet (9.8 m). Yaklok was originally assessed at 6,046 GRT and 4,426 NRT and had deadweight of approximately 9,516. The vessel had a steel hull with double bottom throughout with exception of her machine compartment, and a single 2,800 shp steam turbine, double-reduction geared to a single screw propeller that moved the ship at up to 11 knots (13 mph; 20 km/h). The steam for the engine was supplied by three Foster Water Tubes fitted for both coal and oil fuel.

The sea trials were held on 16/17 July 1919 during which the steamer performed satisfactorily and was handed over to the Shipping Board a few days after their completion.

== Operational history ==
In June 1919 while the vessel was still under construction she was allocated to the Pacific Steamship Co. to transport a cargo of grain to Europe on behalf of the U.S. Grain Corporation. Following delivery to her operator, Yaklok sailed from Seattle and arrived at Portland on 3 August 1919 to take on board one of the last remaining loads of 1918 wheat crop. She departed Portland a week later bound for New York via Astoria carrying 283,804 bushels of wheat and after uneventful voyage reached Newport News on September 11. Following an established USSB policy the Shipping Board ship could only continue with cargo to Europe if an equivalent amount of cargo space would be allocated by a foreign shipping operator, otherwise the cargo had to be unloaded in one of Atlantic coast ports to be transhipped to Europe by a foreign vessel. After spending two weeks in Newport News Yaklok was given green light to proceed to Europe and left the Virginia port on October 2 bound for Naples. On October 9 Yaklok while approximately 300 nautical miles (560 km) east of New York and about 100 nautical miles (190 km) south of Cape Sable, became disabled after her boiler tubes had blown, and was forced to send a distress call asking for help. The call was received by a nearby ship SS Anacortes who was about 70 miles away. On hearing the news, the US Coast Guard also dispatched cutter Ossipee from Portsmouth on the same day. The cutter was able to reach the disabled freighter at about 03:00 on October 10 and took her into tow. After 29 hours both vessels safely reached Boston where Yaklok was put into drydock for repairs. Following completion of her engine work the freighter left Boston on October 22 continuing her trip to Italy. After reaching her destination and disembarking her cargo, Yaklok departed Naples at the end of November and reached New York on December 17, thus successfully concluding her maiden voyage.

Upon her return Yaklok was allocated to J. H. Winchester & Company and sailed from New York on her second journey on 1 February 1920 bound for Dunkirk and Antwerp with a cargo of rye. On February 5, while roughly 200 nautical miles (370 km) off Cape Sable, her high pressure turbine became disabled and she was again forced to send out a distress call requesting aid. She returned to New York on February 10 being towed by two tugs, Whiteash and W.F. Dalzell. Upon finishing her repairs the freighter departed New York ten days later and arrived at Antwerp on March 8.

The steamer conducted two more trips during her short career. In May 1920 the ship departed from Baltimore for Genoa carrying 8,000 tons of coal. Upon her return, she sailed again in September of the same year loaded with a cargo of general merchandise and produce bound for Buenos Aires and Rio de Janeiro. On her return trip she transported 7,960 tons of maize from South America to Bremen and Liverpool before finally returning to New York on 21 February 1921. The vessel remained berthed in New York harbor for the next four months before being officially laid up due to overabundance of tonnage and relocated to an anchorage off Prall's Island.

The vessel was eventually sold for breaking together with fifty nine other vessels in July 1930 to the Union Shipbuilding Company of Baltimore with her price being set at US$15,842. The ship was finally broken up in the 4th quarter of 1930.
