= International Four-H Youth Exchange =

Former international exchange program

The International Four-H Youth Exchange, or IFYE was an international exchange program supported and funded by the National 4-H Council up until 1992. In 1999 continued support and funding for the program was, "accepted", by the IFYE Association, and in 2012 IFYE officially changed its name to the, "IFYE Association of the USA, Inc."

== History ==
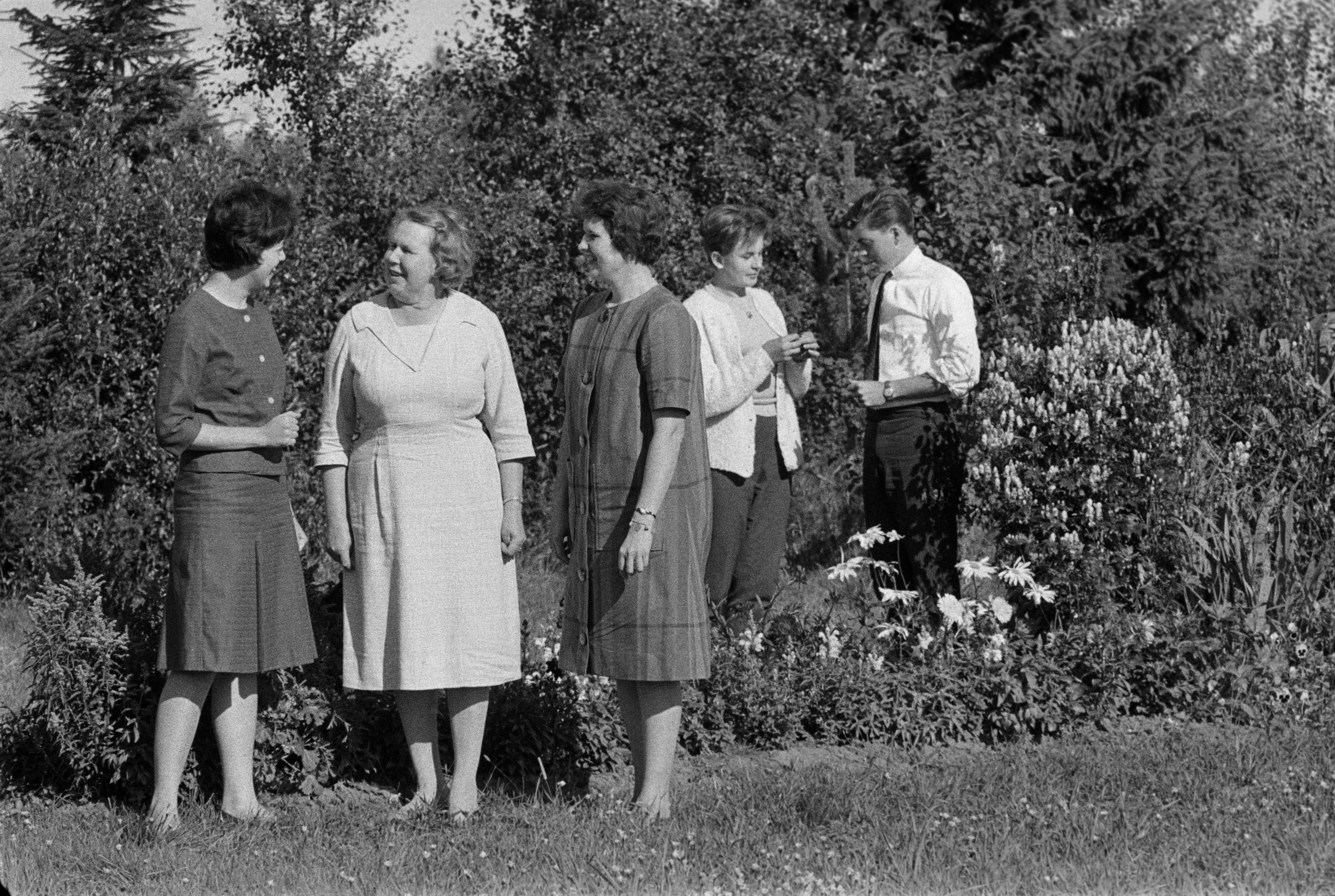
Americans from International Farm Youth Exchange program in Finland in 1962

At the end of World War II, 4-H teens attending a national 4-H conference asked themselves, "Why can't we solve our problems in a more humane way?" Thus, a two-way cultural exchange known as the International Farm Youth Exchange began in 1948 conducted by the National 4-H Council.

Gertrude L. Warren, of the United States Department of Agriculture, contributed organization and leadership.

In 1992 the National IFYE Association (composed of exchange alumni and others interested in promoting the International 4-H Exchanges) accepted the responsibilities to support the continued funding of these programs. Thus, the National IFYE Foundation was developed in 1996-97 with a Board of Directors and officers named in 1997. Recommendations for directors were received by the established regions of the IFYE Association at its annual conference in Savannah, Georgia in 1996. The first annual meeting of the board was held in St. Louis, Missouri on July 23, 1997.

Because of the IFYE, thousands of young people from all over the world have lived and worked on farms, small towns and cities of another country, sharing these one-in-a-lifetime experiences with thousands of people.

== Mission ==
The International Four-H Youth Exchange (IFYE) Association of the USA, Inc., in cooperation with the Cooperative Extension System, will

- promote world peace through exchange opportunities for mutual understanding,
- support and perpetuate the growth of 4-H International education and exchange programs,
- provide support to returning international exchange participants,
- provide financial assistance for exchanges through its affiliated IFYE Foundation of the USA,
- provide recognition to groups and individuals who further global awareness and inter-cultural understanding, and
- establish a network to further international understanding.
