= SS T. A. Johnston =

World War II Liberty ship of the United States

History

United States
- Name: T. A. Johnston
- Namesake: T. A. Johnston
- Owner: War Shipping Administration (WSA)
- Operator: J.H. Winchester & Company, Inc.
- Ordered: as type (EC2-S-C1) hull, MC hull 2304
- Builder: J.A. Jones Construction, Panama City, Florida
- Cost: $1,342,770
- Yard number: 45; 45R
- Way number: 6; 2
- Laid down: 22 April 1944; 14 November 1944
- Launched: 13 December 1944
- Completed: 28 December 1944
- Identification: Call Signal: WQEA
- Fate: Sold for scrapping, 10 July 1970
- Notes: Hull 45 was dismantled completely after being damaged by fire. Hull 45R was built to replace it in December 1944.

General characteristics
- Class & type: Liberty ship; type EC2-S-C1, standard
- Tonnage: 10,865 LT DWT; 7,176 GRT
- Displacement: 3,380 long tons (3,434 t) (light); 14,245 long tons (14,474 t) (max)
- Length: 441 feet 6 inches (135 m) oa; 416 feet (127 m) pp; 427 feet (130 m) lwl
- Beam: 57 feet (17 m)
- Draft: 27 ft 9.25 in (8.4646 m)
- Installed power: 2 × Oil fired 450 °F (232 °C) boilers, operating at 220 psi (1,500 kPa); 2,500 hp (1,900 kW)
- Propulsion: 1 × triple-expansion steam engine, (manufactured by Filer and Stowell, Milwaukee, Wisconsin); 1 × screw propeller
- Speed: 11.5 knots (21.3 km/h; 13.2 mph)
- Capacity: 562,608 cubic feet (15,931 m^{3}) (grain); 499,573 cubic feet (14,146 m^{3}) (bale)
- Complement: 38–62 USMM; 21–40 USNAG
- Armament: Varied by ship; Bow-mounted 3-inch (76 mm)/50-caliber gun; Stern-mounted 4-inch (102 mm)/50-caliber gun; 2–8 × single 20-millimeter (0.79 in) Oerlikon anti-aircraft (AA) cannons and/or, 2–8 × 37-millimeter (1.46 in) M1 AA guns

SS T. A. Johnston was a Liberty ship built in the United States during World War II. She was named after T. A. Johnston.

== Construction ==
T. A. Johnston was initially laid down on 22 April 1944, under a Maritime Commission (MARCOM) contract, MC hull 2304, by J.A. Jones Construction, Panama City, Florida. A fire on the slip way warped the original hull and it had to be scrapped. A new hull was laid down on 14 November 1944, and would go on to set a shipyard record of 29 days on the way when she was launched on 13 December 1944.

== History ==
She was allocated to J.H. Winchester & Company, Inc., on 28 December 1944. On 7 January 1947, she was laid up in the National Defense Reserve Fleet, in the Hudson River Group. On 19 July 1955, she was withdrawn from the fleet to be loaded with grain as part of the "Grain Program 1955". She returned to the fleet on 4 August 1955, full of grain. On 22 April 1956, she was withdrawn to unload, she returned empty on 28 April 1956. On 4 August 1956, she was withdrawn for the last time to be loaded with grain, she returned full on 25 August 1956. She was withdrawn on May 18 1963, to be emptied and returned 25 May 1963. On 10 July 1970, she was sold, along with one other ship, for $80,323.08 to Union Minerals and Alloys Corporation, to be scrapped. She was removed from the fleet on 6 October 1970.

== Bibliography ==
- "Jones Construction, Panama City FL". www.ShipbuildingHistory.com. 13 October 2010.
- "Liberty Ships – World War II".
- Maritime Administration. "T. A. Johnston". Ship History Database Vessel Status Card. U.S. Department of Transportation, Maritime Administration. Archived from the original on 12 December 2019.
- Davies, James (May 2004). "Specifications (As-Built)" (PDF). p. 23.
- "SS T. A. Johnston ".
