= Alison Nordström =

American photography curator and historian

- Born: Alison Devine Nordström; 1950 (age 75–76); Boston, Massachusetts, U.S.
- Education: University of Oklahoma; The Union Institute
- Occupations: Curator, writer, historian of photography
- Known for: Founding director, Southeast Museum of Photography; senior curator of photographs, George Eastman House; co-curator of the New Topographics restaging
- Awards: Focus Award for Lifetime Achievement in Photography, Griffin Museum of Photography (2011)

Alison Devine Nordström (born 1950) is an independent writer, curator, and historian of photography. She was the founding director of Florida's Southeast Museum of Photography in 1991 and, from 2004 to 2013, senior curator of photographs at George Eastman House in Rochester, New York. While at George Eastman House she co-curated, with Britt Salvesen, the touring restaging of the landmark 1975 exhibition New Topographics: Photographs of a Man-Altered Landscape.

== Early life and education ==
Alison Nordström was born in Boston in 1950. She holds a bachelor's degree in English literature. She earned a master's degree in museum studies (a Master of Library Science with a museum emphasis) from the University of Oklahoma, with a thesis titled "Images of Paradise: Photography in Samoa 1880–1930", and a PhD in cultural and visual studies from The Union Institute in Cincinnati. Earlier in her career she taught English as a second language in Canada, Lebanon, and Japan, and was an instructor in the history of photography and the history of cinema at Vermont Community College.

== Career ==
Early in her career, Nordström was executive director of the Robert Flaherty Centennial Project and, for five years, of the Brattleboro Museum and Art Center, both in Brattleboro, Vermont.

=== Southeast Museum of Photography ===
Nordström was the founding director and senior curator of the Southeast Museum of Photography in Florida from 1991 to 2002. Based on the campus of Daytona Beach Community College, she developed the museum's mission and built up its permanent collection. She resigned in late 2001 after a disagreement with the college administration over a proposed exhibition and acquisition committee and over programming following the September 11 attacks; the departure drew local and national press coverage, some of which framed it as censorship, a characterization Nordström herself declined, instead describing it as a loss of academic freedom. Among the programs she originated there was the biennial exhibition series Fresh Work.

=== George Eastman House ===
From 2004 to 2013 she was senior curator of photographs and director of exhibitions at George Eastman House in Rochester, New York, becoming the museum's curator-at-large in 2013. While there she curated more than 35 exhibitions drawn from the museum's collection. Around the time of her arrival she described herself as a generalist and as a "consumer" of photography rather than a practitioner, saying her main interest lay in what happens to photographs after they are made. As senior curator she led a six-part documentary video series on historic photographic processes, produced for the museum's exhibition See: Untold Stories, presenting the development of photography from the daguerreotype to the gelatin silver print.

=== Independent work and Photo Soup ===
Nordström is a museum research associate at Harvard University and a director of Photo Soup, an annual multi-day symposium and publication project for people working in photography. One such gathering, Photo Soup 2022, brought together six photography practitioners for three days at a repurposed sugarhouse in Rockingham, Vermont, with support from the Streamway Foundation Trust; organized by Nordström and Diana Stoll, it resulted in a published volume of conversations.

In September 2018, Nordström took part in a panel discussion at the Museum of Modern Art in New York devoted to the photography critic A. D. Coleman, appearing alongside the critic Bill Kouwenhoven, MoMA curator Sarah Meister, and the writer Omar Willey, in a program convened by MoMA curator Roxana Marcoci.

=== Editing and festival roles ===
Nordström was a founding co-editor of the journal Photography and Culture, launched in 2008 and published by Berg, working alongside co-editors Kathy Kubicki and Val Williams; she served as an editor from 2007 to 2010. She was also artistic director of Fotofestiwal Łódź (Łódź, Poland) from 2015 to 2016.

=== Teaching ===
Nordström helped establish the Master of Arts program in Photographic Preservation and Collections Management, a joint degree program of George Eastman House and Ryerson University, and served as its program director. She has also been a visiting scholar in the graduate department of photography at Lesley University in Cambridge, Massachusetts.

== Curation ==
Nordström's curatorial work has involved photographers and institutions in Europe, Asia, and the Americas. While at George Eastman House she co-curated, with Britt Salvesen, the touring re-creation of the landmark 1975 exhibition New Topographics: Photographs of a Man-Altered Landscape, organized jointly by George Eastman House and the Center for Creative Photography at the University of Arizona; it opened in 2009 and travelled to venues including the Los Angeles County Museum of Art, the San Francisco Museum of Modern Art, and several European museums. In 2013 her exhibition Lewis Hine was shown at the International Center of Photography in New York, presenting about 175 prints spanning the career of the documentary photographer Lewis Hine, drawn from the collections of George Eastman House, where Nordström was then photography curator at large. Organized by George Eastman House, the exhibition toured Europe between 2011 and 2013, with presentations at the Fondation Henri Cartier-Bresson in Paris (2011), the Fundación Mapfre in Madrid (2012), and the Nederlands Fotomuseum in Rotterdam (2012 to 2013), and was accompanied by a catalogue featuring her essay on Hine.

=== Selected exhibitions ===
Selected exhibitions curated by Nordström include:

- 1995: Picturing Paradise: Colonial Photography of Samoa, 1875–1925 (Southeast Museum of Photography; also shown at the Pitt Rivers Museum, Oxford, the Rautenstrauch-Joest Museum, Cologne, and the Metropolitan Museum of Art, New York)
- 1997: Telling Our Own Stories: Florida's Family Photographs (Southeast Museum of Photography; co-curated with Casey Blanton)
- 2000: Voyages (per)Formed: Photography and Travel in the Gilded Age (Southeast Museum of Photography; based on her doctoral dissertation)
- 2006: Why Look at Animals? (George Eastman House)
- 2007: Found: Photographs by Gerald Slota (George Eastman House)
- c. 2007: Paris: Photographs by Eugène Atget and Christopher Rauschenberg (George Eastman House and the International Center of Photography)
- 2008 to 2011: Truth/Beauty: Pictorialism and the Photograph as Art, 1845–1945 (organized with the Vancouver Art Gallery; shown at George Eastman House in 2009 and at The Phillips Collection, Washington, D.C., in 2010 to 2011)
- 2009 to 2012: New Topographics: Photographs of a Man-Altered Landscape (co-curated with Britt Salvesen; touring)
- 2011 to 2013: Lewis Hine (organized by George Eastman House; toured to the Fondation Henri Cartier-Bresson, Paris, the Fundación Mapfre, Madrid, the Nederlands Fotomuseum, Rotterdam, and the International Center of Photography, New York)
- c. 2010: Ideas in Things: Photography and Materiality (George Eastman House)
- 2012: Kodak Coloramas (New York Transit Museum Gallery Annex, Grand Central Terminal, New York)
- 2020 to 2022: Findings: Torben Eskerod (Fotografie Forum Frankfurt; first shown in 2020 to 2021 and relaunched in 2022)

== Writing and scholarship ==
Nordström has written numerous books and essays on photographic topics. Her catalogue essay for the 2013 Lewis Hine exhibition discussed Hine's working methods, including his reuse and staging of images.

== Selected publications ==
=== Books and catalogues ===
- 1997: Nordström, Alison; Blanton, Casey (1997). Telling Our Own Stories: Florida's Family Photographs. Daytona Beach, Florida: Southeast Museum of Photography. ISBN 9781887040228. OCLC 37960295.
- 2008: Nordström, Alison; Ackerman, J. Luca (2008). TruthBeauty: Pictorialism and the Photograph as Art, 1845-1945. Vancouver: Vancouver Art Gallery / Douglas & McIntyre. ISBN 9781553652946. OCLC 178989555.
- 2009: Salvesen, Britt; Nordström, Alison, eds. (2009). New Topographics. Göttingen / Tucson / Rochester: Steidl; Center for Creative Photography; George Eastman House International Museum of Photography and Film. ISBN 9783865218278. OCLC 416286097.
- 2021: Nordström, Alison Devine; Hyldelund, Susanne (2021). Findings: Torben Eskerod. Frankfurt: Fotografie Forum Frankfurt. OCLC 1253774732.
- 2023: Nordström, Alison Devine; Stoll, Diana C., eds. (2023). Photo Soup 2022: Conversations About Photography. Rockingham, Vermont: Streamway Foundation Trust. ISBN 9798988958703. OCLC 1431004616.
- 2024: Nordström, Alison Devine; Stoll, Diana C., eds. (2024). Photo Soup 2: Enterprise: Conversations About Photography. Windham County, Vermont: Streamway Foundation Trust. OCLC 1560064296.
- 2025: Nordström, Alison Devine; Stoll, Diana C., eds. (2025). Photo Soup 3: Education: Conversations About Photography. Windham County, Vermont: Streamway Foundation Trust. ISBN 9798988958727. OCLC 1566318857.

=== Selected essays and contributions ===
- Nordström, Alison Devine (1991). "Early Photography in Samoa: Marketing Stereotypes of Paradise". History of Photography. 15 (4): 272–286. doi:10.1080/03087298.1991.10442504.
- Schwartz, Dona. In the Kitchen. Texts by Alison Devine Nordström and Marion Winik. [Confirm publisher, year, and ISBN; reviewed in Gastronomica in 2011.]
- Nordström, Alison (2012). "Lewis Hine". Lewis Hine: From the Collections of George Eastman House, International Museum of Photography and Film. New York: D.A.P./Distributed Art Publishers. ISBN 9781935202769. OCLC 754105561.

== Awards and honors ==
In 2011, Nordström received the Focus Award for Lifetime Achievement in Photography from the Griffin Museum of Photography in Boston, and the Apple Valley Foundation Award for Curatorial Excellence. She has also held a Robert Rauschenberg Fellowship in Critical Writing.
