= Ransom Asa Moore =

Professor Ransom Asa Moore
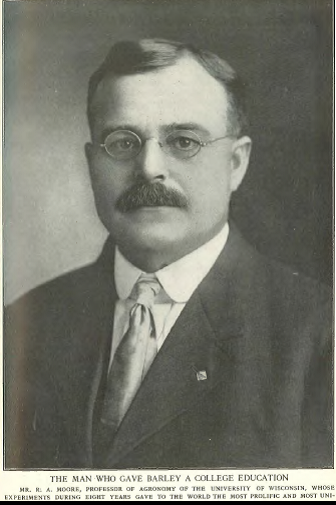
- Ransom Asa Moore
- Born: June 5, 1861; Kewaunee County, Wisconsin United States
- Died: February 26, 1941 (aged 79); Madison, Wisconsin, United States
- Scientific career
- Fields: Stonemason; Agriculture; Education; Farm Book-keeping; Parliamentary Procedure and Organization of Farmers; Farm Crops, or Agronomy
- Institutions: University of Wisconsin-Madison

Professor Ransom Asa Moore was an agronomist and professor at the University of Wisconsin-Madison. He was born 1861 in Kewaunee County, Wisconsin and died in 1941 in Madison, Wisconsin. He has been called "Father of Wisconsin 4-H", the builder and "Daddy" of the Agriculture Short Course Program, and the Father of the Agronomy Department at the University of Wisconsin-Madison College of Agriculture.

== Parents ==
From the early 1800s, the Moore family was known for moving on when the area in which they lived became too civilized, preferring as many farmers did, to live on the frontier. R. A. Moore's grandfather Seth Moore, a descendant of the original colonists (his father, Joseph, served under and was a bodyguard to General George Washington,) migrated to Ohio in 1826 and staked a claim on land that now lies near the center of the great city of Cleveland. It was here that he farmed and his nine children were born, including Ransom Moore's father, Seth Jr. The country was settled rapidly, which interfered with his trapping, so Seth sold his farm for the magnificent sum of $4600, which at that time was considered one of the best sales of farm lands that had occurred in that region. He then moved on to the newly formed Wisconsin Territory in 1842.

Moore's father was Seth Moore, Jr. born April 10, 1835, in Avon, Ohio in Lorain County, Ohio. When Seth Jr. was around seven years of age, the Moore family moved to Wisconsin. According to the census, Seth Moore, Jr., like his father, was a farmer who liked to fish, hunt, and trap. Seth was a sailor on the rambler with Captain Wheeler, around 1855 he operated a saw mill, and between 1870 and 1900 his occupation was listed as a farmer. Seth Moore Jr. married Johanna Werner on October 19, 1858, in Cortville, Kewaunee, Wisconsin when she was 15 years of age. Johanna was born on March 15, 1843, in Mecklenburg-Schwerin, Germany and her family came to Chicago around 1850. Her parents, and possibly other siblings, died in 1854 during a cholera epidemic in Chicago when she was approximately 11 years of age. Her sister, Louisa K.S. Werner, a few years older than her, survived as well and later married Seth's brother, Joseph Moore, on October 5, 1858, a few weeks before Seth and Johanna were married. Seth and Johanna had settled around Kewaunee, Wisconsin and the Census showed they had 15–16 children, although many other credible sources, including Ransom's, state they had eleven children. In 1853, they purchased approximately 300 acres of land, including the Ojibwe village of Kewaunee.

== Childhood ==
Moore was born June 5, 1861, as the second child of Seth and Johanna Moore, on an undeveloped farm near the locality known as the Foot-bridge community, west of Kewaunee, Wisconsin, near the present-day Bruemmer-Kewaunee County Park. As a youth, and being the eldest son, Ransom helped his father continue clearing the forest in order to develop their quarry, consequentially adding more farm land. Ransom spent time hunting, fishing, sugar bushing for maple syrup, and trapping, like his father and grandfather before him. To a great extent, the family's subsistence needs were filled by means of hunting, though they did grow crops and sold any surplus. During the winter months, Ransom trapped for furs and would hike approximately 32 miles to a Green Bay, Wisconsin trading post to sell them. There are amazing first-hand accounts written by Moore in the “Hoard's Dairyman” in the late 1920s, regarding his pioneer childhood. However, the majority of the Moore family income was derived from the lime-kiln and quarry.

When Ransom was thirteen years of age, due to his father's illness, being an invalid at this point according to the Census, Ransom had to sacrifice more of his schooling to manage the farm and kiln. The successful limestone quarry operated from early spring until late fall, utilizing hired laborers for clearing of the land, and it follows that an increased managing role in his father's absence would have encompassed organizing these workers, possibly preparing him for his later pivotal role at the University of Wisconsin-Madison. During this time, T.C. Chamberlin had camped near the Moore farm to study the rock formations during his geological studies preceding his presidency of the University of Wisconsin-Madison. Generally, the local quarry is an excellent site to get a good understanding of the rocks in the area. While doing so, Chamberlin took note of Ransom studying between the short time intervals that occurred while firing the lime kiln and encouraged the youthful Ransom Moore to continue his studies. Given the entirety of his situation, Ransom's time in the local country school was limited. Some sources indicate he attended school six months each year while other sources indicate he only attended a few weeks each winter which summed up to a total of six months of education.

Moore wrote, “We lived where the Niagara limestone jutted out and engaged in burning lime and quarrying. The stone from Moore’s quarry built the first stone bridges across the Kewaunee River, besides hundreds of stone basements under farm and other buildings...[N]early all of the lime used in the city of Kewaunee was taken from the kilns operated by my father and myself."

== Early careers ==
When Moore was about 21 years of age, altering the path of his life, a huge stone in the farm quarry fell against him and injured his back so seriously that he had to consider a less physical career. When the Kewaunee County Superintendent's Office announced a teacher's examination in the spring of 1881, he decided to try for the certificate. Although his schooling had been limited to a few weeks each winter in the district school, his home studies enabled him to pass a teacher's examination in 1882. He began teaching in his home district, but continued to hunt and trap for furs, which greatly supplemented his meager earnings. The first school he taught at was the Footbridge School near his birthplace. From 1884 to 1887, Moore studied at the Oshkosh Normal School, or Oshkosh State Teachers’ College, during intervals, in order to keep pace with education. After eight years of teaching, and insistence of other teachers in the county, Moore ran for and was elected Superintendent of Schools in Kewaunee County around 1889, a position Moore held for six years.

Around this time, Moore met Mary Janette Rogers “Nettie” in Carlton, Wisconsin, daughter of Judge Williams, a judge of the Circuit Court, and Jane (Powers) Rogers. They were married July 17, 1889. Not long after, they had their first of two sons, George Elkington Moore on April 26, 1890. On May 28, 1891, Moore's mother, Johanna, died at 48 years of age, but her influence on Moore is never directly mentioned.

=== 4-H and fairs ===
In 1891, farmers and residents in the county appointed Moore as the president of the Kewaunee Fair and the Agricultural Society, which was responsible for improving the Kewaunee County Fair which was in the “red.” As Moore worked diligently to enhance the schools, inspecting every single school and class, putting libraries in all but three districts, systematically organizing the course of study, implementing a grading system and standard to follow, he immediately organized a “youth movement”, which he called “Young People’s Contest Clubs” soliciting the support of young farm folks, the 6,000 pupils who were enrolled in this work, to exhibit at the Fair. This was one of the first mentions of the great movement then known as the young people's contest clubs that developed into the nationally known 4-H clubs. From the Ahnapee Record on April 7, 1892, Moore wrote:

"In order to promote the general interests of education and create emulation and activity in the different schools throughout the county, a cash prize and diploma is offered by the Kewaunee County Agricultural Society to the district producing the best educational work for exhibit at the annual fair held in Sept. 1892. The diploma will contain the name of the teacher under whom the school was instructed, also the names of the school officers and each shall receive a copy, and the cash prize shall go for the general benefit of the district.
"Now, I earnestly request each teacher of the county to compete for the prize and let your district be represented with its educational work at our next annual fair. If you should not teach again in the district deliver over the exhibit to the clerk of your school who will see that it is properly delivered and placed on exhibition.
"Hoping that every teacher in the county will begin at once treasuring up those educational works and inspire his pupils to put forth their best efforts to get a fine educational display, I remain.

"Respectfully yours,
"R.A. Moore, Supt. of Schools”

Moore's tactic worked phenomenally and Moore and the Agricultural Society were praised. Newspapers from 1892 and then 1893 reported significant increases in attendance and commented about the growing quantity and quality of exhibits pertaining to fruits, vegetables, livestock, etc., and commented about the vast improvements of the overall quality of the fair.

An excerpt from The New Era printed on October 3, 1894, gives a general idea of how Moore and his charisma were viewed:

"Mr. R.A. Moore has been appointed as one of the board of visitors to the new state Normal school at Stevens Point, by State Supt. Wells. It will please the people of our county to know that our county superintendent is looked upon as one of the foremost of educators in our state. Mr. Moore has always given his personal attention to the interests of our public schools, not only for the reason that he has a natural love for his work. Owing to Mr. Moore’s energy and work, the public schools of Kewaunee are now known to be among the best the state affords, as regards education."

== University of Wisconsin-Madison Career ==
In 1895, Moore was hired to build the University of Wisconsin-Madison, College of Agriculture, Agriculture Short Course Program. Moore was in charge of the Short Course program, he taught Farm Book-keeping, and he organized and taught The Short Course Literary Society and Parliamentary Procedures. "I had to go out and bring in students to the short course," said Prof. Moore, "I went from farm to farm with a horse and buggy to tell about our plans for farm boys, and I often went to local fairs with a tent and exhibit to show what the course had to offer. I had a bicycle, too, and if the roads' were too muddy I went around on foot." Moore, in a city known for its bicycle culture, Madison, Wisconsin, was probably one of the first, riding around town and farm to farm, to begin this trend still going strong today. This is a tradition that attendants and organizers of Wisconsin bicycling events, such as Bike the Barns and Ride to Farm, still participate in.

In 1897, in the interests of the short course and while studying the conditions of oat smut, Moore witnessed a novel new wheat breeding experiment being conducted the University of Minnesota Professor Willet M. Hayes. Moore brought this technique back to the University of Wisconsin, and without any funding, just the use of a disease infested plot that was growing sugar beets where the current Stock Pavilion is located, Moore began applying this technique to several different crops in an effort to improve Wisconsin Agriculture.

After his seed breeding program was a success and began expanding, Moore was promoted to assistant professor from 1903 to 1905 and chairman of the Agronomy Department at the UW-Madison, and by the end of 1905, Moore was noted as Professor R.A. Moore. Initially he stopped teaching the Book-keeping Course and began teaching Farm Crops and a Corn Study Course, which in a few years was titled the Agronomy Course. Moore, the builder and “daddy” of the Short Course program, the father of the Agronomy Department, and the father of Wisconsin 4-H, first had Moore Hall dedicated to him in 1931; he received an honorary degree from UW-Madison in 1933, and he retired on February 16, 1936.

=== Programs to improve and disseminate crop seeds ===
After starting his seed improvement programs in 1898, in five or six years, his efforts were realized in the perfection of some then prominent varieties of corn such as Golden Glow, Wisconsin No. 12, Silver King, Wisconsin No. 7, Wisconsin No. 8, and Murdock Yellow Dent. He had about 500 bushels of corn which he wanted to distribute among farmers, but had to develop means to do this, and to further improve the crops. Moore created two channels to do this: He founded the Wisconsin Experiment Association in 1901 in which he used UW-Madison College of Agriculture Long and Short Course graduates throughout the state to both further develop and disseminate the seeds, and he organized the boys and girls of Richland County in 1904 in a corn-project activity.

==== Boys' and Girls' Clubs ====
The corn project activities the young folks participated in were exhibited at the county fair and ten samples were chosen to be sent to the National Corn Show in Chicago. All of these ten samples went to the National Corn Show, and drew prizes, some as high as $50 and $60. The corn club work was started in six other Wisconsin counties during the following year and in the third year, enough seed was harvested to invite all counties in the state to partake in club work, using the newly developed pedigree seed corn. It was by this method that Moore was able to get to the farmers of Wisconsin, better seed corn. In the early 1930s, the Golden Glow variety constituted about half of the one hundred million bushels of corn raised in the state of Wisconsin annually, and using the same techniques, the Oderbrucker barley was developed and grown throughout the state, increasing yields by ten or more bushels per acre.

==== Wisconsin Experiment Association ====
The object of the Wisconsin Experiment Association, later known as the Wisconsin Crop Improvement Association, when it was developed in 1901, was to grow and disseminate the improved pedigree seed grain. There were 187 charter members, but that number increased rapidly, and the early 1930s there were over four thousand members. By the 1930s, the association sold over $3,000,000 worth of pedigree grain to all parts of the world, annually. Japan has adopted our Golden Glow corn as their national variety and these are only some of the results of Moore's great work in grain improvement. As a result, Moore has not only been titled the "Father of Wisconsin 4-H", he has also been called, "The father of Agronomy." The creation of the Wisconsin Experiment Association in 1901, helped initiate the development of the Agronomy Department at the University of Wisconsin-Madison College of Agriculture, and evolved into the Wisconsin Crop Improvement Association, and led to the development of the County Order in 1908, the Hemp Order in 1917, the Sorghum Order in 1920, the Alfalfa Order in 1911 (and other Orders), and also gave birth to the International Crop Improvement Association in 1919–1920, which Moore was named president and was later called the Association of Official Seed Certification Agencies, AOSCA.

== Death ==
Moore, after years of poor health, died on February 26, 1941, in Madison, Wisconsin, at age 79. That June 22, at the 4-H knoll overlooking Lake Mendota, 4-H club members dedicated a young maple tree to the University of Wisconsin teacher. On November 13, 1944, the World War II Liberty Ship SS Ransom A. Moore was named in his honor and launched at Panama City, Florida. The ship was out of commission by March 22, 1945, after it was damaged from shelling by Allied ships in the Philippines.

== Publications ==
- "Oat Smut in Wisconsin"

Ransom Asa Moore - 1902

- "On the Prevention of Oat Smut and Potato Scab"

Ransom Asa Moore - 1903

- "Alfalfa in Wisconsin"

Ransom Asa Moore - 1904

- "Oat smut and its Prevention" Volumes 108-121

Ransom Asa Moore - 1904

- "Alfalfa, or Lucern"

Ransom Asa Moore, George Alfred Olson, Alden Lescombe Stone - 1905

- "The Seeding, Growing, and Curing of Alfalfa"

R. A. Moore - 1907

- "The Seeding, Growing, and Curing of Alfalfa"

Ransom Asa Moore, University of Wisconsin. Agricultural Experiment Station - 1908

- "Grains and Forage Crops for Northern Wisconsin"

Ransom Asa Moore, Edmond Joseph Delwiche - Vol. 161. University of Wisconsin, Agricultural Experiment Station, 1908.

- "The Field Pea in Wisconsin"

Ransom Asa Moore, Edmond Joseph Delwiche University of Wisconsin, Agricultural Experiment Station, 1909.

- "The Eradication of Farm Weeds with Iron Sulphate"

Ransom Asa Moore, Alden Lescombe Stone University of Wisconsin, Agricultural Experiment Station, 1909.

- "Growing Clover for Seed and Forage in Northern Wisconsin"

Ransom Asa Moore, Edmond Joseph Delwiche Vol. 183. The University of Wisconsin, Agricultural Experiment Station, 1909.

- "Corn Judging"

Moore, Ransom Asa, and G. B. Mortimer University of Wisconsin, Agricultural Experiment Station of the College of Agriculture, 1909

- "The Curing and Testing of Seed Corn"

Ransom Asa Moore - 1910

- "Barley Culture in Wisconsin"

University of Wisconsin-Madison. Agricultural Experiment Station, A.L. Stone, R.A. Moore - 1911

- "Importance of Alfalfa as a Wisconsin Forage Plant"

Ransom Asa Moore University of Wisconsin, Agricultural Experiment Station, 1912.

- "Wisconsin Bankers' Agricultural Contests"

Ransom Asa Moore, Kirk Lester Hatch - 1912

- "Soybeans: An Important Wisconsin Crop"

Ransom Asa Moore, Edmond Joseph Delwiche - 1914

- "Alfalfa Growing in Wisconsin"

Ransom Asa Moore, Laurence Frederick Graber - 1915

- "Grow Beans"

Ransom Asa Moore - 1917

- "Why Not Buckwheat?"

Ransom Asa Moore - University of Wisconsin, Agricultural Extension Service, May, 1917 "Help Fill the Nation's Flour Barrel" Ransom Asa Moore, Edmond Joseph Delwiche - 1917

- "Soybeans: A Crop Worth Growing"

Ransom Asa Moore, Edmond Joseph Delwiche - 1918 - Read - More editions

- "Plant Production: Part I. Agronomy. Part II. Horticuluture"

Ransom Asa Moore, Charles Parker Halligan - 1919

- "Alfalfa in Wisconsin"

Ransom Asa Moore, Laurence Frederick Graber - 1919 "Wisconsin Rye" Ransom Asa Moore, B. D. Leith Agricultural Experiment Station, University of Wisconsin, 1921.

- "Make Alfalfa A Sure Crop"

Ransom Asa Moore, Laurence Frederick Graber - 1922

- "Soybeans: A Good Legume Crop Borrowed from the Orient"

Ransom Asa Moore, George McSpadden Briggs, Edmond Joseph Delwiche - 1925

- "Wisconsin's Opportunity With Alfalfa"

Ransom Asa Moore, University of Wisconsin—Madison. Agricultural Experiment Station, Laurence Frederick Graber - 1925

- "A Quarter of a Century of Progress in Crop Improvement" A Report of the Secretary, February 1927

Author Ransom Asa Moore Publisher Wisconsin Experiment Association, 1927
