= Arthur Griffin (photographer) =

American photographer

- Born: 12 September 1903; Lawrence, Massachusetts
- Died: 2001 (aged 97-98)
- Occupation: Photographer

Arthur Griffin (September 12, 1903 – 2001) was an American photographer.

== Biography ==
In the 1920s, he trained as an illustrator. In 1929, he became interested in photography, from the mid-1930s he became a staff photographer for The Boston Globe newspaper, then for Life and Time magazines. He became one of the first photographers in New England to take color photographs. In the 1930s, a color landscape photograph by Griffin was the first to be published in a separate tab for The Saturday Evening Post. At the same time, the first color photo portrait of the popular baseball player Ted Williams of the Boston Red Sox club appeared in Life.

In 1962, Griffin's first color photo album of New England landscapes was released.

In 1994, one of Griffin's biographers wrote: It's a rare house not to find Griffin's photograph in a telephone directory, calendar, annual report, magazine, or book.

In 1992, Griffin opened the Griffin Museum of Photography in Boston, to whose collection he donated his 75,000 photographs After his death in 2001, the Griffin Foundation was established which provides grants and scholarships for photographers.

== Literature ==
- The Great Life Photographers. London: Thames / Hudson. 2011. p. 608. ISBN 978-0-500-28836-8.
