= John Harding (photographer) =

American photographer

John Forrest Harding (born 1940) is a San Francisco–based photographer best known for the color street photography that he has pursued for four decades. Harding is the author of several photography books, and has taught courses on photography at City College of San Francisco and College of Marin.

== Life and career ==
John Harding (Note: Full name: John Forrest Harding. "John Harding", Smithsonian American Art Museum. Retrieved February 8, 2019.) was born on August 6, 1940 in Washington, D.C. and grew up in Granite City, Illinois. He worked at Granite City Steel, studied at Southern Illinois University, took up photography after seeing the film Blow-up, and studied at the San Francisco Art Institute under Jack Fulton (Note: Fulton's website is here.) and Henry Wessel, obtaining an MFA in 1976.

Harding has worked on commercial and editorial assignments (for Fortune and elsewhere), and has taught in the College of Marin and the Photography Department of the City College of San Francisco.

Separately from the work he was assigned to do, Harding long photographed for his own interest. From 1975 to 1976, he made black and white portraits of adult brothers and sisters in the US. Thanks in part to an NEA grant, the series was published in 1982 in the photobooks Geschwister and Siblings; in 2016, he published a supplement, also titled Siblings.

Harding started to work in color in 1977. Writing in 2011, Stacen Berg described him as having photographed on the street "[n]early every day for over 30 years" (and still using color 35 mm film in a Leica camera).

In 1989, Susan Kismaric could write that street photography, "so prominent in the history of [photography], is practically nonexistent in California": as its exponents there, she could only name Harding, Wessel and Bill Dane in San Francisco, and Anthony Hernandez on Rodeo Drive.

Harding's street photography of the 1980s was sampled in the 1987 book American Independents. Its editor, Sally Eauclaire, wrote that Harding's photographs had the objective of "[deriving] poetic fancy from prosaic fact", that "Their kaleidoscopically shifting shapes and colors reveal much about the jostle of humanity as well as trends in fashion and social and sexual mores." Eauclaire praised Harding's achievement of "[pushing] realism into the realm of surrealism", attained via devices of isolation within crowds, of reflections, "helterskelter highlighting, and hedonistic jostlings of color". Yet Harding managed to declare "solidity, permanence, and the possibility of definition".

A larger collection did not appear in print until the 2011 publication (in Japan) of Harding's photobook Analog Days, which had photographs taken from 1979 to 2009, and about which Stan Banos writes:

One sees much street photography that relies on a single formula, Harding's work mixes it up, with content, composition and yes, color, all vying and battling it out for domination, or the creation of some tenuous, dynamic coexistence. It draws you in, excites you and keeps you interested.

In a foreword to Analog Days, Sandra S. Phillips writes that its photographs "are so direct, and so marvelously natural, that for a moment we forget that they were framed and 'taken' by someone." She concludes that "Street photography has the potential to reveal our social selves to us, and as Harding's viewfinder shows, it can also provide a particular gracefulness and wonder."

Harding's next full-scale book was Streets of Discontent, published in a small edition in 2018. Again collecting color views of the streets of San Francisco, but this time consisting of very recent work, its subtlety is praised by Corey Keller, who also points out that:

[This work] coincides with a moment in which [San Francisco] seems to teeter on the brink as the gap between the haves and the have-nots widens daily into a chasm. The splendor of the city's soaring new buildings is matched only by the wretchedness of those who live on its streets. Harding's pictures neither elevate nor condemn. They just ask us to notice.

== Awards ==
- National Endowment for the Arts individual photographer's fellowship, 1977.
- John Simon Guggenheim Memorial Foundation photographer's fellowship, 1983.

== Exhibitions ==
=== Solo and two-person exhibitions ===
- The Siblings. (With Laura Gilpin.) Focus Gallery, San Francisco, 1976.
- Fifty-two Sittings. Canessa Gallery, San Francisco, 1977.
- Greece/Photographs. IVC Gallery, Novato, California, 1982.
- Pictures Seen/Fortunes Found: Color Photographs from San Francisco's Chinatown. Canessa Gallery, San Francisco, 1977.
- Two Views of Mallorca. (With Elena Sheehan.) Focus Gallery, San Francisco, 1985.

=== Group exhibitions ===
- Color in the Street. California Museum of Photography (UCR), March–April 1983. With Mark Cohen, Helen Levitt, Joel Meyerowitz, Leo Rubinfien, Stephen Scheer, Joel Sternfeld, Charles Traub, Robert Walker, Alex Webb.
- Exposed and Developed. National Museum of American Art, Smithsonian Institution (traveling exhibition), 1984.
- Color Photographs: Recent Acquisitions. Museum of Modern Art, August–October 1984.
- Cross Currents/Cross Country. Photographic Resource Center, Boston University, August–October 1988.
- Real Fictions: Recent Color Photographs by Bill Dane, John Harding and Larry Sultan. San Francisco Museum of Modern Art, 1989. With Bill Dane and Larry Sultan, curated by Sandra S. Phillips.
- 10 x 10 x 10: An Invitational Exhibition. San Francisco City Hall, July–September 2009. Ten photographers – Harding, and Chris McCaw, Jesse Schlesinger, Daniel Grant, Alexander Martinez, Mark McKnight, Ken Botto, Mary Parisi, Lucy Goodhart, Eric Percher – each exhibited ten works. "Stacen Berg chose John Harding for his careful compositions of people who are 'entirely distanced from their public environment'."
- The Anniversary Show. San Francisco Museum of Modern Art, 2009–2011.
- Hamburger Eyes presents: Casual Abyss. Mission Cultural Center for Latino Arts, San Francisco, May–July 2010.
- San Francisco Days: Documentary Photographs Spanning 30 Years. Rayko Photo Center, January–February 2013. With Janet Delaney, Lou Dematteis, Gabriela Hasbun, André Hermann, Michael Jang, Mimi Plumb, and Andrei Riskin.
- 3@6×6 face/people/action. Photo, Oakland, CA, March 2015. With Michael Jang and Hiroyo Kaneko.

== Publications ==
=== Books and booklets by Harding ===
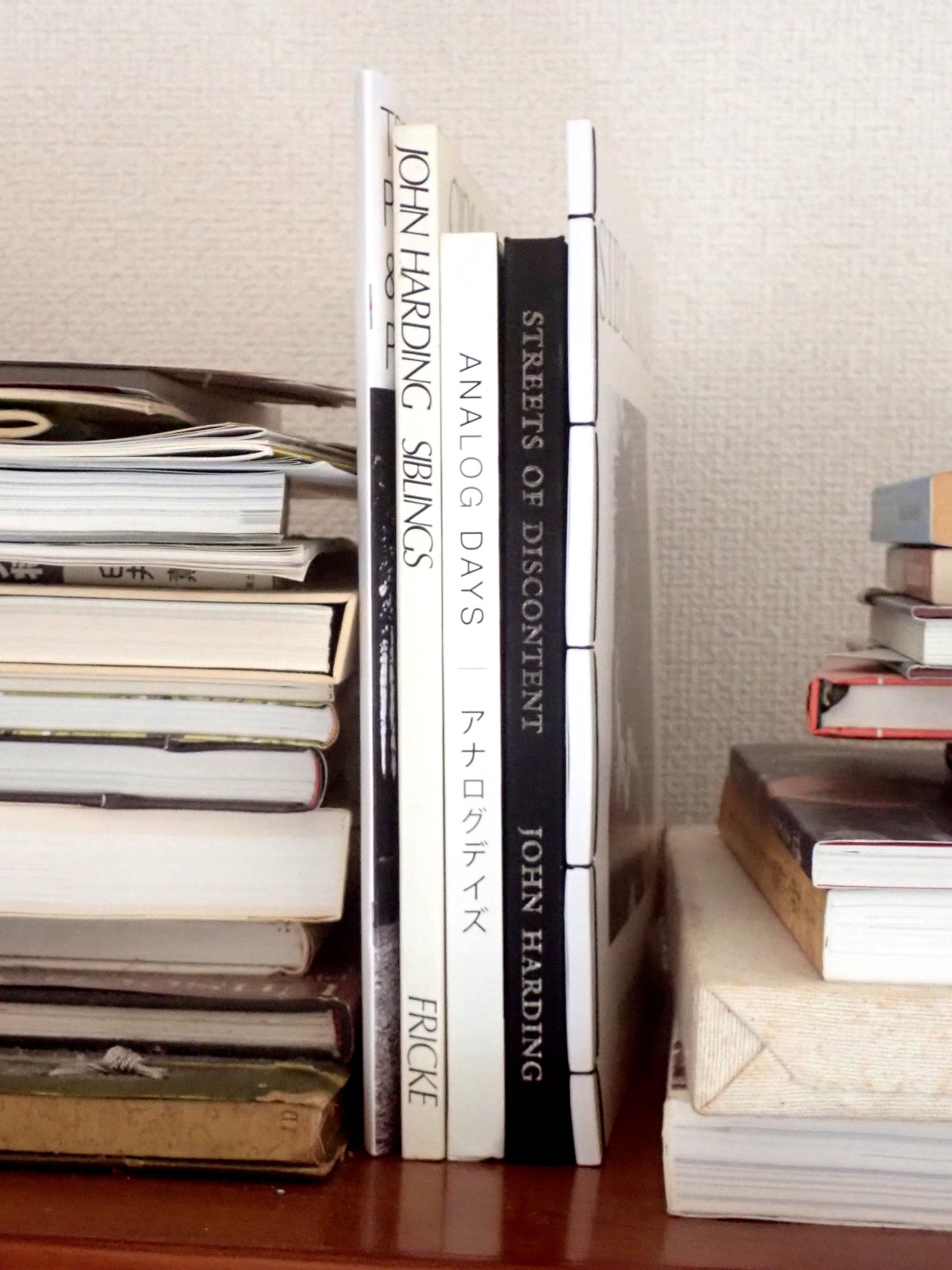
From left to right: Trees Places and People, Siblings (1982), Analog Days, Streets of Discontent, Siblings (2016)

- Geschwister. Frankfurt am Main: Dieter Fricke, 1982. ISBN 3-88184-018-4. With text by Gabriele Wohmann.
- Siblings. Frankfurt am Main: Dieter Fricke, 1982. ISBN 3-88184-052-4. Captions (one sentence or a little more per photograph, uttered by a sibling at the time) in both German and English; other text in English only.
- Analog Days = アナログデイズ. Tokyo: Sokyu-sha, 2011. ISBN 978-0-615-46498-5. Edited by Henry Wessel; foreword by Sandra S. Phillips; introduction by Stacen Berg. In both English and Japanese. Edition of 500. (Note: Description of Analog Days, Harding's previous website.) (Note: Description of Analog Days, with sample page spreads, from the publisher's bookstore.)
- Trees Places and People. [San Francisco]: [John Harding], 2015. Photographs taken in San Francisco, 2013–2015. Edition of 50. (Note: Description of Trees Places and People from the Sokyu-sha bookstore. (Although this says that the edition is of 30, copies have numbers out of 50 handwritten on the back.))
- The Attraction of Strangers. [San Francisco]: [John Harding], Hannah Louise Schuster, Mūnbeibī Design Studio [2016]. OCLC 957364259. With text by Katya Kallsen. Edition of 10. On the first page: "On New Year's Day 1992, I divided a map of San Francisco into thirty three squares and put the pieces into a small green bag. I resolved once a week to draw a square from the bag and drive to that part of the city to look for a stranger who I might want to photograph. I asked Katya to join me to write about these encounters. These words and photographs tell and show where we went and who we found"
- San Francisco Four × Five. [San Francisco]: [John Harding], Hannah Louise Schuster, Mūnbeibī Design Studio [2016]. OCLC 957361870. Edition of 10. On the first page: "The 4x5 photographs of San Francisco in this book were taken between 2002 and 2004."
- Siblings. [San Francisco]: [John Harding], 2016. OCLC 957298471. (Note: Description of Siblings, with sample page spreads, from the Sokyu-sha bookstore.) On the very first (but unnumbered) page: "These thirty-three photographs were taken in the late 1970s on an NEA Grant for a Siblings project, which resulted in a book published in Germany in 1982. In retrospect these photographs seem just as interesting as those in the first book, and this was done to catalogue the remainder of the work."
- Seeing Things. [San Francisco]: [John Harding], 2016. OCLC 1002262328. On the first page: "The photographs in this book were made between 1977 and 1982. Most of them were taken in 1981 along the coast of California."
- Streets of Discontent. [San Francisco]: [John Harding], 2018. ISBN 978-0-692-09513-3. Edited by Henry Wessel; introduction by Corey Keller; afterword by Jack von Euw. Edition of 50. On the title page: "The photographs in this book were made primarily in San Francisco and some in Los Angeles in 2017 and 2018." (Note: Description of Streets of Discontent, with sample page spreads, from the Sokyu-sha bookstore.) (Note: Description of Streets of Discontent, Harding's previous website.)

=== Books with contributions by Harding ===
- Sally Eauclaire, ed. American Independents: Eighteen Color Photographers. New York: Abbeville, 1987. ISBN 0-89659-666-4. Includes "Perfect Strangers" by Harding (eight plates, each "Untitled 1983–84"); and also work by Larry Babis, Jim Dow, William Eggleston, Mitch Epstein, David T. Hanson, Len Jenshel, Nancy Lloyd, Kenneth McGowan, Roger Mertin, Joel Meyerowitz, Richard Misrach, Joanne Mulberg, Stephen Scheer, Stephen Shore, Joel Sternfeld, Jack D. Teemer, Jr., and Daniel S. Williams.
- Chuck Mobley, ed. An Autobiography of the San Francisco Bay Area, Part 1: San Francisco Plays Itself. San Francisco: SF Camerawork, 2010. ISBN 9780984303809. (Note: For a description of this book, see the SF Camerawork store.)

== Permanent collections ==
- California Museum of Photography, University of California, Riverside.
- San Francisco Museum of Modern Art. Eighty inkjet prints from Analog Days; prints from the series Siblings and Aspects of an Aviary, and others.
- Arizona State University Art Museum, Tempe.
- New Orleans Museum of Art.
- Princeton University Art Museum, Princeton, New Jersey. Four untitled color prints, 1980–1983.
- International Center of Photography, New York.
- Museum of Fine Arts, Houston. Six chromogenic prints.
- Museum of Modern Art, New York. Six photographs.
- Metropolitan Museum of Art, New York. Nine photographs.
- First National Bank of Chicago Photography Collection.
- Smithsonian American Art Museum. Prints from the series Siblings. (The Smithsonian holds the records of the Focus Gallery.)
- Bibliothèque nationale de France, Paris.

=== Archive ===
The Bancroft Library (University of California, Berkeley) acquired a large photographic archive (OCLC 521092126) from Harding in 2010; it has been supplemented several times since then.
