= Charles H. Traub =

American photographer and educator (born 1945)

- Born: April 6, 1945 (age 81); Louisville, Kentucky, United States
- Education: Chicago Institute of Design; University of Illinois, Urbana-Champaign
- Occupations: Photographer, educator, author
- Known for: Dolce Via; In The Still Life; Beach
- Awards: Brendan Gill Award; ICP Infinity Award
- Website: www.charlestraub.com

Charles H. Traub (born April 6, 1945) is an American photographer and educator, known for his ironic real world witness color photography. He was chair of the photography department at Columbia College Chicago, where he helped establish its Museum of Contemporary Photography (MOCP) in 1976, and became a director of New York's Light Gallery in 1977. Traub founded the MFA program in Photography, Video, and Related Media at the School of Visual Arts in New York City in 1987, which was the first program of its kind to fully embrace digital photographic practice. He has been Chairperson of the program since. Traub has published many books of his photographs and writings on photography and media.

== Early life and education ==
Born and raised in Louisville, Kentucky, Traub earned his BA in English literature at the University of Illinois, where both his mother and father had also attended. In 1967, during his last semester of his senior year in college, he took his first photography class with the landscape photographer Art Sinsabaugh using the camera left to him by his recently deceased father. His family roots in both central Illinois and Kentucky gave inspiration for his early photographic work.

After college, Traub joined the Peace Corps in Ethiopia. He married a fellow Peace Corps member, who died shortly after arriving in Ethiopia. Traub himself was injured and returned home where he met fellow Kentuckian, Ralph Eugene Meatyard, who became an important inspiration and friend. Although he enrolled in a graduate program in humanities at the University of Louisville, he was drafted into the United States Army as an infantryman but was subsequently discharged for medical reasons incurred during his time with the Peace Corps.

After service in the United States Army in 1969, Traub decided to pursue photography at the Chicago Institute of Design. There he earned his Master of Science studying under Aaron Siskind, Arthur Siegel and Garry Winogrand. During this time, he began to experiment with different formats and processes in his landscape photographs of Kentucky, Indiana, and Illinois. He has said "You probably recognize the similar sentiment that exists in all of those earlier pictures; they all share a certain kind of Southern Gothic, dark, and maudlin sensibility." His thesis of haunting, abstracted black-and-white positive and negative landscapes, "Edge to Edge", was widely exhibited, and featured in a solo show at the Art Institute of Chicago (1975).

== Career ==
Following his landscape work Charles Traub made three well-known series of black-and-white photographs: Street, Parties, and his first monograph, Beach, all used an innovative vignette on a Rolleiflex SL66.

In 1971 Traub began teaching full-time at Columbia College Chicago, and was responsible of developing new curriculum for the growing public interest in the medium. He was instrumental in developing the school's Contemporary Trends Lecture Series that celebrated renowned international photographers and image-makers. Subsequently, he became chairperson of the department and founded the Chicago Center for Contemporary Photography, which became the Museum of Contemporary Photography (MOCP). In 1973, along with his colleague Douglas Baz, Traub went on a sabbatical to make the Cajun Document, extensive look at the culture of the Louisiana bayous. Traub's first major body of work in color, Street Portraits, began in 1976, continued after his move to New York City shortly thereafter, and culminated in his monograph Lunchtime.

His move to New York was followed by his first solo exhibition of photographs at the Light Gallery. Its owner, Tennyson Schad, then hired Traub to become director of this prestigious gallery. Traub curated numerous exhibitions there, including The New Vision: Forty Years of Photography at the Institute of Design; Aaron Siskind's Harlem Document; Designed for Photography; and The Color Work of the FSA. Traub also showcased major photographers new to the gallery: William Klein, Luigi Ghirri, Ray Metzker, Mario Giacomelli and Louis Faurer among others. During this time, he attempted to connect the communities of photographers and artists working in other media.

After leaving the gallery in 1980 he continued his personal work and formed the Wayfarer partnership with Jerry Gordon—a specialized editorial and corporate photography agency. Their work was featured in many magazines, including Life, Time, Forbes, Fortune, Business Week, New York and Avenue as well as annual reports for Fortune 500 companies. Throughout the 1980s Traub traveled to Italy, Brazil, Haiti, Morocco and the Far East for his personal work. Dolce Via and In the Still Life are compendiums of photographs from that period.

In 1987 Traub was asked to design a graduate studies program for the School of Visual Arts, which became the MFA Photography, Video and Related Media Department. Since its inception, the program has been distinguished for its innovative use of digital technology, the inclusion of all aspects of the lens and screen arts and its internationally celebrated faculty. As an early advocate of the power of digital photography, Traub adapted it to his own practice. His philosophy about the importance of digital thinking is reflected in the manifesto Creative Interlocutor and the textbook In the Realm of the Circuit. Creative projects that highlight Traub's integration of new technologies include the interactive website Still Life in America and the iBook No Perfect Heroes: Photographing Grant.

Here is New York: a democracy of photographs was co-founded by Traub and three others. This living memorial to the tragedy of 9/11 received the Brendan Gill Award as well as the ICP Cornell Capa Infinity Award. It is considered one of the seminal examples of crowdsourcing, digital production and online distribution of universally produced imagery. The exhibition traveled to 42 venues worldwide, and with its Web presence is considered to be one of the most widely viewed exhibitions of all time.

Traub has dedicated himself to photographic education, and has been a chairperson at the School of Visual Arts for 30 years. He has served on a number of non-profit educational boards, and is the president of the Aaron Siskind Foundation. He has had more than 60 major exhibitions in galleries and museums throughout the world, including one-person shows at the Art Institute of Chicago, The Speed Museum, Hudson River Museum and Historic New Orleans Collection. Traub's work is in the permanent collections of more than two dozen major museums worldwide.

== Publications ==
- Taken By Design: Photographs From the Institute of Design, 1937–1971, edited by Charles H. Traub, Art Institute of Chicago, 1971
- Chicago: The City and its Artists 1945–1978, University of Michigan Museum of Art, 1987
- Charles Traub: Beach, Horizon Press, 1978 (monograph)
- The New Vision: Forty Years of Photography at the Institute of Design, Introduction by John Grimes, Aperture, 1982
- New York City Youth: An Intimate Portrait, Summer Jobs, (with Jerry Gordon), 1987
- Italy Observed In Photography and Literature, co-edited by Charles H. Traub, Preface by Umberto Eco, Rizzoli, 1988
- Aaron Siskind: Roadtrip Photographs 1980–1988, 1989
- Three Decades of Midwestern Photography: 1960–1990, Davenport Museum of Art, 1990
- An Angler's Album: Fishing in Photography and Literature, edited by Charles H. Traub, Rizzoli, 1990
- Creative Interlocutor, written by Charles H. Traub, 2000
- Here is New York: A Democracy of Photographs, co-edited by Charles H. Traub, Scalo, 2002
- In the Realm of Circuit: Computers, Art, and Culture, Textbook co-authored with Jonathan Lipkin, Pearson Prentice Hall, 2003
- In the Still Life, Introduction by Luigi Ballerini, The Quantuck Lane Press, 2004 (monograph)
- The Education of a Photographer, co-edited with Steven Heller and Adam B. Bell, Allworth Press, 2006
- Charles H. Traub, Introduction by Marvin Heiferman, Gitterman Gallery, 2006 (monograph)
- Object of My Creation: Photographs 1967–1970, photographs and text by Charles H. Traub, Gitterman Gallery, 2011 (monograph)
- Dolce Via: Italy in the 1980s, Introduction by Max Kozloff, Dialogue by Luigi Ballerini, Damiani, 2014 (monograph)
- Vision Anew. Co-edited by Adam Bell, University of California Press, 2015
- Lunchtime, photographs and text by Charles H. Traub, Damiani, 2015 (monograph)
- No Perfect Heroes: Photographing Grant, interactive iBook, Interlocutor Press, 2016

== Exhibitions ==
=== Solo ===
- 1975 Museum of the Art Institute of Chicago, Chicago, Illinois
- 1975 Art Institute of Chicago, Illinois
- 1978 Camerawork, San Francisco, California
- 1979 Museum of Contemporary Photography, Chicago, Illinois
- 1980 Padiglione d'Arte Contemporanea, Milan, Italy
- 1980 Photographer's Place, London, England
- 1982 Hudson River Museum, New York
- 1983 Art gallery, Tokyo University, Japan
- 1983 Art Directors Guild of New York, NY
- 1988 Municipal Art Society, New York, NY
- 1989 The Arsenal, Central Park, New York, NY
- 1989 The Urban Center, New York, NY
- 2005 Gitterman Gallery, New York, NY
- 2005 Blue Sky Gallery, Portland, Oregon
- 2006 Gitterman Gallery, New York, NY
- 2011 Gitterman Gallery, New York, NY

=== Group ===
- 1977 The Photographer and the City, Museum of Contemporary Art, Chicago, Illinois
- 1980 Creative Photography Lab, MIT, Boston, Massachusetts
- 1982 International Center for Photography, Traveling Exhibit for the U.S. and South America
- 1983 Bauhaus-Chicago, Musée Réattu, Arles, France
- 1983 Museo Nationale, Naples and Palazzo Fortuny, Venice, Italy
- 1983 Color in the Street. California Museum of Photography (UCR), March–April. With Mark Cohen, John Harding, Helen Levitt, Joel Meyerowitz, Leo Rubinfien, Stephen Scheer, Joel Sternfeld, Robert Walker, and Alex Webb.
- 1983 California Museum of Photography, University of California, Riverside, California
- 1983–1987 Summer Visiting Artist Exhibitions, Catskill Center for Photography, Woodstock, New York
- 1984 Musee d'Art Moderne, Paris
- 1985 L.A.O.O.C. Museum of Contemporary Art, L.A.
- 1987 University Art Gallery, Wright State University, Dayton, Ohio
- 1993 Biennial Festival of Italian Photography, New York, NY
- 2002 The Photographers' Gallery, London
- 2002 Taken by Design, Art Institute of Chicago; San Francisco Museum of Modern Art, The Philadelphia Museum of Art
- 2008–2009 Cajun Document: Charles Traub and Douglas Baz, The Historic New Orleans Collection, New Orleans, Louisiana
- 2009 This is not a Fashion Photograph: Selections from the ICP Collection, International Center of Photography, New York City
- 2009 Big City, Wien Museum, Vienna, Austria
- 2010 Street Photography: Selected Works from Six Decades, Jorg Maas, Berlin, Germany

== Collections ==
- Art Institute of Chicago, Chicago, Illinois
- George Eastman House, Rochester, New York
- Museum of Modern Art, New York City
- Museum of Fine Arts, Houston, Texas
- Bibliothèque Nationale, Paris, France
- Fogg Museum, Harvard Art Museums, Boston, Massachusetts
- Philadelphia Museum of Art, Philadelphia, Pennsylvania
- Museum of Contemporary Photography, Chicago, Illinois
- Amon Carter Museum, Fort Worth, Texas
- The Henry Buhl Collection
- Cincinnati Art Museum, Ohio
- Princeton University, New Jersey
- Yale University, Connecticut
- International Center of Photography ICP, New York
- The Nelson Atkins Museum of Art, Missouri

== Grants and awards ==
- The Mary McDowell Center for Learning
- Illinois Art Council (1976)
- Olympics Arts Organization Committee (1984)
- New York State Council on the Arts (1987)
- Brendan Gill Award (here is new york, 2002)
- ICP Cornell Capa Infinity Award (here is new york, 2002)
