= Larry Sultan =

American photographer (1946–2009)

- Born: July 13, 1946; Brooklyn, New York, US
- Died: December 13, 2009 (aged 63); Greenbrae, California, US
- Education: University of California, Santa Barbara; San Francisco Art Institute
- Occupations: Photographer, professor
- Spouse: Katherine Sultan
- Website: larrysultan.com

Larry Sultan (July 13, 1946 – December 13, 2009) was an American photographer from the San Fernando Valley in California. He taught at the San Francisco Art Institute from 1978 to 1988 and at the California College of the Arts in San Francisco 1989 to 2009.

Sultan's books include Evidence (1977) with Mike Mandel, Pictures From Home (1992) and The Valley (2004). A recipient of a Guggenheim Fellowship, his work is exhibited in museums in the United States.

== Early life and education ==
Sultan was born on July 13, 1946, in Brooklyn, New York to a Jewish family. He grew up in the San Fernando Valley, part of Los Angeles, California, where his parents moved when he was an infant. He graduated from the University of California, Santa Barbara with a bachelor's degree in political science, and received a master's degree in fine arts from the San Francisco Art Institute in San Francisco.

== Life and work ==
He started his career in the 1970s as a conceptual photographer. In 1977, he published a collection of photographs he found in corporate and government archives called Evidence with fellow photographer Mike Mandel. The New York Times characterized Evidence as "a watershed in the history of art photography." The two men also created billboards aimed at slowing down road traffic. He then published Pictures From Home, a collection of photographs taken of his parents in the San Fernando Valley from 1982 to 1992, whose role was to question societal expectations of gender and aging. His 2004 assignment for Maxim, which consisted of photographs of middle-class residences rented by the porn industry in the San Fernando Valley, led to another photographic series called The Valley. He photographed Paris Hilton for Interview in his parents' bedroom in his childhood home.

Sultan was an instructor of photography at his alma mater, the San Francisco Art Institute, from 1978 to 1988. He then taught at the California College of the Arts in San Francisco as Chair of the Photography Department from 1993 to 1999, and as distinguished professor of art from 1989 to 2009.

He served on the board of trustees of the Headlands Center for the Arts from 1992 to 1998. At the time of his death he was the artist trustee at San Francisco Museum of Modern Art, a position he had taken up in the same year.

He was married to Katherine Sultan, also known as Kelly Sultan. He died of cancer on December 13, 2009, at his home in Greenbrae, California.

== Publications ==
- Sultan, Larry; Mandel, Mike (1974). How to Read Music in One Evening. Clatworthy Colorvues.
- DeCoster, Miles; Metcalf, Paul; Klett, Mark; Sultan, Larry; Mandel, Mike (1989). Headlands: The Marin Coast at the Golden Gate. Albuquerque, New Mexico: University of New Mexico Press. ISBN 9780826311511.
- Sultan, Larry (1992). Pictures From Home. New York City, New York: Harry N. Abrams Inc. ISBN 978-0810937215.
- Sultan, Larry (2004). The Valley. Zurich: Scalo. ISBN 9783908247791.
- Sultan, Larry (2010). Katherine Avenue. Göttingen, Germany: Steidl. ISBN 978-3869301358.
- Sultan, Larry (2012). Zander, Thomas (ed.). Larry Sultan and Mike Mandel. New York City, New York: Distributed Art Publishers, Incorporated (D.A.P. Inc.). ISBN 9781935202820.
- Morse, Rebecca (2014). Larry Sultan: Here and Home. Sandra Phillips (contributor), Philip Gefter (contributor). New York City, New York: Prestel USA. ISBN 978-3791353883.
- Sultan, Larry; Mandel, Mike (2017). Evidence. New York City, New York: Distributed Art Publishers, Incorporated (D.A.P. Inc.). ISBN 9781942884149.

== Awards ==
- 1976: Art in Public Places grant, National Endowment for the Arts. With Mike Mandel
- 1977: Photographer’s Fellowship, National Endowment for the Arts. With Mike Mandel
- 1980: Photographer’s Fellowship, National Endowment for the Arts
- 1983: Guggenheim Fellowship from the John Simon Guggenheim Memorial Foundation
- 1986: Photographer’s Fellowship, National Endowment for the Arts
- 1990: Fleishhacker Foundation Eureka Fellowship
- 1991: Biennial Award, The Louis Comfort Tiffany Foundation
- 1992: Photographer’s Fellowship, National Endowment for the Arts

== Exhibitions ==
=== Solo exhibitions ===
- 2012–2013: Larry Sultan's Homeland: American Story, Amon Carter Museum of American Art, Fort Worth, TX, October 2012 – January 2013.
- 2014–2015: Larry Sultan: Here and Home, Los Angeles County Museum of Art (LACMA), Los Angeles, CA, November 2014 – May 2015; Milwaukee Art Museum, Milwaukee, WI, October 2015 - January 2016.
- 2014–2015: Larry Sultan, Stedelijk Museum voor Actuele Kunst, Ghent, Belgium, March-May 2015.

=== Group exhibitions ===
- 1989: Real Fictions: Recent Color Photographs by Bill Dane, John Harding and Larry Sultan, San Francisco Museum of Modern Art. With Bill Dane and John Harding, curated by Sandra S. Phillips.
- 2011–2012: Here, Pier 24 Photography, San Francisco, CA, May 2011 – January 2012.
- 2012–2013: About Face, Pier 24 Photography, San Francisco, CA, May 2012 – April 2013.
- 2014–2015 Secondhand, Pier 24 Photography, San Francisco, CA, August 2014 – May 2015.

== Collections ==
Sultan's work is held in the following permanent collections:

- Art Institute of Chicago, Chicago, IL: 33 prints (as of January 2021)
- Pier 24 Photography, San Francisco, CA
- San Francisco Museum of Modern Art, San Francisco, CA
- Solomon R. Guggenheim Museum, New York City
- Tate Modern, London
- Whitney Museum of American Art, New York City

== See also ==
- Pictures From Home, a play written by Sharr White based on the book
