= Mike Mandel =

American artist and photographer

Mike Mandel (born 1950) is an American conceptual artist and photographer. According to his artist profile, his work "questions the meaning of photographic imagery within popular culture and draws from snapshots, advertising, news photographs, and public and corporate archives."

Most of the publications Mandel has been involved with have been self-published: his own, his early conceptual collaborations with Larry Sultan, and his later collaborations with Chantal Zakari. He is best known for Evidence (1977), a book of found photographs he and Sultan assembled, regarded as "one of the most influential photography titles of the past 50 years"; and for his Baseball Photographer Trading Cards (1975), a set of baseball cards with 134 different photographers and curators posing as ball players.

Mandel has had a solo exhibition at San Francisco Museum of Modern Art and his work is in the permanent collections of major institutions.

== Life and work ==
Mandel was born in 1950 in Los Angeles (LA), and grew up in the San Fernando Valley. He was a student at San Fernando Valley State College, northwest of LA, then moved up the coast to San Francisco in 1973 for graduate studies at San Francisco Art Institute.

=== Photographic work ===
The 1970s was an incredibly productive decade for Mandel. Before he turned 21 Mandel completed People in Cars and Myself: Timed Exposures among a number of conceptual photography projects, many of them self-published in book form that were later (2015) collected and re-published as a boxed edition of facsimile books and objects entitled Good 70s, edited by Mandel, Jason Fulford and Sharon Helgason Gallagher The publication led to a recognition of his 1970s projects in two concurrent solo exhibitions, one at the San Francisco Museum of Modern Art (SFMOMA) and the other at Robert Mann Gallery in New York City, both in 2017. Good 70s included People in Cars (1970), Myself: Timed Exposures (1971), Mike's Motels and Motel Postcards (1974), Mrs. Kilpatric (1974), Seven Never Before Published Portraits of Edward Weston (1974), The Baseball Photographer Trading Cards (1975), and a set of letters ostensibly written by Sandra S. Phillips, Curator Emerita at SFMOMA, to Mandel during the 1970s, Letters from Sandra. The letters are real, but the dates fictional as they were written by Phillips specifically for the 2015 publication of the box set as a tongue in cheek contextualizing device describing her feelings about Mandel's works in progress while at the same time providing a running commentary on the Watergate scandal.

For People in Cars Mandel found a street corner near his home in Van Nuys, California, and in the late afternoon light, using a wide-angle lens, he photographed people making right hand turns, often capturing the images of drivers and passengers in the front and back seats.

Good 70s included a poster of this work, but a more extensive book was published in 2017 by Stanley/Barker, UK, and Robert Mann Gallery

Mandel self-published Myself: Timed Exposures while still an undergraduate in 1971, a book of thirty-six self-portraits made alongside strangers, using the camera's self-timer. There was a measure of chance involved in making the photos as, according to Palmer, Mandel would identify a potential photographic opportunity, set up the tripod and camera and walk into the picture during the 10 second delay.

Mandel and his girlfriend at the time, Alison Woolpert, began collecting postcards from sleazy little motels, but Mandel eventually started taking pictures himself, taking the viewer on a sort of ghostly tour of long-gone 70s design and road culture." "These photos have a clear haunting and glowing, lonesome appeal you just can’t shake. You can just imagine the kids of the early 60’s escaping to these motels for vacation and kicks but now these destinations have turned into places where people go to become ghosts."

Paul Sorene on October 18, 2017, quotes Mandel in his Flashbak article, about his project where he regularly photographed a middle aged housewife who lived down the street from him in Santa Cruz, California in 1974.

Boardwalk Minus Forty is a look back at life on the beach, created during the artist's time living in Santa Cruz, California while a student at the San Francisco Art Institute. The book was published in 2017 by TBW Books as part of Series #5, one of a four book set that included books by Susan Meiselas, Bill Burke and Lee Friedlander.

In 1974 Mandel self-published his conceptual art piece, Seven Never Before Published Portraits of Edward Weston, a book of responses to questionnaires he sent to various men named Edward Weston, along with their photographs and letters.

In 1974 Mandel and Alison Woolpert, traveled across America, making portraits in the style of baseball cards of 134 photographers and curators. These included Ansel Adams, Imogen Cunningham, Harry Callahan, Minor White, Aaron Siskind, William Eggleston, Ed Ruscha, and John Szarkowski. They also collected personal statistics and comments. Mandel then created a set of baseball cards and sold them through museums and galleries, in packs of 10, at a dollar a pack.

In March, 2015, SFMOMA made a video interview of Mandel describing his 70s projects including The Baseball Photographer Trading Cards.

Marty Appel> writes in Sports Collectors Digest: SF Giants Oral History about the book Mandel self-published in 1979 about his favorite baseball team, the San Francisco Giants. Mandel is quoted: "I liked Studs Terkel’s books, and as an artist I thought that it didn’t matter what the subject matter might be, but that an artist would approach the project with a more open ended attitude. Of course, I was a Giants fan since I was eight, in 1958, so I grew up with the team in San Francisco."

==== Collaborations with Larry Sultan ====
Larry Sultan and Mandel first met as MFA students at the San Francisco Art Institute. Over the next thirty years, their artistic partnership produced an impressive body of work as well as a lifelong friendship. The two collaborated on Billboards, 15 different subvertising series displayed on billboards throughout California and elsewhere in the USA; as well as various conceptual books. Evidence (1977) is "a book of photographs sourced from scientific, industrial, police, military and other archives", over one hundred of which across the USA they visited and scoured for material. As a whole, the book suggests a mysterious atmosphere of an unexplained technologically driven, dehumanizing future. And this idea was made all the more potent because the photographs were not imagined or set up by the artists. Mandel and Sultan consider these found images as "documents" that came right from these centers of technology. Sean O'Hagan wrote in The Observer that Evidence is "now regarded as one of the most influential photography titles of the past 50 years"; Liz Jobey wrote in the Financial Times that it "is recognised as one of the signal works of contemporary photography". Randy Kennedy wrote in The New York Times that it "became a watershed in the history of art photography"; and Source in 2016 named it the second greatest photobook of all time (second only to Robert Frank's The Americans).

Between 1973 and 1989, Sultan and Mandel created fifteen unique designs for billboards installed in over ninety sites, mostly in California. They appropriated images and text from postcards, illustrated books, and magazine advertisements, replacing traditional slogans with unclear messages and nonsensical symbols. For Sultan and Mandel, the billboard evoked their media-rich hometown, Los Angeles, while offering a platform that could engage unsuspecting audiences in a typically passive and commercial context. One billboard reads "Oranges On Fire" atop an illustration of flaming citrus fruits without any rhyme or reason. Another says "Ties" above a cluster of oversized, tangled ties with no information as to where or how to purchase them. Another, reminiscent of Barbara Kruger, reads, "We Make You Us," in jarring black and red font. Working in the overlap of banal and bizarre, the artists manage to unhinge the public from their daily realities for a single moment, revealing the lurking possibility of something new.

Sultan and Mandel's early forays into the poetics of the found image and its relation to the history of the photo book began in 1974, with their small publication How to Read Music in One Evening/A Clatworthy Catalog. For this project they appropriated and re-sequenced advertising imagery found in mail-order catalogues and pulp magazines. The imagery featured photographs of nose warmers, hand-held fans and strapless bras, among other products. Despite the conventional nature of the imagery, when placed in sequence the relations and connections created between photographs evoked a strange and otherworldly mood associated with the genre and imagery of science fiction.

==== Collaborations with Chantal Zakari ====
In The Turk and the Jew, 1998, "the tumultuous relationship of a Jewish man and a Turkish woman is told in this book version of the artists' web site, in which "Boy gets girl; girl loses boy; boy and girl get on the net."

For The State of Ata (book 2010) and 7 Turkish Artists (exhibition 2011): Two visual artists—one American, the other Turkish—traveled throughout Turkey over 12 years, driven by an image they found everywhere, that of the revolutionary hero of modern Turkey, Mustafa Kemal Atatürk. The State of Ata: The Contested Imagery of Power in Turkey (18 Publications), is at once a travelogue, oral history, photo album, and meditation on Turkey's past, present, and future. Atatürk, who died in 1938, pushed Turkey to become a model Western state. The wearing of religious clothing in public was banned, women's legal rights were expanded, and the Arabic alphabet was dropped in favor of Latin characters. Yet a divide remains. In 1997 when Zakari held up a picture of Atatürk at a march of Islamists as a sign of her support for a secular society, she made front-page news all over Turkey.

Multi-National Force: Iraq in Agatha Christie's: They Came to Baghdad:

"Baghdad is the chosen location for a secret superpower meeting" in Agatha Christie's They Came to Baghdad ... In our book, They Came to Baghdad, 40 of Christie's book covers conjure an exotic site for diplomatic, and romantic intrigue. They parallel the second chapter, that includes images and news accounts of the 40 countries that have participated in the Multi-National Force deploying troops to Iraq between 2003 and 2011.

A companion artwork to Shelter in Plates, Lockdown Archive is about:

The speed with which a U.S. community could be transformed into what was essentially a police state. To recap, a few nights after the Boston marathon bombing in 2013, two men, Dzhokar and Tamerlan Tsarnaev, were implicated in the bombing ... During the ensuing night chase, Tamerlan was shot and killed by police while Dzhokar evaded arrest. Within hours, there was a citywide manhunt and Boston authorities advised citizens to shelter in place ... The city basically shut down while armed police and military vehicles scoured the streets for the bad guy. Lockdown Archive is comprised entirely of images that Mandel and Zakari pulled from the internet that were posted and re-posted by citizens and media alike to illustrate that day.

=== Mosaic tile public artworks (1993–2017) ===
Inspired by Barbara Jo Revelle's mosaic tile artwork, "A People's History of Colorado" (1991), Mandel and Sultan began to design mosaic tile artworks specifically for public sites. Beginning in 1993 they created six projects, but in 2000 Mandel took over this work on his own. Over a period of thirty years, he has transformed photographic imagery into large scale glass and porcelain tile mosaic murals. He has created artworks for 30 different commissions for venues as diverse as airports, police stations, university buildings, convention centers, federal buildings, sports arenas, public schools and transit stations from California and Washington to New York and Florida.

I did a piece for the Tampa International Airport where people are just sitting on an airplane. You have this sequential series of images of people sitting and just being quiet or reading. In public art, you expect something that’s very emblematic of the city— you know, you make some reference to how wonderful Tampa, Florida is as a destination—but in this case, I chose to focus on the experience of flying and, after 9/11, maybe how we are all a little bit more contemplative about what it means to get into an airplane. So I think that has a resonance to me that is a little more understated and meditative than some of the other pieces.

== Publications ==
=== Publications by Mandel ===
- Myself: Timed Exposures. Self-published, 1971.
- Seven Never Before Published Portraits of Edward Weston. Self-published, 1974.
- Baseball Photographer Trading Cards. Self-published, 1975. A set of 10 cards, randomly selected from a total of 135 different cards, with a stick of chewing gum. Edition of 3000 copies.
- SF Giants, an Oral History. 1979. ISBN 978-0918290038.
- Making Good Time. University of New Mexico, 1989. ISBN 978-0918290007.
- Good 70s. J&L, 2015. ISBN 978-0989531146. Edited by Mandel, Jason Fulford, and Sharon Helgason Gallagher. A boxed set of facsimiles of his early works (including Myself: Timed Exposures, Seven Never Before Seen Portraits of Edward Weston), and a full set of reprinted Baseball Photographer Trading Cards, and one pack of 10 cards from the original 1975 edition. Edition of 1000 copies.
- People in Cars. London: Stanley Barker in collaboration with Robert Mann Gallery, New York, 2017. ISBN 9780995555549.
- Boardwalk Minus Forty. Oakland, CA: TBW Books, 2017. Subscription Series #5, Book #1. ISBN 978-1-942953-28-9. Edition of 1000 copies. Mandel, Susan Meiselas, Bill Burke and Lee Friedlander each had one book in a set of four.

=== Publications paired with others ===
- How to Read Music in One Evening. Self-published, 1974. With Larry Sultan.
- Evidence. Self-published / Clatworthy Colorvues, 1977. With Larry Sultan. "Clatworthy Colorvues" was a fictitious name.
  - Reprint. New York: Distributed Art Publishers, 2003. ISBN 1-891024-62-0. 2017. ISBN 978-1942884149. With an introduction by Sandra S. Phillips and an afterword by Robert F. Forth.
- The Turk and the Jew. 18 Publications, 1998. With Chantal Zakari.
- The State of Ata. Boston, MA: Self-published / Eighteen, 2010. With Chantal Zakari. ISBN 978-0918290106.
- They Came to Baghdad. Boston, MA: Self-published / Eighteen, 2012. With Chantal Zakari. ISBN 9780918290113.
- Lockdown Archive. Boston, MA: Self-published / Eighteen, 2015. With Chantal Zakari.
- Shelter in Plates. 18 Publications, 2013. With Chantal Zakari. A set of commemorative plates referencing the Watertown Lockdown in 2013.

=== Publications with contributions by Mandel ===
- Larry Sultan and Mike Mandel. Walther König / Distributed Art Publishers, 2012. Edited by Thomas Zander. ISBN 978-1935202820. With essays by Charlotte Cotton, Jonathan Lethem, Constance M. Lewallen, Carter Ratcliff, and Thomas Wagner.
- Headlands: The Marin Coast at the Golden Gate. University of New Mexico, 1989. Collaboration with Miles DeCoster, Mark Klett, Paul Metcalf and Larry Sultan. ISBN 978-0826311528.

== Films ==
- Don Drowty The Famous (1971) – 13:54, video
- JPL (1978) – 12:48, 16 mm, collaboration with Larry Sultan

== Exhibitions ==
=== Solo exhibitions ===
- Making Good Time, 1990, UCR/California Museum of Photography, UC Riverside, CA
- Making Good Time, 1990, Opsis Foundation, New York
- Making Good Time, 1991, Blue Sky Gallery, Portland, OR
- Mike Mandel: Good 70s, 2017, Robert Mann Gallery, New York City; 2017, San Francisco Museum of Modern Art, San Francisco, CA.

=== Exhibitions with Larry Sultan ===
- Replaced, Darkroom Workshop, Berkeley, CA, 1975
- Evidence, San Francisco Museum of Modern Art, San Francisco, CA, 1977
- Evidence, Fogg Art Museum, Harvard University, Cambridge, MA, 1978
- Newsroom, Berkeley Art Museum and Pacific Film Archive, Berkeley, CA, 1983
- Evidence, Vassar College, Poughkeepsie, NY, 2004
- Evidence Revisited, Center for Creative Photography, University of Arizona, Tucson, 2004
- Larry Sultan & Mike Mandel Evidence Revisited, The Photographers' Gallery, London, 2005
- Larry Sultan / Mike Mandel – Evidence, Fotomuseum Winterthur, Winterthur, Switzerland, 2010
- Larry Sultan: Here and Home, Los Angeles County Museum of Art, 2014,
- Larry Sultan: Here and Home, Milwaukee Art Museum, 2015
- Larry Sultan: Here and Home, San Francisco Museum of Modern Art, 2017

=== Group exhibitions ===
- Photography in California: 1945-80, 1984, San Francisco Museum of Modern Art, San Francisco, CA
- Immateriaux, 1985, Centre Georges Pompidou, Paris, France
- Photography and Art: Interactions Since 1946, 1987, Los Angeles County Museum of Art, Los Angeles, CA
- Sprung in die Zeit, 1992–1993, Museum fur Moderne Kunst, Berlin, Germany
- Of Mice and Men, 2006, 4th Berlin Biennale for Contemporary Art, Berlin, Germany
- 75 Years of Looking Forward, 2009, San Francisco Museum of Modern Art
- Under the Big Black Sun, 2011, Museum of Contemporary Art, Los Angeles
- State of Mind: New California Art Circa 1970, 2012, UC Berkeley Art Museum, five additional venues Minneapolis Institute of Arts
- Ghosts In The Machine, 2012, The New Museum, New York City
- Larry Sultan: Here and Home, 2015, LACMA, Los Angeles, CA, Milwaukee Art Museum, Milwaukee, WI, 2017, SFMOMA
- Ordinary Pictures, 2016, Walker Art Center, Minneapolis, Minnesota
- Performing for the Camera, 2016, Tate Modern: Exhibition
- Materials and Objects, Tate Modern, London, 2017
- The Hobbyist, Fotomuseum Winterthur, Switzerland, 2017
- Art in the Age of the Internet, 1989 to Today, Institute of Contemporary Art, Boston, 2018
- Performing for the Camera, Tate Modern, London, 2016, included all 135 different Baseball Photographer Trading Cards.

== Permanent public art commissions ==
- High School, 1999, Skyview High School, Vancouver, WA
- Parking at the Courthouse, 2000, Tampa, FL
- Sitting Down at Rich's, 2001, Sam Nunn Atlanta Federal Center, Atlanta, GA
- Ramsay Cascades, 2002, Knoxville Convention Center, Knoxville
- Bridges, 2003, Richmond History Center, Richmond, VA
- Four Positions, Halftime Show, Masked Rider, Team Spirit, 2004, Jones SBC Stadium, Texas Tech University Lubbock, TX
- UTSA: Architectural Records; Histories, 2004, University of Texas, San Antonio
- Competition, Pitcher, Three Athletes, 2004, Florida Gulf Coast University Ft. Myers, FL
- Autzen Stadium Columns, 2004, Autzen Stadium, Eugene, OR
- 8th District Police Station, 2005, Chicago, IL
- Trade Street and 5th Street Walls, 2005, Spectrum Center, Charlotte, NC
- Passengers, 2006, Tampa International Airport Tampa, FL
- Washington Veterans Home, 2006, Retsil, WA
- In Flight, 2008, San Diego International Airport
- Glory Road Mosaic Murals, 2010, Sun Metro Station, El Paso, TX
- Western Heritage Parking Garage Murals, 2010, Will Rogers Memorial Center
- Seeing Blue, 2010, Chiawana High School, Pasco, WA
- Sidewalk Histories, 2010, Cambridge, MA
- Equestrian Multi-Purpose Center Murals, 2012, Will Rogers Memorial Center, Fort Worth, TX
- Taking Good Care, 2017, University of California, Davis, School of Veterinary Medicine

=== In collaboration with Larry Sultan ===
- Pool, 1993, deFremery Pool, Oakland, CA
- Rights, 1995, State Archives Building, Sacramento, CA
- Five Skaters, 1996, The Arena, San Jose, CA
- Waiting, 1999, San Francisco International Airport, San Francisco, CA
- High School, 1999, Skyview High School, Vancouver, WA
- Bulletin Board, 2000, Administration of Children's Services, New York, NY

== Temporary public art projects ==
=== Temporary public art projects with others ===
- Director, Radio Free Billboards, 1983 - Santa Cruz, CA community arts organization
- The Turk and the Jew, 1997-98 - web project, with Chantal Zakari
- Imagine, No Big Box, billboard, 2012, w/Chantal Zakari, Watertown MA
- Shelter-in-Plates, Shopify website for 6 ceramic plates, 2013–14, w/Chantal Zakari

=== Billboards in collaboration with Larry Sultan ===
- Berkeley Sheet Metal Works, 1973, Emeryville, CA
- Cornucopia, 1974, San Francisco, CA,
- Oranges on Fire, 1975, 10 locations in the San Francisco Bay Area & Santa Cruz, CA
- Sixty Billboards, (3 designs: Kansas, Alaska, Electric Energy Consumption) 1976, San Francisco Bay Area and Santa Cruz, CA
- Chicago Workshop, 1978, two billboards made with students of the School of the Art Institute of Chicago
- Ties, 1978, San Francisco, CA
- Whose News, 1980, San Francisco, CA
- They Came to Shoshone, 1980, Shoshone, ID
- Ooh La La, 1982, Boulder, CO
- You're So Easily Influenced, 1983, Mahwah, NJ
- We Make You Us, 1985–86, Seven locations nationally
- Japan, 1988, Los Angeles, CA
- White Corn Meal, 1989–90, Oakland, CA

== Awards ==
- National Endowment for the Arts, 1973 - Artists Fellowships in Photography
- National Endowment for the Arts, 1976 - Artists Fellowship in Photography, with Larry Sultan
- National Endowment for the Arts, Photography Fellowship, 1988 - Artists Fellowships in Photography
- National Endowment for the Arts, Washington, D.C., 1990 - Photography Fellowships Juror
- California Arts Council, Art in Public Buildings Program, 1990
- James D. Phelan Award, 1990 - Award in Photography
- Fulbright Fellowship, Turkey, 1997
- MacDowell Fellowship, 2002
- Paris Photo Book of the Year, Shortlist, 2015
- Anamorphosis Prize, Shortlist, New York, 2015
- Paris Photo Book of the Year, Shortlist, 2017

== Collections ==
Mandel's work is held in the following permanent collections:

- Addison Gallery of American Art, Andover, MA
- Art Institute of Chicago, Chicago, IL: 83 Baseball Photographer Trading Cards (1975) and 2 more items.
- Bibliothèque Nationale, Paris
- California Museum of Photography, UC Riverside, CA
- Center for Creative Photography, Tucson, AZ
- FotoMuseum Winterthur, Winterthur, Switzerland
- International Center for Photography, New York City
- The Jewish Museum, New York City
- Los Angeles Country Museum of Art
- MMK Museum fur Moderne Kunst, Frankfurt, Germany
- Morgan Library and Museum
- Museum of Fine Arts, Boston, MA
- Museum of Fine Arts, Houston, TX
- Museum of Modern Art, New York, NY
- National Gallery of Art, Washington, DC
- Nelson Adkins Museum, Kansas City, MO
- New York Public Library, New York, NY
- Norton Simon Museum
- San Francisco Museum of Modern Art, San Francisco, CA: JPL, Baseball Photographer Trading Cards, People in Cars, the Evidence installation, Myself: Timed Exposures, and Emptying the Fridge.
- Smithsonian American Art Museum
- Tate Modern, London, UK
- Washington's State Art Collection
