= Damiani =

Damiani is a surname, of Italian origin.

Notable people with the surname include:

- Victor Damiani (born 1970), American bassist
- Chip Damiani (1945–2014), American drummer
- Damiano Damiani (1922–2013), Italian screenwriter and film director
- Donatella Damiani (born 1958), Italian actress
- Elena Damiani (born 1979), Peruvian visual artist
- Ernesto Damiani, Italian scientist
- Felice Damiani (active 1584–1606), Italian painter
- Francesco Damiani (born 1958), Italian former boxer, first World Boxing Organization heavyweight champion
- José Damiani, president of the International Mind Sports Association, president of the World Bridge Federation for many years to 2010
- José Luis Damiani (born 1956), Uruguayan retired tennis player
- José Pedro Damiani (1921–2007), Uruguayan politician
- Juan Pedro Damiani (born 1958), Uruguayan lawyer
- Oscar Damiani (born 1950), Italian retired footballer
- Paolo Damiani (born 1952), Italian jazz cellist and double-bassist
- Peter Damian or Petrus Damiani (c. 1007–1072), Roman Catholic saint, cardinal and monk
