= Chantal Zakari =

Turkish-American artist

Chantal Zakari is an interdisciplinary artist, designer and art educator; a Turkish Levantine (and U.S. citizen) now residing in the Boston area.

She is a full-time faculty member at the School of the Museum of Fine Arts at Tufts, where she chaired the Graphic Arts area from 1998 until 2015, and was an active faculty voice while the SMFA was undergoing the transition in its long-standing affiliation with Tufts University. She was an associate member of the Goat Island performance group from 1995 to 2009 and has served on the board of Belmont World Film.

== Career ==
Zakari's studio practice freely combines research methodologies and artistic strategies borrowed from various disciplines such as photography, documentary, performance, storytelling, installation, graphic design and social interventions. According to her web site, Zakari draws upon contemporary social issues by making connections through personal narratives, history and popular culture.

Combining her skills as a graphic designer and an artist, Zakari's work often culminates in the form of an artist's book. One of her early projects was a diary The Turk and the Jew on which she collaborated with her husband Mike Mandel while he lived in Pullman, Washington and she in Chicago, Illinois. They used the web as a means to communicate daily and further explore their cultural differences, then published the diary as an artists' book in 1998.

The book webAffairs (2005) is a narrative, told in photographs and text, of Zakari's experience in virtual space. Using a pseudonym, she began a four-year-long performance and documentation of a webcam community where people meet to have virtual sex. The book comments on viewer's relationship to technology, the objectification of the body, personal surveillance tools and gender performativity.

For fifteen years, Zakari and Mandel collaborated on a body of work about the conflict between secularist culture and the Islamist movement in Turkey. Their journey, which began in 1997, resulted in photographic images, video interviews and public performances. In 2010 they published an encyclopedic artists' book, The State of Ata (2010) followed later by a conceptual exhibition 7 Turkish Artists.

Zakari and Mandel produced the book Lockdown Archive (2015) in response to the manhunt and lockdown of April 19, 2013, in their hometown of Watertown, Massachusetts. The couple designed and produced a series of commemorative porcelain plates "Shelter in Plates" depicting SWAT teams and heavy artillery near their home during the lockdown.

== Collections ==
Zakari's work is in the permanent collections at Yale University Library, Brooklyn Museum of Art, the Getty Research Institute library, The Kinsey Institute Library, Institute of Network Cultures in Amsterdam and the Addison Gallery of American Art.

== Exhibitions ==
She has had solo exhibitions in Boston, Baltimore, Atlanta, Los Angeles and also in Izmir and Ankara, Turkey.

Recent exhibitions include Relay, January 2017 and Strategic Planning, January 2018 at Kingston Gallery, Boston and Art in the Age of the Internet, 1989 to Today at the Institute of Contemporary Art, Boston, and Shelter in Plates at the Fitchburg Art Museum and at the Addison Gallery of American Art.
