= Nelva Weber =

American landscape architect (1908–1990)

Nelva Weber (1908–1990) was an American landscape architect and wrote extensively about landscape design. She opened her practice in 1945 in New York, NY. Prior to opening her own landscape architecture practice, she worked on the Palisades Parkway with C.C. Combs. She was also employed by the architecture firm Shaw Maess & Murphy and later as a designer on city parks for the New York City Parks Department.

== Life and career ==
Born in Arrowsmith, Illinois, Weber received her B.A. in English from Illinois Wesleyan University and later a B.F.A. in landscape architecture and a M.A. in plant ecology from University of Illinois in 1935. After graduation, Weber moved to New York City where, after several jobs, she worked for the New York City Parks Department before opening her own practice in 1945.

She was a contributor to Landscape Architecture magazine and The New York Times on landscape and horticulture from 1945 through the 1970s. She maintained an active practice, ran workshops and was the author of How to Plan Your Own Home Landscape: How to Organize Your Outdoor Space and How to Utilize It for Maximum Pleasure and Minimum Maintenance All Year Round. There is a book of her landscape plans edited by Ralph Bailey, Landscaping Plans for Small Homes Plans By Nelva M. Weber, Landscape Architect published in 1954.

Weber's daughter is the photography curator Sandra S. Phillips.

== Selected works ==
- Campus design for the Illinois Wesleyan University
- Campus design for Bard College, New York
- Purnell School, New Jersey
- Tree of Life Arboretum at Hancock Shaker Village, Pittsfield, Massachusetts
- First Congregational Church, Litchfield, Connecticut
- Saint Andrew's Episcopal Church St. Francis Memorial Garden, New Providence, New Jersey
- Mary Rockefeller estate
- Oscar de la Renta estate
