= Mimi Plumb =

American photographer

Mimi Plumb (born December 1953), also known as Mimi Plumb-Chambers, is an American photographer and educator, living in Berkeley, California. Plumb is part of a long tradition of socially engaged documentary photographers concerned with California. She has published three books, Landfall (2018), The White Sky (2020), and The Golden City (2021).

In 2015, she received a California Humanities Grant, alongside writer and historian Miriam Pawel, to develop a history exhibit featuring stories of California farmworkers organizing to cast secret ballots for the union of their choice. In 2017, Plumb received a John Gutmann Photography Fellowship for her project Teen Girls. In 2022, Plumb received a Guggenheim Fellowship in Photography for a project exploring the impact of climate change in California.

Plumb's work is held in the collections of San Francisco Museum of Modern Art, Daum Museum of Contemporary Art, Yale University Art Gallery, the Museum of Fine Arts, Boston, the Los Angeles County Museum of Art (LACMA), Pier 24 Photography, and the Deutsche Börse Photography Foundation.

== Life and work ==
Plumb was born in Berkeley, California and raised in Walnut Creek in the East Bay region of the San Francisco Bay Area in the 1960's, at a time and a place prone to drought, fire, and intense heat. She felt popular and idealized portrayals of suburbia didn't show her experience of growing up in a progressive family during the aftermath of the Cuban Missile Crisis. At 17, Plumb enrolled at the San Francisco Art Institute (SFAI) and began photographing the suburb she grew up in and other neighborhoods like it in Marin and Sonoma Counties. Her photographs focus on adolescents, the cycles of heat waves and drought, and ecological destruction. The work subsequently was published in the photo book The White Sky.

In 1974 and 1975, Plumb photographed in the Central and Salinas Valley of California, working with communities of farmworkers. Her photographs document young men living in farm labor camps, the daily work of children and adults side by side in fields, and the United Farm Workers Union (UFW) organizers. In the summer of 1975, a new California law allowed farmworkers the right to organize and vote for the union of their choice for the first time ever. Plumb followed UFW organizers who worked with Cesar Chavez to convince farmworkers of the importance of electing union representation through secret ballots. She photographed Chavez's "caminata", a 1,000 mile march from the Mexican border to the Central Valley calling on farmworkers to vote in the upcoming elections in the fields. Plumb's photographs don't focus solely on Chavez, or even the union offices. Rather, they focus on the farmworkers themselves.

She received her BFA in Photography in 1976 from the San Francisco Art Institute and received her MFA in photography from there in 1986.

In 2021, Amanda Maddox wrote about Plumb's work in Aperture saying:

"Her first monograph, Landfall, opens with a succinct statement that posits the consequential relationship between memory and fear: "I remember having insomnia for a time when I was 9 years old. My mother told me there might be nuclear war." Recurring events—the frequent duck-and-cover drills at school, countless nights spent worrying about her inability to sleep—helped perpetuate the terror she felt at the time. This fear resurfaced while Plumb was in graduate school at SFAI in the 1980s, prompting her to ask a question that propelled her: "How do you photograph a fear?" By then, her concerns had expanded to encompass the wars in Central America, the AIDS epidemic, and the danger that the Reagan administration posed for democracy. She ultimately identified the threat of climate change as the inspiration for Dark Days, a body of work made between 1984 and 1990 that, years later, was published, albeit fractionally, as Landfall."

Now retired, she taught photography for 28 years at San Jose State University in San Jose, California and for 10 years at the San Francisco Art Institute. Mimi Plumb is represented by the Robert Koch Gallery, San Francisco.

== Publications ==
- Landfall. Oakland: TBW, 2018. ISBN 978-1-942953-36-4.
- The White Sky. London: Stanley/Barker, 2020. ISBN 978-1-913288-19-8.
- The Golden City. Stanley/Barker, 2021. ISBN 978-1-913288-30-3.
- Megalith-Still. Stanley/Barker, 2023. ISBN 978-1-913288-56-3.
- The Reservoir. Oakland: Nazraeli, 2024. ISBN 978-1-59005-614-1.
- Lookout on Highway 74. One Picture Book Two #42. Oakland: Nazraeli, 2024. ISBN 978-1-59005-616-5.

== Awards ==
- 2015: California Humanities Grant alongside Miriam Pawel to create an online art and history exhibit called Democracy in the Fields, documenting the stories of farmworkers who supported Cesar Chavez in his July 1975 march from the U.S.A.- Mexico border and through the Salinas Valley.
- 2017: John Gutmann Photography Fellowship for her project Teen Girls
- 2022: Guggenheim Fellowship in Photography for a project exploring the impact of climate change in California.

== Exhibitions ==
=== Solo exhibitions ===
- What Is Remembered, Rayko Photo Center, San Francisco, 2016
- Pictures from the Field, Cal Humanities, Oakland, 2017/18
- Pictures from the Field, Sonoma Valley Historical Society, Depot Park Museum, 2019
- Landfall, Robert Koch Gallery, San Francisco, 2019
- The White Sky, Galerie Wouter Van Leeuwen, Amsterdam, 2021
- The White Sky, Robert Koch Gallery, San Francisco, October–November, 2021
- Blazing Light: Photographs by Mimi Plumb, High Museum of Art, February 6 – May 10, 2026

=== Group exhibitions ===
- The Valley/ElValle, Photo Essays from California's Heartland, San Francisco Arts Commission Gallery, 2014
- Looking Back: Ten Years of Pier 24 Photography, Pier 24, San Francisco, 2019/20
- Women Take the Floor: Personal and Political: Women Photographers, 1965-1985, Museum of Fine Arts, Boston, 2021
- Female Perspectives from Vivian Maier to Barbara Klemm, Art Collection Deutsche Borse, 2021/22

== Collections ==
Plumb's work is held in the following permanent collections:

- Daum Museum of Contemporary Art, State Fair Community College, Sedalia, Missouri: 6 prints (as of 31 October 2021)
- San Francisco Museum of Modern Art, San Francisco: 3 prints (as of 31 October 2021)
- Yale University Art Gallery, Yale University, New Haven, Connecticut
- Museum of Fine Arts, Boston, Boston Massachusetts
- Los Angeles County Museum of Art (LACMA), Los Angeles, California
- Pier 24 Photography Pilara Foundation, San Francisco, California
