= Bill Dane =

North American street photographer

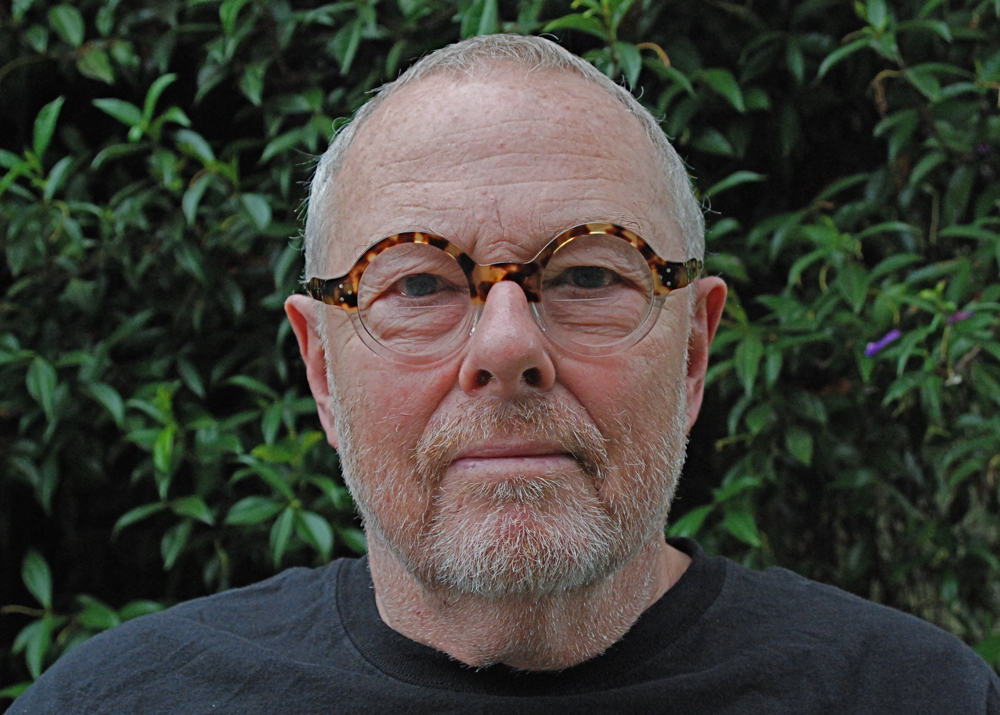
Dane, c.2010

Bill Dane (aka Bill Zulpo-Dane, born William Thacher Dane on November 12, 1938) is a North American street photographer. Dane pioneered a way to subsidize his public by using photographic postcards. He has mailed over 50,000 of his pictures as photo-postcards since 1969. As of 2007, Dane's method for making his photographs available shifted from mailing photo-postcards to offering his entire body of work on the internet.

== Education ==
Dane studied Political Science and Art/Painting at the University of California, Berkeley. He graduated with a BA in 1964, and a MA in Art/Painting in 1968. Dane painted for seven years before discovering photography in 1969. He worked with Diane Arbus and Lee Friedlander at Hampshire College in the summer of 1971.

== Photographic career ==
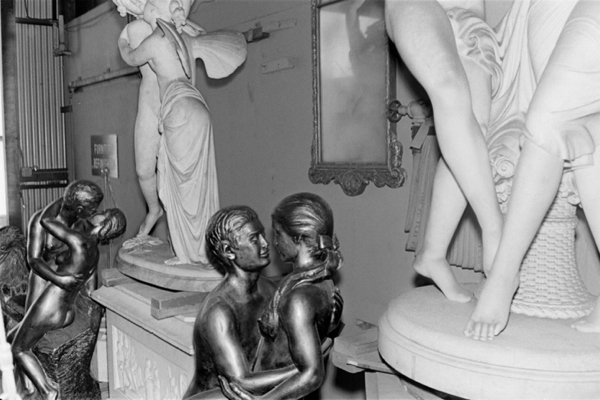
Universal City, 1974

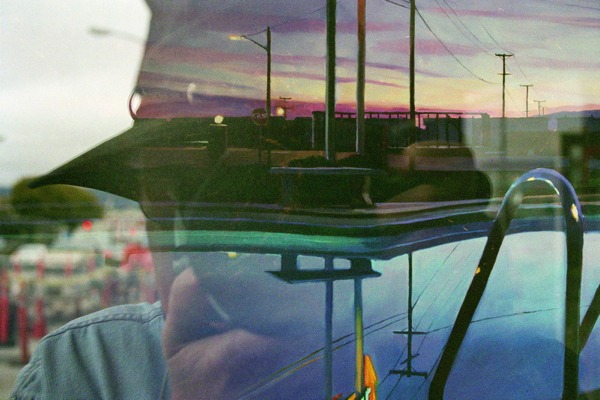
San Francisco, 2005

Dane was recognized by the John Simon Guggenheim Memorial Foundation with Guggenheim Fellowships in 1973 and 1982. He received Fellowships from the National Endowment for the Arts in 1976 and 1977. He used his grants to photograph inside and outside North America. The results of Dane's explorations have been viewed on his photo-postcards, in exhibitions, catalogs, books, magazines, and over the internet. Unfamiliar Places: A Message From Bill Dane was his seminal exhibit at the Museum of Modern Art in 1973. While Dane continues as a straight, still photographer working in public places, his pictures have evolved dramatically over time.

== Collections ==
Dane's photographs are held in the following permanent public collections:

- Amon Carter Museum, Fort Worth, TX
- Art Institute of Chicago, Chicago, IL
- Bibliothèque Nationale, Paris
- Fogg Museum, Harvard University, Cambridge, MA
- Madison Art Center, Madison, Wisconsin, WI
- Metropolitan Museum of Art, New York
- Museum of Fine Arts, Boston, MA
- Museum of Fine Arts, Houston, TX
- Museum of Modern Art, New York
- National Gallery of Art, Washington D.C.
- Oakland Museum, Oakland, CA
- Ohio State University Libraries, Columbus, OH
- Provincial Museum, Granada, Spain
- San Francisco Museum of Modern Art, San Francisco, CA
- Smithsonian American Art Museum / National Portrait Gallery Library, Washington, D.C.

== Reactions of notable critics ==
- A. D. Coleman: "Now, if I were a photographer myself, I would be deeply Insulted by this show. I would be insulted that an institution so prestigious and powerful as the Museum of Modern Art would present, as photographically exemplary, a collection of random snapshots by someone who has not even established enough craft competence to make his disregard of craft standards a significant esthetic choice."
- John Szarkowski: "It seems to me that the subject of Bill Dane’s pictures is the discovery of lyric beauty in Oakland, or the discovery of surprise and delight in what we had been told was a wasteland of boredom, the discovery of classical measure in the heart of God’s own junkyard, the discovery of a kind of optimism, still available at least to the eye."
- Patricia Bosworth: "In class [Diane Arbus] kept stressing the factual, the literal, the specificity inherent in photography. She loved Bill Dane’s postcard photographs of American landscapes."
- Diana Edkins: "The adequacy of meaning lies in what we recognize as the intensity of Dane’s human response."
- Ann Swidler: "A strain of American photography since Robert Frank has concerned itself with finding what is centrally American - attempting the great American novel in visual form." "The greatest American stories, like The Deerslayer, Huckleberry Finn, or Moby Dick, were boys’ stories, written for a culture which didn't want to grow up. Yet in their secret hearts, those stories were about evil and the kind of redemption that might come from confronting its mysteries." "Dane shows us not an exotic heart of darkness, but the American difficulty in dealing with what we cannot understand, own, or control." "Bill Dane's photographs seem to be about foreignness, both here and abroad. But they are really about us as Americans. They ask whether we can learn to love - not because alien worlds accommodate themselves to what we expect, but because we have learned to see even where we cannot understand."
- Jeffrey Fraenkel: "'What’s that?' is not an uncommon response for viewers confronting one of Bill Dane’s photographs. This is a curious question, given the fact that Dane approaches the 'real world' with his camera as squarely as Atget, Evans, or Friedlander. He photographs what exists, with no manipulation or fabrication."
- Sandra S. Phillips: "The vision of the world of Bill Dane, both inside and outside America, is often downright funny. But often, it is also a tragic vision. In his photographs are voltages, a disturbing strangeness."
- Bill Berkson: "Dane has cast himself as a surveyor of ceremonies stuck deep in our wishful, ornamental glut, our fuss."
