= Elena Damiani =

Peruvian artist (born 1979)

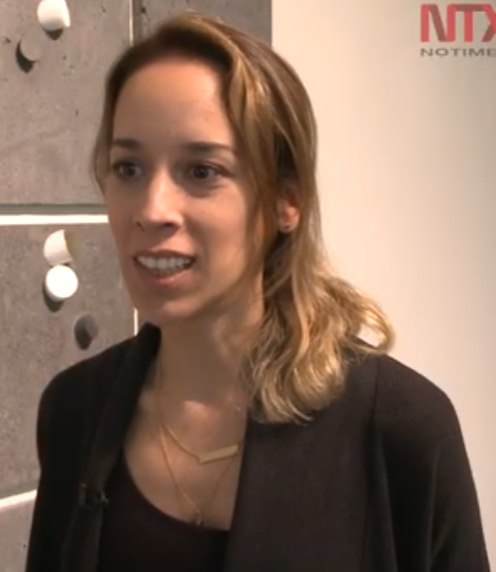
- In a Notimex video in 2019
- Born: 1979 (age 46–47); Lima, Peru
- Education: Peruvian University of Applied Sciences, Escuela Superior de Bellas Artes Corriente Alterna (BA), Goldsmiths, University of London (MFA)
- Occupation: Visual artist
- Known for: Sculpture, collage, installation art, video, photography
- Spouse: Erik Bendix
- Children: 1

Elena Damiani (born 1979) is a Peruvian visual artist, known for sculpture, collage, installation art, video, and photography. Her work explores cartography, geology, time, space, and archaeology. Damiani lives in Lima, and previously lived in London, and Copenhagen.

== Biography ==
Elena Damiani was born in 1979, in Lima, Peru, where she was also raised.

Damiani attended architecture classes from 1997 to 1999 at the Peruvian University of Applied Sciences in Lima. She transferred to the Escuela Superior de Bellas Artes Corriente Alterna in Lima, where she graduated with a B.A. degree in 2005. She continued her studies at Goldsmiths, University of London, and graduated with a M.F.A. degree in 2010. At Goldsmiths, she studied under Gerard Hemsworth and Suhail Malik.

In 2013, she married a Goldsmiths classmate and Danish artist, Erik Bendix, and they have one child. They had lived in Copenhagen for many years, and moved to Lima in 2016.

== Career ==
Damiani's first art exhibition was a two person show at Sala Luis Miró Quesada Garland in Lima. After graduation, she started working with Galería Vértice in Lima, where she had her first solo exhibition in 2007. She has only worked as an artist and never held another type of job, even in her early career.

In 2007, she was awarded the "Artist Award" by the French Embassy in Peru, but she asked to use the award to visit biennales and art fairs which they agreed. She was able to visit Paris for two weeks, followed by the Venice Biennale, Art Basel, and Documenta. From this experience she decided to live abroad, and study in London.

Damiani's work appeared in 2015 at the 56th Venice Biennale in Venice, Italy, representing Denmark. Her work was part of the main exhibition titled All The Worlds Futures, at the Venice Biennale in 2015, curated by Okwui Envezor.

Many of the images used in her series "Fading Fields" are older images sourced from the United States Geological Survey (USGS), they're reworked and contrasted with modern photographs of the same landscape taken by Damiani; these two images are collaged and displayed as installations. There is a comparison that happens between the landscape photography; there are differences between the historical U.S. scientist’s interpretation of the land, versus a modern point of view of someone from the local area. Her work forces viewers to rethink study of the landscape.

Damiani's artwork can be found in museum collections, including at the Museum of Modern Art in New York City; Museo Rufino Tamayo, in Mexico City; and Museo de Arte de Lima.

== Exhibitions ==
=== Solo exhibitions ===
- 2007, Sites, Galería Vértice, Lima, Peru
- 2012, History Decomposes Into Images, Not Into Narratives, Revólver Gallery, Lima, Peru
- 2015, Testigos: un catálogo de fragmentos (English: Witnesses: a Catalogue of Fragments), solo exhibition, National Autonomous University of Mexico (UNAM), Mexico City, Mexico
- 2016, Sedimentos: un conjunto de restos (English: Sediments: An Assemblage of Remains), solo exhibition, Museo Amparo, Puebla, Mexico
- 2017, In the Box: Elena Damiani's Dust Tail, solo exhibition, Chrysler Museum of Art, Norfolk, Virginia
- 2019, Great Circles, Galerie Nordenhake, Mexico City, Mexico
- 2022, Elena Damiani: Ensayos De Lo Sólido (English: Elena Damiani: Essays on the Solid), Museum of Contemporary Art of Lima, Lima, Peru; curated by Nicolás Gómez Echeverri
- 2023, Zenith, Americas Society, 680 Park Avenue, New York City, New York, United States
- 2023, Elena Damiani: One Earth, After Another, solo exhibition, Revolver Galería, 88 Eldridge Street, New York City, New York
