= Joel Sternfeld =

American fine-art color photographer (born 1944)

- Born: June 30, 1944 (age 82); Brooklyn, New York, U.S.
- Education: Dartmouth College
- Known for: Photography
- Notable work: American Prospects (1987); Walking the High Line (2001)
- Website: www.joelsternfeld.net

Joel Sternfeld (born June 30, 1944) is an American artist using photography, as well as an educator and writer. He is known for his large-format color photography of contemporary American life. His work contributed to the establishment of color photography as a respected artistic medium. Sternfeld’s photography follows in the tradition of Walker Evans and Robert Frank. His images are often imbued with a sense of beauty and melancholy, capturing moments of hope, despair, and tenderness. Since the publication of his landmark book American Prospects in 1987, Sternfeld’s photography has intertwined conceptual and political themes, reflecting his engagement with history, landscape theory, and the passage of time.

He teaches at Sarah Lawrence College in Yonkers, New York.

== Life and work ==
Sternfeld earned a BA from Dartmouth College. He began taking color photographs in 1969. He initially explored the application of Josef Albers' book Interaction of Colour (1963) to color photography. This study eventually led to the formal color scheme and images constructed with two or three pastel hues of equal density, a method rigorously adhered to in the body of work known as American Prospects.

He also examined the idea, described by historian and critic Lewis Mumford, that each era in history has its own characteristic color scheme. This notion was reflected in his work through his choice of pale pastel colors and the avoidance of primaries in American Prospects and subsequent projects, as he felt it represented a new pseudo-sophistication emerging in the United States.

== First Pictures (1969–1976) ==
Sternfeld began taking pictures in 1969 with a 35mm camera and Kodachrome slide film. These early pictures mark the beginning of his interest in documenting the American condition. They offer insight into the development of his color aesthetic, which eventually resulted in a new visual language for color photography—most notable in American Prospects. Sternfeld, along with other colorists like William Eggleston and Stephen Shore, was instrumental in the emergence of the medium.

First Pictures was published in 2021 by the Steidl publishing house. The book is composed of four distinct bodies of work: Happy Anniversary Sweetie Face!, Nags Head, Rush Hour, and At the Mall, New Jersey.

== American Prospects (1978–1984) ==
American Prospects, (first published in 1987, and reissued several times, most recently in 2023) is Sternfeld's most well-known work. It explores the complexity of human-altered landscapes in the United States and their possible meanings. He began working on the project in 1978 with the support of a Guggenheim Fellowship, and continued the work with a fellowship from the National Endowment for the Arts, followed by a second Guggenheim. Using a large-format camera, his photographs recall the traditions of 19th century photography, yet are applied to everyday scenes—such as a Wet 'n Wild waterpark or a suburban street in the South.

American Prospects was first exhibited at Daniel Wolf Gallery in 1980 to great acclaim. It was later shown at MoMA in a three-person exhibition, Three Americans, where Sternfeld presented his work alongside Robert Adams and Jim Goldberg

== Campagna Romana: The Countryside of Ancient Rome ==
In 1989, Sternfeld turned his attention to the Campagna Romana, the countryside surrounding the city of Rome. He chose this subject because he wished to suggest that great civilizations can fail—and that the Earth, as a place of civilization, is also vulnerable to collapse. This work represented an early artistic response to the advent of climate change. After being awarded a Prix de Rome Fellowship, he spent a year photographing the ruins around Rome within the context of modernity. The work also engaged with the painterly tradition that used these same ruins as the setting for Arcadia—a mythical time when humans lived in harmony and abundance with nature (despite the historical reality that the Roman countryside was, for two thousand years, a malaria-infested swampland, dangerous and largely uninhabited).

Campagna Romana was initially published in 1992 by the Knopf publishing house. The book Rome After Rome, published by Steidl, builds on Sternfeld's initial publication of his Rome work.

== On This Site: Landscape in Memoriam ==
On This Site: Landscape in Memoriam (first published with Chronicle Books in 1996, then with Steidl in 2012), is a collection of pictures from famous crime sites in America. The eerily normal locations are seemingly remains left behind after tragedies, their hidden stories disturbingly invisible. Next to each photograph is text about the events that happened at that location. On This Site highlights the importance of titles and accompanying text, using them extensively to establish context and invite the viewer's attention to the context of the image. The photographs themselves reveal little about their meanings. Since photographs can depict but not articulate, many images, especially documentary ones, often rely significantly on text to convey their full context.

On This Site was the subject of a one person show at the Art Institute of Chicago from December 14, 1996 to March 30, 1997.

== Hart Island a Potter's Field in New York City ==
From 1991 to 1994 Sternfeld worked with Melinda Hunt to document New York City's public cemetery on Hart Island, resulting in the book "Hart Island" (1998). In this work, Sternfeld examines Hart Island as a reflection of inequality within the American system, illustrated by the mass graves located there. The book also includes mixed media pieces and documentation of installations created with Hunt in collaboration with the Museum Stadthaus in Ulm, Germany.

== Stranger Passing ==
Initially published by Bulfinch in 2001, and then by Steidl in 2012, Stranger Passing consists of a series of portraits that have roots in his initial project American Prospects. Over a period of fifteen years Joel Sternfeld travelled across America and took portrait photographs that form in Douglas R. Nickel’s words an "intelligent, unscientific, interpretive sampling of what Americans looked like at the century’s end." Unlike historical portraits which represent significant people in staged surroundings, Sternfeld’s subjects are uncannily "normal": a banker having an evening meal, a teenager collecting shopping carts in a parking lot, a homeless man holding his bedding.

Using August Sander’s classic photograph of three peasants on their way to a dance as a starting point, Sternfeld employed a conceptual strategy that amounts to a new theory of the portrait, which might be termed "The Circumstantial Portrait".

Stranger Passing was featured in a solo exhibition at the San Francisco Museum of Modern Art (SFMoMA) from July 6 to October 2, 2001.

== Walking the High Line ==
In 2000, Sternfeld collaborated with Joshua David and Robert Hammond in their efforts to transform an abandoned elevated railroad track on Manhattan's west side into a public park. In an interview with the American Society of Landscape Architects, Hammond acknowledged Sternfeld's contribution, stating, "Josh and I think of him as the third co-founder because those photographs of the wild landscape are what really helped galvanize people." The photographs, published in 2001, were instrumental in garnering support for the project.

== Treading on Kings ==
Treading on Kings, published by Steidl in 2003, presents a photographic account of the 26th meeting of the Group of Eight (G8), a summit of leaders from the world's major industrialized nations, held in Genoa, Italy, in July 2001. Around four thousand journalists and photographers were present to cover the event, including Joel Sternfeld.

Sternfeld’s work focuses on the public demonstrations that took place alongside the summit. He photographed participants and occasionally recorded their statements, aiming to represent a range of perspectives expressed by individuals involved in the protests.

The context of the project was shaped by significant incidents during the summit, including the death of protester Carlo Giuliani and a police operation at the Armando Diaz School, where law enforcement confronted individuals staying at the Genoa Social Forum. These events drew international attention and influenced the urgency with which the surrounding circumstances were documented.

== Sweet Earth: Experimental Utopias in America ==
Published by Steidl in 2006, Sweet Earth presents sixty examples of historic and contemporary American utopias, pairing photographs of their housing with concise texts summarizing the communities' histories. The work highlights possibilities for sustainable living, a concept that resonates strongly in an era of growing concern about climate change and environmental challenges.

When Thomas More coined the term "utopia" in 1516, he joined a long-standing tradition of imagining ideal societies, a tradition that includes works like The Epic of Gilgamesh, Plato's Republic, and the Old Testament. His vision sparked a debate that evolved over centuries, with figures like Francis Bacon advocating for utopia through science and Jean-Jacques Rousseau envisioning harmony with nature. The onset of the Industrial Revolution, with its profound disruptions to daily life, added urgency to these discussions, as reflected in the writings of thinkers like David Owen, Karl Marx, and Friedrich Engels.

While many early theorists were European, America became fertile ground for utopian experimentation. Between 1810 and 1850, hundreds of secular and religious communities attempted to create ideal societies. This experimentation resurged in the 20th century, especially during the Vietnam War era, when communes proliferated. Some of these communities endure today, and new forms of experimentation, like co-housing developments and Ecovillages, have gained momentum in recent decades.

Joel Sternfeld’s Sweet Earth brings these diverse experiments into focus, offering both a visual and historical record. Each photograph is paired with a summary that distills the essence of the community's purpose and evolution. The book, blending photography and social history, reveals the shared aspirations of these communities and highlights the ongoing relevance of utopian ideals. At a time when market-driven forces dominate and environmental challenges mount, the vision of living harmoniously with nature and one another becomes increasingly compelling.

== When It Changed ==
When It Changed (published by Steidl in 2008) is a response to the rapidly damaging effects of climate change. Sternfeld attended the United Nations Conference on Climate Change in 2005. There he made a series of portraits documenting the politicians and attendants of the conference. Released as a book, the pictures are paired with examples of climate changes impacts, globally. The writing is interspersed with graphic teletype text that mimics the eroding language of the climate crisis.

== Oxbow Archive ==
Oxbow Archive (published in 2008 by Steidl) emerged as a response to Joel Sternfeld’s previous project, When It Changed. Still deeply engaged with the environmental crisis and the far-reaching consequences of climate change, Sternfeld returned to the landscape as his subject. Drawing inspiration from Thomas Cole’s iconic 1836 painting, View from Mount Holyoke, Northampton, Massachusetts, after a Thunderstorm (commonly referred to as The Oxbow), Sternfeld dedicated a full year to photographing the fields and terrain surrounding this distinctive bend in the Connecticut River.

Fascinated by the passage of time and the natural rhythms of the environment, Sternfeld approached the project as both a visual diary and a documentary archive. By capturing the subtle and dramatic transformations of the land through changing seasons, Oxbow Archive reflects on humanity’s relationship with nature, the persistence of place, and the fragile beauty of a world increasingly under threat.

== iDubai ==
Published in 2010 by Steidl, Sternfeld used an iPhone camera to document the shopping malls of Dubai, capturing the human dimension behind the city’s reputation as a symbol of advanced capitalism. The project explores the role of consumer culture in shaping modern life.

iDubai is part of a four-part cycle of work that began with Sweet Earth. The next installment, When It Changes, refers directly to Sweet Earth, suggesting that the “sweetness” of the Earth may not endure—that change is inevitable. This work considers landscapes as future archives, imagining how fields and fauna might look in 50 to 70 years due to climate change.

iDubai emerged from research for When It Changes, during which Sternfeld encountered the idea that even if humanity manages to address climate change, we might still exploit the Earth in other ways. This led him to Dubai, which he photographed as a prime example of global consumerism. The city’s landscape—where mega-malls sit next to mega-malls—embodies the global obsession with goods. The project isn’t intended as a critique of Dubai or the United Arab Emirates, but rather as a commentary on worldwide consumption, with Dubai serving as the sine qua non of that phenomenon.

There is also a conceptual dimension to the work: the photographs were taken with an iPhone, a device that symbolizes both modern convenience and physical limitation—what Sternfeld refers to as a kind of “embodied constraint.” The making of iDubai is documented in the film How to Make a Book with Steidl.

== Our Loss ==
Our Loss is Joel Sternfeld’s most recent project engaging with the climate crisis, following earlier works such as Oxbow Archive (2008) and When It Changed (2008). This series centers on a site in Brooklyn’s Prospect Park, where environmental activist and former civil rights attorney David Buckel died by self-immolation in April 2018. His final act was intended as a protest against ecological destruction and a call for greater environmental responsibility.

Buckel, known for his legal work in LGBTQ+ rights and his later involvement in sustainable farming, left a message explaining that the method of his death—using fossil fuels—was meant to highlight the damaging impact of humanity’s reliance on them.

Sternfeld happened to be in the park that morning with his young son. Moved by the event, he returned the next day and began photographing the slow, natural regeneration of the area. Rather than focusing on the tragedy itself, Our Loss reflects on the resilience of nature and the possibility of renewal in the face of environmental harm.

== Exhibitions ==
- 1976: Recent Color Photographs by Joel Sternfeld and Recent Work by Lois Johnson, Peale House Galleries, Pennsylvania Academy of the Fine Arts, Philadelphia, PA
- 1980: Daniel Wolf, Inc., New York, NY
- 1981: Larry Fink and Joel Sternfeld: Photographs, San Francisco Museum of Modern Art, San Francisco, CA
- 1981: The New Color, Everson Museum of Art, Syracuse, NY
- 1982: Joel Sternfeld, Blue Sky, Oregon Center for the Photographic Arts, Portland, OR
- 1984: American Prospects, Daniel Wolf, Inc., New York, NY
- 1984: Three Americans (Jim Goldberg, Robert Adams, Joel Sternfeld), Museum of Modern Art, New York, NY
- 1985: Joel Sternfeld, Higashikawa International Photo Festival, Higashikawa, Japan
- 1985: Joel Sternfeld, Dartmouth College, Hanover, NH
- 1985: New Color Photography, The Halsted Gallery, Birmingham, MI
- 1985: Joel Sternfeld, Afterimage Gallery, Dallas, TX
- 1987–1989: American Prospects: The Photographs of Joel Sternfeld, Museum of Fine Arts Houston, Houston, TX; Baltimore Museum of Art, Baltimore, MD; Detroit Institute of Arts, Detroit, MI; Museum of Contemporary Art, La Jolla, CA; The National Gallery of Canada, Ottawa, Canada
- 1989: Contemporary Photographs, Pace/MacGill Gallery, New York, NY
- 1991: Campagna Romana: The Roman Countryside, Pace/MacGill Gallery, New York, NY
- 1997: On This Site, Pace Wildenstein MacGill, Los Angeles, CA
- 2001: Stranger Passing, San Francisco Museum of Modern Art, San Francisco, CA
- 2001: Walking the High Line, Pace Wildenstein Gallery, New York, NY
- 2002: Treading on Kings: Protesting the G8 in Genoa, WhiteBox Art Center, New York, NY
- 2002–2003: Joel Sternfeld, The Photographers’ Gallery, London, United Kingdom
- 2004: American Prospects and Before, Luhring Augustine, New York, NY
- 2005: Sweet Earth: Experimental Utopias in America, Luhring Augustine, New York, NY
- 2008: The Geography of No Place: American Utopias, Buchmann Galerie, Berlin, Germany
- 2008: Oxbow Archive, Luhring Augustine, New York, NY
- 2009: Joel Sternfeld: On This Site, Buchmann Galerie, Berlin, Germany
- 2011: Joel Sternfeld – Farbfotografien seit 1970, Museum Folkwang, Essen, Germany.
- 2011–2012: C/O Berlin, Berlin, Germany
- 2011–2012: Joel Sternfeld – Color Photographs since 1970, Foam Fotografiemuseum Amsterdam, Netherlands.
- 2012: Joel Sternfeld – Color Photographs since 1970, Albertina, Wien, Austria.
- 2012: Joel Sternfeld: First Pictures, Luhring Augustine, New York, NY
- 2012: Joel Sternfeld: Campagna Romana, Buchmann Galerie, Berlin, Germany
- 2013–2014: Carnegie International, Carnegie Museum of Art, Pittsburgh, PA
- 2017: Joel Sternfeld: Colour Photographs 1977-1988, Beetles + Huxley, London, England
- 2017–2018: Joel Sternfeld: Stranger Passing / To Joseph Palmer, Buchmann Galerie, Berlin, Germany
- 2023-2024: Joel Sternfeld. American Prospects, Albertina Museum, Vienna, Austria
- 2025: Joel Sternfeld: On This Site, Riverside Art Museum, Riverside, CA, USA
- 2025: Joel Sternfeld, Hall Art Foundation, Reading, VT, USA
- 2025-2026: Breaking the Mold: Brooklyn Museum at 200, Brooklyn Museum, Brooklyn, NY, USA

== Awards ==
- 1978: Guggenheim Fellowship
- 1980: New York State Council for the Arts Creative Artist Public Service Fellowship
- 1980: National Endowment for the Arts Fellowship
- 1982: Guggenheim Fellowship.
- 1983: American Council for the Arts Emerging Artist Award
- 1985: Grand Prize, Higashikawa International Photo Festival, Japan
- 1987–1988: Shifting Foundation Fellowship
- 1990–91: Prix de Rome
- 2004: Citigroup Photography Prize, in association with The Photographers' Gallery, London
- 2013: Montgomery Fellowship, Dartmouth College
- 2017: Honorary Fellowship of the Royal Photographic Society, Bath, UK

== Publications ==
- Campagna Romana: The Countryside of Ancient Rome. New York, NY: Alfred A. Knopf, 1992. ISBN 978-0-67941-578-7.
- Hart Island. Zurich, Berlin, New York: Scalo, 1998. ISBN 978-3-931141-90-5. Includes a text by Melinda Hunt.
- Treading on Kings. Göttingen: Steidl, 2003. ISBN 978-3-88243-837-6.
- When It Changed. Göttingen: Steidl, 2008. ISBN 978-3-8652-1-278-8.
- Sweet Earth-Experimental Utopias in America. Göttingen: Steidl, 2008. ISBN 978-3-86521-124-8.
- Oxbow Archive. Göttingen: Steidl, 2008. ISBN 978-3-86521-786-8.
- iDubai. Göttingen: Steidl, 2010. ISBN 978-3-86521-916-9.
- First Pictures. Göttingen: Steidl, 2011. ISBN 978-3-86930-309-3.
- Walking the High Line. Göttingen: Steidl, 2012. ISBN 978-3-86521-982-4.
- On This Site: Landscape in Memorian. Göttingen: Steidl, 2012. ISBN 978-3-86930-434-2.
- Stranger Passing. Göttingen: Steidl, 2012. ISBN 978-3-86930-499-1.
- American Prospects. New York, NY: Distributed Art Publishers / Göttingen: Steidl, 2012. ISBN 978-3-88243-915-1.
- Rome After Rome. Göttingen: Steidl, 2018. ISBN 3958292631
- Landscape as Longing: Queens, New York. Göttingen: Steidl, 2017. ISBN 3958290329.
- Our Loss. Göttingen: Steidl, 2019. ISBN 978-3-95829-658-9.
- American Prospects. Göttingen: Steidl, 2023. ISBN 978-3-96999-229-6.
- Walking the High Line. Göttingen: Steidl, 2023. ISBN 978-3-95829-764-7.
- Nags Head. Göttingen: Steidl, 2024. ISBN 978-3-96999-318-7.

== Collections ==
Sternfeld's work is held in the following public collections:

- Museum of Modern Art, New York: 71 works (as of August 2023)
- J. Paul Getty Museum, Los Angeles, CA
- San Francisco Museum of Modern Art, San Francisco, CA
- Victoria and Albert Museum, London
- Whitney Museum of American Art, New York, NY
