= Sandra S. Phillips =

American writer and curator

Sandra S. "Sandy" Phillips (born 1945) is an American writer, and curator working in the field of photography. She is the Curator Emeritus of Photography at the San Francisco Museum of Modern Art. She joined the museum as curator of photography in 1987 and was promoted to senior curator of photography in 1999 in acknowledgement of her considerable contributions to SFMOMA. A photographic historian and former curator at the Vassar College Art Gallery in Poughkeepsie, N.Y., Phillips succeeded Van Deren Coke as head of one of the country’s most active departments of photography. Phillips stepped down from her full time position in 2016.

Peter Galassi, chief curator of photography at the Museum of Modern Art in New York City, said "I think she is one of the best photography curators that anybody has ever known."

== Life and work ==
Phillips' father was Joseph Sammataro, "an immigrant from Sicily who became a New York architect" and her mother was Nelva Weber, "a farmer's daughter from Illinois who became a well-known landscape architect and author." She grew up in New York's Upper East Side. She received a B.A. in art and art history from Bard College in Upstate New York in 1967, an M.A. from Bryn Mawr College in Pennsylvania in 1969, and a Ph.D. in art history in 1985 from City University of New York, where she specialised in the history of photography and American and European art from 1849 to 1940. Her Ph.D dissertation was on André Kertész.

She briefly taught history of photography at Mills College in Oakland, CA, and was a curator at the Vassar Art Gallery in Poughkeepsie, NY.

Phillips' earliest major project was the 1985 exhibition André Kertész: Of Paris and New York, organised by the Art Institute of Chicago and shown at the Metropolitan Museum of Art in New York City, in collaboration with the curators of those museums. She is interested in vernacular photography. Her SFMOMA exhibition Police Pictures: The Photograph as Evidence, "examined mug shots and crime scenes and was the first museum show of its kind." Exposed: Voyeurism, Surveillance, and the Camera Since 1870, co-curated with Simon Baker at Tate Modern, examined the voyeuristic aspect of photography; it premiered at Tate Modern in London and toured to SFMOMA and to the Walker Art Center in Minneapolis.

Phillips' first husband was Matt Phillips and her second is Stephen Vincent. She has a son, Joshua E.S. Phillips.

== Exhibitions curated by Phillips ==
- 1985: André Kertész: Of Paris and New York, The Art Institute of Chicago, and The Metropolitan Museum of Art [shown in NY 1986]. Co-organized with David Travis and Weston J. Naef.
- 1989: A History of Photography from California Collections, San Francisco Museum of Modern Art, CA.
- 1989: John Gutmann, San Francisco Museum of Modern Art, CA. Retrospective exhibition.
- 1991: Helen Levitt, San Francisco Museum of Modern Art, CA.
- 1992: Wright Morris: Origin of a Species, San Francisco Museum of Modern Art, CA.
- 1994: Dorothea Lange: American Photographs, San Francisco Museum of Modern Art, CA.
- 1995: William Klein New York 1954-1955, San Francisco Museum of Modern Art, CA.
- 1995: Commonplace Mysteries: Photographs by Peter Hujar, Andrea Modica and Bill Owens. San Francisco Museum of Modern Art, CA.
- 1995: Public Information: Desire, Disaster, Document, San Francisco Museum of Modern Art, CA. Collaborative effort with SFMOMA’s curators of media arts and painting and sculpture.
- 1995: Ansel Adams at 100, San Francisco Museum of Modern Art, CA. Curated with John Szarkowski
- 1996: Crossing the Frontier: Photographs of the Developing West, 1849 to the Present, San Francisco Museum of Modern Art, CA.
- 1997: Police Pictures: The Photograph as Evidence, San Francisco Museum of Modern Art, CA.
- 1997: Jim Goldberg: Raised by Wolves, San Francisco Museum of Modern Art, CA.
- 2003: Diane Arbus Revelations, San Francisco Museum of Modern Art, CA.
- 2004: Daido Moriyama: Stray Dog, San Francisco Museum of Modern Art, CA.
- 2004: Shomei Tomatsu: Skin of a Nation, San Francisco Museum of Modern Art, CA. Curated with Leo Rubenfien.
- 2004: Larry Sultan: The Valley, San Francisco Museum of Modern Art, CA.
- 2005: Taking Place: Photographs from the Prentice and Paul Sack Collection, San Francisco Museum of Modern Art, CA.
- 2005: Robert Adams: Turning Back, San Francisco Museum of Modern Art, CA.
- 2005: John Szarkowski, Photographs, San Francisco Museum of Modern Art, CA.
- 2006: Mexico as Muse: Tina Modotti and Edward Weston, San Francisco Museum of Modern Art, CA.
- 2006: Beyond Real: Surrealist Photography and Sculpture from Bay Area Collections, San Francisco Museum of Modern Art, CA.
- 2007: Henry Wessel, San Francisco Museum of Modern Art, CA.
- 2009: Face of our Time, San Francisco Museum of Modern Art, CA. Which included Yto Barrada, Guy Tillim, Judith Joy Ross and Leo Rubenfien,
- 2010: Exposed: Voyeurism, Surveillance and the Camera since 1870. San Francisco Museum of Modern Art, CA. Curated with Simon Baker.
- 2011: Face of our Time, San Francisco Museum of Modern Art, CA. Which included Jim Goldberg, Daniel Schwartz, Richard Misrach, Zanele Muholi and Jacob Aue Sobel
- 2012: Rineke Dijkstra: Retrospective, San Francisco Museum of Modern Art, CA.
- 2012: South Africa in Apartheid and After: David Goldblatt, Ernest Cole, Billy Monk. San Francisco Museum of Modern Art, CA. Retrospective exhibition.

== Publications ==
=== In conjunction with exhibitions curated by Phillips ===
- André Kertész: Of Paris and New York, London: Thames and Hudson, 1985. ISBN 978-0500541067 Co-authored with David Travis and Weston J. Naef.
- John Gutmann: Beyond the Document, San Francisco Museum of Modern Art, 1989. ASIN B00LSCF3O2
- Helen Levitt, San Francisco: San Francisco Museum of Modern Art, 1991. ISBN 978-0918471208
- Wright Morris: Origin of a Species, San Francisco Museum of Modern Art, 1992. ISBN 978-0918471246
- Dorothea Lange: American Photographs, San Francisco: Chronicle Books, 1994. ISBN 978-0811807258
- Public Information: Desire, Disaster, Document, an Francisco Museum of Modern Art, 1995. ISBN 978-1881616450
- Crossing the Frontier: Photographs of the Developing West, 1849 to the Present, San Francisco: Chronicle Books, 1996. ISBN 978-0811814201
- Police Pictures, San Francisco: Chronicle Books, 1997. ISBN 978-0811819848
- Daido Moriyama: Stray Dog, San Francisco: San Francisco Museum of Modern Art, 1999. ISBN 978-0918471505
- Shomei Tomatsu: Skin of the Nation, New Haven: Yale University Press, 2004. ISBN 978-0300106046
- Diane Arbus Revelations, Jonathan Cape Ltd, 2003. ISBN 978-0224071833
- Ansel Adams at 100, 2001. ISBN 978-0821225158
- Robert Adams: Turning Back, San Francisco: Fraenkel Gallery; New York: Mathew Marks Gallery, 2005. ISBN 978-1933045016
- Taking Place: Photographs from the Prentice and Paul Sack Collection, San Francisco: San Francisco Museum of Modern Art, 2005. ISBN 978-0918471789
- John Szarkowski: Photographs. New York: Bulfinch, 2005. ISBN 9780821261989.
- Henry Wessel. Göttingen: Steidl, San Francisco Museum of Modern Art, and Die Photographische Sammlung/SK Stiftung Kultur, 2007. ISBN 978-3865213914
- Exposed: Voyeurism, Surveillance, and the Camera Since 1870, New Haven: Yale University Press, 2010. ISBN 978-0300163438
- Rineke Dijkstra: A Retrospective, New York: Guggenheim Museum Publications, 2012. ISBN 978-0892074242
- American Geography: Photographs of Land Use from 1840 to the Present, Radius Books/SFMOMA, May 18, 2021. ISBN 978-1942185796

=== Writing contributions by Phillips ===
- Charmed Places: Hudson River Artists and their Houses, Studios and Vistas, New York: Harry N. Abrams, 1988. ASIN B01FEL4GTU
- Perpetual Motif: The Art of Man Ray, New York: Abbeville Press, 1988. ASIN B000NUKGOM
- Eyes of Time: Photojournalism in America, New York: New York Graphic Society, 1988. ISBN 978-0821216576
- About Face. San Francisco: Pier 24 Photography, 2014. ISBN 978-0-9839917-2-4. Exhibition catalog. Edition of 1000 copies. With forewords by Christopher McCall, and Richard Avedon (from In The American West), an introduction by Philip Gefter, and texts by Sandra S. Phillips, and Ulrike Schneider.

== Awards ==
- 2000: Resident at the American Academy in Rome
- 2000: Japan Foundation grant to study Japanese photography in Japan.
- 2013: Vision Award from the Center for Photography at Woodstock
