= Christian Patterson =

American photographer

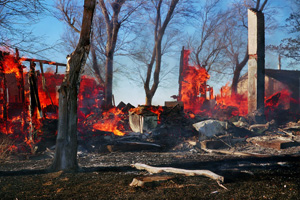
- Photograph from Christian Patterson's Redheaded Peckerwood series
- Born: 1972 (age 53–54); Fond du Lac, Wisconsin, U.S.
- Notable work: Sound Affects series Redheaded Peckerwood series
- Website: christianpatterson.com

Christian Patterson (born 1972) is an American interdisciplinary artist working primarily with photography, books, and installation. He is known for his books and exhibitions Sound Affects, Redheaded Peckerwood, Bottom of the Lake, and Gong Co. Redheaded Peckerwood was awarded the Rencontres d'Arles Author Book Award in 2012, a Guggenheim Fellowship in 2013, and the Vevey International Photography Award in 2015.

== Early life ==
Patterson was born in Fond du Lac, Wisconsin, USA.

== Biography ==
Patterson is a self-taught photographer. In 2002, he moved from Brooklyn, New York to Memphis, Tennessee to work with the photographer William Eggleston. From 2002 to 2005, Patterson lived in Memphis. In 2005, he completed his first project, Sound Affects, a collection of color photographs that explore Memphis as a visual and musical place, and use light and color as visual analogues to sound and music. In 2008, a Sound Affects book was published by Edition Kaune, Sudendorf.

In 2003, while driving from Memphis to New Orleans on Highway 61, Patterson discovered a Chinese-American grocery store in Merigold, Mississippi. The place would become the inspiration for a 20-year project, Gong Co.

In 2005, Patterson began working on his second project, Redheaded Peckerwood, which is inspired by the late 1950s killing spree of Charles Starkweather and Caril Ann Fugate across Nebraska. Photographs are the heart of this work, but they are complemented and informed by archival documents, hand-painted signs, shotgun-blasted paper boards, and readymade objects. Some of the documents and objects belonged to the killers and their victims, and were found in newspaper and governmental archives or found by Patterson when interviewing local residents or visiting former crime scenes. Later that same year, Patterson moved back to New York. From 2005 to 2011, he visited Nebraska five times, traveling the 500-mile path of the story.

In 2011, Redheaded Peckerwood was published by Mack, named one of the best photography books of the year by many critics, nominated for the 2012 Kraszna-Krausz Book Awards, and won the 2012 Recontres d'Arles Author Book Award. It is also featured in The Photobook: A History, Vol. 3, edited by Gerry Badger and Martin Parr. The second edition included an expanded booklet and there were differences in the printing, and the third edition introduced more changes to the booklet and added newly-sourced archival images.

In 2015, Bottom of the Lake was published by Koenig Books. The project revisits Patterson's hometown of Fond du Lac, Wisconsin (French for "Bottom of the Lake") and takes the form of a facsimile of his family's copy of the 1973 Fond du Lac Telephone Directory. Patterson added his own photographs, drawings, and marginalia to the book. Like Redheaded Peckerwood, this new work mixes large-format landscapes, appropriated and manipulated archival images, and studio still lifes. As an installation and exhibition, the work includes an interactive rotary telephone object and wooden sculpture.

In 2024, Gong Co. was copublished by TBW Books and Éditions Images Vevey. The work takes its inspiration from a Chinese-American grocery store in the Mississippi Delta whose shelves remained stocked with decades-old products.. Patterson has exhibited materials found in Gong Co., mixing his photographs with actual store ephemera.

== Publications ==
=== Publications by Patterson ===
- Sound Affects. Cologne: Edition Kaune, Sudendorf, 2008. ISBN 9783000245145.
- Redheaded Peckerwood.
  - Self-published, 2010.
  - Mack version. Essays by Lucy Sante and Karen Irvine. Includes three inserts, an illustrated booklet and (in the third edition) a facsimile postcard.
    - London: Mack, 2011. ISBN 978-1-907946-14-1.
    - 2nd edition. London: Mack, 2012. ISBN 978-1-907946-14-1.
    - 3rd edition. London: Mack, 2013. ISBN 978-1-907946-14-1. (Note: Although the ISBN has remained the same, Patterson made changes from the first edition to the second, and from the second to the third. "The changes in the editions of Redheaded Peckerwood are small enough to argue for either static or evolving photobooks".)
- Bottom of the Lake.
  - Oakland, CA: TBW Books, 2013. OCLC 861514425. Subscription Series #4, Book #1. Edition of 1500. Patterson, Alessandra Sanguinetti, Raymond Meeks and Wolfgang Tillmans each had one book in a set of four.
  - Berlin: Koenig, 2015. ISBN 978-3863357702.
- Gong Co.. TBW Books / Éditions Images Vevey, 2024. ISBN 978-1-942953-67-8.

=== Publications with others ===
- Lost Home. Tokyo: Super Labo, 2013. ISBN 978-4-905052-57-9. A slipcase containing a 24-page soft-bound book each by Harvey Benge, JH Engström, Roe Ethridge, Takashi Homma, Ron Jude, Daidō Moriyama, Christian Patterson, Slavica Perkovic, Bertien van Manen, Terri Weifenbach, and a 32-page prose poem by Nobuyuki Ishiki. Japanese and English text. Edition of 1000 copies, 200 with a white cover and 800 with green.
- AP CP BL – Ahorn Paper 1, Christian Patterson, Bottom of the Lake. Berlin: Ahorn Books, 2016. ISBN 978-3-946707-00-4. Contains two interviews with Patterson and contributions by Gerry Badger, Thomas Weski, and Lucy Sante. 144 pages.

== Solo exhibitions ==
- Another Time, Another Place, and You, Southside Gallery, Oxford, MS, 2003
- Sound Affects, Power House, Memphis, TN, 2005; Yancey Richardson Gallery, New York, NY, 2006
- Sound Affects, Robert Koch Gallery, San Francisco, CA, 2007
- Sound Affects, Kaune, Sudendorf Contemporary, Cologne, Germany
- Sound Affects & Redheaded Peckerwood, Robert Morat Galerie, Hamburg, Germany, 2012
- Redheaded Peckerwood, Robert Morat, Berlin, Germany, 2012
- Redheaded Peckerwood, Rose Gallery, Santa Monica, CA, 2013
- Redheaded Peckerwood, Transformer Station, Cleveland, OH, 2014
- Bottom of the Lake, Robert Morat Galerie, Berlin, Germany, 2015
- Gong Co., Festival Images, Vevey, Switzerland, 2016.
- Gong Co., Robert Morat Galerie, Berlin, Germany, 2025

== Awards ==
- 2012: Rencontres d'Arles Author Book Award for Redheaded Peckerwood
- 2013: Guggenheim Fellowship
- 2015: Vevey International Photography Award, Vevey, Switzerland.
- 2025: Pollock-Krasner Foundation Grant
