= Terri Weifenbach =

American photographer

Terri Weifenbach is an American fine-art photographer, living in Paris. She has published a number of books of landscape photography, often of plants and animals, gardens and parks. Her work is held in the collections of the Center for Creative Photography in Tucson and North Carolina Museum of Art. She is the recipient of a Guggenheim Fellowship.

== Life and work ==
Weifenbach was born in New York City and raised in Washington, D.C. She graduated from the University of Maryland, College Park in 1978. Since then she has lived in New Mexico, California and again in Washington, D.C., and now lives in Paris.

Weifenbach photographs plants and animals and "uses the richness of gardens and parks as the site for her landscape images". Bookmaking is central to her artistic practice. Parr and Badger include In Your Dreams (1997) in the second volume of The Photobook: A History.

She worked as a photographic printer from 1983 to 2006. She was married to John Gossage for 14 years, from 1992.

== Publications ==
=== Books by Weifenbach ===
- In Your Dreams. Tucson: Nazraeli, 1997. With an essay by Robert Adams. Edition of 250 copies. A monograph.
  - Second edition. Tucson: Nazraeli, 1998. Edition of 1000 copies.
  - Third edition. Tucson: Nazraeli, 2000.
- Instruction Manual No. 1. Tucson: Nazraeli, 2000.
- Hunter Green. Tucson: Nazraeli, 2000. With an essay by Yayako Uchida. A monograph.
- Instruction Manual No. 2. Portland: One Picture Book #3. Nazraeli, 2001.
- Instruction Manual No. 3. Portland: One Picture Book #4. Nazraeli, 2001.
- Lana. Portland: Nazraeli, 2002.
- Politics of Flowers. Onestar, 2005.
- Another Summer. Thunderstorm, 2009.
- Some Insects. One Picture Book #67. Portland: Nazraeli, 2010.
- 17 Days. Super Labo, 2012.
- Between Maple and Chestnut. Portland: Nazraeli, 2012.
- Stilll. Super Labo, 2013.
- Centers of Gravity. Onestar, 2017. With text by Matthew Dickman. A book with 10 prints.
- Des oiseaux = On birds. Paris: Xavier Barral, 2019. One in a series, each of which is called Des oiseaux. With an essay by Guilhem Lesaffre.
- Cloud Physics. Paris: EXB / Ice Plant, 2021. English and French editions.

=== Books with others ===
- Snake Eyes. With John Gossage. Berlin/Washington D.C.: Loosestrife, 2002. With an essay by Gossage. Edition of 500 copies.
- Hidden Sites. Nooderlicht, 2005. With Machiel Botman, Andreas Gefeller, and Marco Wiegers.
- Lost Home. Tokyo: Super Labo, 2013. ISBN 978-4-905052-57-9. A slipcase containing a 24-page soft-bound book each by Harvey Benge, JH Engström, Roe Ethridge, Takashi Homma, Ron Jude, Daidō Moriyama, Christian Patterson, Slavica Perkovic, Bertien van Manen, Weifenbach, and a 32-page prose poem by Nobuyuki Ishiki. Japanese and English text. Edition of 1000 copies, 200 with a white cover and 800 with green.
- Gift. Amana, 2014. A Volume each by Weifenbach and Rinko Kawauchi.

== Awards ==
- 2015: Guggenheim Fellowship from the John Simon Guggenheim Memorial Foundation to work on Cloud Physics

== Collections ==
- Center for Creative Photography, Tucson, Arizona
- North Carolina Museum of Art, Raleigh, North Carolina: 1 print (as of 9 January 2022)
