= Thomas Tulis =

American photographer and painter

- Born: 1961 (age 63–64); Chattanooga, Tennessee, U.S.
- Occupations: Photographer; painter
- Website: thomastulis.com

Thomas Tulis (born 1961) is an American photographer and painter living and working in Atlanta, Georgia.

== Life and work ==
Tulis was born in Chattanooga, Tennessee. After a couple of years of college, he joined the United States Army. After the army he put all of his time and efforts into his art. In 1985 he was able to open his first studio and that same year had his first exhibition. He lives a very simple life.

In 1997, Tulis was Artist in Residence at Pouch Cove Foundation, a self-sustaining, not for profit art retreat near St. John's, Province of Newfoundland and Labrador.

== Group exhibitions ==
- Tulis exhibited in the experimental art space Neo-Post-Now Gallery in Manitowoc, Wisconsin from 1992 to 1997.
- The South by its Photographers, Birmingham Museum of Art, Birmingham, Alabama; Columbia Museum of Art, Columbia, South Carolina; Louisiana Center for Arts and Sciences, Baton Rouge, Louisiana. Curated by Ellen Fleurov. With work by various Southern artists including Tulis, Shelby Lee Adams, Walter Beckham, Debbie Fleming Caffery, William Christenberry, Chip Cooper, William Greiner, Birney Imes, Melissa Springer and others. This exhibition was also made into a book by Susan Sipple Elliott, with an introduction by John E. Schloder.
- House: Ten Artists Photograph Domestic Architecture, Athens Institute for Contemporary Art, 2002. With work by Tulis, Evie McKenna, Rinnie Allen, Michael Stipe, Carl Martin, and Mark Steinmetz. Curated by Carol John.
- Wait Until Dark, Williams College Museum of Art, Fresno, California, 2003. With work by Tulis, Lewis Baltz, Harvey Caplin, Todd Hido, David Leventhal, William Greiner, Michael Kenna, O. Winston Link, Richard Misrach, Jules Shulman, George Tice and Henry Wessel, Jr. selected from the photography collection of Jay Richard DiBiaso.
- So Atlanta: Artists Respond to the Contemporary City, 2004. With work by Tulis, Karen Rich Beall, Sarah Doughrety, Samm Hill, Ron Jude, Ohm Phanphiroj and others. Curated by Felicia Feaster and Helena Reckitt.
- The Contemporary, Atlanta.

== Collections ==
Tulis' work is held in the following permanent collections:

- Brooklyn Museum of Art, Brooklyn, NY
- High Museum of Art, Atlanta, GA
- Indianapolis Museum of Art, Indianapolis, Indiana, IN: 3 prints (as of 24 April 2022)
- Museum of Fine Arts, Houston, TX: 1 print (as of 24 April 2022)

== Quotes ==
"Two hundred and fifty images laid before me and I was enthralled. They were perfect. I wished I used more of them. The photography brought a sense of presence, of immediacy and of realism to a space that I knew would soon be awash in metaphors within a visionary frame." – Steven Guynup

== Publications ==
- The South By Its Photographers. by Susan Sipple Elliott. University Press of Mississippi, 1996. ISBN 0-87805-954-7. Photographs by 48 Southern photographers. 68pgs. With an introduction by John E. Schloder.
- New Life: Stories and Photographs from the Suburban South. By Alex Harris. W. W. Horton, 1996. ISBN 978-0-393-04030-2. 249pgs.
