= John Gossage =

American photographer

John Gossage (born 1946) is an American photographer, noted for his artist's books and other publications using his photographs to explore under-recognised elements of the urban environment such as abandoned tracts of land, debris and garbage, and graffiti, and themes of surveillance, memory and the relationship between architecture and power.

== Life and career ==
Gossage was born in Staten Island, New York City in 1946 and at an early age became interested in photography, leaving school at 16 and taking private instruction from Lisette Model, Alexey Brodovitch and Bruce Davidson. He later moved to Washington, D.C. to study, and subsequently received a grant from the Washington Gallery of Modern Art which allowed him to remain in the city and refine his photographic technique. He has shown his photographs in solo and group exhibitions since 1963.

After a number of years with Nazraeli Press his usual publisher is now Loosestrife Editions and Steidl.

In 2010, Steidl published Gossage's The Thirty-Two Inch Ruler / The Map of Babylon, two companion volumes bound together that feature his first ever published photographs in color. The Thirty-Two Inch Ruler features a neighborhood in which he lives, populated by ambassadorial residences, embassies and the lavish private homes of those who are in positions of power and influence in Washington, D.C., and was prompted by the arrival of a new neighbor, then-Secretary of Defense Donald Rumsfeld. Over the same year, Gossage took photographs abroad, including in Germany and China, which are published in Map of Babylon.

He has taught at the University of Maryland, College Park and curated several photographic exhibitions. He lives and works in Washington, D.C.

== Publications ==
=== Publications by Gossage ===
- Gardens. Hollow Press; Castelli Graphic, 1978. OCLC 469696510. Text selected by Walter Hopps.
- The Pond.
  - New York: Aperture, 1985. ISBN 9780893812065. With an essay by Denise Sines. Edition of 2000 copies.
  - New York: Aperture, 2010. ISBN 9781597111324. With a preface by Toby Jurovics and an essay by Gerry Badger.
- Stadt des Schwarz. Loosestrife, 1987.
- LAMF: Three Days in Berlin 1987. Self-published, 1988.
- There and Gone. Nazraeli, 1997.
- The Things that Animals Care About. Tucson, AZ: Nazraeli, 1998.
- Empire. Nazraeli, 2000.
- Four American Photographs. Nazraeli, 2000. One Picture Book 2. ISBN 3-923922-93-0.
- Hey Fuckface!. Tucson, AZ: Nazraeli, 2000. ISBN 9783923922789. With a pamphlet by Gus Blaisdell containing an essay taken from "Obscenity in Thy Mothers Milk," and a single page interview of Gossage by Peter Lloyd. Edition of 100 copies. "19 original silver gelatin prints with hand written curses mounted on rag board, housed in a wood and plexiglass box by Yachio-shi." A study of Environmental Protection Agency-listed hazardous waste sites in and near Staten Island and Syracuse, New York.
- Romance Industry. Nazraeli, 2002.
- Dance Card Vol. 2. One Star Press, 2003.
- Berlin in the Time of the Wall. 2004. Images taken during more than twenty years of study of Berlin.
- Putting Back the Wall. Loosestrife, 2007. ISBN 978-0975312032.
- 13 Ways to Miss a Train. Linea di Confine, 2004.
- Secret of Real Estate. Sheldon Art Galleries, 2008.
- The Absolute Truth. Tokyo: Super Labo, 2011. Edition of 500 copies.
- Eva’s Book. Tokyo: Super Labo, 2011. ISBN 978-4-905052-29-6. Edition of 500 copies.
- Here. Rochester Art Center, 2010.
- A Few Years With a Telecaster. Harper's books, 2010.
- The Thirty Two Inch Ruler: Map of Babylon. Göttingen: Steidl, 2010. ISBN 978-3865217103.
- Waking in Warhol’s Bed. Kehrer, 2010.
- The Auckland Project. Radius, 2011.
- The Actor. Loosestrife, 2012.
- She Called me by Name. Loosestrife, 2012.
- The Code. Harper's Books 2012.
- Pomodori a Grappolo. Radius, 2014.
- Who Do You Love. Fraenkel Gallery, 2014.
- Nothing. Waltz Books, 2015.
- Hey Fuckface (bootleg). Horses Think Press, 2015. With texts by Gus Blaisdell and Peter Lloyd.
- A Dozen Failures. TIS (This Is Sausage), 2016. ISBN 9781943146086. Edition of 700 copies.
- Looking up Ben James: A Fable. Göttingen: Steidl, 2016. ISBN 978-3-86930-589-9.
- Jack Wilson's Waltz. Göttingen: Steidl, 2019. ISBN 978-3-95829-547-6.
- Should Nature Change. Göttingen: Steidl, 2019.
- The Nicknames of Citizens. Göttingen: Steidl, 2020.

=== Publications with others ===
- America, 2006. Photographs by Obvious & Ordinary. Chicago: Stephen Daiter Gallery; London: Rocket Gallery, 2007. By Martin Parr ("Obvious") and Gossage ("Ordinary"). Edition of 1500 copies.
- One Day: 10 Photographers. Heidelberg: Kehrer, 2011. ISBN 978-3-86828-173-6. A boxed set of ten books of photographs taken on 21 June 2010. Edited by Harvey Benge, each book by one of Gossage, Alec Soth, Jessica Backhaus, Gerry Badger, Benge, Todd Hido, Rob Hornstra, Rinko Kawauchi, Eva Maria Ocherbauer and Martin Parr.
- Snake Eyes. Washington D.C.: Loosestrife, 2002. With Terri Weifenbach. Edition of 500 copies.
- The Auckland Project. Santa Fe, NM: Radius, 2011. ISBN 978-1-934435-26-7. Photographs by Gossage and Alec Soth. Two volume hardbound in slipcase.

== Exhibitions ==
- John Gossage: The Pond, Smithsonian American Art Museum, Washington, D.C., 2010/2011
- The Thirty Two Inch Ruler: Map of Babylon, World Photography Festival and Sony World Photography Awards Exhibitions, World Photography Organisation, Somerset House, London, 2011.
- Three Routines, Art Institute Chicago, 2015.

== Collections ==
Gossage's work is held in the following public and private permanent collections:

- Museum of Modern Art, New York
- Corcoran Gallery of Art, Washington, DC
- Art Institute of Chicago, Chicago, IL
- Canadian Centre for Architecture, Montreal
- Menil Collection, Houston
