= Raymond Meeks =

American photographer

Raymond Meeks (born 1963) is an American photographer. "Much of his work focuses on memory and place, and captures daily life with his family." He has published a number of books including Pretty Girls Wander (2011) which "chronicles his daughter's journey from adolescence to adulthood"; and Ciprian Honey Cathedral (2020), which contains symbolic, figurative photographs taken in and around a new house, and of his partner just before waking from sleep. Meeks is co-founder of Orchard Journal, in which he collaborates with others.

In 2016 he received a Siskind Fellowship Grant from the Aaron Siskind Foundation and a 2020 Guggenheim Fellowship. His work is held in the collections of the Bibliothèque nationale de France in Paris, the National Gallery of Art (Washington, DC), Light Work in Syracuse, NY, and the Museum of Fine Arts, Houston.

== Life and work ==
Meeks was born in Columbus, Ohio. He has lived in Providence, Rhode Island and the Catskill Mountains, New York. He once had a career as a commercial photographer, travelling all over the U.S. "to photograph anonymous hotel rooms".

"Much of his work focuses on memory and place, and captures daily life with his family." Pretty Girls Wander (2011) "chronicles his daughter's journey from adolescence to adulthood." Ciprian Honey Cathedral (2020) contains symbolic, figurative photographs taken in and around a new house, and of his partner just before waking from sleep. Vince Aletti, wrote in Photograph Magazine, that "he finds a certain harsh beauty in its [Providence, Rhode Island's] wastelands that allies him with the best of the New Topographics crew." Parr and Badger include Meeks, along with Mark Steinmetz, Susan Lipper, Gregory Halpern, Deborah Luster, Ron Jude and Doug Rickard, in "an interesting new generation of US photographers – post-New Topographical, one might call them . . . they are quixotic and individualistic, and are looking at America's heartland with a collective fresh eye informed by both the country's photographic heritage and a strong desire to tell American stories at a time when the country seems unsure of itself."

Meeks says about his practice: “I’ll work for a while making pictures, most often within walking distance of my backyard—observations and occurrences that make up the fabric of daily life, so that I make work where I find myself wanting to spend time with a person or a subject, oftentimes dictated by the type of experiences that I want to have in the world. I’m not a prolific photographer. I don’t always have a camera on me. I spend more time without a camera, in part because the moment I have a camera, the thing I’m interested in eludes me—I don’t see it. I have to experience it without a camera first, and then hope that there’s some semblance of it when I go back to photograph that can capture what drew me towards it the first time. I’m really slow to visually organize and make sense of things, so I have to experience the things I’m drawn to a lot—quite frequently—before I can photograph, which is why I end up photographing close to home, because it’s a subtle feature in a landscape I drive past the hundredth time that finally informs a picture.”

Meeks often self-publishes limited edition handmade artist's books under the name Dumbsaint Editions; these artist’s books are “raw and improvisational objects, sometimes housed in casings fashioned from foam core and strips of wood, sometimes comprising loose leaves bound together with adhesive tape, or filled with pages on which prints are made on the back of pages stripped from other books.”

Meeks is co-founder of Orchard Journal, in which he collaborates with some of his contemporaries. Parr and Badger include Orchard Volume 1: Crime Victims Chronicle, by Meeks and Luster, in the third volume of their photobook history.

== Publications ==
=== Publications by Meeks ===
- Sound of Summer Running. Tucson: Nazraeli, 2004. Photographs by Meeks, text by Rick Bass. ISBN 978-1590051122. Accompanied by a booklet of poetry with the same title by Forrest Gander. Edition of 50 copies.
- A Clearing. Portland: Nazraeli, 2008. ISBN 978-1590051641. Edition of 500 copies
- Doctrine of an Axe. One Picture Book 54. Portland: Nazraeli, 2008. ISBN 978-1590052365. Eight reproductions and one original photograph. Includes on a separate leaf the poem "The doctrine of an axe" by Maurice Manning. Edition of 500 copies.
- Middle Air. Self-published / Dumbsaint, 2009. Edition of 40 copies.
- Carousel. Self-published / Dumbsaint, 2009. Two editions of 60 copies total.
- Nevermore. Self-published, 2008. OCLC 712654517. With a poem by Kazimir Malevich. Edition of 25 copies.
- Amwell | Continuum. Portland: self-published / Dumbsaint, 2010. OCLC 621042616.
- Who Will Stay. Portland: self-published / Dumbsaint, 2010. OCLC 793519936.
- Amwell. Portland: Nazraeli, 2010. Nazraeli Press Six by Six, Set 1 v. 3. ISBN 9781590052969. Edition of 100 copies.
- Pretty Girls Wander. Portland: self-published / Dumbsaint, 2011.
- 2 Solitudes. Self-published / Dumbsaint, 2013. OCLC 855114097. Edition of 40 copies.
- Erasure. Oakland, CA: TBW, 2013. Subscription Series #4, Book #3. OCLC 888824695. Edition of 1500 copies. Meeks, Christian Patterson, Alessandra Sanguinetti and Wolfgang Tillmans each had one book in a set of four.
- Contact Sheet 179: Raymond Meeks. Syracuse: Light Work, 2014.ISBN 978-0935445916. Includes a conversation between Meeks and Shane Lavalette.
- In Love with Drama. Self-published / Dumbsaint, 2015. Edition of 8 copies.
- Winter Farm Auction 1.2016 Mt Gilead, Ohio. Self-published / Dumbsaint, 2016. Folio of six broadsides. Edition of 10 copies.
- Halfstory Halflife. Paris: Chose Commune, 2018. ISBN 979-10-96383-08-5.
- Ciprian Honey Cathedral. London: Mack, 2020. ISBN 978-1-913620-01-1.
- Somersault. London: Mack, 2021. ISBN 978-1-913620-40-0.
- The Inhabitants. London: Mack; France: Fondation d'entreprise Hermès, 2023. With poetry by George Weld. ISBN 978-1-915743-15-2.

=== Collaborative publications ===
- Orchard Volume 1: November 2010: Deborah Luster: Crime Victims Chronicle. New York: Silas Finch, 2010. By Meeks and Deborah Luster. Three editions of 200 copies total. ISBN 978-1936063116. "Photographs taken by Meeks while assisting Luster in New Orleans with text excerpted from A Crime Victims Guidebook by Rose Preston, and a portfolio of images from Luster's body of work Tooth for an Eye." With a text by Kevin Sullivan.
- Orchard Volume 2: Not Seen | Not Said: Wes Mills. New York: Silas Finch, 2011. Photographs by Meeks, drawings by Wes Mills. Three editions of 200 copies total.
- Orchard Volume 3: Idyll: Mark Steinmetz. New York: Silas Finch, 2011. One body of work by each of Meeks and Mark Steinmetz. Three editions of 200 copies total.
- Dumbsaint 01: Township. TIS/dumbsaint. Brooklyn: Tis, 2017. Photographs by Meeks, Adrianna Ault and Tim Carpenter. Short story by Brad Zellar. Two editions of 750 copies total.

=== Publications with contributions by Meeks ===
- Core Samples from the World. New York: New Directions, 2011. By Forrest Gander. ISBN 978-0811218870. Poetry and essays by Gander, photographs by Meeks, Graciela Iturbide and Lucas Foglia.
- Contact Sheet 172: Light Work Annual 2013. Syracuse: Light Work, 2013. ISBN 978-0935445848.

== Exhibitions ==
- Light Work, Syracuse, NY, November–December 2014. An exhibition of Meeks' work throughout his career".
- Raymond Meeks: Sonder, Casemore Kirkby, San Francisco, CA, June-August, 2019.
- Raymond Meeks: Cabbage White Galerie Wouter Van Leeuwen, Amsterdam, Netherlands, November 2016-January 2017.
- Raymond Meeks: In Love with Drama Galerie Wouter Van Leeuwen, Amsterdam, Netherlands, March-April 2015.
- Raymond Meeks: Where Objects Fall Away Galerie Wouter Van Leeuwen, Amsterdam, Netherlands, February-April 2014.

== Awards ==
- 2016: Siskind Fellowship Grant, Aaron Siskind Foundation, New York City. One of six recipients that year.
- 2020: Guggenheim Foundation Fellowship in Photography

== Collections ==
Meeks' work is held in the following permanent collections:

- Bibliothèque nationale de France, Paris
- Light Work, Syracuse, NY
- Museum of Fine Arts, Houston, TX
- National Gallery of Art, Washington, D.C.: 1 print (as of 23 September 2021)
