= Martin Parr =

British documentary photographer (1952–2025)

Martin Parr CBE
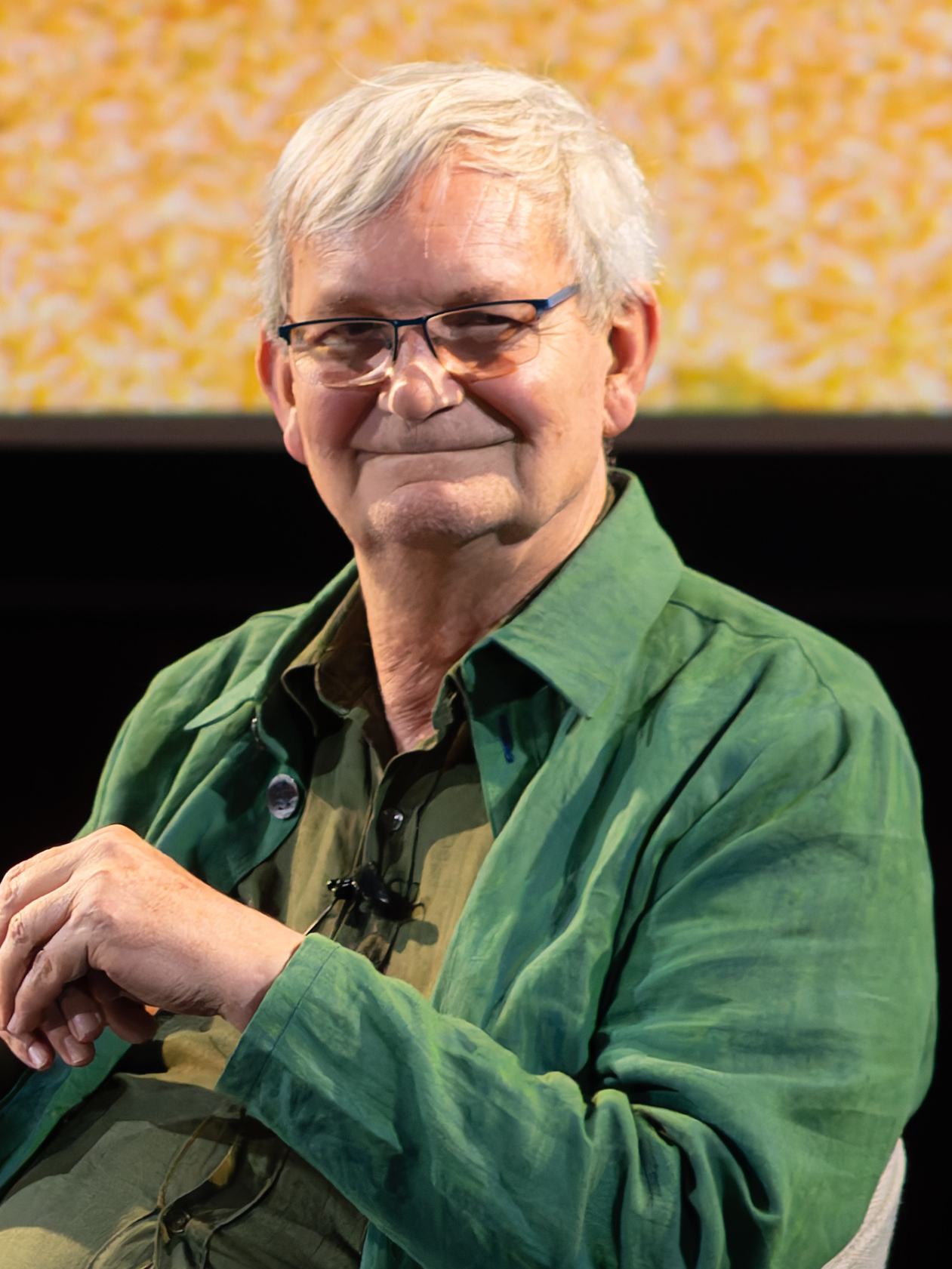
- Parr in 2024
- Born: 23 May 1952; Epsom, Surrey, England
- Died: 6 December 2025 (aged 73); Bristol, England
- Education: Manchester Polytechnic
- Known for: Photography
- Awards: Honorary Fellow of the Royal Photographic Society (HonFRPS) in 2005; Centenary Medal from the Royal Photographic Society in 2008
- Website: martinparr.com

Martin Parr (23 May 1952 – 6 December 2025) was an English documentary photographer and photojournalist. He was known for his photographic projects that take an intimate, satirical and anthropological look at aspects of modern life, in particular documenting the social classes of England, and more broadly the consumerism and wealth of the globalized world.

His major projects were rural communities (1975–1982), The Last Resort (1983–1985), The Cost of Living (1987–1989), Small World (1987–1994) and Common Sense (1995–1999).

Since 1994, Parr had been a member of Magnum Photos. He had around 60 solo photobooks published, and had been featured in around 90 exhibitions worldwide – including the first major retrospective at the Barbican Arts Centre, London, in 2002, which travelled through Europe until 2004 and was accompanied by a monograph by Val Williams. Another major solo exhibition titled ParrWorld was organized by the Haus der Kunst Munich in 2008 and travelled to France and the UK.

Parr sold his vast photobook collection to found the Martin Parr Foundation, which was registered as a charity in 2015. opened premises in his hometown of Bristol in 2017. It houses his personal archive, his collection of British and Irish photography by other photographers, and a gallery.

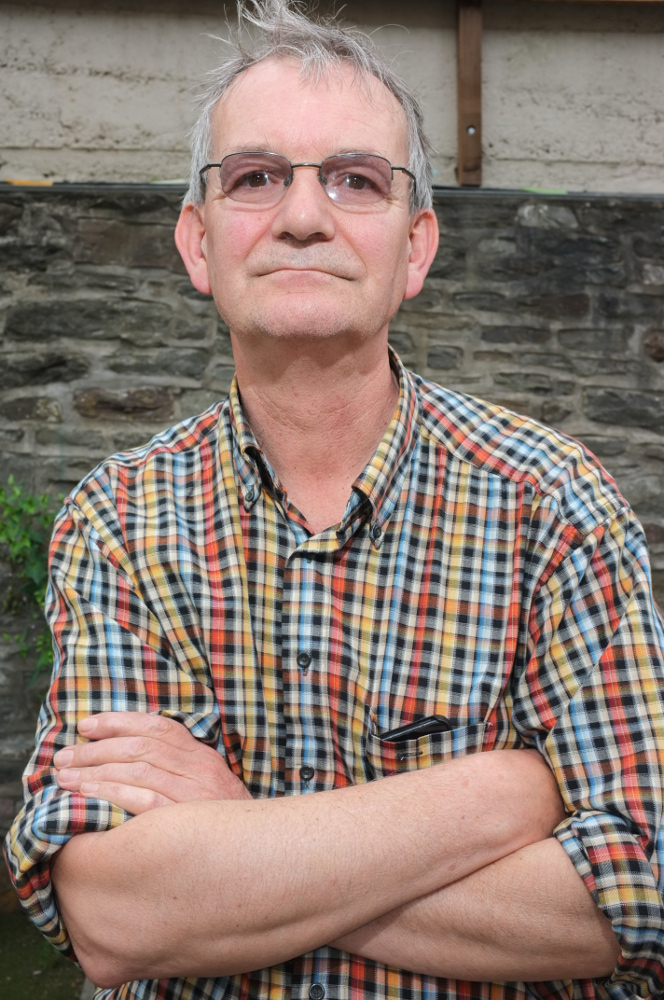
Parr at the Bristol Photobook Festival in 2014

== Photography ==
Parr has said of his photography:

The fundamental thing I'm exploring constantly is the difference between the mythology of the place and the reality of it. ... Remember I make serious photographs disguised as entertainment. That's part of my mantra. I make the pictures acceptable to find the audience but deep down there is actually a lot going on that's not sharply written in your face. If you want to read it you can read it.

Parr's signature aesthetic since the mid-1980s was to employ saturated colour, a result of either the type of film and/or use of fill flash. A ring flash became essential around 1990 for the close-up shots using a macro lens initially for Signs of the Times (1991), and most prominently for Common Sense (1995—1999). About the challenge getting so close to his subjects he wrote, "when I want a photo, I become somewhat fearless and that helps a lot". This allowed him to put his subjects "under the microscope" in their own environment, giving them space to expose their lives and values in ways that often involve inadvertent humour. His technique has been said to leave viewers with ambiguous emotional reactions, unsure whether to laugh or cry.

=== Manchester Polytechnic, 1970–1973 ===
Parr studied photography at Manchester Polytechnic from 1970 to 1973 with contemporaries Daniel Meadows and Brian Griffin. Parr and Meadows collaborated on various projects, including working at Butlin's as roving photographers. They were part of a new wave of documentary photographers, "a loose British grouping, which, though it never gave itself a title have become variously known as 'the Young British Photographers', 'Independent Photographers' and the 'New British Photography'."

=== Rural communities, West Yorkshire, Greater Manchester and Ireland, 1975–1982 ===
In 1975, Parr moved to Hebden Bridge in West Yorkshire where he would complete his first mature work. He was involved with the Albert Street Workshop, a hub for artistic activity which included a darkroom and exhibition space. Parr spent five years photographing rural life in the area, focusing on the Methodist (and some Baptist) non-conformist chapels, a focal point for isolated farming communities that in the early 1970s were closing down. He photographed in black-and-white, for its nostalgic nature and for it being appropriate to his celebratory look at this past activity. Also, photographers at that time were obliged to work in black-and-white to be taken seriously, colour being associated with commercial and snapshot photography. His series The Non-Conformists was widely exhibited at the time and published as a book in 2013. Critic Sean O'Hagan, writing in The Guardian, said "It's easy to forget how quietly observational Parr was as a black-and-white photographer."

In 1980, Parr married Susan Mitchell and, for her work, they moved to the west coast of Ireland.

Parr's first publications, Bad Weather (1981) published in 1982 by Zwemmer with an Arts Council subsidy, Calderdale Photographs (1984) and A Fair Day: Photographs from the West Coast of Ireland (1984), all featured photographs from mostly northern England, and Ireland, in black-and-white. He used a Leica M3 with a 35mm lens; although for Bad Weather he quickly switched to an underwater camera with a flashgun. Parr also photographed a series of pubs in 1982/83, called Yates Wine Lodge.

=== The working class, The Last Resort, 1982–1985 ===
In 1982, Parr and his wife moved to Wallasey, England, and he switched permanently to colour photography, inspired by the work of US colour photographers, mostly Joel Meyerowitz, but also William Eggleston and Stephen Shore, and also the British Peter Fraser and Peter Mitchell. Parr has written that "I had also encountered the post cards of John Hinde when I worked at Butlin's in the early 70s and the bright saturated colour of these had a big impact on me."

During the summers of 1983, 1984 and 1985 he photographed working-class people at the seaside in nearby New Brighton. This work was published in the book The Last Resort: Photographs of New Brighton (1986) and exhibited in Liverpool and London. It was first exhibited at the Serpentine Gallery in London in 1986. For these first colour photographs in 1982 he had bought a Plaubel Makina 67 with a fixed wide-angel lens, a camera, which just recently had entered the British market. Shortly after he began using flashlight (again). He still loved black and white, "but once I moved to colour, I never went back" — except for a few occasions like a trip to India and an invitation to China by its government in 1985, alongside two other photographers, where he took his final photographs in black and white.

Although John Bulmer had pioneered colour documentary photography of Britain, from 1965, In the 2009 reissue of The Last Resort Gerry Badger has emphasised its significance for British photography and Parr's own path: "For both, it represented a seismic change in the basic mode of photographic expression, from monochrome to colour, a fundamental technical change that heralded the development of a new tone in documentary photography." This was underscored by the controversy it inspired, with some critics, upset about the alleged exploitation and exposure of the working class for the photographers' own gain.

Beginning in the early-1980s he also got the chance to exhibit his work outside the UK, and in bigger venues, such as the George Eastman House in Rochester, New York (1985), The Last Resort was presented at the Serpentine Galleries, London (1986), an exhibition at Museum Folkwang in Essen, Germany followed the same year, and also a first appearance at the Festival d'Arles. In Japan he had his first solo show in 1988.

=== The middle class, The Cost of Living (1987–1989) ===
In 1985, Parr completed a commission for the Documentary Photography Archive in Manchester to photograph people at supermarkets in Salford, Retailing in the Borough of Salford, which is now held at the archive.

The young family moved to Bristol in 1987, where they lived until Parr's death in 2025. Parr felt he had to answer the criticism he got for The Last Resort, and wanted to photograph the middle class, which was seldom done before. Although at that time becoming increasingly affluent under Thatcherism, a middle class was largely lacking in Liverpool. During his next major project in 1987 to 1988 Parr photographed middle-class activities such as shopping, dinner parties of the Conservative Party, craft fairs and school open days, predominantly around Bristol and Bath in the southwest of England. It was published as his next book The Cost of Living (1989) and exhibited at the Royal Photographic Society in Bath, and then toured London, Oxford and Paris.

=== Telegraph Magazine and Signs of the Times (1991) ===
For Telegraph Magazine he got a commission to photograph cafés for a summer edition in 1988, and thought of being paid and expenses covered as a "breakthrough" moment. His book One Day Trip (1989) featured photographs taken when he accompanied people on a booze cruise to France, a commission from Mission Photographique Transmanche. The following decade he continued to work for the conservative outlet, "it was by far the most interesting magazine using photography." Even longer a running project was possible, photographing the social life of the small community of Chew Stoke extended over a whole year.

Nicholas Barker, a documentary film director working for the BBC, had seen The Cost of Living, and asked Parr, if he wanted to collaborate on a series on how the British lived, he called Signs of the Times. Parr agreed and took portraits and still lifes of the homes, which were accompanied by a quote from their respective interviews. The photographs were used as inserts in the episodes, and collectively made up a book of the same name, released the following year. Parr appreciated the mixed reactions the series provoked.

=== Mass tourism, Small World (1987–2025) ===
Since 1987 Parr travelled internationally to make his next major series, a critique of mass tourism. (Note: The book Small World is reproduced at the Magnum Photos website.) After some exhibitions earlier the book Small World. Photographs 1987–1994 was published in 1995. Revised editions have been in print since.

He was visiting professor of photography at the University of Art and Design in Helsinki between 1990 and 1992.

=== Global consumerism, Common Sense (1995–1999) ===
Between 1995 and 1999, Parr made the series Common Sense about global consumerism. A first selection was published in January 1997 commissioned by W Magazine in an article titled "Sun Kitsch". Common Sense was finally presented in an exhibition of 350 prints, and a book published in 1999 with 158 images. The exhibition shown in 1999 was staged simultaneously in forty-one venues in seventeen countries, for which it got an entry in the Guinness Book of Records as the largest solo exhibition of an artist ever. The pictures depict the minutiae of consumer culture, and are intended to show the ways in which people entertain themselves. The photographs were taken with a macro lens on 35mm ultra-saturated film for its vivid, heightened colours further enhanced by the employment of a ring flash.

=== Retrospective views since 2000 ===
In 2002, when Parr turned 50, a retrospective perspective set in. In two decades, he published about 20 books. The first comprehensive monograph about him was released in 2002, written by his "longstanding friend and colleague" Val Williams; an updated edition was published in 2014. In 2005 his agency Magnum (with Hachette) published a monograph in the long-running Italian series I Grandi Fotografi, with the images chosen by Parr himself and text by Alessandra Mauro (who edited Tutta Roma the following year). A French edition followed in 2007, and a Parr survey was added to the Phaidon 55 series, for which renowned American photo expert Sandra S. Phillips provided the text.

2007 is also the year in which the first major retrospective exhibition was arranged, but alas in South Korea, at the Seoul Arts Centre. If this wasn't enough, in 2007 Parr's Small World was reissued by his preferred publisher Dewi Lewis in an expanded edition with 30 new images added, and a new text by author Geoff Dyer (in 2018 another revised edition was issued). The Last Resort was re-released two years later, but in its original form with an essay by Gerry Badger, who explores the impact of the book. Earlier work, like The Non-Conformists, on the Nonconformist congregation around Calderdale, originally photographed in 1980, was published for the first time (by Aperture in 2013). Errata Editions dedicate a Book on Books on Bad Weather in 2014, analysed by German curator Thomas Weski. Several other works of the 1970s and '80s was published in small editions by Cafe Royal Books: on Liverpool's Chinatown, 1984 (2015), Yates's (2016), and finally his earliest work created as a student, Prestwich Mental Hospital 1972 (2018).

Parr continued to travel the world, often with commissions to explore towns or regions and occasionally their specific traditions, like Kleingärtner in 2019, a cycle of portraits of organised private gardeners in and around Düsseldorf, coinciding with a retrospective show of his work there. He also took some very lucrative commissions from fashion brands and magazines,^{Refs needed.} and produced a spread for Observer Life on the haute couture ("Models, Make-Up and ₤30,000 Frocks", July 2001). For a short time he collaborated with other photographers (probably also to promote him or her), resulting in books created with Argentine Marcelo Brodsky (2007/8), German Jochen Schmid (2009), and with Rimaldas Viksraitis during his extensive stay in India in 2010.

There are countless interviews with him for newspapers, journals and magazines, while the only extended interview with Parr contained in a book was led by Quentin Bajac, head of photography at the Centre Pompidou, published in 2010 as Parr on Parr, and subsequently edited in French, English, Russian, Spanish and Italian. Wendy Jones interviewed him in 2008 extensively to write his biography (and failed). She returned to him in 2023 and he agreed on her concept, him telling his story through selected photographs; Utterly Lazy and Inattentive was released in 2025, the year of his death.

=== Global Warning (2026) ===
Before he died, Parr had been working on a major retrospective, titled Global Warning, at the Jeu de Paume, Paris, which opened 30 January 2026 and ran through end of May 2026. The exhibition brought together around 180 works spanning five decades of his photographic career, highlighting his critique of contemporary society and human impact on the environment.

== Magnum Photos ==
Parr joined Magnum Photos as an associate member in 1988. The vote on his inclusion as a full member in 1994 was divisive, with Philip Jones Griffiths circulating a plea to other members not to admit him. Parr achieved the necessary two-thirds majority by one vote. Magnum membership helped him work on editorial photography, and on editorial fashion photography for Paul Smith, Louis Vuitton, Galerie du jour Agnès B. and Madame Figaro.

From 2013 to 2017, Parr served as president of Magnum Photos.

== Collecting ==
=== Photobooks ===
Parr was a collector and critic of photobooks. His collaboration with the critic Gerry Badger, The Photobook: A History (in three volumes) covers more than 1,000 examples of photobooks from the 19th century through to the present day. The first two volumes took eight years to complete.

=== Other items ===
Parr also collected postcards, photographs and various other items of vernacular and popular culture such as wallpaper, Saddam Hussein watches and prostitute advertising cards from phoneboxes (items with a photograph on them). Here too, items from his collections have been used as the basis for publications and exhibitions. Since the 1970s, Parr had collected and publicised the garish postcards made between the 1950s and 1970s by John Hinde and his team of photographers.

== Curating ==
Parr was guest artistic director for the 2004 Rencontres d'Arles festival of photography, which critic Sean O'Hagan, writing in The Guardian, described stating: "That year's Arles festival, in its range and ambition, remains the standard by which all subsequent Rencontres have been judged."

He became guest curator of the New Typologies exhibition at the 2008 New York Photo Festival, and of Brighton Photo Biennial in 2010, which he called New Documents.

Parr was artistic director of the newly established Bristol Photo Festival, scheduled to open in 2021. However, in July 2020, he quit, due to his involvement with a 2018 reissue of the photobook London by Gian Butturini, after a campaign by an anthropology student at University College London, who called a pairing of photographs in it racist.

== Film and television ==
Parr was involved in making television, and documentary and other films. Some examples are listed below:

- In 1991, Parr collaborated with Nick Barker, taking photographs to accompany Barker's film Signs of the Times.
- In 2003, Parr was the subject of and appeared extensively in the Imagine BBC One TV series episode "The World According to Parr", directed and produced by Rebecca Frayn, and hosted and executive produced by Alan Yentob.
- He was cameraman on the film It's Nice Up North (2006) with comedian Graham Fellows (as his character John Shuttleworth). The film is a comic documentary filmed over several years in Shetland.
- In 2007, Parr took part in BBC Four's The Genius of Photography, a six-part documentary series written by Gerry Badger, exploring the history of photography.
- In 2008, he was one of three judges on the Channel 4 series Picture This.
- In 2014, Parr created "Turkey and Tinsel", a 60-minute deadpan and often hilarious observational video documentary about faux Christmas in small town England.

== Teaching ==
Parr was visiting professor of photography at the University of Art and Design in Helsinki between 1990 and 1992. He held lectures at West Surrey College of Art & Design (now University for the Creative Arts) in Farnham, Surrey. In 2004, he was appointed professor of photography at the University of Wales, Newport. In 2013, he was appointed professor of photography at Ulster University in Belfast.

== Martin Parr Foundation ==
The Martin Parr Foundation was founded in 2014. It opened premises in Bristol in October 2017. The Foundation houses Parr's own archive, and his collection of prints and book dummies made by other photographers—mainly British and Irish photography, and work by several photographers from abroad who have photographed in the UK. There is a gallery open to the public—its first exhibition was Parr's Black Country Stories—and it is a hub for talks, screenings and events. The Foundation is located in Paintworks in southeast Bristol. Parr was the Foundation's main source of income.

== Reception ==
In the first monograph on Parr in 2002, Val Williams examined the photographer and his work scrupulously closely. The person she describes as a genuine performer, who is impenetrable, and whose interviews are managed and altogether essentially the same, a populist, who stresses his middle-class upbringing, does what everyone does, and enjoys being controversial to complement his understated appearance wearing sheap t-shirts and socks in his signature sandals. His initial work in black-and-white of the 1970s was in hindsight a romantic portrayal of a simpler, communal life, "in houses that were small and unassuming". Whereas in the 80s consumerism took hold of Britain, escalating in the following decade, in the aftermath of 1989 and Glasnost, into corporate culture and globalization (condensed in the cover of Common Sense, "a rusty globe, made into a moneybox"). Parr answered with "more raw, more witty, more nerve-wracking" images. The Cost of Living up to and including Think of England are "just as much a lament for what has disappeared as they are a satire on what took their place." The affluence of products and food, the "surfeit of fat and sugar", have their equivalent in the oversaturated colours of Parr's violent visual glee.

In the 1980s Parr got fierce opponents of his approach to society as a candid colour photographer. In 2000 Colin Jacobson described Parr as a foe:

[...] a gratuitously cruel social critic who has made a large amount of money by sneering at the foibles and pretensions of other people.

On the other hand, German photographic curator Thomas Weski has said:

Martin Parr is a chronicler of our age... Leisure, consumption and communication are the concepts that this British photographer has been researching for several decades now on his worldwide travels... Parr enables us to see things that have seemed familiar to us in a completely new way.

Dan Rule, writing in The Age, has said:

Parr's signature is his ability not only to isolate the most evocative of human details, but to elevate such visual fragments to that of the wider societal signpost or glyph.

The Thames & Hudson Dictionary of Photography writes on Parr:

[...] He refrains from passing summary judgments and seeks to show social ambiguities through a perspective that, even if at times it can be witheringly ironic, is nevertheless imbued with a degree of tenderness.

== Personal life ==
Born in Epsom, Surrey, Parr wanted to become a documentary photographer from the age of 13 or 14. He cited his grandfather, George Parr, an amateur photographer and fellow of the Royal Photographic Society, as an early influence.

Parr struggled academically at school and failed both his History and English A-levels.

Parr met his wife, the writer, researcher and speech therapist, Susie Parr (née Susan Mitchell) at Manchester Polytechnic in the early 1970s. They had one child, Ellen Parr.

Parr was diagnosed with myeloma in May 2021, and died at his home in Bristol on 6 December 2025.

== Honours and awards ==
- 2004: Professor of photography, University of Wales, Newport.
- 2005: Honorary Fellow of the Royal Photographic Society (HonFRPS), Royal Photographic Society, Bath.
- 2006: Honorary master's degree, University for the Creative Arts
- 2006: Dr. Erich Salomon Award, Germany
- 2008: Centenary Medal, Royal Photographic Society, Bath.
- 2008: Doctor of Arts, honorary degree, Manchester Metropolitan University (MMU), in recognition for his ongoing contribution to photography and to the MMU School of Art.
- 2008: Lifetime Achievement Award, PHotoEspaña.
- 2008: International Award from the Photographic Society of Japan.
- 2014: Exceptional Achievement in Photography, Amateur Photographer, London.
- 2014: Lucie Award, Achievement in Documentary Photography, Lucie Foundation.
- 2016: Recognition for Significant Contribution in the Field of Visual Arts, Royal Academy of Arts, London.
- 2017: Outstanding Contribution to Photography prize, World Photography Organisation.

Parr was appointed Commander of the Order of the British Empire (CBE) in the 2021 Birthday Honours for services to photography.

== Publications ==
=== Monographs ===
- Bad Weather. London: Zwemmer, 1982. ISBN 0-302-99996-5. With 54 numbered but uncaptioned black and white plates, and texts by Michael Fish and Peter Turner, and an afterword, "Thoughts on Bad Weather", based on a conversation of Parr with Turner and Heather Forbes.
  - Books on Books 17. New York: Errata Editions, 2014. ISBN 978-1-935004-33-2. Essays by Thomas Weski, "Even the Queen gets wet"; Peter Turner; and Jeffrey Ladd.
- Calderdale Photographs. [Leeds, Yorkshire]: Calderdale Museums Services, 1984. OCLC 441700642. A 12-page catalogue, carrying the explanation "Prepared as a record of Martin Parr's work in the Calder Valley between 1974 and 1980, and to link with the exhibition of his photographs held at Piece Hall Art Gallery, Halifax from 14 January to 19 February 1984."
- A Fair Day: Photographs from the West Coast of Ireland. Wallasey: Promenade, 1984. ISBN 0-907797-10-5. Published to accompany a touring exhibition, text by Fintan O'Toole.
- Prescot: Now and Then. Prescot, Merseyside: Metropolitan Borough of Knowsley Leisure Services Department, 1984. ISBN 0-947739-00-9. Catalogue created by the Prescot Museum.
- The Last Resort: Photographs of New Brighton.
  - Wallasey, Merseyside: Promenade Press, 1986. ISBN 0-9511414-0-6.
  - Stockport, Cheshire: Dewi Lewis, 1998. ISBN 1-899235-16-7.
  - Stockport, Cheshire: Dewi Lewis, 2009. ISBN 1-904587-79-8.
  - The Last Resort. Fotografien von New Brighton. Heidelberg: Kehrer, 2009. ISBN 3-86828-105-3. German-language version.
  - The Last Resort: Photographies de New Brighton. Marseille: Images en Manœuvres, 2009. ISBN 2-84995-154-4. French-language version.
- The Cost of Living. Manchester: Cornerhouse, 1989. ISBN 0-948797-55-X. New York: Aperture, 1991. ISBN 0-89381-439-3. Text by Robert Chesshyre.
- One Day Trip = Voyage d'un jour. Mission photographique transmanche, cahier 5. Paris: Editions de la Différence; Pas-de-Calais: Centre régional de la photographie Nord-Pas-de-Calais, 1989. ISBN 2-904538-19-4. Bilingual (French and English); text by Robert Chesshyre.
- Signs of the Times: A Portrait of the Nation's Tastes. Manchester: Cornerhouse, 1992. ISBN 0-948797-91-6. Text by Nicholas Barker, from a BBC television series.
  - Signes des temps. Paris: Textuel, 2006. ISBN 2-84597-203-2. French-language version.
- L'Ennui à deux = Bored Couples. Paris: Galerie du jour Agnès B., 1993. OCLC 864184535. Catalogue of an exhibition held at Galerie du jour Agnès B.; text in French and English.
- Home and Abroad.
  - Home and Abroad. London: Jonathan Cape, 1993. ISBN 0-224-03132-5. Introduction by Ian McEwan.
  - Doma i v cizině = Home and Abroad. [Prague]: British Council, c.1999. ISBN 80-238-7057-2. OCLC 320072963. Text by Vladimír Birgus.
- From A to B: Tales of Modern Motoring. London: BBC Books, 1994. ISBN 0-563-36984-1.
- Small World.
  - Small World: A global photographic project 1987–1994. Stockport, Cheshire: Dewi Lewis, 1995. ISBN 1-899235-05-1. Introduction by Simon Winchester.
  - Small World: Photographie-Projekt, 1987–1994. Heidelberg: Braus, 1995. ISBN 3-89466-136-4. German-language version. Introduction by Simon Winchester.
  - Quel monde! Paris: Marval, 1995. OCLC 40327904. French-language version. Introduction by Roland Topor.
  - Les Itinéraires culturels. L'Europe en bref. Geneva: Centre européen de la culture; [Arles]: Actes sud, 1997. ISBN 2-7427-1589-4. Extracts from Small World, French text by Michel Thomas-Penette.
  - Small World. Rome: Peliti Associati, 2005. ISBN 88-85121-33-0. Italian-language version.
  - Small World: A global photographic project 1987–1994. Stockport, Cheshire: Dewi Lewis, 2007. Revised edition. ISBN 978-1-904587-40-8. Introduction by Geoff Dyer.
  - Petite planète. Paris: Hoëbeke, 2008. ISBN 2-84230-319-9. French-language version.
  - Small World. Stockport, Cheshire: Dewi Lewis, 2018. ISBN 978-1-911306-35-1. Introduction by Geoff Dyer.
- [Food] / Martin Parr. (Note: Librarians seem to disagree over whether this catalogue even has a title; and if so, what it is.) Catalogue.
  - Paris: Galerie du jour Agnès B., 1995. OCLC 174566690.
  - Paris: Presses artistiques, 1998. OCLC 52999719.
- West Bay. Abingdon, Oxfordshire: Rocket Press, 1997. OCLC 698589004. About West Bay, Dorset, with poems by eight poets, edited by Lottie Hoare. Edition of 250 copies.
- Japonais endormis = Nemuru Nihonjin (眠る日本人). Paris: Galerie du jour Agnès B., 1998. ISBN 2-906496-29-4.
- Common Sense. Stockport, Cheshire: Dewi Lewis, 1999. ISBN 1-899235-07-8. No text.
- Benidorm. Über die Welt. = About the World. Hannover: Sprengel Museum Hannover, 1999. ISBN 3-89169-145-9. Catalogue of an exhibition held at the Sprengel Museum. With text by Gerry Badger and Thomas Weski in German and English.
- Autoportrait. Stockport, Cheshire: Dewi Lewis, 2000. ISBN 1-899235-72-8. A small-format collection of photographs by commercial portrait photographers and others around the world of the unsmiling Parr. Introduction by Marvin Heiferman.
  - Second, augmented edition. Stockport, Cheshire: Dewi Lewis, 2016. ISBN 978-1-907893-80-3.
- Think of England. London: Phaidon.
  - Hardback, 2000. ISBN 0-7148-3991-4.
  - Paperback, 2004. ISBN 0-7148-4454-3.
  - La tendre Albion. 2000. ISBN 0-7148-9121-5. French-language version.
- The Phone Book: 1998–2002. Edition of 2,002 copies. London: Rocket and Essen: Galerie 20.21, 2002. ISBN 0-946676-53-4. ISBN 3-9806647-2-4.
- 7 Communist Still Lifes. One Picture Book 17. Portland, OR: Nazraeli Press, 2003. ISBN 1-59005-051-7. Edition of 500 copies.
- Fashion Magazine. Paris: Magnum Photos, 2005. ISBN 978-2-9524102-0-5. Text in French and English.
- 7 Colonial Still Lifes. One Picture Book 28. Portland, OR: Nazraeli Press, 2005. ISBN 1-59005-133-5. Edition of 500 copies.
- Mexico. With text by Rogelio Villarreal.
  - London: Chris Boot, 2006. ISBN 0-9546894-8-8.
  - New York: Aperture, 2006. ISBN 1-59711-031-0.
- Parrjektif: İstanbulʼda stil peşinde = Parrjective: Style hunting in Istanbul. Istanbul: Mavi Jeans, 2006. ISBN 975-96717-5-1.
- Tutta Roma. Rome: Contrasto, 2006. ISBN 88-6965-016-2. Main text by Ivana della Portella, introduction by Barringer Fifield.
- Parking Spaces. London: Chris Boot, 2007. OCLC 222585004. According to the colophon, "The last parking space photographed by Martin Parr in 41 countries between 2002 and 2007".
- Everybody Dance Now. New York: editions2wice, 2009. ISBN 0-9723886-2-1.
- Playas. London: Chris Boot and Mexico: Editorial RM, 2009.
- Luxury. London: Chris Boot, 2009. ISBN 1-905712-13-8. With an introduction by Paul Smith.
  - Luxury. Madrid: RM, 2009. ISBN 84-92480-63-7. In Spanish.
  - Luxe. Paris: Textuel, 2009. ISBN 2-84597-348-9. In French.
- Martin Parr in India. [New Delhi]: Photoink, 2010. ISBN 81-903911-7-8. "Clubs, hotels & tearooms", "The sea", "Darjeeling", "Indian cakes", "Wedding parties"; text in Hindi, Urdu, and English.
- Japan. Kamakura: Super Labo, 2011. ISBN 4-905052-13-0. Edition of 500 copies.
- 7 Cups of Tea. One Picture Book 74. Portland, OR: Nazraeli Press, 2012. ISBN 978-1-58005-357-0. Edition of 500 copies.
- No Worries. Sydney: T & G, 2012. ISBN 978-0-987079-08-4. Produced for the City of Fremantle Festival of Photography and accompanied an exhibition held at the Western Maritime Museum, Victoria Quay, Fremantle; text by Robert Cook.
- Up and Down Peachtree: Photographs of Atlanta. Rome: Contrasto, 2012. ISBN 88-6965-332-3.
- Souvenir: Martin Parr, fotografia i col·leccionisme. Barcelona: Centre de Cultura Contemporània de Barcelona, 2012. ISBN 84-9803-491-4. Catalogue of an exhibition held at Centre de Cultura Contemporània de Barcelona; text in Catalan, English and Spanish.
- 100 photos de Martin Parr. Pour la liberté de la presse. Paris: Reporters sans frontières, 2012. ISBN 2-36220-010-8.
- Life's a Beach.
  - New York: Aperture, 2012. ISBN 1-59711-224-0. Edition of 1,000 copies.
  - Paris: Xavier Barral, 2012. ISBN 2-36511-027-4. French-language version. Edition of 1,000 copies.
  - Paris: Xavier Barral, 2012. ISBN 2-36511-008-8. French-language version.
  - New York: Aperture, 2013. ISBN 978-1-59711-224-6.
  - Munich: Schirmer/Mosel, 2013. ISBN 3-8296-0638-9. German-language version.
  - Tokyo: Akaaka, 2013. ISBN 4-903545-95-4. Japanese-language version.
- The Non-Conformists. New York: Aperture, 2013. ISBN 1-59711-245-3.
  - Les non-conformistes. Paris: Textuel, 2013. ISBN 2-84597-474-4. French-language version.
  - Los Inconformistas. Madrid: La Fábrica, 2013. ISBN 84-15691-34-3. Spanish-language version.
- Grand Paris. Paris: Xavier Barral, 2014. ISBN 978-2-36511-047-1.
- Voewood Festival. High Kelling, Norfolk: Voewood Publications, 2014. ISBN 978-0-9929472-0-0. Photographs of the Voewood Festival commissioned by Simon Finch. Introduction by DBC Pierre.
- Hong Kong Parr. London: GOST and Hong Kong: Blindspot Gallery, 2014. ISBN 978-1-910401-00-2. Photographs of Hong Kong in 2013 commissioned by Blindspot Gallery, accompanied by an exhibition at the gallery.
- Black Country Stories. Stockport, Cheshire: Dewi Lewis, 2014. ISBN 978-1-907893-63-6. Photographs of the Black Country region of England, commissioned by Multistory, accompanied by an exhibition at The New Art Gallery Walsall and Wolverhampton Art Gallery.
- We Love Britain!. Munich: Schirmer/Mosel, 2014. ISBN 978-3-8296-0687-5. Edited by Inka Schube and with text by Inka Schube in German and English. Photographs of traces of Britishness in and around Hanover, Germany.
- Real Food. London: Phaidon, 2016. With an introductory essay by Fergus Henderson. Photographs of food taken throughout Parr's career.
  - ISBN 978-0-7148-7103-5.
  - ISBN 978-0-7148-7154-7. French-language version.
- The Rhubarb Triangle. Wakefield: The Hepworth Wakefield, 2016. OCLC 985914298. With an essay by Susie Parr. Published to accompany the exhibition The Rhubarb Triangle & Other Stories: Photographs by Martin Parr at The Hepworth Wakefield, Wakefield from a two year commission for the gallery to photograph the Rhubarb Triangle.
- Oxford. Oxford: Oxford University, 2017. ISBN 978-0-19-872441-4.
- Think of Scotland. Bologna: Damiani, 2017. ISBN 978-88-6208-549-6. Published to coincide with the exhibition Think of Scotland at Aberdeen Art Gallery.
- Remote Scottish Postboxes. Bristol: RRB, 2017. ISBN 978-0-9932323-5-0. Edition of 500 copies. With a short text by Susie Parr.
- World (The Price of Love). London: Idea, 2018. Edition of 1000 copies
- Return to Manchester. Manchester: Manchester Art Gallery, 2018. Edited by Natasha Howes. ISBN 978-0-901673-97-8. With a foreword by Alistair Hudson. Published on the occasion of an exhibition at Manchester Art Gallery.
- Match point: Tennis. London: Phaidon, 2021. ISBN 978-1-83866-316-2.
- A Year in the Life of Chew Stoke Village. Photographs by Martin Parr Bristol: RRB PhotoBooks, 2022.
  - Chew Stoke Paris: Maison CF, 2022. ISBN 979-10-96575-27-5. French-language version.
- Animals. Basel: Rookie Books, 2025. ISBN 978-3-9525690-3-0.

=== Retrospectives, private publications, and very limited publications ===
- Boring Photographs. 2000. Photographs of Boring, Oregon. Edition of 12 copies.
- Flowers. Munkedals: Munken & Trebruk, 1999. Paris: Galerie du jour Agnès B., 2001. OCLC 82231759. Edition of 2500.
- Stern Portfolio. Stern Spezial Fotografie 36. Hamburg: Stern, 2004. ISBN 978-3-570194-45-4. Retrospective; texts in German and English.
- Fotografier 1971–2000. Stockholm: Kulturhuset, 2007. OCLC 474779301.
- Martin Parr Retrospective 1971–2000. Seoul Arts Centre, 2007. "This is the catalogue produced for Parr's retrospective show at the Seoul Arts Centre in 2007." (Note: The exhibition was held at the Hangaram Design Museum at Seoul Arts Center. Seo Dong-shin, "Documentary photos create fiction", The Korea Times, undated. Retrieved 13 April 2014.)
- Urban Outfitters. Urban Outfitters, 2011. A "preview catalogue" of photographs taken in Marrakesh for the clothing retailer Urban Outfitters.
- Assorted Cocktail. Luxembourg: Coordination Générale; New York: Magnum Photos, 2006. OCLC 190847363. Exhibition catalogue.
  - [Palma de Mallorca] Ajuntament de Palma; [Alicante] Caja Mediterraneo, [2009]. Catalogue of an exhibition held at Casal Solleric, Palma de Mallorca, Spain, June–September 2009; in Catalan, English, Spanish and French.
  - Prague: DOX, Centre for Contemporary Art, 2011. ISBN 80-87446-06-2. Text by Thomas Weski and Irena Šorfová.
- Only Human: Photographs by Martin Parr. London and New York: Phaidon, 2019. ISBN 978-0-7148-7857-7. Published to coincide with an exhibition.
- Early Works. Bristol: RRB/Martin Parr Foundation, 2019. Edited with Tom Groves and Louis Little.
  - Paris: Maison CF, 2019. ISBN 979-10-96575-38-1. French edition (no text).
- Utterly Lazy and Inattentive. Martin Parr in Words and Pictures. London: Particular Books (Penguin), 2025. ISBN 978-0-241-74082-8 (Hardback and Ebook). Martin Parr and Wendy Jones.

=== Papers and zines ===
- "Partytime". In Basler Magazin. Basel, Switzerland: Basler, 1997. Special edition of Basler Magazin, featuring images by Martin from the Art Basel.
- "On the Ring Road". In The Big Issue 451, 20–26 August 2001. OCLC 500941730. "Martin Parr explores the strange rituals of suburban Britain".
- A8 Glasgow. London: John McAslan + Partners, 2005.OCLC 75968602. Special issue of JMP Journal. Parr invited by architect John McAslan to photograph the surroundings of his childhood haunts between Dunoon and Port Glasgow. [...] 28 colour photographs."
- Rebirth. Stiletto, 2007. "A Stiletto fashion supplement."
- Luxembourg. Luxembourg et Grande Region, 2007. 32-page newspaper with 36 photographs published in the citie's year as the European Capital of Culture 2007."
- Fashion Newspaper. London: Magnum Photos, 2007. OCLC 778631195 (in English and Japanese). Accompanying a 2007 exhibition at the Tokyo Metropolitan Museum of Photography. "In 2007 Parr's fashion exhibition, initiated by Bon Marche in Paris, went to Tokyo. This special newspaper was published to accompany the show. It features the Paul Smith's winter 2007 collection as well as a folio of images taken in the UK. [...] 57 colour photographs."
- Dubai. Dubai: The Third Line Gallery, 2008. Horse races and polo in Dubai.
- Guardian Cities Project. London: The Guardian, 2008. OCLC 778916872. A box set of newspaper supplements on Manchester, Brighton, Liverpool, Bristol, Cardiff, Edinburgh, Belfast, Newcastle, Cambridge and Leeds.
- The Art Newspaper, 16 October 2008. London: Umberto Allemandi, 2008. "A special edition of The Art Newspaper published and given out during Frieze Art Fair in London. Includes exclusive photographs shot by Martin at the event."
- The Art Newspaper, 18–19 October 2008. London: Umberto Allemandi, 2008. "A special edition of The Art Newspaper published and given out during Frieze Art Fair in London. Includes exclusive photographs shot by Martin at the event."
- St Mary Redcliffe & Temple School. Bristol City Council, 2011. Artist in residence at St Mary Redcliffe and Temple School in Bristol for the 2010/2011 academic year. Installation at the school and a newspaper for every pupil."
- The Goutte d'Or. Paris: L'Institut des Cultures d'Islam, 2011. Newspaper accompanying an exhibition at the Islam Cultural Centre in this Paris suburb."
- Bristol and West. Bristol: M Shed, 2011. "Published to accompany Parr's show at the newly opened M Shed in Bristol. Parr showed the many images taken in his long career in the West of England."
- Think of Switzerland. Zurich: Du, 2013. Edition with old and new photographs of Switzerland.
- Black Country Women. West Bromwich: Multistory, 2013. ISBN 978-0-956345-77-6. A magazine made for and about Black Country women, text by Margaret Drabble.
- The Rhubarb Triangle. Wakefield: The Hepworth Wakefield, 2016. 24-page exhibition gazette with an essay by Susie Parr.
- Chinatown 1984. Southport: Café Royal, 2015. Edition of 250 copies.
- Yates's. Southport: Café Royal, 2016. Edition of 500 copies.
- Abandoned Morris Minors of the West of Ireland. Southport: Café Royal, 2017. Edition of 500 copies.
- Prestwich Mental Hospital 1972. Southport: Café Royal, 2018. Edition of 500 copies.
- The British Seaside. Southport: Café Royal, 2020. Edition of 500 copies.

=== Postcards of photographs by Parr ===
- Home and Abroad. London: British Council, 1994. OCLC 51048056. A set of postcards, as the catalogue of a travelling exhibition. Text by Brett Rogers. Not to be confused with the book of the same title.
- Love Cube. [Stockholm]: Gun Gallery, 2007. ISBN 91-974925-0-7. Twenty-seven cards in a box, booklet with text by Johan Croneman.
- Royal Wedding. Paris: Verlhac, 2011. ISBN 2-916954-79-1 (in French). Set of 10 postcards inside small album. Text by Stéphane Bern.
- Royal Jubilee. Set of 10 postcards inside small album. Text by Stéphane Bern.
  - London: Pavilion, 2012. ISBN 978-1-86205-977-1.
  - Paris: Verlhac, 2012. ISBN 978-2-916954-94-3 (French-language version).

=== Books with others ===
- Sobre Santiago: tres de Magnum. Exhibition catalogue. Santiago de Compostela: Universidade de Santiago de Compostela, Servicio de Publicacións e Intercambio Científico, 1993. ISBN 84-8121-059-5 (in Galician and English). Photographs by Parr, Carl De Keyzer and Miguel Rio Branco.
- Sguardi gardesani. Exhibition catalogue, Museo Civico, Riva del Garda. Milan: Charta, 1999. ISBN 88-8158-223-6 (in Italian and English). Photographs by Parr and John Davies, text by Franco Rella.
- CPictures. Rome: Contrasto Due, 2003. ISBN 978-88-86982-78-8 (in Italian and English). Photographs by Parr, Gianni Berengo Gardin, Gueorgui Pinkhassov and Sandro Sodano; text by Renata Molho and Denis Curti.
- Venedig. Edited by Nikolaus Gelpke. Frankfurt am Main: Büchergilde Gutenberg, 2005. ISBN 3-7632-5656-3. Photographs by Parr, Zora Del Buono, Paolo Pellegrin, Gueorgui Pinkhassov, Mark Power and Robert Voit.
- Road Trip, Martin Parr and Friends. Sony Ericsson, 2005. OCLC 693324651. A promotional compilation for the Sony Ericsson K750 camera phone.
- America 2006. London: Stephen Daiter Gallery/Schaden.com/Rocket Gallery, 2007. OCLC 778868246. By Parr and John Gossage, "as the artists' choice of aliases, Obvious or Ordinary".
- Witness Number Three. New York: Joy of Giving Something, 2007. ISBN 1-59005-214-5. Photographs by Parr ("Art World"), and by Keizō Kitajima, Kohei Yoshiyuki and Osamu Kanemura ("The lost generation"), and texts by Parr ("Three ways to make a book"), Susie Parr ("Little England"), and a transcript of Parr in conversation with Gerry Badger.
- How We Are: Photographing Britain, from the 1840s to the Present. Exhibition catalogue, edited by Val Williams and Susan Bright. London: Tate, 2007. ISBN 1-85437-714-0. Parr and Gerry Badger contribute the chapter "We are all photographers now".
- Correspondencia: Marcelo Brodsky + Martin Parr. Exhibition catalogue. AFA nécessaire. [Santiago, Chile]: Galería AFA, 2008. ISBN 956-8627-02-2 (in Spanish and English).
- Joachim Schmid Is Martin Parr · Martin Parr Is Joachim Schmid. Self-published, Joachim Schmid / Blurb, 2009.
- Parr by Parr – Quentin Bajac Meets Martin Parr – Discussions with a Promiscuous Photographer. Amsterdam: Schilt, 2010. ISBN 978-9-053307-37-3. With Quentin Bajac.
  - Le Mélange des genres. Paris: Textuel, 2010. ISBN 2-84597-391-8 (French-language version).
  - Martin Parr por Martin Parr: Un diálogo con Quentin Bajac: discusiones con un fotográfo promiscuo. BlowUp. Libros únicos. Madrid: La Fábrica D.L., 2010. ISBN 84-92841-70-2 (Spanish-language version).
  - Intervista a un fotografo promiscuo. Lezioni di fotografia. Rome: Contrasto, 2012. ISBN 88-6965-392-7 (Italian-language version).
  - Мартин Парр: В своем жанре. Интервью с Квентинм Бажаком. Treemedia, 2012. ISBN 978-5-903788-17-0 (Russian-language version).
- A Book of King's: Views of a Cambridge College. Edited by Karl Sabbagh. Third Millennium Information, 2010. ISBN 1-906507-36-8. About King's College, Cambridge.
- Machu Picchu (Nazraeli Press Six by Six, set 1 of 4). Portland, OR: Nazraeli, 2010. ISBN 1-59005-297-8. Edition of 100 copies. The other volumes are by Anthony Hernandez, Todd Hido, Raymond Meeks, Toshio Shibata and Mark Steinmetz.
- The Real World = Tikras Pasaulis. Kaunas: Kaunas Photography Gallery, [2010]. ISBN 978-609-95146-1-1. A two-volume set: one volume by Parr and the other by Rimaldas Vikšraitis.
- One Day: 10 Photographers. Edited by Harvey Benge. Heidelberg: Kehrer Verlag, 2011. ISBN 978-3-86828-173-6. A boxed set of ten slim books of photographs taken on 21 June 2010, each book by one of Parr, Jessica Backhaus, Gerry Badger, Benge, John Gossage, Todd Hido, Rob Hornstra, Rinko Kawauchi, Eva Maria Ocherbauer and Alec Soth. On this day Parr was at home in Bristol, and (according to the preface) "I decided to photograph the small rituals of my daily life".
- Made in Italy. Rimini: Pazzini Editore, 2012. Booklet. "A commission for the Savignano Immagini Photo Festival in Italy resulted in this work exploring the Italian fashion industry in the area. Parr's images make up one of eight booklets by different photographers [...] collectively called Sin_Tesis . Terrority | Now."

=== Books edited or with contributions by Parr ===
- The Actual Boot: The photographic post card boom, 1900–1920. Bradford: National Museum of Photography, Film, and Television, 1986. ISBN 0-948308-03-6. With Jack Stasiak. Catalogue of an exhibition that opened at the National Museum of Photography, Film, and Television and then toured.
- smart. Reduce to the Max. Biel, Switzerland: Micro Compact Car AG, 1997. OCLC 175165701. About the Smart car. Concept by Reinhold Weber, Parr is the primary photographer.
- Boring Postcards. London: Phaidon, 1999. Hardback ISBN 0-7148-3895-0. Paperback ISBN 0-7148-4390-3. Reproductions of boring postcards of Britain.
- London 1958–59. Stockport: Dewi Lewis, 1998. ISBN 1-899235-71-X. Photographs by Sergio Larrain, introduction by Mike Seaborne.
- Boring Postcards USA. London: Phaidon, 2000. Hardback ISBN 0-7148-4000-9. Paperback ISBN 0-7148-4391-1. Reproductions of boring postcards of the US.
- Langweilige Postkarten. London: Phaidon, 2001. ISBN 0-7148-4062-9. Reproductions of boring postcards of Germany.
- From Our House to Your House: Celebrating the American Christmas. Stockport, Cheshire: Dewi Lewis, 2002. ISBN 1-899235-34-5
- Our True Intent Is All for Your Delight: The John Hinde Butlin's Photographs. London: Chris Boot, 2002. ISBN 0-9542813-0-6. London: Chris Boot, 2011. ISBN 1-905712-20-0.
  - Notre sincère désir est votre plaisir. Paris: Textuel, 2002. ISBN 2-84597-064-1. French-language version.
- Bliss: Postcards of Couples and Families. London: Chris Boot, 2003. ISBN 0-9542813-3-0. Reproductions of postcards.
  - Bonheur! garanti pour le couple, idéal pour la famille. Textuel, 2003. ISBN 978-2-84597-097-7. French-language version.
- Saddam Hussein Watches. [London: Chris Boot], 2004. OCLC 58732043.
- Lodz Ghetto Album. London: Chris Boot, 2004. ISBN 0-9542813-7-3. Photographs by Henryk Ross of the Łódź Ghetto under the Nazis; selected by Parr and Timothy Prus.
  - Łódź Getto. Łódź: Fundacja Edukacji Wizualnej, 2005. OCLC 751110164.
- Arles, rencontres de la photographie: 2004. Arles: Actes Sud, 2004. ISBN 2-7427-5221-8. Parr was curator.
- The Photobook: A History. London: Phaidon. With Gerry Badger.
  - Vol. I. 2004. ISBN 0-7148-4285-0.
  - Vol. II. 2006. ISBN 0-7148-4433-0.
  - Vol. III. 2014. ISBN 978-0-7148-6677-2.
- Le livre de photographies: une histoire. Paris: Phaidon.
  - Tome 1. 2005. ISBN 0-7148-9483-4.
  - Tome 2. 2007. ISBN 0-7148-9706-X.
- My Amsterdam. Amsterdam: De Verbeelding, 2005. ISBN 90-74159-78-8. Photographs by Ed van der Elsken. Accompanying an exhibition at Amsterdam Fotomuseum/FOAM; edited and introduced by Parr.
- Photographs. Rome: Contrasto, 2006. ISBN 88-6965-015-4. Photographs by David Goldblatt. Parr contributes a short introduction to this book, published to accompany an exhibition described as curated by Parr.
  - David Goldblatt. Südafrikanische Fotografien 1952–2006. Winterthur: Fotomuseum, 2007. ISBN 3-85616-294-1.
- Darkroom. Portland, OR: Nazraeli, 2007. ISBN 978-1-59005-192-4. Photographs by Michel Campeau. First book in the "Parr/Nazraeli Edition of Ten".
- Half Awake and Half Asleep in the Water. Portland, OR: 2007. ISBN 978-1-59005-215-0. Photographs by Asako Narahashi. Second book in the "Parr/Nazraeli Edition of Ten".
- Parr World. Postcards. London: Chris Boot, 2008. ISBN 978-1-905712-10-6. Reproductions of postcards.
  - Cartes postales. Monde de Martin Parr. Paris: Textuel, 2008. ISBN 2-84597-287-3.
- Parr World. Objects. London: Chris Boot, 2008. ISBN 978-1-905712-08-3.
  - Objets. Monde de Martin Parr. Paris: Textuel, 2008. ISBN 2-84597-287-3.
- NYPH 08: New York Photo Festival 14–18 May: The Future of Contemporary Photography: DUMBO, Brooklyn. New York: Powerhouse, 2008. ISBN 1-57687-479-6. Book of an exhibition curated by Parr.
- Bureaucratics. Portland, OR: Nazraeli, 2008. ISBN 978-1-59005-232-7. Photographs by Jan Banning. Third book in the "Parr/Nazraeli Edition of Ten".
- Portfolio: Click to Add Subtitle. Blurb, 2009. OCLC 680083358. About the Photography. Book. Now 2010 competition; with text by Parr, WassinkLundgren (Thijs groot Wassink and Ruben Lundgren), Blurb, Hewlett-Packard.
- School. Portland, OR: Nazraeli, 2009. ISBN 1-59005-241-2. Photographs by Raimond Wouda. Fourth book in the "Parr/Nazraeli Edition of Ten".
- Visual correspondences = Correspondencias visuales. Buenos Aires: La Marca Editora, 2009. OCLC 429143026. Artwork by Parr, Marcelo Brodsky, Manuel Esclusa, Cassio Vasconcellos, Pablo Ortiz Monasterio and Horst Hoheisel; texts by Valeria González, Eduardo Cadava and Paola Cortes-Rocca. In Spanish and English.
- Archivo. Amsterdam, 2009. ISBN 90-72532-04-X. Work by Parr, Harold Strak, Eva-Fiore Kovakovsky, Johannes Schwartz, Daya Cahen, Paul Kooiker, Qiu Yang, Kyungwoo Chun, Lee To Sang, Erik van der Weijde, Sara Blokland, Willem van Zoetendaal, Anuschka Blommers & Niels Schumm, and Miroslav Tichý. Catalogue of an exhibition curated by Paul Kooiker and Willem van Zoetendaal.
- Retratos Pintados. Portland, OR: Nazraeli Press 2010. Painted photographs collected by Titus Riedl. Fifth book in the "Parr/Nazraeli Edition of Ten".
- Grimaces of the Weary Village by Rimaldas Vikšraitis. London: White Space Gallery, 2010. ISBN 0-9557394-6-2.
- Brighton Photo Biennial 2010: New Documents. Brighton: Brighton Photo Biennial, 2010. ISBN 1-903796-44-X. Catalogue of an exhibition curated by Parr, edited by Parr and Helen Cadwallader.
- Geografía postal: Las postales de las familias García Lorca y De los Ríos. Madrid: This Side Up; Fundación Federico García Lorca; Obra Social Caja Madrid, 2010. ISBN 84-934916-2-4. Selected by Parr, text by Enrique Vila-Matas. In Spanish.
  - Postal Geography: Postcards of the García Lorca and De los Ríos Families. Madrid: Instituto Cervantes, Fundación Federico García Lorca, Obra Social Caja Madrid, 2012. OCLC 847873266. English-language version, to accompany an exhibition held at Instituto Cervantes, Dublin.
- Magnum Contact Sheets. Edited by Kristen Lubben.
  - Magnum Contact Sheets. London: Thames & Hudson, 2011. ISBN 978-0-500-54412-9.
    - Magnum Contact Sheets: The Collector's Edition: Martin Parr, Last Resort, 1985. London: Thames & Hudson, 2011. ISBN 978-0-500-54412-9. Includes a print of a contact sheet. Edition of 50 copies.
  - Magnum Contact Sheets. London: Thames & Hudson, 2014. ISBN 978-0-500-54431-0. Compact edition.
- Martin Parr's Best Books of the Decade. PhotoIreland, 2011. OCLC 756036166. Edited by Moritz Neumüller and Ángel Luis González. With texts by Parr and 30 photographers.
- La Creciente. Portland, OR: Nazraeli, 2011. ISBN 978-1-59005-321-8. Photographs by Alejandro Chaskielberg. Sixth book in the "Parr/Nazraeli Edition of Ten".
- The Protest Box. Göttingen: Steidl, 2011. ISBN 978-3-86930-124-2. Contains Protest on Paper (ISBN 3-86930-142-2); Enrique Bostelmann, América: un Viaje a traves de la injustica (1970); Paolo Gasparini, Para verte major, América Latina (1972); Dirk Alvermann, Algeria (1961); Kazuo Kitai, Sanrizuka (1971); Paolo Mattioli and Anna Candiani, Immagini del No (1974). Co-edited with Gerry Badger.
- El fotolibro latinoamericano. Mexico City: Fundación Televisa, 2011. OCLC 777865333. Co-edited with Horacio Fernández, Marcelo Brodsky, Iatã Cannabrava, Pablo Ortiz Monasterio, and others. English-language version.
  - The Latin American Photobook. Aperture Foundation and Fundación Televisa, 2011. ISBN 978-1-59711-189-8. English-language version.
  - Les Livres de photographie d'Amérique latine. Marseille: Images en manoeuvres, 2011. ISBN 2-84995-216-8. French-language version.
- From Here On. Arles: Les Rencontres d'Arles-photographie, 2011. ISBN 2-9539168-1-4. Catalogue of an exhibition curated by Parr, Clément Chéreux, Joan Fontcuberta, Erik Kessels and Joachim Schmid; text in French and English.
  - From here on: D'ara endavant: La postfotografia en l'era d'internet I la telefonia mòbil = From here on: a partir de ahora: la postfotografía en la era de internet y la telefonía móvil = From here on: Postphotography in the age of the Internet and the mobile phone. Mexico City: Editorial RM; Barcelona: Arts Santa Monica: Generalitat de Catalunya, Department de Cultura, 2013. ISBN 84-393-8994-9; ISBN 84-15118-45-7.
- New Latin Look = Nueva mirada latina. Madrid: Ivorypress, 2012. ISBN 84-939498-4-1. Edited by Parr and Elena Ochoa Foster. In Spanish and English.
- Strangely Familiar. Portland, OR: Nazraeli, 2013. ISBN 1-59005-353-2. Photographs by Peter Mitchell. Seventh book in the "Parr/Nazraeli Edition of Ten".
- Watford Gap: The First Motorway Service Station. Ipswich: Diesel Books, 2013. ISBN 978-0-9566928-2-5. Photographs by Sam Mellish, introduction by David Harsent, and "archival imagery" by Parr.
- Only in England: Photographs by Tony Ray-Jones. Bradford: National Media Museum, 2013. ISBN 978-1-900747-67-7. OCLC 870756771. Published to accompany an exhibition described as having a portion of its images selected from the Ray-Jones archive by Parr and Greg Hobson. Parr contributes an essay. Introductions by Hannah Redler and Greg Hobson, and essays also by David Alan Mellor and Ian Walker.
- The Waiting Game. Mexico City, Mexico: Editorial RM, 2014. ISBN 978-84-15118-57-2. Photographs by Txema Salvans. Parr and John Carlin each contribute a short introduction.
- Hidden Islam. Bolzano/Bozen, Italy: Rorhof, 2014. ISBN 978-88-909817-0-8. Photographs by Nicolò Degiorgis. Edited and introduced by Parr.
- The Chinese Photobook. With WassinkLundgren. New York: Aperture, 2015. ISBN 978-1-59711-228-4; Mid-Sized Edition, 2016, ISBN 978-1-59711-375-5. With texts by Gu Zheng, Raymond Lum, Ruben Lundgren, Stephanie H. Tung, and Gerry Badger.
- ABC Photography. Berlin: Tarzipan, 2017. Photographs by Parr, Nan Goldin, Sarah Illenberger, Peter Lindbergh, Christoph Niemann, Bene Ochs, Sebastião Salgado, Alec Soth, Wolfgang Tillmans, and others. Text by Monte Packham.
- Photobook Phenomenon. Munich: Prestel; CCCB/RM/Fundació Foto Colectania, 2017. A box set of eight booklets of writing, one each by Moritz Neumüller and Lesley Martin, Markus Schaden and Frederic Lezmi, Parr ("The Collector's Vision"), Horacio Fernández, Ryuichi Kaneko, Gerry Badger, Erik Kessels, and Irene de Mendoza and Neumüller. ISBN 978-84-17047-05-4.
- Tony Ray-Jones. Paris: Maison CF, 2019. ISBN 979-10-96575-11-4. Photographs by Tony Ray-Jones. Edited and introduced by Martin Parr.

=== Monographs on Parr ===
These also include photographs by Parr.

- Martin Parr by Val Williams. Accompanied the retrospective show at the Barbican Arts Centre, London in 2002.
  - London: Phaidon, 2002. ISBN 0-7148-3990-6. Hardback.
    - London: Phaidon, 2004. ISBN 0-7148-4389-X. Paperback.
    - 2nd ed. London: Phaidon, 2014. ISBN 0-7148-6566-4.
  - Martin Parr. Rome: Contrasto, 2002. ISBN 88-86982-47-X. Italian-language version.
  - Berlin: Phaidon, 2008. ISBN 0-7148-9391-9. German-language version.
- Martin Parr vu par... Bonsecours, France: Édition Point de vues, 2005. By children; in French.
- Martin Parr by Sandra S. Phillips.
  - Phaidon 55. London: Phaidon, 2007. ISBN 978-0-7148-4528-9.
    - London: Phaidon, 2013.
  - Paris: Phaidon, 2007. ISBN 0-7148-9992-5. French-language edition.
- Martin Parr, text by Alessandra Mauro.
  - I Grandi Fotografi: Magnum Photos. Testimonianze e visioni del nostro tempo. Milan: Hachette Fascicoli, 2005. OCLC 799576457. In Italian.
  - Grandes fotográfos Magnum Photos 20. [Barcelona]: Salvat [2007]. ISBN 84-471-0558-X. In Spanish.

== Exhibitions ==
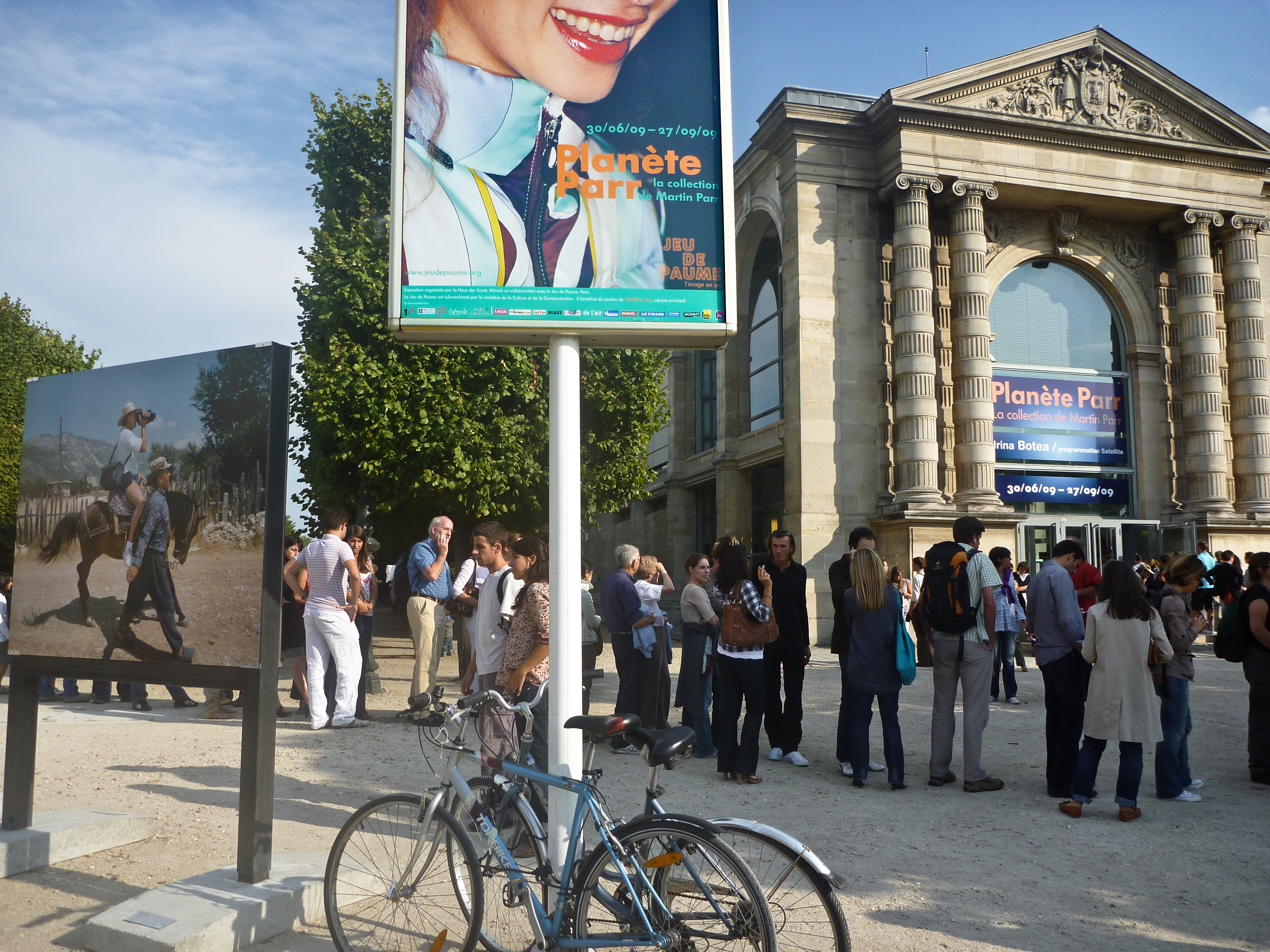
Queue for the exhibition ParrWorld at Galerie nationale du Jeu de Paume, Paris, 2009.

- 1972: Butlins by the Sea (with Daniel Meadows), Impressions Gallery, York, UK.
- 1974: Home Sweet Home, Impressions Gallery, York, UK.
- 1977: Hebden Bridge and Beauty Spots, The Photographers' Gallery, London.
- 1989–1991: The Cost of Living, Royal Photographic Society, Bath, 1989/1990; The Photographers' Gallery, London, 1990; Museum of Modern Art, Oxford, 1990; Gallery Jacques Gordat, Paris, 1991.
- 2002–2005: Retrospective, Martin Parr Photoworks 1971–2000, Barbican Arts Centre, London, 2002; National Museum of Photography, Film, and Television, Bradford, 2002; Kunsthal, Rotterdam, The Netherlands, 2003; Museo Nacional Centro de Arte Reina Sofía, Madrid, 2003; National Museum of Photography, Copenhagen, 2003; Deichtorhallen, Hamburg, 2004. Works 1971–2001, Maison européenne de la photographie, Paris, 2005. Curated by Val Williams and organised by Brigitte Lardinois. Photographs from the 1970s–2001, from the series Butlins by the Sea, June Street, Home Sweet Home, The Last Resort, The Cost of Living, Small World and Autoportraits.

Selection of Common Sense and Assorted Cocktail in 2011 at the DOX Centre for Contemporary Art, Prague

- 2007: Retrospective, Month of Photography Asia, Singapore. Parr's exhibition was the main show.
- 2008: Assorted Cocktail, Santralİstanbul, Istanbul.
- 2008/2009: ParrWorld, touring exhibition, Haus der Kunst, Munich, 2008; Galerie nationale du Jeu de Paume, Paris, 2009; Baltic Centre for Contemporary Art, Gateshead, UK, 2009.
- 2013/2014: Only in England: Photographs by Tony Ray-Jones and Martin Parr, Media Space, Science Museum, London, September 2013 – March 2014; National Media Museum, Bradford, March–June 2014; Walker Art Gallery, Liverpool, February–June 2015. With Parr's The Non-Conformists and material from the National Media Museum's Tony Ray-Jones archive, curated by Parr and Greg Hobson.
- 2014: Black Country Stories, New Art Gallery, Walsall and Wolverhampton Art Gallery. Commissioned by Multistory, Parr photographed the four boroughs of the Black Country, documenting the traditions and communities that live there. This work produced the photobook, Martin Parr: Black Country Stories (2014), along with four films, including Teddy Gray's Sweet Factory (2011).
- 2014: Paris, Maison Européenne de la Photographie, Paris
- 2015: Souvenir, Fotografiska Stockholm.
- 2017: Sony World Photography Awards & Martin Parr – 2017 Exhibition, Somerset House, London. Three rooms dedicated to Parr, with "black and white images from his early career, alongside some of the artist's most talked about work, books and films and original exhibition posters." Also shown were a "selection of the winning, shortlisted and commended work from the World Photography Organisation's annual photography competi[ti]on."
- 2018: Only Human: Photographs by Martin Parr. National Portrait Gallery, London.
- 2019: In Black & White: Martin Parr & Tony Ray-Jones. Galerie Clémentine de la Féronnière, Paris.
- 2022-2023: Henri Cartier-Bresson with Martin Parr - Reconciliation, Fondation Henri Cartier-Bresson, Paris.
- 2024: Martin Parr. Early Works, Fotografie Forum Frankfurt, Frankfurt am Main.
- 2025: Martin Parr: Short & Sweet, Fotografiska Shanghai, China, Shanghai China.
- 2025: Martin Parr X Bristol Pride. Bristol Museum and Art Gallery, Bristol, UK.
- 2026: Photography in Power (group exhibition), Fotografiska Tallinn, Estonia.

Martin Parr

== Films ==
=== Films with contributions by Parr ===
- It's Nice Up North (2006) – cameraman

=== Films about Parr ===
- I Am Martin Parr (2024) – documentary film directed by Lee Shulman

== Collections ==
Parr's work is held in the following permanent collections:

- Art Institute of Chicago, Chicago, Illinois
- Victoria and Albert Museum, London
- Tate, London

== See also ==
- Richard Billingham
- Anna Fox
- Paul Graham
- Chris Killip
- Tony Ray-Jones
- Paul Reas
- Nick Waplington
- Tom Wood
