= Mark Steinmetz =

American photographer

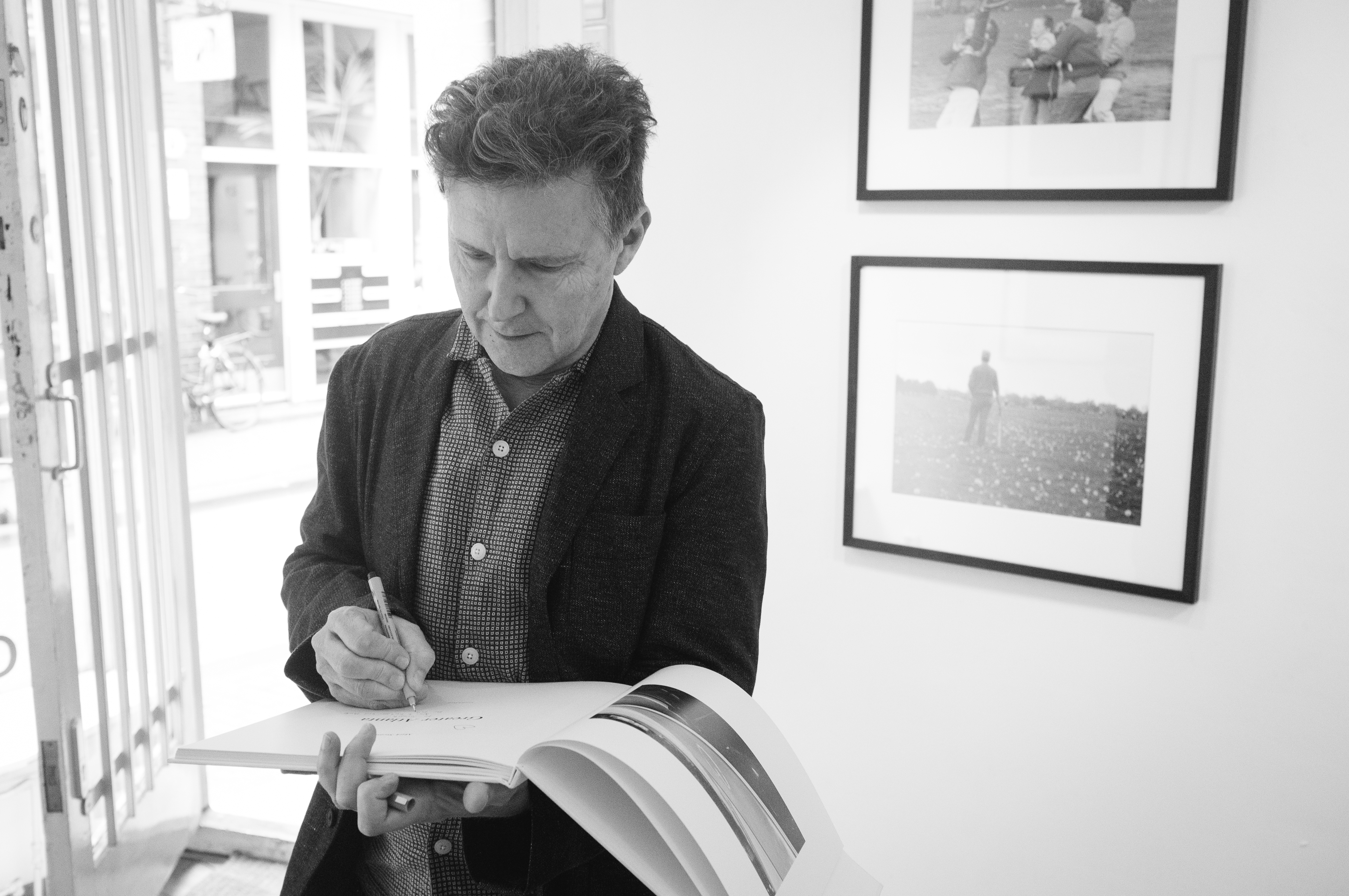
- Steinmetz at Galerie Wouter van Leeuwen in Amsterdam, 2016
- Born: Mark Christopher Steinmetz; March 31, 1961 (age 65); Manhattan, New York City
- Occupation: Photographer
- Website: www.marksteinmetz.net

Mark Christopher Steinmetz (born March 31,1961) is an American photographer. He makes black and white photographs "of ordinary people in the ordinary landscapes they inhabit".

Steinmetz's work was shown in a group exhibition at the Museum of Modern Art, New York in 1993/1994 and in solo exhibitions at the Ogden Museum of Southern Art in 2015, the High Museum of Art in 2018 and at Fotohof in Salzburg, Austria in 2019. He is the recipient of a Guggenheim Fellowship.

His work is held in the collections of the Art Institute of Chicago, Hunter Museum of American Art, Museum of Contemporary Photography, Chicago, Metropolitan Museum of Art, Whitney Museum of American Art and Museum of Modern Art, New York, and Nelson-Atkins Museum of Art.

== Life and work ==
Steinmetz was born in New York City and raised in the Boston suburbs of Cambridge and Newton until he was 12. He then moved to the midwest before, aged 21, he went to study photography at the Yale School of Art in New Haven, Connecticut. He left that MFA program after one semester and in mid 1983, aged 22, moved to Los Angeles in search of the photographer Garry Winogrand, whom he befriended. He moved to Athens, Georgia in 1999 and was still living and working there as of 2017.

Steinmetz makes photographs "of ordinary people in the ordinary landscapes they inhabit", and "in the midst of activity". Most of his work has been made in the USA but also in Berlin, Paris, and Italy. His books combine portraits (portrait-like but spontaneous) and candid photos of people, and also include animals and still life photos. He finds many of his subjects whilst walking around but he has also spent time at Little League Baseball and summer camps.

Steinmetz predominantly works with black and white film, usually medium format, developed and printed in his own darkroom. He has mostly worked the same way with the same film, chemicals, and cameras since beginning in the mid 1980s.

== Publications ==
=== Books of work by Steinmetz ===
- Tuscan Trees. The Jargon Society, 2002. With text by Janet Lembke. ISBN 978-0912330839.
- South Central. Portland, OR: Nazraeli, 2007. ISBN 1590051718.
  - Second edition. Paso Robles, CA: Nazraeli, 2020. ISBN 978-1-59005-532-8.
- South East. Portland, OR: Nazraeli, 2008. ISBN 978-1-59005-533-5.
  - Second edition. Paso Robles, CA: Nazraeli, 2020. ISBN 978-1-59005-534-2.
- Greater Atlanta. Portland, OR: Nazraeli, 2009. ISBN 978-1590052594.
  - Second edition. Paso Robles, CA: Nazraeli, 2020. ISBN 978-1-59005-534-2.
- Philip and Micheline. TBW, 2010. Subscription Series #3, Book #1. ISBN 978-1-942953-07-4. Elaine Stocki, Dru Donovan, and Katy Grannan each had one book in a set of four.
- The Ancient Tigers of My Neighborhood. Six by Six, Set 1. Portland, OR: Nazraeli, 2010. Anthony Hernandez, Todd Hido, Raymond Meeks, Martin Parr, and Toshio Shibata each had one book in a set of sex. Edition of 100 copies.
- Italia: Cronaca di un Amore. One Picture Book 64. Portland, OR: Nazraeli, 2010. ISBN 978-1-59005-286-0.
- Idyll. Orchard Volume Three. Silas Finch, 2011. With Raymond Meeks. ISBN 978-1-93606-318-5. Some include the separate volume Pastoral by Steinmetz, in an edition of 90 copies.
- Summertime. Portland, OR: Nazraeli, 2012. ISBN 978-1590053485.
- Paris in my Time. Portland, OR: Nazraeli, 2013. ISBN 978-1590053744. Edition of 1000 copies.
- The Players. Paso Robles, CA: Nazraeli, 2015. ISBN 978-1590054185. Edition of 1000 copies.
- Fifteen Miles to K-Ville. London: Stanley/Barker, 2015. ISBN 978-0995555501.
- Angel City West: Volume One. NZ Library Set Two, Volume Six. Paso Robles, CA: Nazraeli, 2016. ISBN 978-1-59005-441-3. Edition of 350 copies.
- Angel City West: Volume Two. NZ Library Set Three. Paso Robles, CA: Nazraeli, 2017. ISBN 978-1-59005-455-0. With an introduction by John Bailey. Edition of 350 copies.
- Past K Ville. London: Stanley/Barker, 2018. ISBN 978-1916410626.
- Angel City West: Volume Three. NZ Library. Paso Robles, CA: Nazraeli, 2019. ISBN 978-1-59005-484-0. Edition of 350 copies.
- Carnival. London: Stanley/Barker, 2019. ISBN 978-1-913288-04-4.
- Summer Camp. Paso Robles, CA: Nazraeli, 2019. ISBN 978-1-59005-513-7.
- Cats. One Picture Book Two #16. Paso Robles, CA: Nazraeli, 2020. ISBN 978-1-59005-531-1.
- Berlin Pictures. Berlin: Kominek, 2020. With a text by Thomas Weski. ISBN 978-3-9819824-4-2.
- Chicago. Paso Robles, CA: Nazraeli, 2025. ISBN 978-1-59005-611-0. With an essay by Peter Galassi. Edition of 1500 copies.

=== Books with contributions by Steinmetz ===
- Glister. New Jersey, USA: Glister, 2020. Photographs by Christopher Anderson, JH Engström, Steinmetz, John Sypal, and Ed Templeton. With a transcript of an interview with Templeton.

== Exhibitions ==
=== Solo exhibitions ===
- South, Ogden Museum of Southern Art, New Orleans, 2015
- united states pt 2, Amerikahaus, Munich, Germany, 2017
- Terminus, High Museum of Art, Atlanta, 2018
- united states, Fotohof, Salzburg, Austria, 2019

=== Group exhibitions ===
- New Photography 9: Christopher Giglio, Boris Mihailov, Mark Steinmetz, and Beat Streuli, Museum of Modern Art, New York, 1993/1994

== Awards ==
- 1987: Camargo Fellowship from the Camargo Foundation in Cassis, France
- 1994: Guggenheim Fellowship from the John Simon Guggenheim Memorial Foundation

== Collections ==
Steinmetz's work is held in the following public collections:

- Art Institute of Chicago: 5 prints (as of January 2019)
- Hunter Museum of American Art, Chattanooga, TN: 2 prints (as of January 2019)
- Metropolitan Museum of Art, New York: 2 prints (as of January 2019)
- Museum of Contemporary Photography, Chicago: 1 print (as of January 2019)
- Museum of Modern Art, New York: 23 prints (as of January 2019)
- Nelson-Atkins Museum of Art, Kansas City, MO: 5 prints (as of January 2019)
- Whitney Museum of American Art, New York: 5 prints (as of April 2021)
