= I Am Martin Parr =

2024 British documentary film

- UK theatrical release poster
- Directed by: Lee Shulman
- Written by: Lee Shulman
- Production company: Haut et Court Doc
- Release date: October 17, 2024 (Rome Film Festival)
- Running time: 68 minutes
- Country: France
- Language: English

I Am Martin Parr is a 2024 documentary film directed by Lee Shulman, about Martin Parr. It shadows Parr while he works and shows photographs from across his career.

== Cast ==
- Mark Bedford
- Bruce Gilden
- Martin Parr
- Grayson Perry

== Release ==
I Am Martin Parr had its world premiere on 17 October 2024 at the Rome Film Festival.

== Reception ==
As of 25 February 2025, the film had a 90% rating on Rotten Tomatoes.
