= David Maisel (visual artist) =

American photographer and visual artist (born 1961)

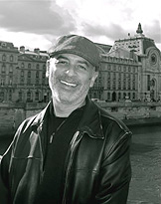
- Born: 1961 (age 64–65); New York City, United States of America
- Education: Bachelor of Arts; Master of Fine Arts
- Known for: Photography and Visual Art
- Website: www.davidmaisel.com

David Maisel (born 1961) is an American photographer and visual artist whose works explore vestiges and remnants of civilizations both past and present. His work has been the subject of five major monographs, published by Nazraeli Press, Chronicle Books, and Steidl.

Maisel was awarded a Guggenheim Fellowship in the Creative Arts in 2018 and a National Endowment for the Arts fellowship in 1990. His work is exhibited internationally and is collected in major museums including the Metropolitan Museum of Art, Los Angeles County Museum of Art, and the Victoria and Albert Museum.

== Education ==
Maisel earned his Bachelor of Arts from Princeton University in 1984 where he studied with Emmet Gowin. He attended the Graduate School of Design at Harvard University, and received an MFA from California College of the Arts in 2006 where he worked with Larry Sultan.

== Photographic work ==
=== Black Maps ===
Black Maps is a multi-chaptered series of aerial photographs of environmentally impacted sites. The series includes surreal and graphic images of open pit mines, cyanide leaching fields, military testing, water reclamation projects, and urban sprawl. Maisel's The Lake Project, a body of work consisting of images from Owens Lake, the site of a formerly 200 square-mile lake in California on the eastern side of the Sierra Mountains, stands out as his most extensive body of work within Black Maps. Maisel worked on The Lake Project in 2001 and 2002, and later went back to photograph in 2015.

A monograph of the work, Black Maps: American Landscape and the Apocalyptic Sublime, was published by Steidl in 2013.

From 2013 through 2015 an exhibition of Black Maps traveled between the Scottsdale Museum of Contemporary Art, Scottsdale, AZ (curated by Claire Carter), CU Art Museum, Boulder, CO (curated by Lisa Becker), Western Washington University Art Gallery, Bellingham, WA (curated by Lisa Becker), and the University of New Mexico Art Museum, Albuquerque, NM (curated by Lisa Becker). In 2016 Maisel gave a lecture at Harvard University Graduate School of Design on Black Maps, moderated by Neil Brenner with panelists Pierre Bélanger, Rosetta Sarah Elkin, and Sharon Harper.

=== Library of Dust ===
Library of Dust focuses on copper canisters containing cremated remains of psychiatric patients from the Oregon State Hospital. The human ash and copper have reacted chemically, causing colorful mineral blooms on the surface of the cans, which are presented as full-frame portraits against black backgrounds. Maisel also photographed abandoned wards and found objects from those wards as part of the series.

In 2009 the New York Institute for the Humanities held a symposium on Library of Dust. The project was published as a monograph by Chronicle Books in 2008.

=== History's Shadow ===
History's Shadow is a rephotographic project in which Maisel worked with x-ray images from art conservation archives from major museums. He began the project while a Scholar in Residence at the Getty Research Institute in Los Angeles and continued the work at the Asian Art Museum of San Francisco. History's Shadow was published as a monograph by Nazraeli Press in 2011.

== Awards ==
- 1990: National Endowment for the Arts fellowship
- 2018: Guggenheim Fellowship in the Creative Arts

== Collections ==
Maisel's work is held in the following permanent collections:

- Metropolitan Museum of Art, New York
- Los Angeles County Museum of Art
- Victoria and Albert Museum, London
