= William Greiner =

American photographer and painter

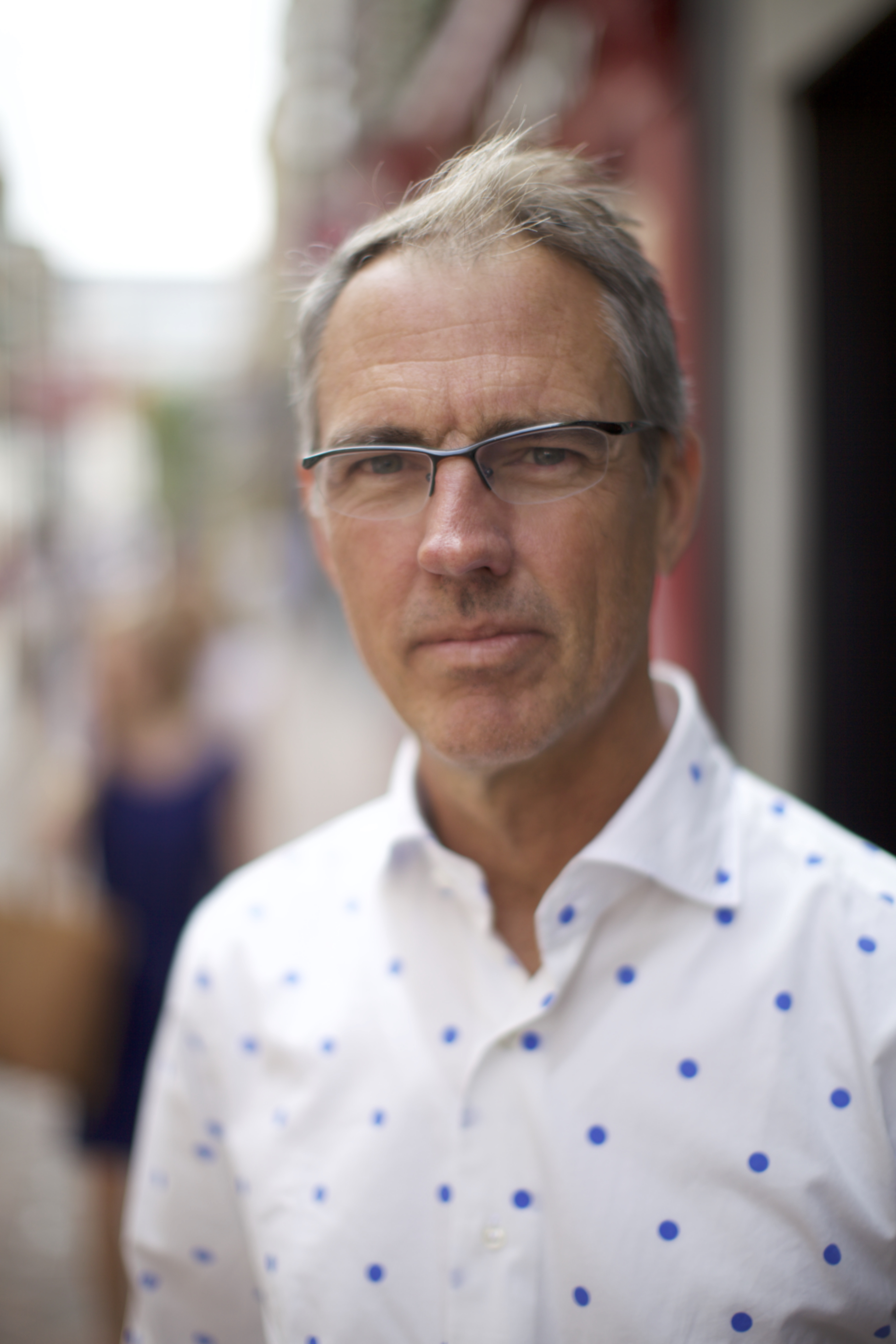
- Born: September 8, 1957 (age 69); New Orleans, Louisiana, United States
- Known for: Photography and Painting

William (Kross) Greiner (born September 8, 1957) in New Orleans, Louisiana, is an American photographer and multi-media artist living in Santa Fe, NM.

== Career ==
Greiner began his career as a sports photographer, first working in the National Football League (NFL) at the age of 19 from 1977 to 1979. He also covered the 1981 and 1982 Tour de France for Bicycling magazine, The New York Times and The Los Angeles Times. Greiner abandoned sports journalism to return to college, earning an A.A. from Bradford College, a B.F.A. from Tufts University/School of the Museum of Fine Art and an M.B.A. from Suffolk University. During this period, Greiner was introduced to the work of musician/artist/photographer, William Eggleston.

== Influences ==
"Well obviously (Wm.) Eggleston as I mentioned, but certainly Clarence John Laughlin, a great New Orleans photographer who has somewhat been overlooked by bigger names. Bill Owens, Ralph Eugene Meatyard, Walker Evans, Robert Frank, too many… I love Milton Avery's work, its flatness and its condensing of the subject to just the necessary elements and details. I also appreciate Edward Hopper for the emotional impact of his scenes. Ralston Crawford is an artist I really admire; because he worked so effectively as a painter, print maker and photographer. His images of New Orleans jazz funerals are really incredible." (Blog interview Ratsalad Deluxe 2005)

== Work and Publications ==
Greiner's first body of color work, The Reposed, was acquired for the Museum of Modern Art (New York City) permanent collection by photography curator John Szarkowski in 1991. The MOMA acquired work was exhibited in a recent acquisitions show at the museum, two years later, in 1993. This work was also published as a monograph by LSU Press in 1999, by the same title.

A 30-minute documentary, William Greiner: Photographer, shot and edited by Tom McDonnell, aired on PBS station WYES-TV, New Orleans, LA, in January, 1994, and PBS station WLRN-TV, Miami, FL, in June,1994. National Public Radio (NPR) Morning Edition, in April 2000, featured an interview with Greiner, conducted by NPR affiliate station KERA reporter Bill Zeeble.

Other publications include A New Life: Stories and Photographs from the Suburban South, work about living in the South, published by W.W. Norton & Company; Visualizing the Blues Blues Foundation / Dixon Gallery and Gardens (2001); and The Story of the South: 1890-2003, Ogden Museum of Southern Art/Scala Publishers, (2003); and Baton Rouge Blues, University of Alabama at Birmingham (2006). Fallen Paradise (New Orleans 1995-2005), and Land's End (Baton Rouge 2007-2010) were published as a limited edition artist books in 2008 and 2010 respectively.

Also published in 2010 and including Greiner's work along with Alex Harris, Edward Burtynsky and Will Steacy amongst others, was the title Migration: Lost and Found in America. This was chosen as one of the Top Ten Books of the Year by American Photo.

In 2012, KnowLA an encyclopedia of Louisiana culture, history and community was published, which included a full biography page about Greiner and his work, written and edited by John H. Lawrence.

The University of Louisiana at Lafayette Press (UL Press) published the title Show & Tell in 2013, a compilation of Greiner's photographs accompanied with short stories by Eric Aronin, Brett Battles, James Scott Bell, Carla Buckley, Joshua Clark, Julie Compton, Colin Costello, Sarah Crawford, Jordan Dane, Linda L. Dunlap, Ken Foster, John Gilstrap, Joe Hartlaub, Fauve Yandel Holigan, Lindsay Holst, Andrew Jasperson, Mari Kornhauser, Pat McGuinness, John Ramsey Miller, Joe Moore, Pat Piper, Renee Rosen, Shanteka Sigers (Shateka Steele), Lloyd Stein, Pam Thomas, John Kenny, Jeff Roedel, and Jenny Milchman.

Greiner had his first painting/collage work, "Where I've Been, New Orleans 2014", published in the catalog REPARATION (the Luciano Benetton Collection), edited and curated by Diego Cortez, in 2014. The work was exhibited at the New Orleans Museum of Art, before being sent to Italy and the Benetton Collection.

Greiner’s work was included in two recently published anthologies, RECKONINGS and RECONSTRUCTIONS (Southern Photography from The Do Good Fund), 2022, Georgia Museum of Art, University of Georgia, and LOUISIANA LENS, 2023, The Historic New Orleans Collection.

UNO Press published Greiner’s third monograph in 2025, titled NEUTRAL GROUND (New Orleans 1990-2005).

== Awards ==
Greiner was awarded a Louisiana Endowment for the Arts (LEA) Fellowship in 2004.

== Permanent collections and exhibitions ==
Greiners' photographs can be found in over sixty permanent museum collections, including the Museum of Modern Art (New York City), Ogden Museum of Southern Art in New Orleans; The Addison Gallery of American Art in Andover, Massachusetts; Art Institute of Chicago in Illinois; plus the J. Paul Getty Museum and the San Francisco Museum of Modern Art in California.

In 1993, Greiner's work was exhibited in a two-man show with William Eggleston at the Contemporary Arts Center, New Orleans.

William Eggleston and the Color Tradition, an exhibition exploring the art of American color photography over the last 30 years, was on view at the J. Paul Getty Museum from October 26, 1999 through January 30, 2000. The exhibition included work by Greiner along with: Adam Bartos, Virginia Beahan and Laura McPhee, John Divola, Jim Dow, Mitch Epstein, Rhea Garen, Alex Harris, David Husom, Stephen Johnson, William Larson, and Joel Sternfeld.

In 2003, Greiner's work was selected to be part of Wait Until Dark along with Lewis Baltz, Todd Hido, David Levinthal, Thomas Tulis, Michael Kenna, O. Winston Link, Richard Misrach, George Tice and Henry Wessel, Jr. The exhibition took place at The Williams College Museum of Art, Williamstown, Massachusetts.

Along with William Claxton and Stuart Klipper, Greiner participated in a music themed exhibition at the Acadiana Center for the Arts, in Lafayette, Louisiana, which ran from January to March, 2006.

Klompching Gallery in New York, New York, held Greiners' first commercial solo exhibition in the New York market in 2008.

Greiner participated in the group exhibition, Economy of Scale, at Hemphill Fine Arts in Washington, D.C., in 2009. The exhibition also included work by William Christenberry, Robert Frank, Sebastiao Salgado and David Byrne.

Also in 2009, Greiner participate in the web-based book project, 50 States, along with photographers Lisa Kereszi, Brian Ulrich, Andrew Borowiec and Shawn Records, among others.

The Morris Museum of Art held the exhibition Local Color: Photography in the South, between December 2011 and January 2012, which included work by Greiner, Birney Imes, William Eggleston, Dave Anderson and William Christenberry.

Solo exhibitions of his work were held at the Louisiana Art & Science Museum in 2008 and the New Orleans Museum of Art in 2010. The Louisiana State University Glassell Gallery, in Baton Rouge, held a solo exhibition of Greiner's work, in fall 2013. PDNB Gallery in Dallas, TX, mounted the solo exhibition Leaving Love Field, an exploration of a motorcade route to history, from November to December 2013.

Photographs Do Not Bend Gallery also mounted the group exhibition, William Eggleston: His Circle & Beyond the fall of 2013. This exhibition included work by Greiner, Birney Imes, William Christenberry, and Peter Brown, among others.

The Morris Museum of Art in Augusta, GA exhibited the series OH AUGUSTA in a solo exhibition, 2014. Montgomery-based gallery Triumph & Disaster mounted a group exhibition of work by Greiner, William Christenberry, Birney Imes, and William Eggleston in 2014.

In 2015, Greiner participated in group exhibitions at Ogden Museum of Southern Art, New Orleans Museum of Art and David Lusk Gallery in Memphis, TN. The solo exhibition of photographs and silk screen prints, AUTOMATIC was held at STUDIO 65A in London, UK, May- June, 2015.

The Historic New Orleans Collection acquired the collage/painting, "Seeing New Orleans" in 2015. The first non-photographic work by the artist to be acquired by an institutional collection.

In 2016, Greiner had work included in group exhibitions at The Do Good Fund (a non-profit organization promoting Southern photography) in Athens, GA, Photographs Do Not Bend Gallery in Dallas, TX, Amon Carter Museum of American Art, ArtSpace 111 (both in Fort Worth TX) and The Louisiana Arts and Science Museum in Baton Rouge, LA.

The collage/painting titled "Not Sherman's March, GA 2014", was purchased by the Morris Museum of Art in January 2017. "NEAR & FAR", a project including photographs, collage, painting and sculpture was exhibited in a dual exhibition with Nancy Lamb in Fort Worth, TX at Artspace 111, December 2016-February, 2017. Harry Ransom Center acquired the photograph "Where Mary Moorman Stood, 2013." This work was part of a large collection of photographs and collages tilted, "Leaving Love Field."

Greiner participated in Past/Present/Future, a summer group exhibition at the Emmett Till Interpretive Center, held September 22–October 23, 2017. His work was also featured in Hattiesburg, MS at The University of Southern Mississippi in Portraits of Southerners: Photographs from The Do Good Fund exhibition, October 12–November 3, 2017.

The Ogden Museum of Southern Art in New Orleans, held The Colourful South exhibition, June 10, 2017 – October 26, 2017, which explored the role color photography has played in the history of Southern photography and beyond. The exhibition featured five pioneers in color photography: William Christenberry, Birney Imes, William Greiner, William Ferris and Alec Soth.

The Morris Museum of Art in Augusta, GA mounted the exhibition Acquired and Restored: Recent Additions to the Permanent Collection, September 16 to December 31, 2017, which included a photograph by Greiner.

The National Portrait Gallery, London, acquired seven portraits of prominent British citizens by Greiner in 2017. Subjects included John Byrne, playwright, Ben Brown (journalist) and London based street photographer Dougie Wallace, amongst others.

In 2017, Greiner produced a limited edition portfolio of New Orleans Mardi Gras portraits, titled NEW ORLEANS - 2017. Examples were acquired for permanent collection by The Historic New Orleans Collection and The Do Good Fund.

In 2018, the limited edition portraits portfolio, NEW ORLEANS 2017, was acquired by both The Historic New Orleans Collection and The Do Good Fund, Columbus GA.

Artspace111 in Fort Worth, TX, featured Greiner in three exhibitions in 2018: A group show titled, Sussie- An exhibition of Small Works, opened December 7, 2017 - January 27, 2018. This was followed by City Symphony, a group exhibition that ran February 7 - March 17, 2018. A two-man exhibition, featuring painter Dan Blagg and William Greiner, titled Urban Alterations, opened on October 1 - December 1, 2018.

A portraits exhibition, MASKED/UNMASKED featured a group of New Orleans portraits by Greiner. The exhibition was held at the Fort Worth Community Art Center, July 6–27, 2018. The Montgomery Museum of Art, in conjunction with The Do Good Fund, featured a selection of Greiner’s works in the show, Views of the South, September 29, 2018 - January 6, 2019.

The Morris Museum of Art opened LOCAL COLOR - Photography in the South, on December 8, 2018 thru February 17, 2019. The exhibition included one of Greiner’s best known images from the monograph, The Reposed; Blue Heart, Houma LA 1989

In 2019, The LSU Museum of Art, Baton Rouge, LA, acquired the limited edition portraits portfolio NEW ORLEANS 2017.

PDNB Gallery in Dallas TX., opened HOUSES FOR SALE, featuring a selection of images from Greiner's series, Homefront. The exhibition also featured work by Bill Owens (photographer), Chris Verene, Keith Carter and Jason Lee (actor). The show ran January 5 - March 2, 2019.

The Westmont Ridley - Tree Museum held the exhibition, WATERSHEW - Contemporary Landscape Photography, January 18 - March 23, 2019. The image, "TV in Bayou, Chalmette, LA 1994" is featured.

The Historic New Orleans Collection exhibited Art of the City: Postmodern to Post-Katrina in April 2019.

In December 2020, the National Portrait Gallery (United States) acquired the portrait "William Eggleston L.A. CA 1999”. The Fort Worth Community Art Center, Fort Worth, TX, mounted the multi-displinary project, UNUSUAL POLITICS, which included paintings, drawings, photographs, collage, prints and sculpture, in the summer of 2020. Greiner’s color photographs and collages were also featured in two group exhibitions at Artspace111 in Fort Worth during the 2020 exhibition season. A new sculptural series, titled Aspirational Recycling, was conceived and executed in 2020.

In 2022, The Santa Barbara Museum of Art, Santa Barbara, CA, acquired the portrait, "William Eggleston L.A. CA 1999."

Along with Dallas-based abstract painter Matt Clark, Greiner participated in a collaborative photography/painting project titled, The Space Between, with well received exhibitions at Conduit Gallery (Dallas, TX) and ArtspaceIII (Fort Worth, TX). A third exhibition of new collaborative work from this series will be exhibited at The Webster Collection (Santa Fe NM) in May 2024.

In 2025, Greiner collaborated with artist X New Worlds to present an experimental AI film, Corvus, during the British Art Fair at Saatchi Gallery in London. In 2026, Corvus went on to win Best AI short at the Philadelphia Independent Film Festival and Best Experimental Short at the Independent Shorts Awards International Film Festival in Los Angeles, California. Corvus was also exhibited at the Bloomsday Film Festival in Dublin, Ireland.

== Bibliography ==
- A New Life ISBN 0-393-04030-5
- Migration: Lost and Found in America (2010) ISBN 978-1-932907-82-7
