= Melanie Pullen =

American photographer (born 1975)

- Born: Melanie Pullen; 1975 (age 50–51); New York, New York
- Education: Self-educated
- Known for: Photographer and artist
- Notable work: High Fashion Crime Scenes, 1995–2005; Violent Times, 2005–2009

Melanie Pullen (born 1975) is an American photographer who lives and works in Los Angeles, California.

== Early life and early inspiration ==
Pullen was born in New York City and raised in the West Village. As a child her family consisted of writers, publishers, poets and painters. Her childhood home was frequented in the 1970s and 1980s by Andy Warhol, Allen Ginsberg, Emily Glen and Shel Silverstein. Pullen at the age of six would sometimes perform in Washington Square Park with Philippe Petit (Man on Wire) in his neighborhood shows.

Kathleen Guilfoyle, Pullen's mother, is a painter and supported her family through painting murals in Manhattan's Greenwich Village and through peddling her works on the streets of New York. Pullen's father, Wayne Pullen, played professional pool.

Shortly after acquiring her first camera in her teens she began shooting for several publications, magazines, catalogs, and record labels. She photographed rock bands.

== Photographic art ==
Pullen is inspired by geometry, and she loves lines and symmetry.

She is most noted for High Fashion Crime Scenes which consists of over one-hundred photographs based on NYPD and LAPD crime scene files. Pullen's monograph High Fashion Crime Scenes received critical acclaim from Spin.

To create High Fashion Crime Scenes (1995–2005), Pullen employed the services of up to 80 crew members and models per picture, with each image taking up to a month to create, and the series using over $13 million worth of clothing and accessories. Her photo shoots often resemble movie sets. High Fashion Crime Scenes in particular was inspired by cinema and photojournalism.

During her research into crime-scene photography, Pullen became haunted by war imagery. Pullen states,

"As I grew desensitized to domestic crime and violence, I became more sensitized to images of war. It was a strange phenomenon that I've explored and philosophized. I don't like violence, I have never been a dark person. I see stories and different layers to violent imagery. I'm curious about the response people have to violent images."

== Publications ==
High Fashion Crime Scenes. One Picture Book 78. Nazraeli Press. ISBN 978-1590051368. With an introduction by Luke Crisell and essays by both Robert Enright and Colin Westerbech. Edition of 500 copies.

== Solo exhibitions ==
- 2004: High Fashion Crime Scenes, Presented by Los Angeles County Museum of Art's 10th Annual Muse Art Walk, Los Angeles, CA
- 2010: High Fashion Crime Scenes, Wignall Museum of Contemporary Art, Los Angeles
- 2011: Project Atrium: Melanie Pullen, Museum of Contemporary Art Jacksonville, Jacksonville, FL
