= Ellen Fleurov =

Ellen Fleurov is an American museum curator and photography historian. She is the president and founder of Crossroads Traveling Exhibitions.

From 1993 to 1998, Fleurov was the curator of photography at the High Museum of Art in Atlanta, Georgia. Subsequently she was the director of the museum at the California Center for the Arts in San Diego from 1998 to 2001. In 2009, Fleurov was appointed director of the Silver Eye Center for Photography.

Flearov has curated a number of photography exhibitions.
