= Toshio Shibata =

Japanese photographer

Toshio Shibata (柴田 敏雄, Shibata Toshio; born 1949) is a Japanese photographer known for his large-format photographs of large-scale works of civil engineering in unpopulated landscapes.

Shibata was born in Tokyo. He graduated from Tokyo University of the Arts with a B.A. in 1972 and an M.F.A. in 1974 in which he concentrated primarily on painting. Shibata received a fellowship from the Belgian Ministry of Education to study at the Royal Academy of Ghent in Belgium from 1975 to 1977 and begin his study of photography during this period. He held his first solo exhibition of photography in 1979 and has exhibited prolifically since; from 1987 he has also taught photography in Tokyo.

== Awards ==
- 1975, 1976
  - Fellowship, Ministry of Education, Belgium
- 1992
  - The 17th Kimura Ihei Award, Asahi Shimbun Publishing Co.

== Books ==
- Nihon tenkei (日本典型) / Photographs by Toshio Shibata. Tokyo: Asahi Shinbunsha, 1992. ISBN 4-02-256508-X.
- With Yoshio Nakamura (中村良夫, Nakamura Yoshio). Tera: Sōkei suru daichi: Shashinshū (テラ: 創景する大地: 写真集) / Terra. Tokyo: Toshi Shuppan, 1994. ISBN 4-924831-12-3.
- Landscape. Tucson, Ariz.: Nazraeli, 1996. ISBN 3-923922-46-9.
- Toshio Shibata: October 11, 1997 through January 4, 1998. Chicago: Museum of Contemporary Art, 1997. ISBN 0-933856-51-2.
- Shibata Toshio Visions of Japan. Kyoto: Korinsha, 1998. ISBN 4771328056.
- Type 55. Tucson, Ariz.: Nazraeli, 2004. ISBN 1-59005-075-4.
- Dam. Nazraeli, 2004. ISBN 1-59005-081-9.
- Juxtapose. Kamakura, Kanagawa: Kamakura Gallery, 2005.
- Landscape 2. Portland, Ore.: Nazraeli, 2008. ISBN 978-1-59005-238-9. Color photographs.
- Still in the Night. Koganei, Tokyo: Soh Gallery, 2008. Black and white night views, 1982–86 of expressways in Japan. Captions and text in Japanese and English.
- Randosukēpu: Shibata Toshio (ランドスケープ: 柴田敏雄). Tokyo: Ryokō Yomiuri Shuppansha, 2008. ISBN 978-4-89752-285-2. Black and white and color photographs.
- Contacts, Poursuite Éditions, 2013, ISBN 978-2-918960-70-6
