= Nazraeli Press =

- Status: Active
- Founded: 1989
- Founder: Chris Pichler
- Country of origin: Germany
- Headquarters location: Paso Robles, California
- Publication types: Books
- Nonfiction topics: Photography
- Official website: www.nazraeli.com, www.nazraeli.co.uk

Nazraeli Press is a publisher of books of photography. It was founded in 1989, in Munich, Germany, by Chris Pichler and has been based in the US since 1996.

Nazraeli publishes roughly 30 new titles each year and has published over 400 with work by photographers from the United States, South America, Europe and Asia. Pichler runs the company with director Alison Crosby. Nazraeli publishes traditional monograph books, and also produces books in various niche series where each series has its own characteristics: One Picture Book, NZ Library, and Six by Six.

Nazraeli has been based in Germany (1989–1996), Tucson, Arizona (1996–2001?), Portland, Oregon (2001 – 2014/2015?) and Paso Robles, California. (since 2014/2015?). It has facilities in Manchester, England, for sales in Europe.

== Book categories ==
Nazraeli publishes traditional monographs with print runs up to 3000 copies, and also produces these book series:

- One Picture Book – small sized format, hardcover, uniformly designed, 16 pages long, with a signed and numbered tipped-in print (signed on the verso by the artist, hence the name of the series). Produced in groups of four titles at a time, approximately twice a year, in editions of 500 copies. The authors are both established photographers and unpublished, lesser-known photographers. One Picture Book were first published in 2000 and will cease in this format in 2016 with the hundredth publication.
- NZ Library – 12 x 15 inches in size, in a slipcase. Produced as a set of six new titles, once or twice a year, in editions of 350 copies.
- Six by Six – oversized, in a slipcase, with a loose signed print. A total of six sets will be produced every six months, each set containing six titles, in editions of 100 copies.

In conjunction with Joy of Giving Something (JGS), Nazraeli distributed the seven issues of JGS' journal, Witness, between 2007 and 2009. For each issue a different photographer guest edited – choosing their own work and that of others for inclusion, and designing the cover and much of the contents.

== Selected authors ==
Some of the people whose work has been published by Nazraeli Press:

- Robert Adams (I Hear the Leaves and Love the Light, 1999; Boddhisattva: A Gandharan Face, 2001; Alders, 2002; Pine Valley, 2005; A Portrait in Landscapes, 2005; Interiors 1973–1974, 2006; Still Lives at Manzanita, 2006; The Question of Hope: Photographs in Western Oregon, 2013)
- Peter Fraser (Peter Fraser, 2006)
- Lee Friedlander (Staglieno, 2002)
- Todd Hido (House Hunting, 2001; Outskirts, 2002; Taft Street, One Picture Book 6, 2001; Roaming, 2004; Between the Two, 2006; Crooked Cracked Tree in Fog, One Picture Book 60, 2009; Cracked Trees, One Picture Book 59, 2009; A Road Divided, 2010; Motel Club, Six by Six, set 1 v. 4, 2010; Leon Borensztein: American Portraits 1979-1989, 2011; Excerpts from Silver Meadows, 2013; B-Sides - Silver Meadows, 2014; "Bright Black World," 2018)
- John Humble (Manifest Destiny, 2016; Pico Boulevard, 2021)
- Bill Jay (Occam's Razor: Outside-in Viewing Contemporary Photography, 1994)
- Michael Kenna (the majority of his publications)
- David Maisel (History's Shadow, 2007)
- Richard Misrach (iPhone Studies: Reverse Scrubs, One Picture Book 82, 2013; Misrach, Six by Six, set 5, 2014)
- Daido Moriyama (Memories of a Dog, 2004; Self, One Picture Book 90, 2015)
- Martin Parr (7 Communist Still Lifes, One Picture Book 17, 2003; 7 Colonial Still Lifes, One Picture Book 28, 2005; 7 Cups of Tea, One Picture Book 74, 2012; Machu Picchu, Six by Six, set 1 v. 4, 2010)
- Melanie Pullen (High Fashion Crime Scenes, 2005)
- Alessandra Sanguinetti (On the Sixth Day, 2005; The Adventures of Guille and Belinda and the Enigmatic Meaning of Their Dreams, 2010).
- Stephen Shore (Essex County, 2006; Merced River, One Picture Book 43, 2009)
- Alec Soth (One Mississippi, 2010)
