= Ron Jude =

American photographer and educator

Ron A. Jude (born 1965) is an American photographer and educator, living in Eugene, Oregon. His photography, which "often explores the relationship between people, place, nature and memory", has been published in a number of books. Jude works as a professor of art at the University of Oregon.

He has had solo exhibitions at the High Museum of Art, Sheldon Museum of Art, The Photographers' Gallery in London, and was included in a three-person exhibition at the Museum of Contemporary Photography (MoCP) in Chicago. His work is held in the collections of the George Eastman Museum; High Museum of Art, MoCP, Museum of Contemporary Art of Georgia, Ogden Museum of Southern Art and San Francisco Museum of Modern Art. In 2019 he received a Guggenheim Fellowship.

== Life and work ==
Jude was born in Covina, Los Angeles County, California, and raised in rural Idaho. He gained a Bachelor of Fine Arts from Boise State University, Boise, Idaho in 1988; participated in the American Photography Institute's National Graduate Seminar at Tisch School of the Arts, New York University, New York City in 1991; and gained a Master of Fine Arts from Louisiana State University, Baton Rouge in 1992. As of 2012 he was living in Upstate New York.

Jude's photographic work "often explores the relationship between people, place, nature and memory." As of 2020 he is living in Eugene, Oregon where he works as a professor of art at the University of Oregon. He is the co-founder of A-Jump Books.

Alpine Star (2006) contains photographs appropriated from the weekly newspaper in Jude's hometown in Central Idaho.

Other Nature (2008) depicts exterior and interior details of "anonymous motel rooms and the stranger regions of the American landscape". It combines two separate sets of Jude's 4×5 color photographs, made between 2001 and 2008.

Emmett (2010) contains a selection of his earliest work, made in the early 1980s in central Idaho and edited nearly 30 years later. The pictures are "enhanced by "special effects" filters and cheap telephoto lenses".

Lick Creek Line (2012) follows a fur trapper trekking in a remote area of Idaho in the Western United States. "Through converging pictures of landscapes, architecture, an encroaching resort community, and the solitary, secretive process of trapping pine marten for their pelts," "Lick Creek Line tells a story, while constantly subverting it again."

Executive Model (2012) contains photographs of American businessmen in the financial districts of Atlanta, Chicago, New York City and San Francisco between 1992 and 1995. It is "an exploration of the corporate executive as a representative type, as a locus of many of our unspoken assumptions about masculinity, social privilege, race, and power. [. . . ] In the majority of images in Executive Model, the men are seen from the back, their hulking forms filling nearly two-thirds of the frame. In other works, Jude depicts fragmented close-ups of turned heads or gesturing hands."

Lago (2015) was made in the Salton Sea desert in Southern California, "the region Jude was raised in from the mid-1960s."

Vitreous China (2016) contains photographs made in areas of light industry in (primarily) Midwestern American cities, in particular "the ambient peripheral zones suffusing these environments: big rig parking lots, side exits, and other secondary spaces". Jude's grandfather worked as a kiln operator in plants using vitreous china, an enamel coating applied to porcelain. The photographs are interspersed with short texts by Mike Slack.

Nausea (2017) was made in a number of elementary schools across several Southern states in the USA between 1991 and 1992.

12Hz (2020) was made in Oregon, California, New Mexico, Hawaii, and Iceland between 2017 and 2020. Its larger first section mostly depicts tightly cropped views of rocks, ice sheets, volcanoes and raging bodies of water, "with only occasional minor appearances of flora". Its second much shorter part depicts "tightly cropped parts of vegetation." The work, made in black and white, speaks of "forces of ungraspable scale, operating independently of our anthropocentric experiences".

== Publications ==
=== Books of work by Jude ===
- Other Nature. Los Angeles: Ice Plant, 2008. ISBN 978-0-9776481-6-0.
- Emmett. Los Angeles: Ice Plant, 2010. ISBN 978-0-9823653-2-8.
- Lick Creek Line. London: Mack, 2012. ISBN 9781907946172. With an essay by Nicholas Muellner.
- Executive Model. Stockholm: Libraryman, 2012. ISBN 978-91-86269-26-5. Edition of 325 copies.
- Fires. Santa Monica: Ram; Chicago: Museum of Contemporary Photography, 2013. ISBN 978-0-9703860-8-3. Exhibition catalog. Work from Alpine Star, Emmett and Lick Creek Line.
- Lago. London: Mack, 2015. ISBN 978-1-910164-34-1.
- Vitreous China. Stockholm: Libraryman, 2016. ISBN 978-91-88113-04-7. With short texts by Mike Slack. Edition of 400 copies.
- Nausea. London: Mack, 2017. ISBN 978-1-910164-79-2.
- 12Hz. London: Mack, 2020. ISBN 978-1-912339-92-1. With a text by Paul Kingsnorth.

=== Other publications by Jude ===
- Alpine Star. Ithaca: Self-published / A-Jump, 2006. ISBN 978-0977765508. Edition of 500 copies. Photographs from a newspaper.
- Postcards. Ithaca: Self-published / A-Jump, 2006. ISBN 978-0-9777655-1-5. Edition of 500 copies. Unbound photographs in a slipcase.

=== Publications with contributions by Jude ===
- Lost Home. Kamakura, Japan: Super Labo, 2013. ISBN 978-4-905052-57-9. Ten photographers, each of whom contribute a volume, respond to a prose poem by Nobuyuki Ishiki. Eleven volumes in a slipcase. Text in Japanese and English. Edition of 1000 copies.

== Awards ==
- 1994: Aaron Siskind Foundation Individual Photographer's Fellowship, New York
- 2000 James D. Phelan Award in Photography, SF Camerawork, San Francisco, California
- 2001: Light Work Grant, Syracuse, New York for the project Landscapes (for Antoine)
- 2006: Constance Saltonstall Foundation for the Arts 2006–2007 Artist's Grant
- 2019: Guggenheim Fellowship, John Simon Guggenheim Memorial Foundation, New York City

== Exhibitions ==
=== Solo exhibitions ===
- Nausea, The Photographers' Gallery, London, 1992
- Executive Model: An Installation by Ron Jude, High Museum of Art, Atlanta, Georgia, 1995
- Lago, Sheldon Museum of Art, Lincoln, Nebraska, 2016

=== Exhibitions with others ===
- Backstory, Museum of Contemporary Photography, Chicago, Illinois, 2013 with LaToya Ruby Frazier and Guillaume Simoneau.

== Collections ==
- George Eastman Museum, Rochester, New York: 37 prints and postcards (as of December 2020)
- High Museum of Art, Atlanta, Georgia: 4 prints (as of December 2020)
- Light Work, Syracuse, NY: 2 prints and 1 sequence of 12 prints (as of December 2020)
- Museum of Contemporary Art of Georgia, Atlanta, Georgia: 3 prints (as of December 2020)
- Museum of Contemporary Photography, Chicago, Illinois: 24 prints (as of December 2020)
- Ogden Museum of Southern Art, New Orleans, Louisiana: 3 prints (as of December 2020)
- San Francisco Museum of Modern Art, San Francisco, California: 2 prints (as of December 2020)
