= Harvey Benge =

New Zealand photographer (1944–2019)

Harvey Benge (27 July 1944 – 7 October 2019) was a New Zealand photographer who lived in Auckland and Paris. He exhibited his work in European galleries.

== Life and work ==
Benge claimed that his photography was inspired by anything that attracted his attention while walking in the city. He stated that "the most successful photography raises questions, offers something else to the viewer".

In May 2007 he started his photo-blog called Photography + Art + Ideas on the Blogger platform to write about photography, photobooks, art and photographic concepts. He continued his writing and published his last article on 24 June 2019.

Benge's first book, Four Parts Religion, Six Parts Sin was about Auckland. His second was about the Dalai Lama's visit to New Zealand. Not Here. Not There, contains cityscapes. You Are Here (2007) chronicled his visit to Tokyo and was shortlisted for the Prix du Livre at the 2006 Rencontres d'Arles. He was twice a finalist of the award. In 2008 he started his own imprint FAQ, based in his home/studio in Auckland, NA as a publishing platform for his self-published books and zines, later including a small signed photographic print with each copy.

Benge died on 7 October 2019 at the age of 75.

== Publications ==
- Four Parts Religion, Six Parts Sin. Photoforum, New Zealand: 1993. ISBN 9780473021245. With an introduction by Warwick Roger.
- A Celebration of Kindness: His Holiness the 14th Dalai Lama, New Zealand, September 1996. Dunedin, N.Z.: Trust for the Visit of His Holiness the Dalai Lama to New Zealand, 1996. ISBN 9780473042684.
- Not Here. Not There. Stockport, UK: Dewi Lewis, 1998. ISBN 978-1899235766.
- Vital signs. Stockport, UK: Dewi Lewis, 2000. ISBN 9781899235476.
- Lucky Box: a Guide to Modern Living. Stockport, UK: Dewi Lewis, 2001. ISBN 9781899235933.
- First Ever Pictures of God. 2003. ISBN 9782911136047.
- Performance. 2005.
- Killing Time in Paradise. Cologne, Germany: Schaden, 2005. ISBN 9783932187476.
- You Are Here. 2007. Cologne, Germany: Schaden, 2006. Edition of 275 copies.
- My House, my Head. Self-published, 2007. OCLC 226971287. Edition of 200 copies.
- I Look at You, You Look at Me. Auckland, NZ: FAQ, 2008. ISBN 9780473139001. Edition of 300 copies.
- Text Book. Auckland, NZ: FAQ, 2008. ISBN 9780473141011. Edition of 300 copies.
- Sometimes a Cigar is Just a Cigar. Auckland, NZ: FAQ, 2008. ISBN 9780473139674. Edition of 300 copies.
- You Won't be with me Tomorrow. Auckland, NZ: FAQ, 2009. ISBN 9780473151461.
- Small Anarchies from Home. Auckland, NZ: FAQ, ISBN 9780473152734.
- Against Forgetting. Auckland, NZ: FAQ, OCLC 649419691. Edition of 100 copies.
- All the Places I've Ever Known. Heidelberg, Germany: Kehrer, 2010. ISBN 9783868281477.
- As it is? in Four Chapters. Auckland, NZ: FAQ, 2010. ISBN 9780473152734.
- Some of John's Friends. Auckland, NZ: FAQ, 2011. OCLC 756797365.
- Truth and Various Deceptions. Auckland, NZ: FAQ, 2011. OCLC 759931627.
- Skytower. Auckland, NZ: FAQ, 2011. OCLC 755962717. Edition of 50 copies.
- Paris Diary, November 2010. Auckland, NZ: FAQ, 2011. OCLC 756797364. Edition of 75 copies.
- Three Days in Kassel in June. Auckland, NZ: FAQ, 2011. OCLC 749389941.
- Cologne Stopover, June 2011. Auckland, NZ: FAQ, 2011. OCLC 749389858.
- Rome Pocket Guide. Auckland, NZ: FAQ, 2011. OCLC 781851424.
- Still Looking for it. Auckland, NZ: FAQ, 2011. OCLC 733659844. Edition of 75 copies.
- Sri Lanka Diary, February 2011. Auckland, NZ: FAQ, 2011. OCLC 733600257. Edition of 75 copies.
- Some Things You Should Have Told Me. Stockport, UK: Dewi Lewis, 2013.
- Paris, November 2013. Auckland, NZ: FAQ, 2013. OCLC 881345601. Edition of 50 copies.
- HB/AKL/MEL/SYD/AKL/21-26/5/2014 /. Auckland, NZ: FAQ, 2014. OCLC 904320367.
- You Won't be with me Tomorrow. Stockport, UK: Dewi Lewis, 2014. ISBN 9781907893650.
- Not Food or Sex. Auckland, NZ: FAQ, 2015. OCLC 1050145979. Edition of 50 copies.
- Un-solved Puzzles Re-main. FAQ, Auckland: 2015. OCLC 1050151110. Edition of 50 copies.
- The Month Before Trump. FAQ, Self-published, Auckland, NZ, 2017. Edition of 50 copies.
- The Lament. Stockport, UK: Dewi Lewis, 2017. ISBN 978-1911306153.
- Home Town Dream. Auckland, NZ: FAQ, 2017. Edition of 50 copies.
