= Jason Fulford =

American photographer, publisher and educator (born 1973)

- Born: 1973 (age 52–53)
- Occupations: Photographer; publisher; educator
- Spouse: Tamara Shopsin

Jason Fulford (born 1973) is an American photographer, publisher and educator, based in Brooklyn, New York City and Scranton, Pennsylvania.

== Career ==
The primary format for Fulford's own photography is the book, which includes Sunbird (2000), Crushed (2003), Raising Frogs For $$$ (2006), The Mushroom Collector (2010), Hotel Oracle (2013), Contains: 3 Books (2016), The Medium is a Mess (2018), and Clayton's Ascent (2018). He has had a solo exhibition at the Minneapolis Institute of Art and is the recipient of a Guggenheim Fellowship. He is a Visiting Lecturer at Harvard University.

In 2000, Fulford and Leanne Shapton founded the non-profit publisher J&L Books, where he is publisher, editor, and book designer. He works as a photographer and has lectured at various universities.

Fulford's photographs have been featured in The Atlantic, Harper's, The New Yorker, The New York Times, The New York Times Magazine, and Topic.

== Personal life ==
He is based in Brooklyn, New York City, and is married to Tamara Shopsin.

== Publications ==
=== Publications of photographs by Fulford ===
- Sunbird. With text by Adam Gilders. Atlanta, GA: Bird Entertainment. 2000. ISBN 978-0-9701656-0-2.
- Crushed. Atlanta, GA: J&L. 2003. ISBN 978-0-9701656-7-1.
- Raising Frogs for $$$. Los Angeles, CA: The Ice Plant. 2006. ISBN 978-0-9776481-1-5.
- The Mushroom Collector. Edited by Lorenzo De Rita. Amsterdam: Soon. 2010. ISBN 978-90-810584-2-1.
- Notes on Fulford's Raising Frogs for $$$. Los Angeles, CA: The Ice Plant. 2011. ISBN 978-0-9823653-5-9.
- Hotel Oracle. Edited by Lorenzo De Rita. First edition. Edition of 1000 copies. Amsterdam: The Soon Institute. 2013. ISBN 978-90-810584-4-5.
  - Hotel Oracle. Edited by Lorenzo De Rita. Second edition. Edition of 1000 copies. Amsterdam: The Soon Institute. 2014. ISBN 978-90-810584-5-2.
- Contains: 3 Books. Three volumes in a box: Mild Moderate Severe Profound, I Am Napoleon and &&. Edited by Lorenzo De Rita. Amsterdam: The Soon Institute. 2016. ISBN 978-90-810584-7-6.
- The Medium Is a Mess. Edition of 500 copies. Reggio Emilia: Studio Blanco. 2018.
- Clayton's Ascent. TBW Subscription Series 6, Book 2. Fulford, Guido Guidi, Gregory Halpern, and Viviane Sassen each had one book in a set of four. Edition of 1000 copies. Oakland, CA: TBW. 2018. ISBN 978-1-942953-33-3.
- Picture Summer on Kodak Film. London: Mack. 2020. ISBN 978-1-912339-74-7.
- The Heart Is a Sandwich. London: Mack. 2023. ISBN 978-1-913620-96-7.
- Lots of Lots. London: Mack. 2025. ISBN 978-1-915743-46-6.
- Frozen Features. Marseille: Loose Joints. 2026. ISBN 978-1-912719-79-2.

=== Publications about art for young readers ===
- This Equals That. With Tamara Shopsin. New York: Aperture. 2014. ISBN 978-1-59711-288-8.
- Find Colors. With Tamara Shopsin, in partnership with the Whitney Museum of American Art. London: Phaidon. 2018. ISBN 978-0-7148-7659-7.
- These Colors Are Bananas. With Tamara Shopsin, in partnership with the Whitney Museum of American Art. London: Phaidon. 2018. ISBN 978-0-7148-7660-3.
- A Pile of Leaves. With Tamara Shopsin, in partnership with the Whitney Museum of American Art. London: Phaidon. 2018. ISBN 978-0-7148-7720-4.
- Art This Way. With Tamara Shopsin, in partnership with the Whitney Museum of American Art. London: Phaidon. 2018. ISBN 978-0-7148-7721-1.

=== Publications edited by Fulford ===
- The Photographer's Playbook: 307 Assignments and Ideas. Edited by Fulford and Gregory Halpern. New York: Aperture. 2014. ISBN 978-1-59711-247-5.
- Good 70s. By Mike Mandel, with text by Sandra Phillips. Edited by Fulford and Sharon Gallagher. Atlanta/New York: J&L/D.A.P. 2015. ISBN 978-0-9895311-4-6.
- Where to Score. Edited by Fulford and Jordan Stein. Atlanta/San Francisco: J&L/Kadist. 2018. ISBN 978-0-9993655-1-9.
- "Der Greif". Der Greif. Vol. 11. Edited by Fulford. Munich. 2018. ISSN 2191-4524.
- Photo No-No's: Meditations on What Not to Photograph. New York: Aperture. 2021. ISBN 978-1-59711-499-8.
- Ordinary Things Will Be Signs for Us: Photographs by Corita. Edited by Julie Ault, Fulford and Jordan Weitzman. Atlanta/New York: J&L/Magic Hour. 2023. ISBN 978-0-9993655-5-7.
- 47 Fotos. Photographs by Bruno Munari and Jason Fulford. Edited by Fulford. Mantova: Maurizio Corraini. 2024. ISBN 979-12-5493-131-8.

=== Publications with contributions by Fulford ===
- Trunk, Penelope (as Adrienne Eisen) (2001). Making Scenes. Photographs and design by Fulford. New York: Broadvision. ISBN 978-0-9703517-0-8.
- Shopsin, Kenny; Carreño, Carolynn (2008). Eat Me: The Food and Philosophy of Kenny Shopsin. Photographs by Fulford and Tamara Shopsin. Foreword by Calvin Trillin. New York: Alfred A. Knopf. ISBN 978-0-307-26493-0.
- Headley, Brooks (2014). Brooks Headley's Fancy Desserts. Photographs and design by Fulford and Tamara Shopsin. New York: W. W. Norton. ISBN 978-0-393-24107-5.
- Klacsmann, John; Lampert, Andrew (2015). Paper Airplanes: The Collections of Harry Smith, Catalogue Raisonné, Volume I. Photographs by Fulford. Atlanta/New York: J&L/Anthology Film Archives. ISBN 978-0-9895311-3-9.
- Klacsmann, John; Lampert, Andrew (2015). String Figures: The Collections of Harry Smith, Catalogue Raisonné, Volume I. Photographs by Fulford. Atlanta/New York: J&L/Anthology Film Archives. ISBN 978-0-9895311-6-0.
- Brown, Will (2016). Bruce Conner Brass Handles. Text by Jean Conner. Photographs by Fulford. Atlanta, GA: J&L. ISBN 978-0-9895311-8-4.
- Khong, Rachel (2017). All About Eggs. With the editors of Lucky Peach. Photographs and design by Fulford and Tamara Shopsin. New York: Clarkson Potter. ISBN 978-0-8041-8775-6.

== Exhibitions ==
=== Solo exhibitions ===
- New Pictures 5: Jason Fulford, The Mushroom Collection, Minneapolis Institute of Art, Minneapolis, October 2011 – April 2012. Photographs, publications, sculptures (involving the museum's permanent collection), and performances.
- Mushroom Machine, San Francisco, CA, Kadist, May 2012.
- Harry Smith's Paper Airplanes, SFO Museum, San Francisco, CA, May–August 2016.
- High Anxiety, Fraenkel Gallery, San Francisco, CA, February–March 2017.
- Fake Newsroom, Minnesota Street Project, San Francisco, CA, April 2017. With Jim Goldberg and Dru Donovan.
- Picture Summer on Kodak Film, Micamera, Milan, 2021.
- The Heart Is a Sandwich, Micamera, Milan, 2023.
- Everything (LOL), Micamera, Milan, 2025.
- Lots of Lots, Fotofestiwal, Łódź, 2025.
- So Many Windows in Time, Micamera, Milan, 2026

=== Group exhibitions or during festivals ===
- Where There's Smoke, San Francisco, Fraenkel Gallery, July–August 2014. With Ruth Van Beek, Michael Lundgren and Viviane Sassen. Curated by Darius Himes.
- Hotel Oracle, Krakow Photomonth, Krakow, Poland, 2014.
- Begin Anywhere: Paths of Mentorship and Collaboration, SF Camerawork, San Francisco, CA, September–October 2017. Collaboration between Amanda Boe, McNair Evans, Kevin Kunishi, Fulford, Todd Hido, Mark Mahaney, Mike Smith, and Alec Soth.
- The Mushroom Collection, Photo España, Madrid, 2018. Curated by Cristina De Middel.

== Awards ==
- 2014: Guggenheim Fellowship from the John Simon Guggenheim Memorial Foundation

== See also ==
- Shopsin's – a diner in New York City whose chef/owner, Kenny Shopsin, is Tamara Shopsin's father
