= Mimi Mollica =

Italian photographer, based in London (born 1975)

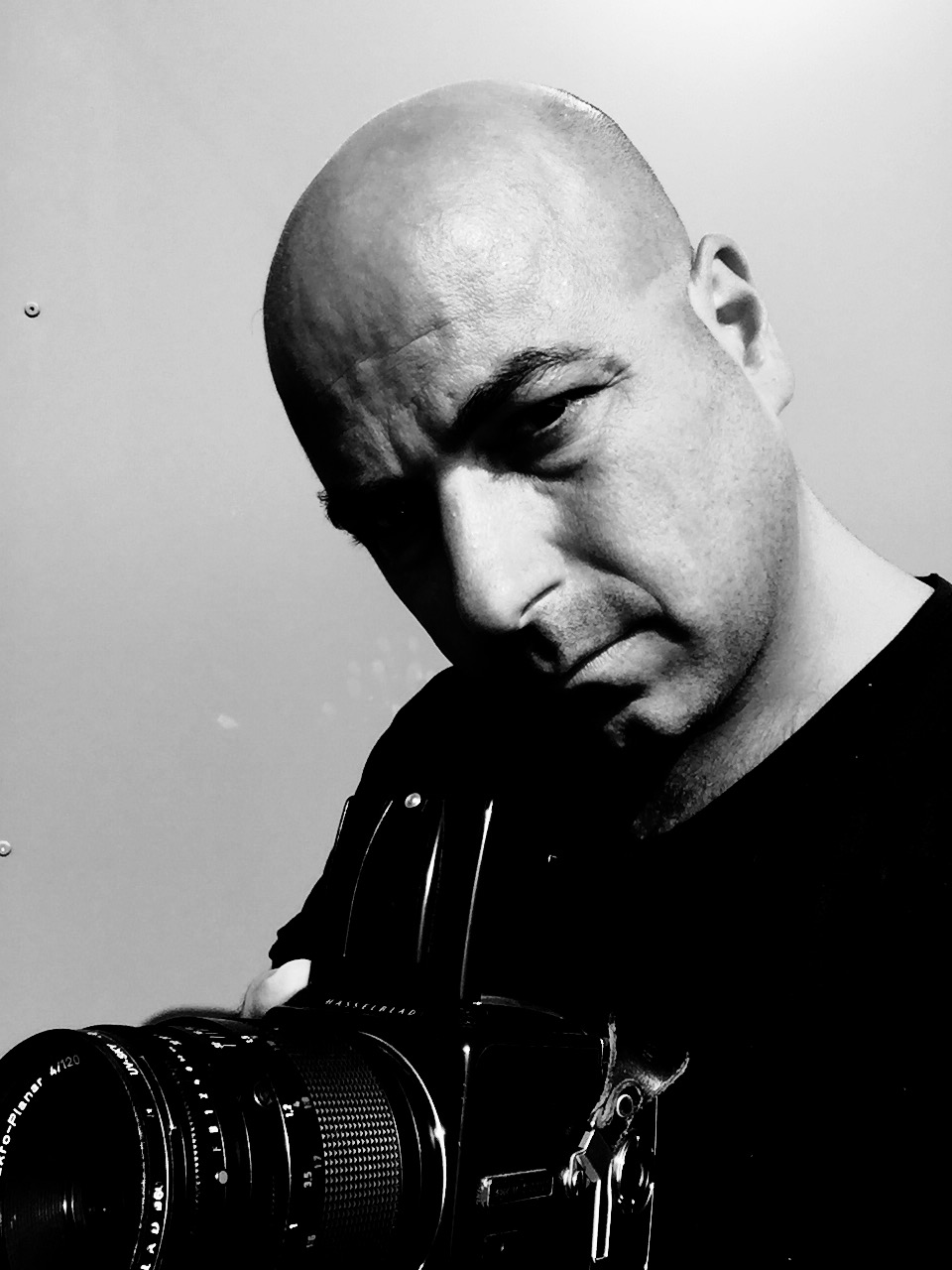
Mollica

Mimi Mollica (born 1975) is an Italian photographer, based in London. His work concerns "social issues and topics related to identity, environment, migration and macroscopic human transitions."

Mollica creates self assigned series—his book Terra Nostra (2017) is about the permanent scars left behind by the Sicilian Mafia—and works on documentary and photojournalism commissions for magazines and NGOs, and mentoring photographers. His work has also been shown in various group exhibitions and been included in survey publications on street photography.

== Life and work ==
Mollica was born and raised in Palermo, Sicily and is based in London. He began working in photography as an assistant to architectural photographer Hélène Binet. He works professionally on documentary and photojournalism commissions for magazines and NGOs. In 2015 he founded Photo Meet in London, a mentoring service for photographers.

Mollica also creates self assigned series. Over four months in 2007 and 2008 in Senegal, he photographed during the building of a road from Dakar to the new city of Diamniadio, for his series En route to Dakar. Work from this series was praised as "excellent photography" by Anita Sethi in The Independent. From 2009 he spent seven years working on his book about the permanent scars left behind by the Sicilian Mafia, Terra Nostra (2017). The book was well received by critics—Gerry Badger said its photographs "are eloquent and poetic, and in an era where so much photography is trite and shallow, dense enough to feed both mind and eye"; and Sean O'Hagan, writing in The Guardian, said "it is a work that repays close attention [...] a deft merging of the quotidian and the unsettling".

== Publications ==
=== Publications by Mollica ===
- En route to Dakar. Self-published via Blurb, 2010. (Note: En route to Dakar is described here within Blurb.com.)
- Terra Nostra. Stockport, England: Dewi Lewis, 2017. ISBN 978-1-911306-11-5. With an introduction by Roberto Scarpinato and an afterword by Sean O'Hagan. (Note: Terra Nostra is described here within the Dewi Lewis website.)

=== Publication paired with others ===
- Castelbuono: la città gentile: indagine per immagini e parole su una città e i suoi abitanti. Palermo: Passaggio, 2009. With Roberto Alajmo. ISBN 9788890370328. Italian.

=== Publications with contributions by Mollica ===
- Granta: Lost and Found. Issue 105. London: Granta, 2009. ISBN 978-1905881055. 255 pages. Edited by Alex Clark. Includes "The road," photographs from Mollica's series En route to Dakar and text by Elena Baglioni.
- Flash Forward: Emerging photographers from Canada, the United Kingdom & the United States: 2009. Toronto: The Magenta Foundation, 2009. ISBN 978-0-0721257-5-7.
- Street Photography Now. London: Thames & Hudson, 2010. ISBN 978-0-500-54393-1 (hardback). London: Thames & Hudson, 2011. ISBN 978-0-500-28907-5 (paperback). Edited by Sophie Howarth and Stephen McLaren.
- London Street Photography: 1860–2010. London: Museum of London; Stockport: Dewi Lewis, 2011. ISBN 978-1907893032. Selected from the Museum of London collection by Mike Seaborne and Anna Sparham. Published to accompany an exhibition at the Museum.
- In the Life of Cities. Zurich: Lars Müller, 2012. Edited by Mohsen Mostafavi. ISBN 9783037783023. Includes "En route to Dakar," eight photographs by Mollica.
- Street = Calle. C Photo, Vol. 9. London; Madrid, Spain; Gilly, Switzerland: Ivorypress, 2014. ISBN 9788494282003. 299 pages. Edited by Elena Ochoa Foster. Text in English and Spanish.
- The World Atlas of Street Photography. New Haven and London: Yale University Press, 2014. ISBN 978-0-300-20716-3. Edited by Jackie Higgins. With a foreword by Max Kozloff.
- Photographers' Sketchbooks. London: Thames & Hudson, 2014. ISBN 9780500544341. Edited by Stephen McLaren and Bryan Formhals.

== Awards ==
- 2005: Second prize, The Observer Photographic Hodge Award. For a story on the aftermath of the 7 July 2005 London bombings.
- 2009: Winner, European Parliament Guest Photographer.
- 2012: Finalist, Palm Springs Photo Festival Slide Show Contest, CA.
- 2012: Winner, Renaissance Photography Award, Expression Category, for Terra Nostra.
- 2013: Shortlist, Terry O'Neill TAG Award 2012, for Terra Nostra.
- 2013: Second prize, Syngenta Photography Award. For his series En route to Dakar. Mollica won funding for a photography project.
- 2014: Finalist, LensCulture Portrait Award, for a photograph from Terra Nostra.

== Group exhibitions ==
- 2010: This Must be the Place, Jerwood Space, London, November–December 2010. With photographs by Mollica, David Campany, Camille Fallet, Xavier Ribas, Eva Stenram, Lillian Wilkie, and Tereza Zelenkova.
- 2010: Street Photography Now, Third Floor Gallery, Cardiff, October–November 2010, and toured to Contributed Studio for the Arts, Berlin, December 2010 – January 2011; Museum of Printing, Historical Museum of Warsaw, Warsaw, November 2011 – January 2012. Photographs from the book Street Photography Now (2011) by Mollica and others
- 2010: This Must Be the Place, Jerwood Space, London, November – December 2010. With work by Tereza Zelenkova, Camille Fallet, Xavier Ribas, Walker Evans, Eva Stenram, Lillian Wilkie and Mollica. Curated by David Campany.
- 2013: Rural–Urban: The Syngenta Photography Award Exhibition, Somerset House, London, May 2013.
- 2014: Terry O’Neill Awards 2013, The Strand Gallery, London, January 2014.
