= Bauble =

A bauble may be:

- Memorabilia
- Christmas ornament - British English
- trinket
- knickknack or Bric-à-brac
- frippery
- gewgaw
- tchotchke
- small jewelry
