= Guido Guidi (photographer) =

Italian photographer (born 1941)

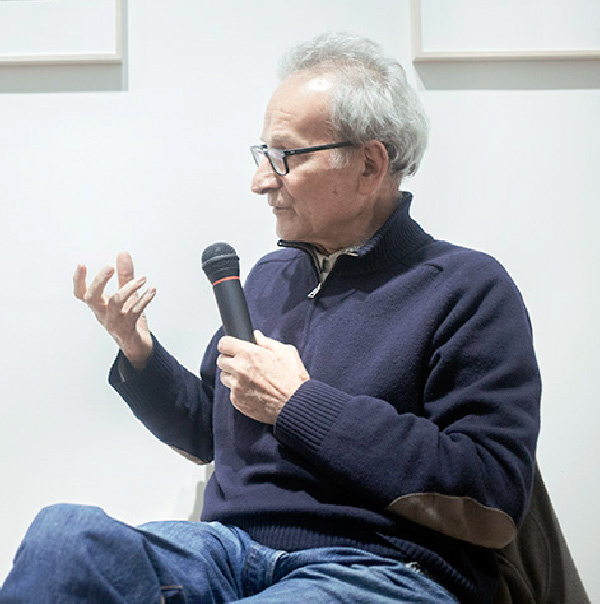
- Guido Guidi in 2015
- Born: December 26, 1940 (age 85); Cesena, Italy
- Notable work: Varianti (1995); A New Map of Italy (2011); Per Strada (2018)

Guido Guidi (born December 26, 1940) is an Italian photographer. His work, spanning over more than 40 years, has focused in particular on rural and suburban geographies in Italy and Europe. He photographs places that are normally overlooked. His published works include In Between Cities, Guardando a Est, A New Map of Italy and Veramente.

== Life and work ==
Guidi was born in Cesena, Italy. He enrolled in 1959 at IUAV and then at the School of Advanced Studies in Industrial Design in Venice. He followed, among other courses, the ones offered by Bruno Zevi, Carlo Scarpa, Luigi Veronesi, and Italo Zannier.

He started taking pictures in 1956 and continuously in 1966. Since 1989 he has taught Photography at Accademia di Belle Arti in Ravenna and he is part of the scientific committee for the project "Linea di Confine" (Rubiera, RE). Since 2001 he has taught at the IUAV Design e Art faculty in Venice.

His later publications include Per Strada; A New Map of Italy; and Carlo Scarpa's Tomba Brion. He has shown his work at the Guggenheim and Whitney museums in New York, at Centre Pompidou in Paris, at the Venice Biennial and at Canadian Centre for Architecture in Montréal. His work is held in the collections of the Centre Pompidou in Paris, of the Canadian Centre for Architecture in Montréal, of the San Francisco Museum of Modern Art, and of the Musée d'Art moderne de la Ville de Paris.

Guidi began experimenting in the late 1960s with pseudo-documentary images that interrogated photography's objectivity. Influenced by neorealist film and conceptual art, in the 1970s he began investigating Italy's man-altered landscape. Working in marginal and decayed spaces with an 8×10 large format camera, he creates dense sequences intended as meditations on the meaning of landscape, photography, and seeing. Later he investigated the life and death of modernist architecture, with projects on Scarpa, van der Rohe, and Le Corbusier. Photography for Guidi is something autobiographical. It is synonymous with inhabiting, and the camera is the instrument that allows him to observe, appropriate and collect what lies beyond his doorstep.

"Guidi was a leading voice in the resurgence of Italian photography of the 1970s and 1980s". "Since then, working mostly in colour with a large-format camera, he has patiently returned to the same places – his native Romagna and the area around Venice – documenting the shift from a rural to a post-industrial landscape."

== Publications ==
=== Publications by Guidi ===
- Guido Guidi (Galleria dell'immagine, Rimini 1983)
- Laboratorio di fotografia 1 (Linea di Confine, Rubiera 1989)
- Rimini Nord (Musei comunali, Rimini 1992)
- Varianti (Art&, Udine 1995) ISBN 9788886550123
- Carlo Scarpa, Architect: Intervening with History, edited by Nicholas Olsberg (CCA / Monacelli, New York 1999) ISBN 9780920785614
- SS9. Itinerari lungo la via Emilia (Linea di Confine, Rubiera 2000)
- Mies in America, edited by Phyllis Lambert (CCA / Whitney Museum of American Art, New York 2001)
- Strada ovest 04.02 (Linea di Confine, Rubiera 2002)
- In Between Cities. Un itinerario attraverso l’Europa 1993/1996. (Electa, Milano 2003). Edited by Marco Venturi and Antonello Frongia. With texts in Italian and English by Louise Désy, Antonello Frongia, Roberta Valtorta and Marco Venturi.
- Le Corbusier, Scritti, a cura di Rosa Tamborrino (Einaudi, Milano 2003)
- Rubiera: Linea di Confine, 2003.
- Atri 05.03 (Linea di Confine, Rubiera 2003)
- Guido Guidi. 19692004 (San Fedele Arte, Milano 2004)
- Guido Guidi. PK TAV 139+500 (Linea di Confine, Rubiera 2006)
- Bunker. Along the atlantic wall (Electa, Milano 2006)
- Vol. I, Guido Guidi e Vitaliano Trevisan (Electa, Milano 2006)
- Due Giorni, Cavallino-Treporti (Cavallino-Treporti Fotografie 2010)
- A New Map of Italy. (Loosestrife Editions, Washington 2011). ISBN 0-9753120-4-9. With texts by Gerry Badger and Marlene Klein. Edition of 1500 copies.
- Fiume (Fantombooks, Milano 2010)
- Carlo Scarpa: Brion. (Hatje Cantz, Ostfildern 2011). Edited by Antonello Frongia. With a text by Guidi and an essay by Frongia. ISBN 978-3775726245.
- La figura dell’Orante. Appunti per una lezione (Edizioni del bradipo, Lugo 2012) ISBN 8890644958
- A Seneghe, Mariangela Gualtieri e Guido Guidi (Perda Sonadora Imprentas, Seneghe 2012)
- Cinque paesaggi, 1983–1993 (Postcart / ICCD, Roma 2013) ISBN 9788890507229
- Preganziol 1983 (Mack, London 2013) ISBN 9781907946578.
- Monte Grappa 1985–1988 (Osservatorio Fotografico, Ravenna 2014).
- Veramente. London: Mack, 2014. ISBN 9781907946608. Text by Marta Dahó.
- Guardando a Est / Looking East (Walther König, Köln / Linea di Confine, Rubiera 2015) ISBN 978-88-88382-22-7.
- Verum Ipsum. (Skinnerboox, 2017). Edition of 800 copies.
- Appuntamento a Firenze (Walther König, Köln 2018) ISBN 978-3-96098-280-7.
- Le Corbusier – 5 Architectures (Kehrer Verlag, Heidelberg 2018) ISBN 978-3-86828-833-9.
- Annual Series 6, Book 1. Guidi, Gregory Halpern, Jason Fulford, and Viviane Sassen each had one book in a set of four. Edition of 1000 copies.
- Dietro Casa. Oakland, CA: TBW Books, 2018. ISBN 978-1-942953-33-3.
- Per Strada. London: Mack, 2018. ISBN 978-1-912339-17-4.
- Lunario, 1968-1999. London: Mack, 2020. ISBN 978-1-912339-67-9.
- Tra l'altro, 1976-81. London: Mack, 2020. Selected from Guidi's archive by Marcello Galvani. ISBN 978-1-912339-85-3. English and Italian text.
- Cinque viaggi (1990-98). London: Mack, 2021. ISBN 978-1-913620-32-5.
- Di sguincio, 1969-81. London: Mack, 2023. ISBN 978-1-915743-01-5.

=== Publications with others ===
- Due Fotografi per il Teatro Bonci. 1983. With Luigi Ghirri. Edited by Guidi.
- Verso Nord. Stuttgart: Hartmann, 2022. With Gerry Johansson. Edited by Stefania Rössl and Massimo Sordi. ISBN 978-3-96070-080-7. With text, Rössl in conversation with Guidi and Johansson. Two volumes. In Italian and English. Photographs made around Castelfranco Veneto, Italy.

== Exhibitions ==
=== Solo exhibitions ===
- Carlo Scarpa's Tomba Brion: Photographs by Guido Guidi, 1997–2007, Canadian Centre for Architecture, 2009/10. Works by Guidi.

=== Exhibitions with contributions by Guidi ===
- Carlo Scarpa, Architect: Intervening with History, Canadian Centre for Architecture, 1999. An exhibition of Scarpa's work, with new photographs commissioned by the CCA from Guidi regarding Scarpa's projects.

=== Group exhibitions ===
- Arrivals, Canadian Centre for Architecture, 2008. Works by Dieter Appelt, Robert Burley, Edward Burtynsky, Giovanni Chiaramonte, Thomas Florschuetz, John Gossage, Guidi, Gordon Matta-Clark, Alain Paiement, Irene Whittome, Richard Henriquez, Philippe Lupien, Jacques Rousseau, and Tadao Ando.
- 32 Italian Photographers: A Tribute to Phyllis Lambert, Canadian Centre for Architecture, 1999. Works by Andrea Abati, Cesare Ballardini, Marina Ballo Charmet, Olivo Barbieri, Gabriele Basilico, Nunzio Battaglia, Giannantonio Battistella, Roberto Bossaglia, Luca Campigotto, Vincenzo Castella, Alessandra Chemollo, Giovanni Chiaramonte, Mario Cresci, Paola de Pietri, Vittore Fossati, Moreno Gentili, Luigi Ghirri, Paolo Gioli, William Guerrieri, Guidi, Mimmo Jodice, Martino Marangoni, Walter Niedermayr, Fulvio Orsenigo, Francesco Radino, Gloria Salvatori, George Tatge, Franco Vaccari, Fulvio Ventura, Silvio Wolf, Giovanni Zaffagnini, and Marco Zanta.
- Photography and Transformations of the Contemporary City: Venezia – Marghera, Canadian Centre for Architecture, 1999. Works by Marina Ballo Charmet, Olivo Barbieri, Gabriele Basilico, Gianantonio Battistella, Luca Campigotto, Vincenzo Castella, Alessandra Chemollo, Giovanni Chiaramonte, Paola De Pietri, William Guerrieri, Guidi, Mimmo Jodice, Walter Niedermayr, Fulvio Orsenigo, and Marco Zanta.
- Ways of Seeing: Cesare Fabbri, Peter Fraser, Marcello Galvani, Guidi, Large Glass, Photo London, 2017. Works by Guidi, Peter Fraser, Cesare Fabbri and Marcello Galvani.
