= Aaron Schuman =

American photographer, writer, curator and educator (born 1977)

Aaron Schuman (born 1977) is an American photographer, writer, curator and educator based in the United Kingdom. His books of photography include Folk (2016), Slant (2019) and Sonata (2022).

== Life and work ==
=== Early life and education ===
Aaron Schuman was born and raised in Northampton, Massachusetts. He attended Northfield Mount Hermon School, and received a BFA in Photography and History of Art from New York University Tisch School of the Arts in 1999, and an MA in Humanities and Cultural Studies from the London Consortium at Birkbeck, University of London in 2003.

=== Sonata ===
Sonata (2022)—published by Mack—draws inspiration from Johann Wolfgang von Goethe's Italian Journey (1786–1788). Over the course of four years (2019-2022), Schuman pursued and studied what Goethe described as "sense-impressions", reiterating many of the introspective questions that Goethe asked himself during his own travels through Italy: "In putting my powers of observation to the test, I have found a new interest in life...Can I learn to look at things with clear, fresh eyes? How much can I take in at a single glance? Can the grooves of old mental habits be effaced?" Using the classical sonata form – three movements moving through exposition, development, and recapitulation — as a guide, Schuman invites the reader to explore an Italy as much of the mind as of the world: one soaked in the euphoria and terror, harmony and dissonance of its cultural and historical legacies, and yet constantly new, invigorating, and resonant in its sensorial and psychological suggestions. As Adam Ryan wrote:

"[T]he photographs convey a sense of remarkable determination [...] Schuman's photographs feel like they spring from the mind of someone straddling the perspectives of a local and a complete stranger. Time and again, he successfully places himself somewhere in the middle. This liminal quality can be detected on many conceptual levels, not just in the sense of cultural familiarity [...] Schuman walks the line between euphoria and dread, lust and death, triumph and decline, joy and tedium, tenderness and indifference."

=== Slant ===
Slant (2019)—published by Mack—interweaves a collection of police reports published in a small-town newspaper, The Amherst Bulletin, between 2014 and 2018, with quietly wry photographs Schuman made in and around Amherst, Massachusetts at the same time. Schuman's subtly offbeat combination of images and words is both humorous and also inclined to create a foreboding sense of unease. In Slant, the relationship that has been constructed between photography and text takes its inspiration from slant rhyme, notably espoused by the 19th-century poet Emily Dickinson, who also lived and wrote in Amherst. Appropriating this literary device, Slant serves as a wider reflection upon something strange, surreal, dissonant and increasingly sinister stirring beneath the surface of the contemporary American landscape, experience, and psyche. The writer, curator and photographic historian David Campany wrote:

"Schuman's project proposes a set of relations without having to formalize or resolve them. In this way, whatever else it may be 'about', Slant is about its own form, about its own proposition, about its not adding up, and what that not adding up might open onto for an engaged viewer/reader [...] Slant is a matter of accepting that truth must be pursued while knowing that its form cannot be presumed. It has to be fought for, and fought over, speculated, experimented, hypothesized, wrestled with, and offered sincerely, while knowing that it is always going to be partial and provisional."

=== Folk ===
Folk (2016)—published by NB Books—explores the Ethnographic Museum of Kraków, its collections and exhibits, as well as its own distinct customs and culture, via Schuman's own personal history. In one sense, the book focuses specifically on the regional and cultural heritage of Schuman's forefathers, but equally considers the ways in which this heritage has been collected, preserved, archived, documented and represented via the field of ethnography, and within the Ethnographic Museum in " itself. Bringing together Schuman's own photographs of the museum and images from its vast archive, Folk is an examination of the Ethnographic Museum's own traditions, history, archives, artefacts and practices over the course of the last century, and represents a story of curiosity, self-discovery and the forging of both history and memory. Personal narrative is interwoven with preservation and documentation, as Schuman embraces the museum's stated mission of being a "centre of reflection and understanding, of both ourselves and others".

=== Contributions to publications ===
Schuman has contributed written work and photographs to journals, magazines, platforms and publications including Aperture, Frieze, TIME, Magnum Photos, the British Journal of Photography, and The Financial Times.

In 2004, Schuman founded the online photography journal SeeSaw Magazine, which he edited and published until 2014. The magazine featured portfolios and interviews with photographers, artists and curators.

=== Curator ===
In 2010, Schuman served as a Guest Curator for FotoFest. His exhibition, "Whatever Was Splendid: New American Photographs", explored the legacy of Walker Evans's American Photographs (1938) within contemporary photography, and Evans' contributions to the nation's photographic traditions, as well as to the practice of photography in the United States today. It focused on how Evans' influence continues to develop, adapt, propagate, and flourish in the twenty-first century.

In 2014, Schuman was invited to be Curator of Krakow Photomonth festival. Entitled Re:Search, his exhibition programme focused on the relationship between photography and the search for knowledge, investigated the roles that photography often plays within the search for knowledge, and celebrated photography as a unique form of study, inquiry, investigation, intensive searching, and research in its own right.

In 2016, Schuman curated Indivisible: New American Documents at Fotomuseum Antwerp (FOMU). The exhibition highlighted how various aspects of contemporary American culture, which are often presented as diametrically opposed to one another—prosperity and poverty, masculinity and femininity, innocence and violence, fantasy and reality – collide and coexist; how they are in fact intricately linked, integral to one another, and profoundly indivisible.

In 2018, Schuman was invited to be Co-Curator of JaipurPhoto Festival, which featured twelve open-air exhibitions at UNESCO World Heritage Sites throughout the city of Jaipur, India. The exhibition programme, Homeward Bound, considered various ways in which a variety of contemporary photographers explore, express, engage with and examine notions of "home", and how one's idea of "home" is both determined and defined by oneself and others.

In 2021, Schuman was commissioned by the Royal Photographic Society to curate the exhibition, In Progress, which presented solo shows by five photographers and contemporary photo-based artists. The exhibition featured new works alongside work-in-progress, and explored personal history, cultural identity, nationality, community, migration, displacement, responsibility, belief, morality, and memory. It highlighted the diverse possibilities that photography offers in terms of research, investigation, critique, and self-expression, in the pursuit of both artistic and social progress. In Progress featured Laia Abril, Hoda Afshar, Widline Cadet, Adama Jalloh, and Alba Zari.

=== Teaching ===
Schuman is Associate Professor of Photography and Visual Culture, and the founder and Programme Leader of the MA in Photography programme, at the University of the West of England, Bristol.

== Publications ==
- Folk (2016)
- Slant (2019)
- Sonata (2022)

== Exhibitions ==
- Foam (Fotografiemuseum Amsterdam)
- Format International Photography Festival

== Collections ==
Schuman's work is held in the following permanent collection:

- Museum of Fine Arts, Houston, Texas: 1 print (as of 14 December 2022)

== Awards ==
- Foam Talent, 2009
- Finalist for the Hariban Award, 2021
