= David Campany =

British writer, curator, photographer and educator

David Campany (born 8 October 1967) is a British writer, curator, artist and educator, working mainly with photography. He has written and edited books; contributed essays and reviews to other books, journals, magazines and websites; curated photography exhibitions; given public lectures, talks and conference papers; had exhibitions of his own work; and been a jury member for photography awards. He has taught photographic theory and practice at the University of Westminster, London. Campany is Managing Director of Programs at the International Center of Photography in New York City.

His books have won the Kraszna-Krausz Foundation Book Award, Infinity Award from the International Center of Photography, Silver Award from Deutscher Fotobuchpreis and the J Dudley Johnston Award from the Royal Photographic Society.

Campany is co-founder and co-editor of PA magazine.

== Early life and education ==
Campany grew up in Essex. He gained a degree in film, video and photographic arts from the Polytechnic of Central London and an MA in photographic studies from the same school, by then renamed University of Westminster.

== Life and work ==
In the 1990s Campany taught histories of art and graphic design at Winchester School of Art. From 2000 to 2004 he taught photographic theory and practice at Surrey Institute of Art and Design. He became a reader in photography at the University of Westminster in 2004.

Campany's book Gasoline (2013) consists of photographs of prints of petrol stations from 1945 to 1995 rescued from archives of several American newspapers that have been discarding their analogue print collections in favour of digital storage, and edited into a visual meta-narrative. Most of the photographs have been marked by the grease pencil of a newspaper's art director, outlining the crop required to illustrate a particular story, or stories, in the newspaper. They are often heavily retouched by hand, painting selectively over the image with white-out and pen. The second half of the book consists of pictures of the reverse of the prints, showing caption information, the name of the photographer and copyright holder, dates of publication, the newspaper, and sometimes clippings from the image's use in the paper, an archive of its own use which is lost in a digital archive. As well as being "elevated to icon in the visual language of 'America'", gas stations "are quite banal but when they make news it's because there's been a crime, an accident, a price rise or a geopolitical crisis" which "makes the gas station a revealing measure of a society over the second half of the 20th century". The book describes "America's relationship with the car, with travel, with consumption, with the rest of the world" and can also be read as "an allegory about news photography. Or a minor history of car design, or vernacular architecture, or street graphics, or outfits worn by pump attendants. All of the above."

Walker Evans: the Magazine Work (2014), edited and with "an exhaustive essay" by Campany, explores the period of Evans's photographic career at Fortune and other magazines, a period that has gone largely unnoticed, with Evans "lauded for every part of his creative career except for his magazine work." Krystal Grow, writing in Time, praised Campany's book as "Exhaustively researched and meticulously edited".

In The Open Road: Photography & the American Road Trip (2014) Campany introduces the road trip as a photographic genre, the first book to do so. It includes writing by Campany and photographs by Robert Frank (from The Americans), Ed Ruscha, Inge Morath (from The Road to Reno), Garry Winogrand, William Eggleston, Lee Friedlander, Joel Meyerowitz, Jacob Holdt (from American Pictures), Stephen Shore, Bernard Plossu, Victor Burgin (from US 77), Joel Sternfeld, Shin'ya Fujiwara, Alec Soth (from Sleeping by the Mississippi), Todd Hido, Ryan McGinley, Justine Kurland, and Taiyo Onorato and Nico Krebs (from The Great Unreal).

Campany co-founded and co-edits PA magazine with Cristina Bechtler. Published since 2008, in each issue an artist is invited to select and sequence their own work and select a second artist who does the same, possibly with a dialogue about their practice.

As of March 2020 he was Managing Director of Programs at the International Center of Photography in New York City.

== Personal life ==
As of October 2013 he lived in north London with his wife, Polly Braden, and two daughters. The couple have since split up and Braden is a single parent.

== Publications ==
=== Books of work by Campany ===
- Art and Photography. London: Phaidon. Edited and with text by Campany.
  - Art and Photography. 2003. ISBN 9780714842868. "Early editions (blue Thomas Struth cover) includes an extensive 'Documents' section, cut from the later, cheaper re-editions (Luigi Ghirri cover)."
  - Art and Photography. Themes & Movements. Reprinted 2005, 2008, 2012. English (ISBN 978-0714863924), French, Spanish, German, Italian and Japanese editions. Paperback and hardback.
- The Cinematic. Documents of Contemporary Art series. London: Whitechapel Gallery; Cambridge, MA: MIT Press, 2007. ISBN 978-085488-152-9. Edited by Campany and with contributions from Roland Barthes, Jean Baudrillard, Raymond Bellour, Anton Giulio Bragaglia, Victor Burgin, Henri Cartier-Bresson, Catherine David, Thierry de Duve, Gilles Deleuze, Philip-Lorca diCorcia, Philippe Dubois, Régis Durand, Sergei Eisenstein, Mike Figgis, Hollis Frampton, Susanne Gaensheimer, Nan Goldin, Chris Marker, Christian Metz, Laura Mulvey, László Moholy-Nagy, Beaumont Newhall, Uriel Orlow, Pier Paolo Pasolini, Constance Penley, Richard Prince, Steve Reich, Carlo Rim, Raul Ruiz, Susan Sontag, Blake Stimson, Michael Tarantino, Agnès Varda, Jeff Wall, Andy Warhol, and Peter Wollen.
- Hannah Collins: Current History. Films and Photographs. Barcelona: La Caixa Foundation, 2008. Exhibition catalogue, edited and with text by Campany and CaixaForum Barcelona.
  - Hannah Collins. Història en curso: Películas y Fotografías. Spanish-language edition also with English text. ISBN 9788476649879.
  - Història en curs : Pel·lícules i Fotografies. Catalan-language edition also with English text. ISBN 9788476649862.
- Photography and Cinema. Edited and with text by Campany.
  - London: Reaktion, 2008. ISBN 9781861893512.
  - צילום, קולנוע, צילום. Tel Aviv: Pitom Publishing, 2011. Hebrew-language edition, translated by Esther Dotan.
  - Sinema ve Fotoğrafçılık. Tehran: Iran Book News Agency (IBNA), 2013. Iranian-language edition, translated by Muhsin Bayramnejad’ın.
- Hannah Collins: la Revelación del Tiempo (Time Will Explain it All). Bogotá: Museo de Arte de la Universidad Nacional de Colombia / National University's Art Museum, National University of Colombia, 2010. Exhibition catalogue, edited and with text by Campany.
- Jeff Wall: Picture for Women. London: Afterall; Cambridge, MA: MIT Press, 2011. ISBN 978-1-84638-071-6. Edited and with text by Campany.
- Rich and Strange. Chopped Liver, 2012. ASIN B00L2FP92Q. Edited and with text by Campany. Edition of 100 copies.
- Gasoline. Edited by Campany. Includes transcript of an interview with George Kaplan.
  - London: Mack, 2013. ISBN 9781907946448.
  - London: MAPP. E-book.
- Walker Evans: the Magazine Work. Göttingen: Steidl, 2014. ISBN 978-3-86930-259-1. Photographs by Walker Evans, edited and with an essay by Campany.
- The Open Road: Photography & the American Road Trip. Edited and with text by Campany, photographs by Robert Frank, Ed Ruscha, Inge Morath, Garry Winogrand, William Egglestone, Lee Friedlander, Joel Meyerowitz, Jacob Holdt, Stephen Shore, Bernard Plossu, Victor Burgin, Joel Sternfeld, Shin'ya Fujiwara, Alec Soth, Todd Hido, Ryan McGinley, Justine Kurland, and Taiyo Onorato and Nico Krebs.
  - New York: Aperture, 2014. ISBN 978-1-59711-240-6.
  - Road Trips: Voyages photographiques à travers l’Amérique. Paris: Textuel, 2014. ISBN 9782845975002. French-language version.
  - En la Carretera: Viajes fotográficos a través de Norteamérica. Madrid: La Fábrica, 2014. ISBN 9788415691822. Spanish-language version.
- A Handful of Dust. London: Mack; Paris: Le Bal, 2015. ISBN 9781910164389. English-language version. Accompanied by an exhibition at Le Bal, Paris.
  - Dust: Histoires de poussière: D'après Man Ray et Marcel Duchamp. London: Mack; Paris: Le Bal, 2015. ISBN 978-1910164488. French-language version.
- On Photographs. London: Thames & Hudson; Cambridge, MA: MIT Press; Turin, Italy: Giulio Einaudi, 2020. Edited and with text by Campany.
- Jeff Wall Photographs. Allemandi, 2025. Written and edited by Campany. Book published to accompany an exhibition at Gallerie d’Italia, Turin October 9, 2025 – February 1, 2026. ISBN 9788842227403

=== Books with one other ===
- Adventures in the Lea Valley. East London Photo Stories: Book 12. Hoxton Mini, 2016. With Polly Braden. ISBN 978-1-910566-12-1.

=== Books with contributions by Campany ===
- Stillness and Time: Photography and the Moving Image. Brighton: Photoworks, 2006. ISBN 9781903796184. Edited and with chapters by Joanna Lowry and David Green. Campany contributes the chapter "Posing, acting, photography". Chapters also by Mary Ann Doane, Jonathan Friday, Yve Lomax, Kaja Silverman, John Stezaker, Garrett Stewart, Laura Mulvey and Victor Burgin.
- Making History: Art and Documentary from 1929 to Now. London: Tate Publishing, 2006. ISBN 978-1854376824. Edited by Campany, Lynda Morris, Mark Nash and Tanya Barson. Includes essays, and illustrated by John Grierson, William Coldstream, Humphrey Spender, Bill Brandt, John Bratby, Lucian Freud, Martin Parr, Isaac Julien, Jeremy Deller and Gillian Wearing. Catalogue of an exhibition by the same name at Tate Liverpool, 2006.
- Jeff Wall speaks with David Campany. Conversations with Photographers. Madrid: La Fábrica, 2009. ISBN 9788492498895. Comes in a box of five other book-length conversations, the others being John Baldessari, Hannah Collins, Axel Hütte, Gonzalo Puch and Wolfgang Tillmans). English and Spanish editions. This edition's text is reprinted in Jeff Wall: Visibility, Tel Aviv Museum of Art, 2013, ISBN 978-965-539-078-0, Hebrew/English.
- William Klein: Paintings, Etc. Rome: Contrasto; London: Hackelbury; New York: Howard Greenberg, 2012. ISBN 9788869654008. Campany contributes an essay, "Ninety Seconds". (Note: A copy of Campany's essay is available here within the Hackelbury website)

==== PA magazine ====
- Jeff Wall & Patrick Faigenbaum. PA magazine no. 1. London, Zurich, New York: Ink Tree, 2008. ISSN 1662-7660. Work by Jeff Wall and Patrick Faigenbaum. Campany contributes an essay. Includes a conversation between Wall and Faigenbaum, and also essays by Mark Bolland and Georg Kohler
- Doug Aitken & Philip Hays. PA magazine no. 2. London, Zurich, New York: Ink Tree, 2009. ISSN 1662-7660. Photographs by Doug Aitken and illustration by Philip Hays. Campany contributes a text, as do Aitken, Philip Kaiser and Mark Wigley.
- John Baldessari & Naomi Shohan. PA magazine no. 3. London, Zurich, New York: Ink Tree, 2011. ISBN 9783037642528. Collages by John Baldessari and photographs by Naomi Shohan. Co-edited by Campany and Cristina Bechtler. Campany contributes a series of quotations by various people about editing. Text by Jessica Morgan and an email conversation with Baldessari, Shohan and Amy Cappellazzo.
- Boris Mikhailov & Tacita Dean. PA magazine no. 4. London, Zurich, New York: Ink Tree, 2013. ISSN 1662-7660. Work by Boris Mikhailov. Campany and Cristina Bechtler contribute an introduction. Texts by Tacita Dean, Amy Cappellazzo and Philip Ursprung.

== Awards ==
- 2009: And/or Book Awards / Kraszna-Krausz Foundation Book Awards, Moving Image category, for Photography and Cinema (2008).
- 2012: Infinity Award, writing category, from the International Center of Photography, for Jeff Wall: Picture for Women (2011).
- 2015: Silver Award, Deutscher Fotobuchpreis, for Walker Evans: the Magazine Work (2014).
- 2015: J Dudley Johnston Award, Royal Photographic Society.

== Exhibitions ==
=== Exhibitions curated by Campany ===
- 2008: Hannah Collins: Current History, CaixaForum Barcelona, 23 October – 11 January 2009; CaixaForum Madrid, 19 November – 21 February 2010; Artium Museum, Vitoria-Gasteiz, 23 October 2008 – 11 January 2009; National University's Art Museum, University City of Bogotá, National University of Colombia, Bogotá (where it was expanded and retitled La Revelación del Tiempo, co-curated with Maria Belén Saez de Ibarra). Films and photographs by Hannah Collins.
- 2010: Anonymes: Unnamed America in Photography and Film, Le Bal, Paris, 18 September – 19 December 2010. A thematic exhibition with works by Jeff Wall, Walker Evans, Chauncey Hare, Lewis Baltz, Standish Lawder, Sharon Lockhart, Doug Rickard, Anthony Hernandez, Arianna Arcara & Luca Santese, and Bruce Gilden.
- 2010: This Must Be the Place, Jerwood Space, London, 17 November – 12 December 2010. With work by Tereza Zelenkova, Camille Fallet, Xavier Ribas, Walker Evans, Eva Stenram, Lillian Wilkie and Mimi Mollica.
- 2013: Mark Neville, Deeds Not Words, The Photographers' Gallery, London, 2 August – 29 September 2013. Photographs by Mark Neville.
- 2013: Victor Burgin: On Paper, Richard Saltoun Gallery, 2013. With work by Victor Burgin.
- 2013: Victor Burgin: A Sense of Place, London, Ambika P3, 2013, 1 November – 1 December 2013. With work by Victor Burgin.
- 2014: Lewis Baltz – Common Objects: Hitchcock, Antonioni, Godard, Le Bal, Paris, 23 May – 24 August 2014. Photographs by Lewis Baltz.
- 2014/2015: Walker Evans: the Magazine Work, Museum of Contemporary Art in Kraków (MOCAK), 16 May 2014 – 15 June 2014; Fotomuseum Antwerp, 27 June – 12 November 2014. Pôle Image Haute-Normandie, Rouen, France, 13 March – 9 May 2015. Photographs by Walker Evans.
- 2015–2017: A Handful of Dust – From the Cosmic to the Domestic, Le Bal, Paris, 16 October 2015 – 17 January 2016; A Handful of Dust: Photography after Man Ray and Marcel Duchamp, Whitechapel Gallery, London, June–September 2017
- 2016: The Open Road: Photography and the American Road Trip, Crystal Bridges Museum of American Art, Bentonville, AR, February–May 2016. Curated by Campany and Denise Wolff.

=== Exhibitions by Campany as artist ===
==== Solo exhibitions ====
- 1996: Documents of the Impossible. Focal Point Gallery, Southend, Essex. June–August 1996.

==== Exhibitions with others ====
- 2009: Broken Pieces of China, made in collaboration with Polly Braden, London Gallery West, University of Westminster, 6 February – 1 March 2009.
- 2011: Lee Cluderay, made in collaboration with Polly Braden, Szara Kamienica Gallery, 14 May – 12 June 2011, as part of Kracow Photomonth, curated by Adam Broomberg & Oliver Chanarin.
- 2011: Adventures in the Valley, made in collaboration with Polly Braden, Minnie Weisz Studio, 1–17 July 2011, as part of London Street Photography Festival.

==== Group exhibitions ====
- 2005: Adventures in the Valley, made in collaboration with Polly Braden, Institute of Contemporary Arts, London, August 2005, as part of Real Estate, curated by B+B. Digital slideshow and photographic prints.
- 2010: Nothing is in the Place, 1–30 May 2010, Gallery of Contemporary Art Bunkier Sztuki, curated by Jason Evans as part of Kracow Photomonth.

== Television appearances ==
- The Genius of Photography. Six-part series by Wall-to-Wall Productions, BBC Television, 2007.
- The Many Lives of William Klein. Imagine series, BBC1, first broadcast 20 November 2012.
