= Chad States =

American photographer and artist

Chad States (born 1975) is an American photographer and artist, living in Philadelphia, Pennsylvania. His photographic series include Cruising and Masculinities.

== Early life and education ==
States was born in Edmonds, Washington. He holds a BA from Evergreen State College and an MFA from Tyler School of Art and Architecture.

== Life and work ==
States lives in Philadelphia, Pennsylvania, where he is a member of the Vox Populi artist collective. In 2009 we was an artist-in-residence at Light Work in Syracuse, New York.

His work is concerned with questions of masculinity and vulnerability, specifically pursued in a landscape of queer sex and desire.

Cruising (2011) is a book of photographs of men cruising for sex outdoors in parks. "The subjects are anonymous, often appearing only partially, obscured by vegetation or shadows", and only a small part of the picture among the lush forestry of their surroundings. Having initially worked solely with photography, since 2012/13 States has also worked with other mediums.

For his Masculinities series, States placed an ad on Craigslist seeking anyone who identified as being masculine. His subjects were mostly cisgendered men, but also included a few trans men, and women. He "met the subjects at their homes, where he photographed them in poses and scenarios they themselves dictated." The "variety proves how impossible it is to fit masculinity into one box or to define it simply. Each person States photographs crafts their own idea of masculinity". Accompanying each portrait is a quote describing what it means to them to be manly.

States has said:

"I'm a big fan of [Katy Grannan]. Her work feels very cruel and very tender at the same time and I love that idea of exploitation, of power dynamics. It makes the images exciting. I try to make work that creates a discussion about exploitation. I find the idea of, "How much am I exploiting the subject here?" very interesting."

== Publications ==
=== Publications by States ===
- Cruising. Brooklyn: powerHouse, 2011. With texts by Gordon Brent Ingram and Alec Soth. ISBN 978-1-57687-583-4.
- Trade. First edition. Philadelphia: self-published, 2012. Loose-leaf collection of photographs. Edition of 40 copies.
- Trade. Summer Edition / second edition. Philadelphia: self-published, 2012. Loose-leaf collection of photographs. Edition of 40 copies.
- Trade. Winter Edition. Philadelphia: self-published, 2013. Loose-leaf collection of photographs. Edition of 40 copies.

=== Publications with contributions by States ===
- Alec Soth's Lonely Boy Mag. Issue 2: Boys and Their Cars. St. Paul, MN: Little Brown Mushroom, 2011. Text and photographs by States (Give or Take), Alec Soth (The Most Beautiful Woman in Georgia) and Todd Hido (Suburban Souls), and erotic dioramas by Peter Davidson. Edition of 1000 copies.

== Group exhibitions ==
- Into the Woods, ClampArt, New York City, 2012. Included work from Cruising.
- Blue Sky Gallery, Portland, Oregon, 2014. Included work from Cruising.

== Collections ==
States' work is held in the following permanent collection:

- Jule Collins Smith Museum of Fine Art, Auburn University, Auburn, Alabama: 1 print (as of May 2021)
