= Rowan Mersh =

English sculptor

Rowan Mersh (1982) is an English multimedia sculptor, known for freestanding sculptures and large-scale wall pieces made of thousands of components of various materials engaged to create an effect of fluidity and soft-like appearance.

Mersh was born in Dorset, studying art and design at the Arts Institute at Bournemouth. He then obtained a BA in multi-media textiles at Loughborough University (2003) and then moved to London to attend a Master's degree course in mixed-media constructed textiles at the Royal College of Art, where he graduated in 2005. The same year he was awarded the Mercury Music and Art Prize with his sculpture 'Shape of Music;' the Victoria and Albert Museum acquired 'Vinyl & CD Sculpture Part 2' and 'DNA Ball Sculpture' for its permanent collection.

Over the past six years Mersh has focused on making sculptures using sea shells. In 2016 he was awarded the Moët Hennessy Prize for Best Contemporary Design at PAD London (Pavillon d'Art et du Design).

== Work ==
Rowan Mersh's early artworks consisted in textile sculptures and kinetic installation. One of his textile sculptures, 'Vinyl and CD Sculpture Part 2', was made using CDs and vinyl records covered with stretched jersey fabric.

In 2009 Mersh took part in the group show 'Corn Craft' at Gallery FUMI - an exhibition that aimed at reconsidering the notion of beauty and luxury during time of economic struggle. For the occasion he worked at a dramatic ceiling installation made of 40000 individual pieces of corn strung onto mono-filament line.

In 2012 he participated in the project 'Future by Artisan' / 'Fatto a Mano' commissioned by Italian fashion house Fendi. 'Fatto a Mano' involved a collaboration between Fendi artisans and artists, such as Mersh, who were commissioned to reinterpret Fendi's traditional practices. Mersh created a machine that registered his heart rate and rhythmically punched small holes in leather strips. The final installation consisted in a colourful composition of leather strips woven onto a steel framework. This interactive performance-based installation was shown at Harrods during the 'London Design Festival' and then toured to the Salone Del Mobile (Milano) and the Venice Biennale (Venice).

Driven by his interest in sustainability Mersh participated to the charity event 'Pandamonium 2' – commissioned by WWF. Using surplus WWF paper the artist produced a wearable sculpture folding each sheet with origami techniques.

Since 2012 Mersh has mainly worked at large scale sculptures made of responsibly sourced sea shells: dentalium, turritella and capiz. The artist selects, cuts, sands and polishes each shell before assembling them by hand into patterns. Mersh associates the process of assembling the shells to drawing. He respects the natural shape of the material – the curvature of each shells informs the position of the following one and the construction process ends in self-informed brush strokes.

== Selected exhibitions ==
2018

- Now and Then | 10 Years of Collectable Creativity, Curated by Libby Sellers, Gallery FUMI, London, UK
- Salon Art + Design, New York, USA
- Homo Faber, Best of Europe, Curated by Jean Blancheart and Stefano Boeri, Venice, Italy

2017

- 'Praeteritum, Praesens et Futurum' by Rowan Mersh, Gallery FUMI, London, UK

2016

- Salon Art + Design, New York, USA

2015

- Design Days Dubai, Dubai, UAE

2014

- Design Miami/Basel, Basel, Switzerland

2012

- Fatto a Mano / Future of the Artisan – Fendi travelling commission: Venice Biennale, Salone del Mobile, Rome, Harrods, London, Paris, Geneva
- Pandamonium 2 – WWF, London, UK

2010

- Jerwood Contemporary Makers 2010, Jerwood Space, London
- George Frack Presents Tom Leamon and Rowan Mersh, Great Western Studios, London, UK
- In Every Dream Home – Gallery FUMI, London, UK

2009

- Corn Craft – Gallery FUMI, London, UK
- Maison et Objet, Rossana Orlandi – Paris, France

2008

- L.A.W.U.N. Projects – Architectural Association Archigram's David Greene Revisited, London, UK
- Fabric Sculpture (untitled) installed at Seamen's Hall – Somerset House, London, UK

2007

- Future Landscapes, Sculptural Canvases, Atrium Gallery, London, UK

2006

- Fabric Sculpture, Series II, Coutts, Strand, London, UK
- The Lipman Virus Launch, Lipman HQ, Camden Town, London, UK
- Chain Reaction Part 1, Studio Performance, Commercial Road, London, UK
- Kinetics, Urban Forest, Maison Blanche, Avenue Montaigne, Paris, France

2005

- Fabric Sculpture, Series I, Morgan and Lovell, Noel Street, London, UK
- Mercury Art Prize, The Air Gallery, Dover Street, London, UK

== Museums acquisitions ==
Victoria & Albert Museum, London – DNA Ball Sculpture – 2005

Victoria & Albert Museum, London – Vinyl and CD Sculpture Part II – 2005
