= Harvard Works Because We Do =

Book by Gregory Halpern

- Author: Gregory Halpern
- Language: English
- Genre: Photography
- Publisher: Quantuck Lane, W. W. Norton
- Publication date: 2003

Harvard Works Because We Do is a book of photographs by Gregory Halpern. The book was published in 2003 by Quantuck Lane / W. W. Norton, with an introduction by Studs Terkel. The photographs, compiled by Halpern while an undergraduate at Harvard University, document the lives of Harvard workers.

The photographs and the book were part of a campaign at Harvard University seeking higher wages for menial labor staff and other basic positions. The activism called for the minimum wage of Harvard workers being raised from $8 to $10.25 to match the minimum wage of Cambridge, Massachusetts, where the school is located. The result was that the minimum wage raised to $11.35 for janitors and $11.15 for security guards.
