= J&L Books =

Non-profit art press

- Status: Active
- Founded: 2000; 25 years ago
- Founders: Jason Fulford and Leanne Shapton
- Country of origin: United States
- Headquarters location: Atlanta
- Nonfiction topics: Books of photographs, drawings, art
- Official website: jandlbooks.org

J&L Books is a small, highly selective art press that publishes 3–5 books per year. It is a non-profit organisation based in Atlanta and in New York City. The press was founded and is run by Jason Fulford and Leanne Shapton. Fulford is a publisher, editor and book designer.

Primarily, J&L publishes books of photography, but also publishes books of drawing, fiction, non-fiction, and video art in DVD-form. Among the artists published by J&L are Harrell Fletcher, Bertrand Fleuret, Gregory Halpern, Corin Hewitt, Amy O'Neill, Ed Panar, Gus Powell, Michael Schmelling and Mike Slack.
