= Victor Burgin =

British artist and writer

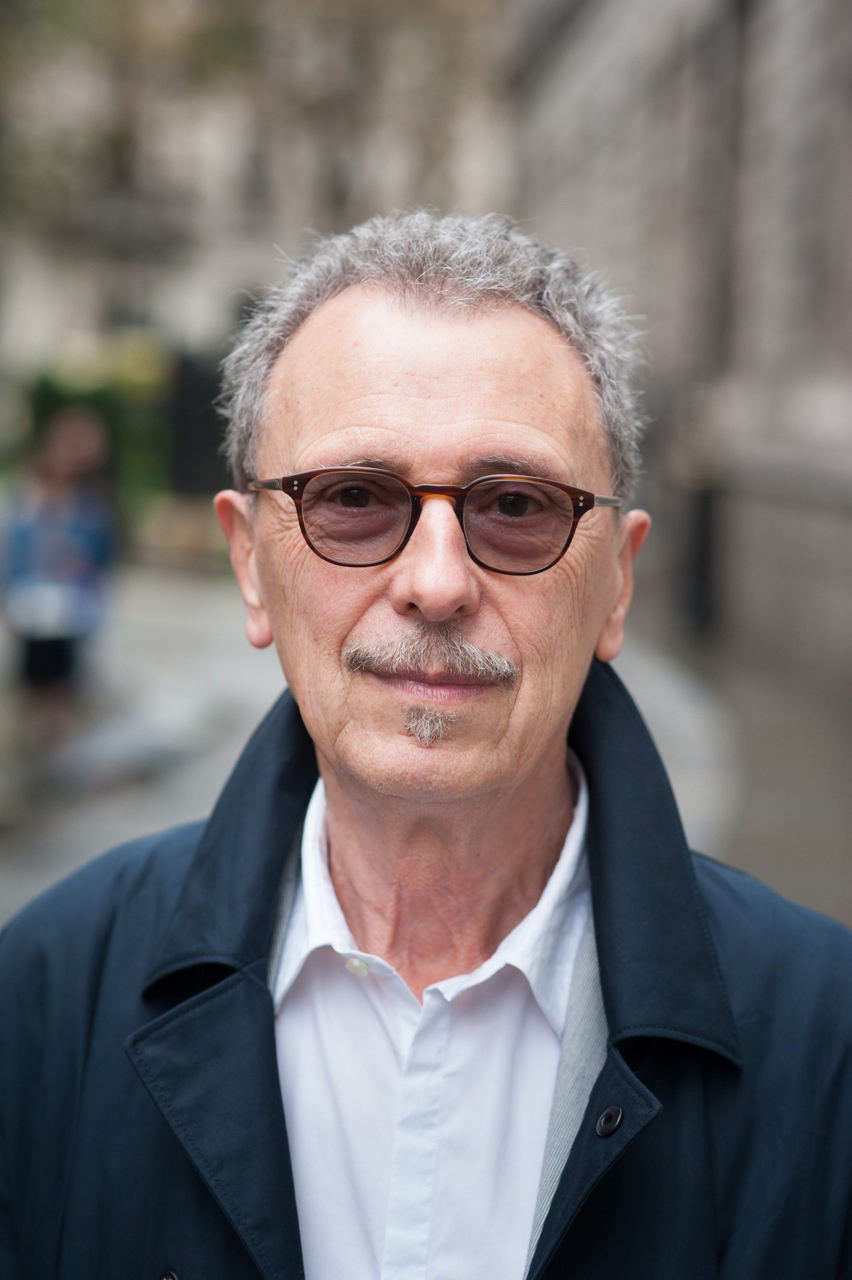
Victor Burgin, London 2019.

Victor Burgin (born 1941) is a British artist and writer.

== Early life and education ==
Burgin was born in Sheffield in England. He studied art at the Royal College of Art, in London, from 1962 to 1965 (A.R.C.A., 1st Class, 1965) before going to the United States to study at Yale University (M.F.A. 1967).

== Work ==
Burgin first came to attention as a conceptual artist in the late 1960s and at that time was most noted for being a political photographer of the left, who would fuse photographs and words in the same picture. He has worked with photography and film, calling painting "the anachronistic daubing of woven fabrics with coloured mud". His work is influenced by a variety of theorists and philosophers, most especially thinkers such as Sigmund Freud, Henri Lefebvre, André Breton, Maurice Merleau-Ponty, Michel Foucault and Roland Barthes. (European Graduate School Staff Page)

== Artistic development ==
Articulating the aesthetic with the political, Burgin's work evolves as a series of replies to questions about the nature of the art object and its relation to society. Originally trained as a painter, Burgin has subsequently worked with photography, video and computer animation. The Art Historian Stephen Bann observes: "... this progressive exploitation of new technologies appears in itself fairly uninteresting compared with the remarkable consistency of the underlying themes and propositions of his work."

While a student at Yale, Burgin took part in seminars given by the Minimalist sculptor Robert Morris. In his 1966 essay 'Notes on Sculpture' Morris advocates a work that displaces the viewer's attention from the art object as such to the relations between the object and its surroundings. Continuing Morris's phenomenological approach Burgin subsequently produced 'sculptures' that consist of nothing more than a set of recursive written sentences directing the reader's attention to their immediate perceptions and memories. The 'art object' here has no existence outside of the mental acts proposed in the succession of sentences, nor is an art gallery required to present it. For example, his work from 1970 – Any Moment – is composed so that it may be read in any situation whatsoever, whether in a room or on a bus.

Unhappy with the hermeticism of Conceptualism, Burgin turned to the kinds of combinations of photographs and text routinely encountered in everyday life, bringing his visual art practice into dialogue with a significant aspect of the sociopolitical environment. The philosopher Peter Osborne notes: "most of what passes for conceptual in art [today] has little relation with that more rigorously intellectual body of work from the 1960s and early 1970s that gave conceptual art its name ... Burgin's move to a politicised photographic art practice is best understood not as the rejection of a primarily conceptual art, but as the practical pursuit of its expanded conception."

Burgin's eleven-part work from 1976 – UK76 – combines a number of disparate references to the 1970s environment of print media. The form and contents of the photographs cite the documentary genre, the punning rhetoric of the text-image relations were current in publicity at that time, and the practice of "reversing out" text over a black and white photograph was common in such glossy magazines as Vogue. UK76 cites the poster both in size (photographs in galleries at that time were usually small "fine prints") and, in being pasted to the wall, in the form of its presentation. In content, the work ironizes media representations of class, race and gender. In addition to making poster-like works for the gallery Burgin also made works such as Possession (1976) which were posted in the streets.

Burgin's work towards a 'left' art practice, in both artworks and historical and theoretical research led him to conclude that art with an overtly political content is politically ineffective. Informed by the French marxist philosopher Louis Althusser's notion of the 'specificity' of political practices, notably exemplified by Feminism, Burgin now saw the form of politics particular to art to lie in the sphere of representations, urging we "distinguish between the representation of politics and the politics of representation." The 1980s were a time of intense debate around questions of visual representations and sexuality, to which Burgin contributed both through such essays as 'Diderot, Barthes, Vertigo' [1986, in Alexander Streiberger (ed.), Situation Aesthetics: Selected Writings by Victor Burgin, Leuven, Leuven University, 2009] and such artworks as his 1982 series "Tales from Freud."

Burgin defines the political work of the artist as resistance to "the progressive colonisation of the terrain of languages, beliefs and values by mainstream media contents and forms which impose an industrial uniformity upon what may be imagined and said ..." His recent work enlarges the phenomenological perspective of such early works as Any Moment to include the 'real' of all that is present at a particular time and place, a task strictly impossible as: "The real is by definition that which stands outside representations. ... Representation always comes too late, it can never be equivalent to the real, coextensive or isomorphic with it. Representations, however, may be equivalent to reality, as reality is itself already an assembly of representations."

== Academic career ==
Burgin taught at Trent Polytechnic from 1967 to 1973 and at the School of Communication, Polytechnic of Central London from 1973 to 1988. From 1988 to 2001 Burgin lived and worked in San Francisco. He taught in the History of Consciousness program at the University of California, Santa Cruz, where he became Professor Emeritus of History of Consciousness. In 2000 he was Robert Gwathmey Chair in Art and Architecture, The Cooper Union for the Advancement of Science and Art, New York. From 2001 to 2006 he was Millard Professor of Fine Art at Goldsmiths College, University of London. He is currently Professor of Visual Studies, Winchester School of Art, University of Southampton.

== Honours and awards ==
In 1986, Burgin was nominated for the Turner Prize for his exhibitions at the Institute of Contemporary Arts and Kettle's Yard Gallery in Cambridge and for a collection of his theoretical writings (The End of Art Theory) and a monograph of his visual work (Between). In 2005 he received an Honorary Degree of Doctor of Sheffield Hallam University (Hon. DUniv). In 2010 he received a Doctorat Honoris Causa from the Université de Liège.

== Public commissions ==
- 1976 'What does possession mean to you?,' color poster, 1000 copies posted in the streets in the center of Newcastle upon Tyne, summer; other poster works, various dates.
- 1987 Fall, Video-wall (36 monitors), two-minute videodisk programme, Mississauga Shopping Mall, and other locations, Toronto.
- 1989 Fall, Video-wall [Edited version (9 monitors)], two-minute videodisk programme, Tate Gallery, London.
- 1989 Original print for 'Estampes et Revolution: 200 Ans Après,' Centre National des Arts Plastiques, Ministère de la Culture et de la Communication, France (100 sets of prints, commissioned from an international selection of artists, and distributed throughout France as part of the Bicentennial Celebration of the French Revolution).
- 1993 Poster for 'Images pour la lutte contre le sida', Ministère de la Culture et de la Communication, France/Agence française de lutte contre le sida: national poster campaign with posters commissioned from an international selection of 35 artists.
- 1993 Venise, 30 min video, Ville de Marseille, France.
- 1994 Design for permanent video installation for the Hotel Furkablick, Furkapasshöhe, Switzerland.
- 1994 Permanent video installation for the Médiatheque d'Orléans, Ville d'Orléans, France.
- 2004 Restored, Permanent video installation for London Symphony Orchestra, St. Luke's, Old Street, London.
- 2021 'Division/Revision', poster project curated by Uta Kögelsberger, Newcastle University

== Publications ==
=== Books by Burgin ===
- 1973 Work and Commentary, London, Latimer
- 1976 Two Essays on Art, Photography and Semiotics, London, Robert Self Publications
- 1977 Victor Burgin, Eindhoven, Stedelijk van abbemuseum
- 1977 Family, New York, Lapp Princess, in association with Printer Matter
- 1982 Hôtel Latône, Calais, Musée de Calais
- 1982 Thinking Photography, Victor Burgin (ed.), [Burgin: Introduction, three essays, bibliography], Macmillan, London and Basingstoke, and Humanities Press International, New Jersey (1982), reprinted 1983, 1984, 1985, 1987 (twice), 1988, 1990, 1992, 1993, 1994
- 1986 Formations of Fantasy, (co-edited with Donald, J. and Kaplan, C.), Methuen, London
- 1986 Between, Basil Blackwell, Oxford and New York
  - 2020 (second edition), Mack, London
- 1986 The End of Art Theory: Criticism and Postmodernity, Macmillan, London and Basingstoke, and Humanities Press International, New Jersey (1986), reprinted 1987, 1988, 1992, 1993, 1996
  - 1995 Japanese translation of The End of Art Theory: Criticism and Postmodernity, Tokyo, Keiso Shobo
- 1988 Victor Burgin: Office at Night and Danaïdes/Dames, Charlotte, North Carolina, Knight Gallery, City of Charlotte
- 1988 Victor Burgin, Opere 1982–1986, Milan, Le Case d'Arte
- 1989 Taideteorian Loppu, Helsinki, Suomen Valokuvataiteen Museon Säätiö, Literos, collection of essays by Burgin in Finnish translation
- 1991 Passages, Lille, Musée d'art moderne de la Communaté Urbaine de Lille, Villeneuve d'Ascq
- 1995 History Painting, Buffalo, University at Buffalo Art Gallery/Research Center in Art + Culture
- 1996 Some Cities, Berkeley and Los Angeles, University of California Press, and London, Reaktion
- 1996 In/Different Spaces: place and memory in visual culture, Berkeley and Los Angeles, University of California Press
- 1997 Szerelmes Levelek/Love Letters, Mücsarnok Museum, Budapest
- 2000 Victor Burgin: Robert Gwathmey Lectures, New York, Cooper Union for the Advancement of Science and Art 1997 Venise, London, Black Dog Publishing
- 2000 Shadowed, London, Architectural Association
- 2001 Victor Burgin, Barcelona, Fundació Antoni Tàpies
- 2002 Relocating, London and Bristol, Arnolfini
- 2004 Ensayos, Barcelona, Gustavo Gili
- 2004 The Remembered Film, London, Reaktion
- 2006 Victor Burgin: Voyage to Italy, Hatje Cantz
- 2007 Objets Temporels, Boulouch, Nathalie; Mavridorakis, Valérie; Perreau, David (Eds.), Presses Universitaires de Rennes
- 2008 Components of a Practice, Skira
- 2009 Situational Aesthetics, Leuven University Press
- 2013 Palmanova, Victor Burgin, Teresa Castro, Evgenia Giannouri, Lucia Monteiro, Clara Schulmann, Form[e]s, Paris
- 2014 Five Pieces for Projection, Museum für Gegenwartskunst, Seigen
- 2016 Scripts, Musée d'Art Moderne et Contemporain, Geneva
- 2016 Barthes/Burgin: Research Notes for an Exhibition, Ryan Bishop and Sunil Manghani (eds), Edinburgh University Press
- 2018 The Camera – Essence and Apparatus, Mack, London
- 2019 Mandarin, Juxta, Milan
- 2019 Afterlife, Galerie Thomas Zander & Walther König
- 2019 Le Film qui me reste en mémoire, French translation of The Remembered Film, Mimesis, Paris
- 2020: Between (Second Edition), Mack, London
- 2020: Psychical Realism - The Work of Victor Burgin, Leuven University Press
- 2025: Returning to Benjamin : Art in the Age of AI, Mack, London
- 2025: Formes d'idéologie : écrits sur l'image, Mimésis, Milan

=== Books about Burgin ===
- 2014 Projective – Essays on the works of Victor Burgin, Victor Burgin, Gülru Çakmak, David Campany, Homay King, David Rodowick, Anthony Vidler, Musée d'Art Moderne et Contemporain, Geneva
- 2014 ''Projectif – Essais sur l'oeuvre de Victor Burgin, French translation of Projective
- 2017 Victor Burgin's Parzival in Leuven – Reflections on the "Uncinematic", Stéphane Symons (ed.), Leuven University Press
- 2019 Seeing Degree Zero, Barthes/Burgin and Political Aesthetics, Ryan Bishop and Sunil Manghani (eds), Edinburgh University Press
- 2020 Alexander Streitberger, Psychical Realism – The work of Victor Burgin, Leuven University Press
