= McNair Evans =

American photographer

McNair Evans (born 1979) is an American photographer living and working in San Francisco, California, and Laurinburg, North Carolina.

Evans' photographs document the changing American cultural landscape in the face of forces of modernization and focus heavily on the stories of individuals impacted by these forces to explore themes of shared experience and values. His work presents personal, sometimes autobiographical, subject matter in unconventional narrative form, and has been recognized for its literary character.

== Early life and education ==
Evans grew up in the farming town of Laurinburg, North Carolina, and became interested in photography while studying cultural anthropology at Davidson College. He became serious about the medium while working as a fly fishing instructor in the greater Yellowstone ecosystem. He continued his education through mentorships with New Documentary photographer Mike Smith of Johnson City, Tennessee, and Magnum Photos photographer Alec Soth, and completed a Master's in Fine Arts degree from Academy of Art University, San Francisco, in 2011.

== Career ==
Evans is the recipient of a Guggenheim Fellowship, 2016 and a John Gutmann Foundation Fellowship, 2015. He was artist in residence at The Rayko Photo Center, San Francisco, and the recipient of the 2013 Paul Conlan Prize. His photographs are held in major public and private collections, including the San Francisco Museum of Modern Art, and his work has been featured in exhibition settings and editorial publications including Harper's Magazine, The New Yorker, The Wall Street Journal, San Francisco Chronicle, and Financial Times, as well as on the cover of William Faulkner's novel, Flags in the Dust.

He has served as a lecturer in photography at University of California, Berkeley, The San Francisco Photo Alliance, The Hartford School, and University of South Carolina, among others institutions.

His first full-length book, Confessions for a Son, was released by Owl and Tiger Press in 2015. He is currently working on a project documenting the experiences of long-haul Amtrak train travelers.
