= Polly Braden =

Scottish photographer

Polly Braden (born 1974) is a Scottish documentary photographer, living in London. Her work on learning disabilities and autism has been shown in exhibitions at the National Science and Media Museum in Bradford and at mac, Birmingham. Her work on single parent families has been shown in exhibitions at the Museum of the Home in London and Open Eye Gallery in Liverpool. Braden won Photographer of the Year in the Guardian Student Media Award in 2002.

== Life and work ==
Braden was born in Perthshire, Scotland. She graduated from London College of Printing in 2003. She lives in London and is a single parent.

Her subjects have included China (where she lived for over 15 years), the City of London, single parent families, and learning disabilities and autism.

Polly Braden’s Leaving Ukraine is a photography and film project that intimately documents the lives of women and children uprooted by the Russian invasion of Ukraine beginning in February 2022.

== Publications ==
=== Books of work by Braden ===
- China Between. Stockport: Dewi Lewis, 2010. ISBN 978-1-904587-88-0. With essays by David Campany and Jennifer Higgie.
- Great Interactions: Life with Learning Disabilities and Autism. Stockport: Dewi Lewis, 2016. ISBN 978-1-907893-86-5. With an interview by David Campany and an afterword by Sophie Howarth.
- London Square Mile: a Secret City. Tales from the City: Book 8. Hoxton Mini, 2019. ISBN 978-1-910566-44-2. With an essay by David Kynaston.

=== Books with one other ===
- Adventures in the Lea Valley. East London Photo Stories: Book 12. Hoxton Mini, 2016. With David Campany. ISBN 978-1-910566-12-1.
- Out of the Shadows: the untold story of people with autism or learning disabilities. Stockport: Dewi Lewis; West Bromwich: Multistory, 2018. With seven stories by Sally Williams and three first-hand accounts. ISBN 978-1-911306-36-8.
- A Place For Me: 50 Stories of Finding Home. Stockport: Dewi Lewis, 2022. With Sally Williams. ISBN 978-1-911306-83-2.

=== Books with contributions by Braden ===
- Street Photography Now. London: Thames & Hudson, 2010. ISBN 978-0-500-54393-1 (hardback). London: Thames & Hudson, 2011. ISBN 978-0-500-28907-5 (paperback). Edited by Sophie Howarth and Stephen McLaren. Includes work by Braden made in China.

== Exhibitions ==
=== Solo exhibitions and similar ===
- Great Interactions: Photographs by Polly Braden, National Science and Media Museum, Bradford, 2016
- Polly Braden & Sally Williams: Out of the Shadows: the untold story of people with autism or learning disabilities, mac, Birmingham, 2018
- Holding The Baby, Museum of the Home, London, 2021; Open Eye Gallery, Liverpool, 2021. With text by Claire-Louise Bennett and Sally Williams.
- Holding The Baby, Arnolfini, Bristol, 2022
- Leaving Ukraine, Foundling Museum, London, 2024

=== Group exhibitions ===
- Real Estate: Art in a Changing City, Institute of Contemporary Arts, London, 2005 included Adventures in the Valley (Ongoing) with Campany
- Made in China, Museum of Contemporary Photography, Chicago, 2006
- London Street Photography: 1860–2010, Museum of London, London, 2011

== Awards ==
- 2002: Winner, Photographer of the Year, Guardian Student Media Award

== Collections ==
Braden's work is held in the following permanent collection:

- Guildhall Art Gallery, London
