= Tamara Shopsin =

American artist, author and cook

Tamara Shopsin is an American graphic designer, illustrator, author, and cook. She has written memoirs, novels, and children's books, and her illustrations have appeared in The New Yorker and The New York Times.

Along with her siblings, Melinda Shopsin and Zack Shopsin, she runs the New York City restaurant Shopsin's.

== Life and career ==
Shopsin was born in New York to parents Eve and Kenny Shopsin. She grew up in Greenwich Village in New York City with four siblings, including her twin, Melinda. Her family ran Shopsin’s General Store, and her father was a chef and owner of their family's restaurant. She is married to Jason Fulford, a photographer. After her father's death, she and her siblings took over their father's restaurant, Shopsin's.

Shopsin's illustrated memoir about her journey with an undiagnosed illness, Mumbai New York Scranton , was published in 2013. In 2017, her memoir Arbitrary Stupid Goal was published; the book chronicles her upbringing in her family's store and restaurant.

Her first novel, LaserWriter II, was published in 2021.

She and her husband have worked together on various picture books for children. They created the 2014 photography-based picture book, This Equals That. Each page spread in the book contains two photographs that have a visual relation to one another. The book was released by the photography magazine Aperture as part of a series of educational photography books. In 2018, her and Fulord's book, A Pile of Leaves, was published. The book contains cut-out leaves in transparent sheets for each page, that allows readers to look for hidden objects between the layers of pages. Their board book, Find Colors, was published in 2018.
