= Tchotchke =

Term describing a miscellaneous item

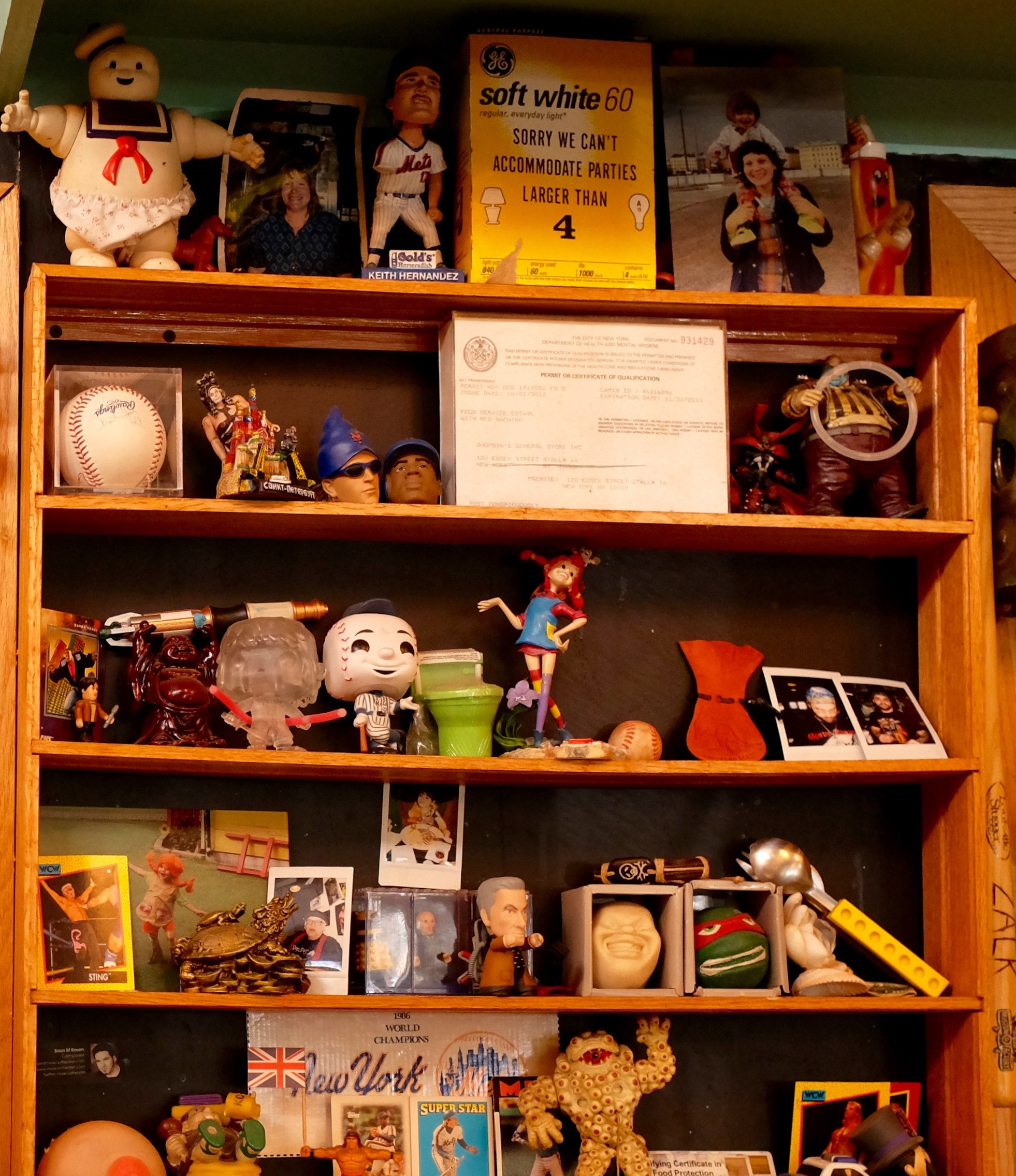
A cabinet of tchotchkes and memorabilia behind the counter at Shopsin's in the Essex Street Market in New York City

A tchotchke (/ˈtʃɒtʃkə/ CHOTCH-kə or /ˈtʃɒtʃki/ CHOTCH-kee) is a small bric-à-brac or trinket. The word has been used by Jewish Americans and in the regional speech of New York City and elsewhere since the 1970s. It is borrowed from Yiddish and is ultimately Slavic in origin.

The word may also refer to free promotional items dispensed at trade shows, conventions, and similar commercial events. They can also be sold as cheap souvenirs in tourist areas, which are sometimes called "tchotchke shops".

== Etymology and spelling ==
The word tchotchke derives from a Slavic word for "trinket" (Ukrainian: цяцька, romanized: tsiatska [ˈtsʲɑtsʲkɐ]; Polish: cacko [ˈt͡sat͡skɔ], pl. cacka; Slovak: čačka [ˈtʂatʂka]; Belarusian: цацка, romanized: tsatska [ˈt͡sat͡ska]; Russian: цацка, romanized: tsatska [ˈtsatskə]), adapted to Yiddish singular טשאַטשקע tshatshke.

A wide variety of spellings exist for the English usage of the term, such as tchatchke, tshotshke, tshatshke, tchachke, tchotchka, tchatchka, chachke, tsotchke, chotski, and chochke; the standard Yiddish transliteration is tsatske or tshatshke. In YIVO standard orthography, it is spelled טשאַטשקע. In Israeli Hebrew it is often spelled צאצקע, [ˈtsatske], with a tsade instead of teth-shin, as in Yiddish. A Hebrew variant is צ׳אצ׳קע, using צ (tsade) with a geresh to represent the sound [t͡ʃ].

== Alternative meanings and context ==
Depending on the context, the term has a connotation of worthlessness or disposability as well as tackiness.

A common confusion is between the terms tchotchke and tsatske or, rather, tsatskele, with the diminutive ending -le. Both terms have the same Slavic root. Tchotchke usually references trinkets, while tsatskele is more likely to mean a young girl or woman who uses her charms to reach her goals. Being Yiddish, the meaning can change by the use of gestures and a change in tone, so that tsatskele can become the favorite child.

Leo Rosten, author of The Joys of Yiddish, also documents a sense of tchotchke as meaning a young girl, a "pretty young thing", as well as noting pejorative usage ("a loose or kept woman"; "a sexy but brainless broad").

== See also ==
- Promotional merchandise – Products distributed to promote a brand
- Feelie – Items shipped with video games
