= I Like Killing Flies =

2004 film by Matt Mahurin

- Directed by: Matt Mahurin
- Produced by: Matt Mahurin
- Cinematography: Matt Mahurin
- Edited by: Matt Mahurin
- Music by: Chris Toland
- Distributed by: THINKFilm, Red Envelope Entertainment
- Release date: January 2004 (Sundance): July 28, 2006 (United States)
- Running time: 78 minutes
- Language: English

I Like Killing Flies is a 2004 documentary film produced, directed, filmed, and edited by Matt Mahurin. It documents Shopsins restaurant in New York City's Greenwich Village and its owner and head cook, Kenny Shopsin. In 2002 and 2003, Mahurin followed Shopsin in his final year at the location he ran for over 30 years. Throughout the film, Shopsin offers what he calls "half-baked" philosophy, peppered with profanities.

In the first half, Shopsin opens his eatery for the day and talks about his kitchen, his business, his employees, and his customers. We meet the regulars and friends who eat some of the 900 eclectic dishes he prepares, and we learn the rules of the restaurant: all customers must eat, parties of four or more are unwelcome, and anyone who irritates the owner will be swiftly shown the door. Shopsin's wife and children, all of whom work at the restaurant, weigh in on what it's like to work for this eccentric and occasionally hot-tempered man.

In the film's second half, Shopsin loses his lease and is forced to move his establishment to a larger location on nearby Carmine Street. Family, friends, and customers all pitch in to help with the move. Everything must go, from hundreds of knick-knacks and supplies to an alarmingly rickety stove. The reopening is a resounding success. The epilogue grants the audience one last glimpse of Shopsin's life the following year, and it is revealed that Shopsin's wife has died, but he seems not to have changed at all.

Shopsin, who has been profiled in The New Yorker by Calvin Trillin, wrote a 2008 book with Carolynn Carreño entitled Eat Me: The Food and Philosophy of Kenny Shopsin.
