= Alec Soth =

American photographer

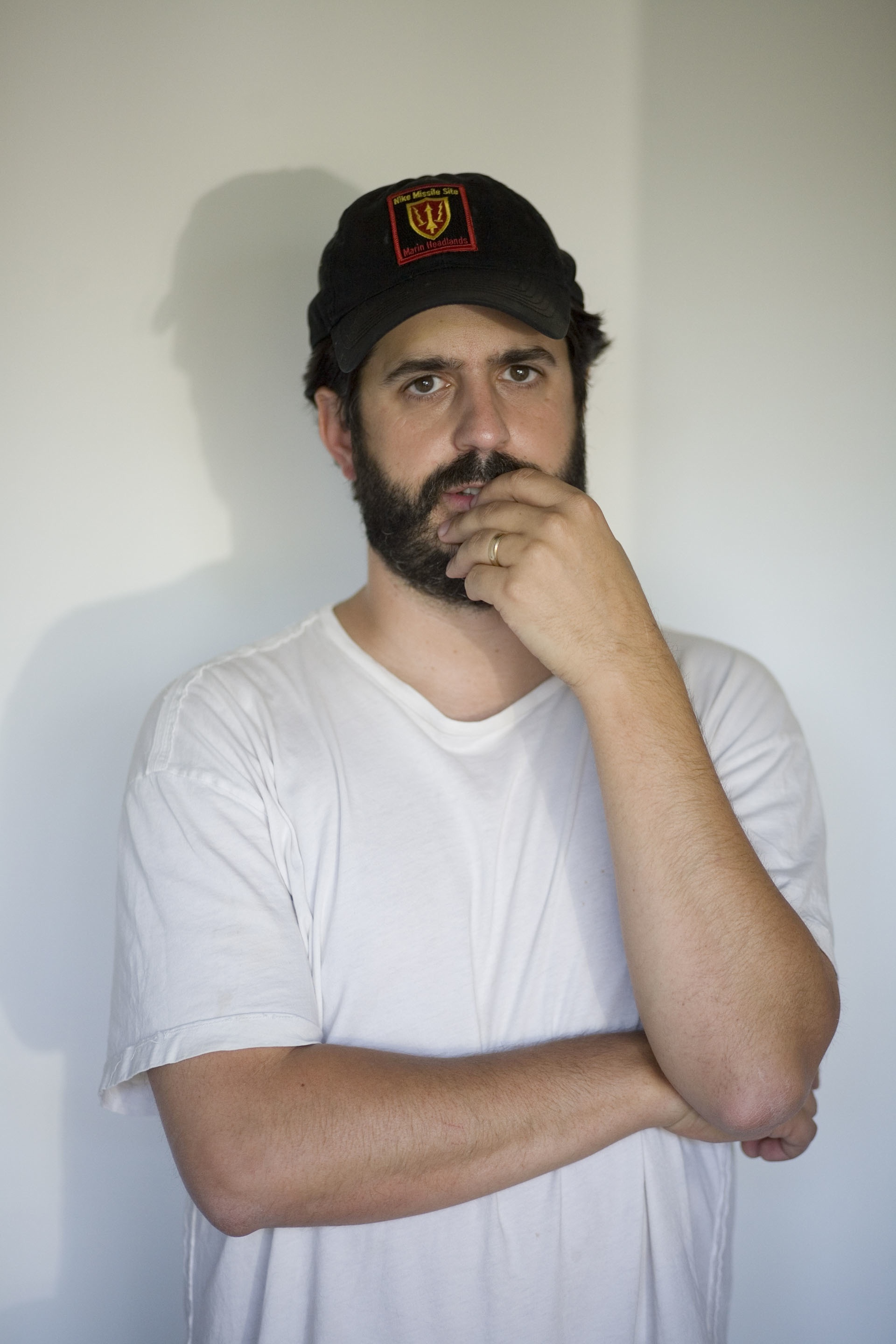
- Soth in his studio
- Born: 1969 (age 56–57); Minneapolis, Minnesota, United States
- Education: Sarah Lawrence College
- Occupation: Photography
- Website: alecsoth.com

Alec Soth (born 1969) is an American photographer, based in Minneapolis. Soth makes "large-scale American projects" featuring the midwestern United States. New York Times art critic Hilarie M. Sheets wrote that he has made a "photographic career out of finding chemistry with strangers" and photographs "loners and dreamers". His work tends to focus on the "off-beat, hauntingly banal images of modern America" according to The Guardian art critic Hannah Booth. He is a member of Magnum Photos.

Soth has had various books of his work published by major publishers as well as self-published through his own Little Brown Mushroom. His major publications are Sleeping by the Mississippi, Niagara, Broken Manual, Songbook, I Know How Furiously Your Heart Is Beating, and A Pound of Pictures.

He has received fellowships from the McKnight and Jerome Foundations, was the recipient of the 2003 Santa Fe Prize for Photography, and in 2021 received an Honorary Fellowship of the Royal Photographic Society. His photographs are in the collections of the San Francisco Museum of Modern Art, the Museum of Fine Arts Houston, the Minneapolis Institute of Arts, and the Walker Art Center. His work has been exhibited widely including as part of the 2004 Whitney Biennial and a major solo exhibition at Media Space in London in 2015.

== Early life and education ==
Soth was born in Minneapolis, Minnesota, United States. He studied at Sarah Lawrence College in Bronxville, New York. He was reported to be "painfully shy" in his youth.

== Work ==
=== Photography ===
Soth liked the work of Diane Arbus. He traveled around the Mississippi River and made a self-printed book entitled Sleeping by the Mississippi which included both landscapes and portraits. Curators for the 2004 Whitney Biennial put him in their show, and one of his photographs entitled "Charles", of a man in a flight suit on his roof holding two model airplanes, was used in their poster.

Soth's work has since been compared to that of Walker Evans and Stephen Shore. He has photographed for The New York Times Magazine, Fortune and Newsweek.

When he photographs people, Soth feels nervous at times. He said: "My own awkwardness comforts people, I think. It's part of the exchange." When he was on the road, he'd have notes describing types of pictures he wanted taped to the steering wheel of his car. One list was: "beards, birdwatchers, mushroom hunters, men's retreats, after the rain, figures from behind, suitcases, tall people (especially skinny), targets, tents, treehouses and tree lines". With people, he'll ask their permission to photograph them, and often wait for them to get comfortable; he sometimes uses an 8x10 camera. He tries to find a "narrative arc and true storytelling" and pictures in which each picture will lead to the next one.

Soth has been photographing different parts of the US since his first book, Sleeping by the Mississippi, was published in 2004. His second book, Niagara, was published in 2006. One of his photos is of a woman in a bridal gown sitting outside what appears to be a motel; he describes having made an arrangement with a particular wedding chapel in Niagara Falls which let him take pictures of couples getting married, by photographing them after their weddings.

Soth made several more photographic books including Last Days of W, a book about a country "exhausted by George W. Bush's presidency".

Soth spent the years between 2006 and 2010 exploring the idea of retreat. Using the pseudonym Lester B. Morrison, he created Broken Manual over four years (2006–2010) an underground instruction manual for those looking to escape their lives. Soth investigates the places in which people retreat to escape civilization, he photographs monks, survivalists, hermits and runaways. He concurrently produced the photo book From Here to There: Alec Soth's America, an overview of Soth's photography from the early 1990s to the present.

In 2010, Soth flew to the United Kingdom but despite not having applied for a work visa was allowed into the country on the understanding that if he was "caught taking photographs" he could be put in prison for two years. So he handed the camera to his young daughter who took pictures in Brighton.

A 2016 photo exhibition, titled Hypnagogia, featured 30 images from Soth's 20-year exploration of the state between wakefulness and sleep. "Described as a neurological phenomenon, one recurrently associated with creativity, a hypnagogic state is the dreamlike experience while awake that conjures vivid, sometimes realistic imagery," Soth explained in the artist statement for the project.

Following a 2016 assignment on a laughter yoga workshop in India for The New York Times Magazine, Soth stopped working for a year. During an art residency in San Francisco in 2017, later returned to his practice when the choreographer Anna Halprin, who was 97 at the time, invited him to photograph her at her home.

=== Publishing ===
In 2010, Soth founded the publishing house, Little Brown Mushroom (LBM). Through it, he publishes his own, and that of other like-minded people, "narrative photography books that function in a similar way to children's books," in book, magazine and newspaper formats. He has collaborated on numerous books with Brad Zellar, a Minnesota writer from the Twin Cities.

== Art market ==
In 2004, Soth became a nominee of the Magnum Photos agency and in 2008 became a full member. Early in his career, he was also taken up by Gagosian Gallery and is now represented by Sean Kelly Gallery in New York.

== Personal life ==
Soth lives with his wife Rachel Cartee and their children in Minneapolis, Minnesota.

== Publications ==
=== Books of work by Soth ===
- Sleeping by the Mississippi. With essays by Patricia Hampl and Anne Wilkes Tucker and "Selected Notes to the Photographs".
  - Göttingen: Steidl, 2004. ISBN 9783865210074.
  - Göttingen: Steidl, 2008. ISBN 978-3-86521-753-0.
  - Expanded edition with 2 additional photographs. London: Mack. ISBN 978-1-910614-89-1.
- Niagara. Göttingen: Steidl, 2008. ISBN 978-3865212337. Photographs by Alec Soth, essays by Richard Ford,"1962", and Philip Brookman, "Over the Rainbow: Alec Soth's Niagara".
  - London: Mack, 2018. ISBN 978-1-912339-259.
- Fashion Magazine. Paris: Magnum, 2007. ISBN 978-2-9524102-1-2.
- Dog Days Bogota. Göttingen: Steidl, 2007. ISBN 978-3-865214-51-5.
- Last Days of W. St. Paul, MN: Little Brown Mushroom, 2008.
- Sheep. TBW Subscription Series #2. Oakland, CA: TBW, 2009. Edition of 800 copies. The other volumes are by Todd Hido, Abner Nolan and Marianne Mueller.
- Broken Manual. Göttingen: Steidl, 2010. ISBN 978-3-869301-99-0. With Lester B. Morrison.
- From Here to There: Alec Soth's America. Minneapolis, MN: Walker Art Center, 2010. ISBN 978-0-935640-96-0. Catalogue of a retrospective exhibition curated by Siri Engberg. Foreword by Olga Viso; texts by Geoff Dyer, "Riverrun"; Britt Salvesen, "American History"; Barry Schwabsky, "A Wandering Art"; a poem by August Kleinzahler, "Sleeping it off in Rapid City"; and Soth in conversation with Bartholomew Ryan, "Dismantling My Career". Includes separate book The Loneliest Man in Missouri by Soth, inserted into back cover.
- Ash Wednesday, New Orleans. Kamakura, Japan: Super Labo, 2010.
- One Mississippi. Nazraeli, 2010.
- Lonely Boy Mag. No. A-1: Alec Soth's Midwestern Exotica. St. Paul, MN: Little Brown Mushroom, 2011. Edition of 1000 copies. Photographs and text by Soth.
- One Day: 10 Photographers. Heidelberg: Kehrer, 2011. ISBN 978-3-86828-173-6. A boxed set of ten books of photographs taken on 21 June 2010. Edited by Harvey Benge. The other books are by Jessica Backhaus, Gerry Badger, Benge, John Gossage, Todd Hido, Rob Hornstra, Rinko Kawauchi, Eva Maria Ocherbauer and Martin Parr.
- La Belle Dame Sans Merci. Edizioni Punctum, 2011. Edition of 500 copies.
  - Italian-language edition. Text in Italian. 175 copies of the 500 total edition.
- Looking for Love. Berlin: Kominek Bücher, 2012.
- Bogota Funsaver. One Picture Book 88. Portland, OR: Nazraeli, 2014. ISBN 9781590054178. Edition of 500 copies.
- Songbook. Göttingen. London: Mack, 2015. ISBN 978-1910164020.
- Gathered Leaves. London: Mack, 2015. ISBN 9781910164365. 29 large format postcards and mini facsimile versions of Sleeping by the Mississippi, Niagara, Broken Manual, and Songbook. With an introduction by Kate Bush and an essay by Aaron Schuman.
- I Know How Furiously Your Heart Is Beating. London: Mack, 2019. ISBN 978-1-912339-31-0. Includes an interview with Soth by Hanya Yanagihara.
- A Pound of Pictures. London: Mack, 2022. ISBN 978-1-913620-11-0.
- Gathered Leaves Annotated. London: Mack, 2022. ISBN 978-1-913620-78-3

=== Publications with others ===
- Suburban World: The Norling Photos. Saint Paul, MN: Minnesota Historical Society; Borealis, 2008. ISBN 9780873516099. Brad Zellar, Irwin D. Norling, Soth.
- The Auckland Project. Santa Fe, NM: Radius, 2011. ISBN 978-1-934435-26-7. Two volumes in a slipcase, the other is by John Gossage, Southern stars: a guide to the constellations visible in the southern hemisphere.
- Alec Soth's Lonely Boy Mag 2: Boys and Their Cars. St. Paul, MN: Little Brown Mushroom, 2011. Text and photographs by Todd Hido, Soth, Chad States and erotic dioramas by Peter Davidson. Edition of 1000 copies.
- The 1968 Project: A Nation Coming of Age. Saint Paul, MN: Minnesota Historical Society, 2011. ISBN 9780873518420. Brad Zellar, Soth.
- Rodarte. JRP|Ringier, 2011. Photographs by Soth and Catherine Opie.
- House of Coates. Photographs by Alec Soth and Lester B. Morrison, text by Brad Zellar.
  - Saint Paul, MN: Little Brown Mushroom, 2012. ISBN 9781199591036.
  - Coffee House, 2014. ISBN 978-1566893701.
- Ohio. LBM Dispatch #1. Saint Paul, MN: Little Brown Mushroom, 2012. ASIN B008ESQB4Y. Text by Brad Zellar. Edition of 2000 copies.
- Upstate. LBM Dispatch #2. Saint Paul, MN: Little Brown Mushroom, 2012. Text by Brad Zellar. Edition of 2000 copies.
- Michigan. LBM Dispatch #3. Saint Paul, MN: Little Brown Mushroom, 2012. ASIN B00BT1KY14. Text by Brad Zellar. Edition of 2000 copies.
- Three Valleys. LBM Dispatch #4. Saint Paul, MN: Little Brown Mushroom, 2013. Text by Brad Zellar. Edition of 2000 copies.
- Colorado. LBM Dispatch #5. Saint Paul, MN: Little Brown Mushroom, 2013. Text by Brad Zellar Edition of 2000 copies.
- Texas. LBM Dispatch #6. Saint Paul, MN: Little Brown Mushroom, 2013. Text by Brad Zellar. Edition of 2000 copies.
- Georgia. LBM Dispatch #7. Saint Paul, MN: Little Brown Mushroom, 2014. Text by Brad Zellar. Edition of 2000 copies.
- Ping Pong Conversations: Alec Soth with Francesco Zanot. Rome: Contrasto, 2013. ISBN 978-8869654091. Transcripts compiled from conversations between Soth and Zanot, with new and previously published photographs by Soth. Zanot contributes an introduction, "Alec Soth: the Recycling of Photography".
- The Parameters of Our Cage. London: Mack, 2020. ISBN 978-1-913620-15-8. Correspondence between Soth and Christopher Fausto Cabrera, an inmate in the Minnesota Correctional Facility.

=== Books edited or with contributions by Soth ===
- The Image To Come: How Cinema Inspires Photographers. Göttingen: Steidl, 2007.
- Georgian Spring: A Magnum Journal = ქართულიგაზაფხული მაგნუმი ს დღიურები. London: Chris Boot, New York: Magnum, 2009. ISBN 978-1905712151. Introduction by Wendell Steavenson. Photographs by various Magnum photographers.
- Brighton Picture Hunt. Brighton: Photoworks, 2010. ISBN 978-1903796429. Photographs by Carmen Soth, edited by Soth.
- Postcards From America. Photographs by Soth, Jim Goldberg, Susan Meiselas, Paolo Pellegrin, Mikhael Subotzky, and Ginger Strand. Magnum, 2012. A book, bumper stickers, a newspaper, two fold-outs, three cards, a poster and five zines, all in a box. Edition of 500 copies.
- About Face. San Francisco: Pier 24 Photography, 2014. ISBN 978-0-9839917-2-4. With essays by Philip Gefter, Sandra S. Phillips, and Ulrike Schneider. Edition of 1000 copies. Exhibition catalog.
- The Open Road: Photography & the American Road Trip. Edited and with text by David Campany. Photographs by various.
  - New York: Aperture, 2014. ISBN 978-1-59711-240-6.
  - Road Trips: Voyages photographiques à travers l'Amérique. Paris: Textuel, 2014. ISBN 9782845975002. French-language version.
  - En la Carretera: Viajes fotográficos a través de Norteamérica. Madrid: La Fábrica, 2014. ISBN 9788415691822. Spanish-language version.
- Rochester 585/716: A Postcard from America Project. New York: Aperture; San Francisco: Pier 24 Photography, 2015. ISBN 978-1-59711-340-3. Edition of 1000 copies. Photographs by various Magnum photographers.
- ABC Photography. Berlin: Tarzipan, 2017. Photographs by various. Text by Monte Packham.
- Home. Tokyo: Magnum Photos Tokyo, 2018. ISBN 978-4-9909806-0-3.

== Solo exhibitions ==
- 2006: Alec Soth 'Niagara', Gagosian Gallery, New York City
- 2009/10: Niagara, Williams College Museum of Art, Williamstown, MA
- 2010/11: Alec Soth: Black line of woods, High Museum of Art, Atlanta, GA
- 2010: Mississippi Niagara, Triennale di Milano, Milan
- 2010/11: Alec Soth: From here to there, Walker Art Center, Minneapolis, MN
- 2012: Alec Soth: La Belle Dame sans Merci, Multimedia Art Museum, Moscow, Central Exhibition Hall Moscow Manege, Moscow
- 2015/16: Gathered Leaves, Media Space, Science Museum, London, 2015/16; The Finnish Museum of Photography, Helsinki, 2016/17, The Museum of Modern Art, Kamakura & Hayama, Japan, 2022
- 2020: Alec Soth: Photography is a Language, Kunst Haus Wien, Vienna

== Collections ==
Soth's work is held in the following public collections:

- Art Institute of Chicago, Chicago, IL: 3 prints
- Museum of Contemporary Photography, Chicago, IL: 6 prints (as of June 2018)
- Museum of Modern Art, New York: 1 print (as of June 2018)
- Pier 24 Photography, San Francisco, CA: 12 prints (as of June 2018)
- San Francisco Museum of Modern Art, San Francisco, CA: 14 prints (as of June 2018)
- Walker Art Center, Minneapolis, MN: 55 holdings (prints and books, as of June 2018)
- Whitney Museum of American Art, New York: 4 prints (as of June 2018)

== Awards ==
- 1999: McKnight Foundation Photography Fellowship, Minneapolis, MN.
- 2001: Travel and Study Grant, Jerome Foundation, for Sleeping by the Mississippi.
- 2001: Minneapolis College of Art and Design (MCAD) / Jerome Foundation Fellowships for Emerging Artists.
- 2003: Santa Fe Prize for Photography.
- 2004: McKnight Foundation Photography Fellowship, Minneapolis, MN.
- 2005: Art Works Residency Program, CEPA Gallery: Contemporary Photography & Visual Arts Center, Buffalo, NY. Whilst working on Niagara.
- 2006: Finalist, Deutsche Börse Photography Prize. A £3000 prize.
- 2008: Bush Fellowship, Bush Foundation, Saint Paul, MN. A $50000 grant.
- 2011: Infinity Award from International Center of Photography, Publication category, for From Here to There: Alec Soth's America.
- 2013: John Simon Guggenheim Fellowship in Photography from the John Simon Guggenheim Memorial Foundation.
- 2013: McKnight Foundation Photography Fellowship, Minneapolis, MN.
- 2014: Knight Arts Challenge grant from the John S. and James L. Knight Foundation An award of $35000 to create The Winnebago Workshop.
- 2021: Honorary Fellowship of the Royal Photographic Society, Bristol
