= Gregory Halpern =

American photographer and teacher (born 1977)

Gregory Halpern (born 1977) is an American photographer and teacher, living in Rochester, New York. He is a professor of photography at the Rochester Institute of Technology and is a full member of Magnum Photos. Halpern has published a number of books of his own work; Zzyzx won PhotoBook of the Year at the 2016 Paris Photo–Aperture Foundation PhotoBook Awards. He received a Guggenheim Fellowship in 2014.

== Early life and education ==
Halpern grew up in Buffalo, New York. He holds a BA in history and literature from Harvard University and an MFA from California College of the Arts.

== Life and work ==
Omaha Sketchbook (2009) is an artist's book portrait of the titular city. Harvard Works Because We Do (2003) is a book of photographs and text, presenting a portrait of Harvard University through the eyes of the school's service employees. A (2011) is a photographic ramble through the streets of the American Rust Belt. East of the Sun, West of the Moon (2014) is a collaboration with the photographer Ahndraya Parlato. Zzyzx (2016), named after Zzyzx, California, contains photographs from Los Angeles. Let the Sun Beheaded Be (2020) was made over several months in the French archipelago of Guadeloupe. King, Queen, Knave (2024) was made over 20 years visiting Halpern's home city of Buffalo, New York (again in the Rust Belt).

Halpern became a nominee member of Magnum Photos in 2018, an associate member two years later, and a full member in 2023. He has taught at California College of the Arts, Cornell University, School of the Museum of Fine Arts, Boston, Harvard University and the Harvard Graduate School of Design. He is currently a professor of photography at the Rochester Institute of Technology.

== Personal life ==
Halpern is married to Ahndraya Parlato, also a photographer. They live in Rochester, New York with their two daughters.

== Publications ==
=== Publications by Halpern ===
- Harvard Works Because We Do. New York: Quantuck Lane/W.W. Norton, 2003. With an introduction by Studs Terkel
- Omaha Sketchbook. J&L, 2009.
- A. J&L, 2011.
- Zzyzx. London: Mack, 2016.
- Confederate Moons. Oakland, CA: TBW, 2018. ISBN 978-1-942953-33-3. Annual Series 6, Book 3. Halpern, Guido Guidi, Jason Fulford, and Viviane Sassen each had one book in a set of four. Edition of 1000 copies.
- Let the Sun Beheaded Be. New York: Aperture, 2020. ISBN 978-1597114905.
- King, Queen, Knave. London: Mack, 2024. ISBN 978-1-913620-74-5.

=== Publications with others ===
- The Photographer's Playbook: 307 Assignments and Ideas. New York: Aperture, 2014. ISBN 978-1-59711-247-5. Edited by Halpern and Jason Fulford.
- East of the Sun, West of the Moon. Études Books N°8. Paris: Études, 2014. By Ahndraya Parlato and Halpern. ISBN 978-2-36962-003-7. With a text by Nicholas Muellner. Edition of 300 copies. In English and French.

== Awards ==
- 2014: Guggenheim Fellowship from the John Simon Guggenheim Memorial Foundation
- 2016: Zzyzx won PhotoBook of the Year, Paris Photo–Aperture Foundation PhotoBook Awards, Paris.
