= Leanne Shapton =

Canadian writer, designer and art director

- Born: June 25, 1973 (age 53) Mississauga, Ontario, Canada
- Area: Cartoonist

Leanne Shapton (born June 25, 1973) in Mississauga, Ontario is a Canadian artist and graphic novelist, now living in New York City. She is the art editor for the New York Review of Books. Her second work, Important Artifacts and Personal Property From the Collection of Lenore Doolan and Harold Morris, Including Books, Street Fashion and Jewelry, was optioned for a film slated to star Brad Pitt and Natalie Portman. The novel, which takes the form of an auction catalog, uses photographs and accompanying captions to chronicle the romance and subsequent breakup of a couple via the relationship's significant possessions or "artifacts".

Shapton's first work, Was She Pretty?, was a nominee for the Doug Wright Award, a Canadian award for comics and graphic novels, in 2007. It explored, via a series of line-drawn illustrations, the issues of relationship jealousy and insecurity as told through the imagined superior traits of the subjects' exes.

Shapton has been art director at newspapers and magazines. Formerly associated with Saturday Night, Maclean's and the National Post in Canada, she has worked as art director for the op-ed page at The New York Times. She has created hand lettering for a number of book covers, including Chuck Palahniuk's 2003 novel Diary. She is also a partner in J&L Books.

Her autobiographical book Swimming Studies (2012) deals with her youth as a national competitive swimmer, who made it as far as the 1988 and 1992 Canadian Olympic trials. It is a "meditation on the gruelling years of training, the ways swimming is refracted through her memory now". It won the National Book Critics Circle Award (Autobiography).

Shapton created the "armpit sex drawing" for Spike Jonze's 2013 film Her.

Guestbook, a collection of short writings and images, was published in 2019.
