= Todd Hido =

American photographer (born 1968)

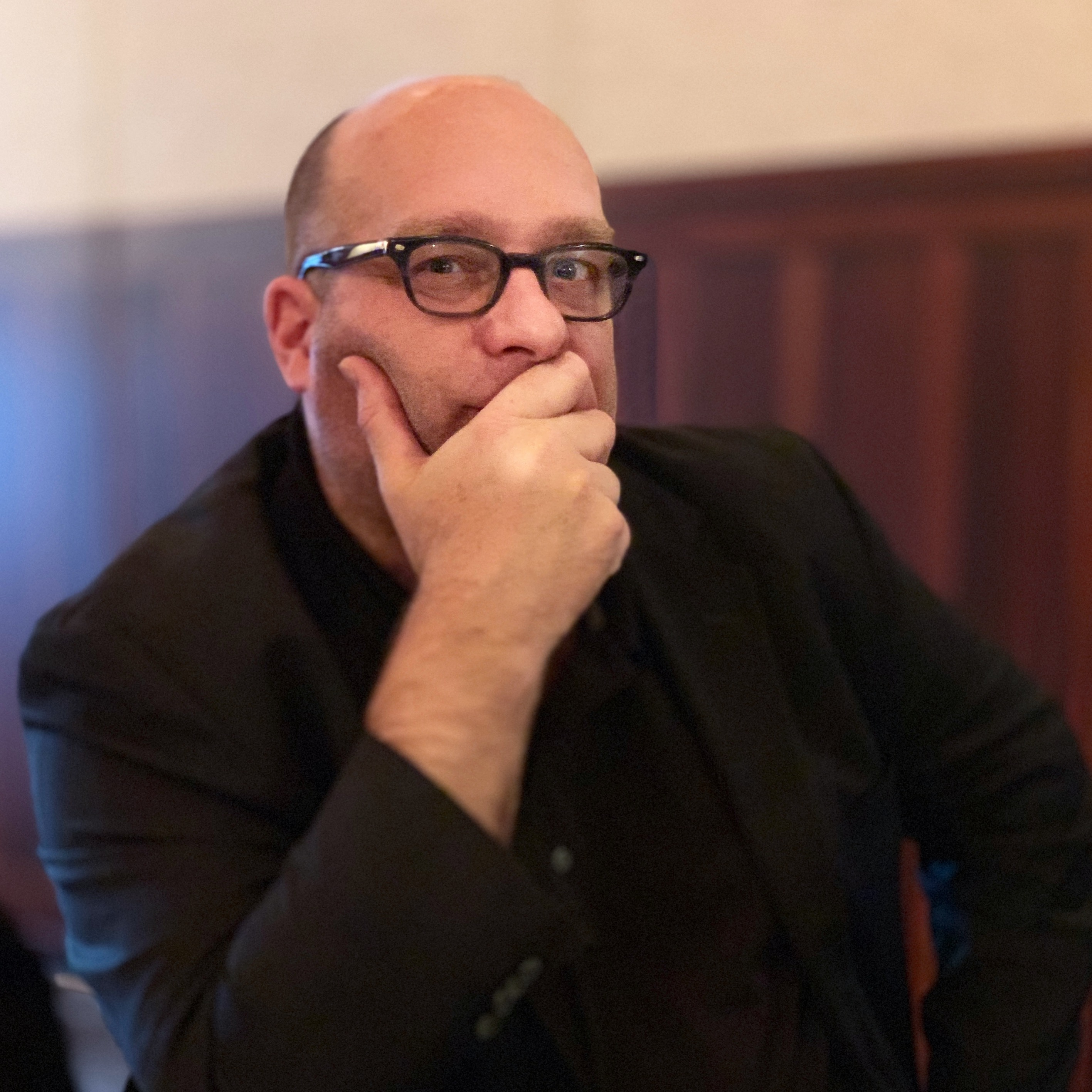
- Todd Hido, Montana, 2019
- Born: August 25, 1968 (age 58); Kent, Ohio, United States
- Known for: Photography
- Website: www.toddhido.com

Todd Hido (born 25 August 1968) is an American photographer. He has produced 17 books, had his work exhibited widely and included in various public collections. Hido is currently an adjunct professor at the California College of the Arts in San Francisco.

== Early life and education ==
Hido was born August 25, 1968, in Kent, Ohio, and graduated from Theodore Roosevelt High School in 1986. He graduated in 1991 with a B.F.A. from Tufts University, in Medford, Massachusetts and School of the Museum of Fine Arts, Boston. Between 1991 and 1992 he studied at Rhode Island School of Design, Providence, Rhode Island. In 1996 he gained an M.F.A. from California College of Arts and Crafts, Oakland, California. Among his professors was the photographer Larry Sultan, who later become his mentor.

== Life and work ==
Much of Hido's earlier work involves photographs of urban and suburban housing across the U.S.. Hido accidentally approached what would be one of his best-known themes, when driving at night on the West Coast, he started photographing houses in different neighborhoods. The houses often seemed isolated and had mostly in common the presence of a window with the light on. From this research it came his book House Hunting, published in 2001.

He then started to include figures, mostly female nudes in interiors, and also to depict rural landscapes. In 2006 he published the monograph Between The Two. Hido combines interior photos and portraits taken of models and actresses, maintaining an aesthetic similar to that of its first publication. Also in this book there are night shots of buildings. No text or description were inserted, so as to leave the viewer total freedom of interpretation. In 2018, he released Bright Black World, his first work photographed outside the U.S. with environmental overtones.

Hido says he is influenced by Alfred Hitchcock, Edward Hopper, Stephen Shore, Robert Adams, Walker Evans, Nan Goldin, Emmet Gowin, Larry Sultan, Alfred Stieglitz, Andreas Gursky and Rineke Dijkstra.

Commissioned by Italian brand Bottega Veneta, he photographed actress Lauren Hutton as well as models Joan Smalls and Vittoria Ceretti for the brand's spring/summer 2017 advertisements.

== Publications ==
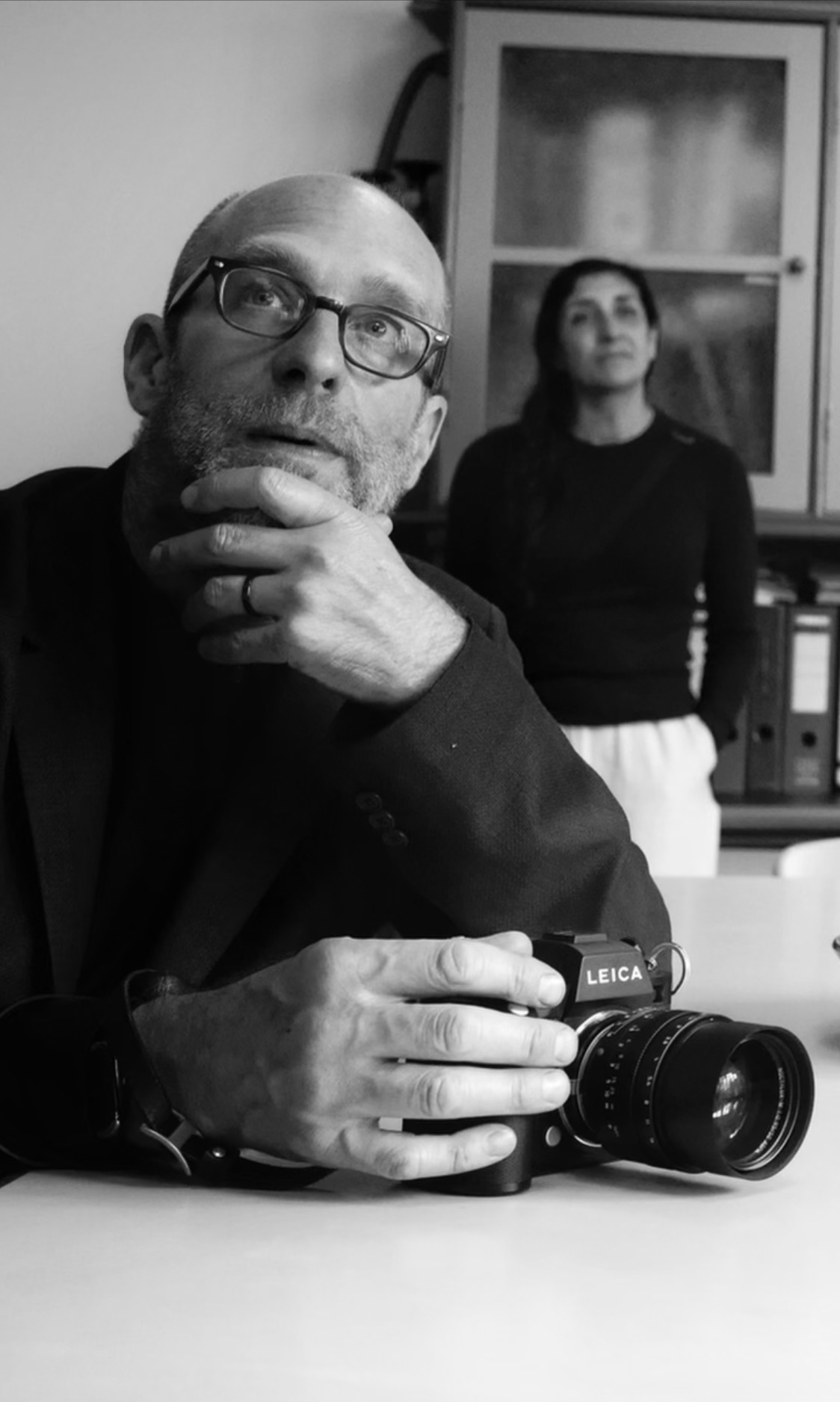
Hido in 2022

=== Publications by Hido ===
- House Hunting.
  - Portland, OR: Nazraeli, 2001. ISBN 978-3-923922-96-3.
  - Portland, OR: Nazraeli, 2007. ISBN 978-1-59005-193-1.
- Outskirts. Portland, OR: Nazraeli, 2002. ISBN 978-1-59005-028-6. Text by Lucy Sante. Edition of 2000 copies.
- Taft Street. One Picture Book 6. Portland, OR: Nazraeli, 2001. ISBN 978-1-59005-017-0.
- Roaming. Portland, OR: Nazraeli, 2004. ISBN 978-1-59005-095-8 Edition of 3000 copies.
- Between the Two. Portland, OR: Nazraeli, 2006. ISBN 978-1-59005-176-4. Edition of 2000 copies.
- Crooked Cracked Tree in Fog. One Picture Book 60. Portland, OR: Nazraeli, 2009. ISBN 978-1-59005-292-1. Edition of 500 copies.
- Ohio. TBW Subscription Series #2. Oakland, CA: TBW, 2009. ASIN B0087G1LD4. Edition of 800 copies. The other volumes are by Abner Nolan, Marianne Mueller and Alec Soth.
- A Road Divided. Portland, OR: Nazraeli, 2010. ISBN 978-1-59005-266-2.
- Nymph Daughters. Kamakura: Super Labo, 2010. ISBN 978-4-905052-01-2. Edition of 500 copies.
- Excerpts from Silver Meadows. Portland, OR: Nazraeli, 2013. ISBN 978-1-59005-368-3
- Todd Hido on Landscapes, Interiors, and the Nude. The Photography Workshop Series. New York: Aperture, 2014. ISBN 978-1-59711-297-0. With an introduction by Gregory Halpern.
- B-Sides – Silver Meadows. Portland, OR: Nazraeli, 2014. ASIN B00KP206DO. Edition of 500 copies. 50 individual cards in a clear plexi box, similar to a pack of playing cards.
- Khrystyna's World. Amsterdam: Reflex Amsterdam, 2015. ISBN 978-90-71848-22-3. Edition of 500 copies. Published on the occasion of the exhibition, Todd Hido: Selections from a Survey: Khrystyna's World, 2015, Reflex Amsterdam, Amsterdam. With an essay by Katya Tylevich, "Khrystyna's World: Detention in the Getaway Car". (Note: A PDF of the book can be viewed here within the Reflex Gallery website.)
- Seasons Road. One Picture Book 93. Portland, OR: Nazraeli, 2016. ISBN 978-1-59005-456-7. Edition of 500 copies. 7 colour plates and 1 photographic print. "Every year at Christmas for the past ten years, Todd Hido has traveled to Ohio to visit his parents. During his annual trip home, Hido makes photographs along the small road that serves as the namesake for this book."
- Intimate Distance: Twenty-five Years of Photographs, A Chronological Album. New York: Aperture, 2016. ISBN 978-1-59711-360-1. With an essay by David Campany.
- B-Sides Box Sets – Homing In. Oakland, CA: B-Sides Box Sets, 2017. ISBN 978-1-5323-5128-0. Edition of 2000 copies. 50 individual cards in a box. Previously unpublished photographs from House Hunting.
- Bright Black World. Paso Robles, CA: Nazraeli, 2018. ISBN 978-1-59005-475-8. Text by Alexander Nemerov.
- The End Sends Advance Warning. Paso Robles, CA: Nazraeli, 2023. ISBN 978-1-59005-595-3.

=== Smaller publications by Hido ===
- Collage Number Three. Deadbeat Club #41. Los Angeles, CA: Deadbeat Club, 2016. Edition of 500 copies. 8 page zine which folds out to form a poster.
- The Perfect Copy Vol. 1. San Francisco, CA: Colpa, 2016. Six 4-color Risograph photographic prints in screen printed envelope. Edition of 100 copies.

== Exhibitions ==
=== Solo ===
- SF Camerawork, San Francisco, CA, 1997
- Cleveland Museum of Art, Cleveland, Ohio, 2002
- Open House, Kemper Museum of Contemporary Art, 2002
- Roaming-New Landscapes, Julie Saul Gallery, 2004
- Unfinished Narratives, Photographic Center Northwest, Seattle, WA, 2006
- House Hunting + Bright Black World, part of Imago Festival, National Museum of Contemporary Art, Lisbon, Portugal, 2020

=== Group ===
- Light and Atmosphere, Miami Art Museum, FL, 2004/5
- Suburban Escape, San Jose Museum of Art, San Jose, CA, 2006/7. Work by Hido and 29 other photographers.
- Pier 24: The Inaugural Exhibition, Pier 24 Photography, San Francisco, CA, 2010
- Day & Night, Main Exhibition Copenhagen Photo Festival, Copenhagen, Denmark, 2010
- Here, Pier 24 Photography, San Francisco, CA, 2011/12
- About Face, Pier 24 Photography, San Francisco, CA, 2012/13
- A Sense of Place, Pier 24 Photography, San Francisco, CA, 2013/14
- The Open Road: Photography and the American Road Trip, Crystal Bridges Museum of American Art, Bentonville, AR, 2016. Curated by David Campany and Denise Wolff.
- Collected, Pier 24 Photography, San Francisco, CA, 2016/17

== Awards ==
- 1996: Barclay Simpson Award, California College of the Arts, CA. Joinet winner with Geoffrey Chadsey.
- 1998: The Wallace Alexander Gerbode Foundation, Visual Arts Award (Note: The Wallace Alexander Gerbode Foundation's "Special Awards Recipients 1987-Present" PDF here does not list Hido.)
- 2001: Eureka Fellowship, Fleishhacker Foundation
- 2002: Best First Monograph of 2001, Photo-Eye
- 2017: In Focus Artist selected by the National Portrait Gallery, London curators, an annual showcase for new work by an internationally renowned photographer

== Collections ==
Hido's work is held in the following permanent collections:

- Art Institute of Chicago, IL: 9 prints (as of 1 December 2024)
- Amon Carter Museum of American Art, Fort Worth, TX: 1 print (as of 1 December 2024)
- Berkeley Art Museum and Pacific Film Archive, Berkeley, CA
- Cleveland Museum of Art, Cleveland, OH
- Di rosa, Napa, CA
- George Eastman House, Rochester, NY: 6 prints
- Kemper Museum of Contemporary Art, Kansas City, MO: 2 prints (as of 1 December 2024)
- Los Angeles County Museum of Art, CA: 58 prints (as of 1 December 2024)
- Madison Museum of Contemporary Art, Madison, WI: 1 print (as of 2 December 2024)
- Museum of Contemporary Photography, Chicago, IL: 2 prints (as of 1 December 2024)
- Museum of Fine Arts, Boston, MA
- Museum of Fine Arts, Houston, TX: 3 prints (as of 1 December 2024)
- National Science and Media Museum, Bradford, UK: 2 prints
- New York Public Library, NY
- North Carolina Museum of Art, Raleigh, NC: 4 prints (as of 2 December 2024)
- San Francisco Museum of Modern Art, San Francisco, CA: 6 prints (as of 1 December 2024)
- Whitney Museum of American Art, NY: 6 prints (as of 1 December 2024)

== General references ==
- Berwick, Carly. Todd Hido: Julie Saul, ART news, November, pp. 153–154. 2004.
- Helfand, Glen (October 2001). "Todd Hido. (Stephen Wirtz)". Artforum International.
- Grundberg, Andy (May 1998). "House sitting: the photography of Todd Hido". Artforum. 36 (9). Archived from the original on May 16, 2010 – via FindArticles.
