= Walter Niedermayr =

Italian photographer and educator (born 1952)

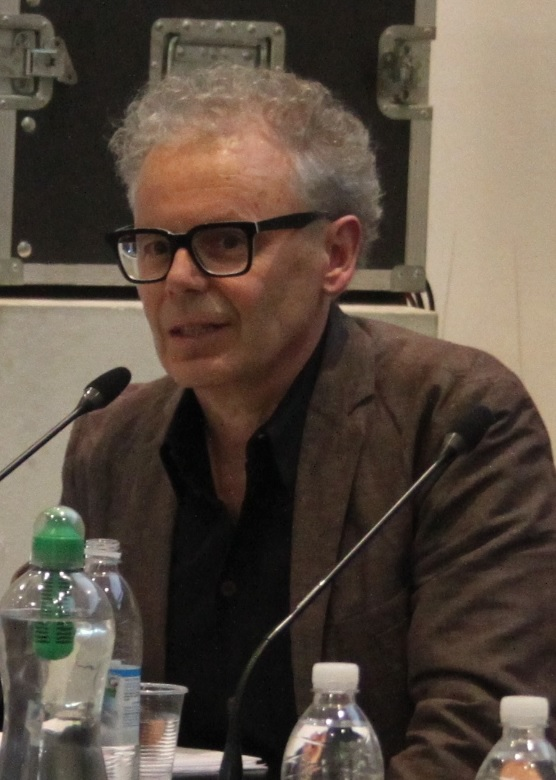
Walter Niedermayr (2015)

Walter Niedermayr (born 27 February 1952) is an Italian photographer and educator.

== Career ==
Niedermayr is mostly renowned for his photographs investigating the space as a reality occupied and shaped by people, questioning the ephemeral realms between representation and imagination. This body of work started in 1987 with the series Alpine Landschaften (Alpine Landscapes), and continued with Raumfolgen (Space Con / Sequences) (1991), Rohbauten (Shell Constructions) (1997) and Artefakte (Artifacts) (1992).

His series Bildraum (Image-Space) (2001) focuses on architecture, space and environment.

Between 2005 and 2008, he worked on the series Iran, while between 2009 and 2010, he worked on The Aspen Series in Colorado.

Between 2011 and 2014, Niedermayr taught fine-art photography at the Faculty of Design and Art at the Free University of Bozen-Bolzano in Bolzano.

== Selected solo exhibitions ==
- 2012: "Conjonctions", Istituto Italiano di Cultura de Paris, Paris
- 2015: "Walter Niedermayr. Projection Spheres and Adventure Realms", Month of Photography, Bratislava
- 2015: "Walter Niedermayr. Appearances", Ersel, Turin
- 2017: "Walter Niedermayr", Galerie Johann Widauer, Innsbruck

== Monographs ==
- Die bleichen Berge. I monti pallidi., Ar/Ge Kunst, Bozen, and Raetia, 1994. ISBN 978-88-7283-049-9
- Reservate des Augenblicks. Momentary resorts., Editors Francesco Bonami, Siegrid Hauser, Ar/Ge Kunst, Bozen, and Hatje Cantz, Ostfildern 1998. ISBN 978-3-89322-962-8
- Remixed. Niedermayr, Pauhof, Hauser, text Moritz Küng, ar/ge Kunst Galerie Museum, Bolzano 1998. ISBN 3-9500803-0-9
- Raumfolgen 1991–2001, texts by Martin Prinzhorn, Carl Aigner and Andrea Domesle, Eikon, Vienna, 2001. ISBN 978-3-9501157-9-6
- Walter Niedermayr | Zivile Operationen, Kunsthalle Wien/Hatje Cantz, Ostfildern, 2003. ISBN 978-3-7757-1260-6
- Walter Niedermayr | Titlis, Codax, Zürich 2004. ISBN 978-3-7757-1405-1
- Walter Niedermayr | TAV, Linea di Confine, Rubiera/Schlebrügge, Vienna 2006. ISBN 978-3-85160-078-0
- Novartis Campus-Fabrikstrasse, 4, Sanaa/Sejima+Nishizawa: Works by Walter Niedermayr, text by Ulrike Jehle-Schulte, Architekturmuseum Basel/Merian, 2006. ISBN 978-3-85616-519-2
- Walter Niedermayr | Kazuyo Sejima + Ryue Nishizawa / Sanaa, Editor Moritz Küng, DeSingel, Antwerp/Hatje Cantz, Ostfildern 2007. ISBN 978-3-7757-1890-5
- Station Z Sachsenhausen, Editors HG Merz + Walter Niedermayr, Publisher Hatje Cantz, Ostfildern 2009. ISBN 978-3-7757-2397-8
- Walter Niedermayr | Recollection, Editors Amir Cheheltan and Lars Mextorf, Hatje Cantz, Ostfildern 2010. ISBN 978-3-7757-2738-9
- Walter Niedermayr | Appearances, Editors Filippo Maggia and Francesca Lazzarini, Skira, Milan 2011. ISBN 978-88-572-0975-3
- Walter Niedermayr | Mose, Editor Tiziana Serena, Linea di Confine editore, Rubiera/Koenig Books, London 2011. ISBN 978-3-86560-395-1
- Walter Niedermayr – The Aspen Series, Texts by Chris Byrne, Catherine Grout, Paula Crown, Hatje Cantz, Ostfildern 2013, ISBN 978-3-7757-3212-3.
- Walter Niedermayr | Raumaneignungen. Lech 2015–2016, Text by Catherine Grout and a conversation between Gerold and Katia Schneider, Walter Niedermayr and Arno Ritter, Ostfildern 2016, ISBN 978-3-7757-4266-5.
