= Krakow Photomonth =

Polish photography festival

Krakow Photomonth is a photography festival in Kraków, Poland, organised by the Foundation for Visual Arts, that was established in 2001. Until 2022, it was an annual event, after which, it is to be a biennial event held in even years. It is usually held for a month from the end of May until the end of June.

== Description ==
The festival has for example had a main programme of four key exhibitions under a loose theme. It has held exhibitions at venues ranging from major art museums to small cafes and eateries. The main programme has included portfolio reviews by Polish and international critics, artists and publishers, as well as workshops, film screenings, book launches, and discussions. A section presents new projects by emerging photographers. The Krakow Photo Fringe adds satellite exhibitions and events dotted around the city centre.

== Editions ==
- 2011 – main programme curated by Adam Broomberg and Oliver Chanarin
- 2012 – the Experimental Section was curated by Charlotte Cotton
- 2013
- 2014 – main programme curated by Aaron Schuman. Beginning in 2014, there was a professional guest curator.
- 2015 – main programme curated by Wojciech Nowicki
- 2016 – main programme curated by Lars Willumeit
- 2017 – main programme curated by Gordon MacDonald
- 2018 – main programme curated by Iris Sikking
- 2019 – main programme curated collectively
