= Yve Lomax =

British visual artist and writer

- Born: 18 December 1952 (age 73); Poole, Dorset, UK
- Education: St Martins School of Art, London: 1971-72, Fine Art, Foundation; 1972-74 Fine Art, Painting. Royal College of Art, Environmental Media, 1977-79
- Occupations: Visual artist, writer, editor
- Years active: 1979-present
- Known for: Art writing, spoken performance, feminist theory

Yve Lomax (born 18 December 1952) is a British visual artist, writer and theorist who is interested in feminism and the photographic image. Since the late 1970s she has exhibited nationally and internationally; her first book of collected writings was published in 2000 under the title of Writing the image: an adventure with art and theory. She is a founder member of Copy Press publishers and its Reader's Union.

== Life, education and career ==
In the early 1970s, Lomax studied Fine Art at St Martins School of Art, now Central St Martins (UAL). In 1979 she completed her postgraduate studies in Environmental Media at the Royal College of Art. From the late 1980s Lomax teaches both theory and practice in a variety of art colleges in London. She was a Senior Research Tutor in Photography at the Royal College of Art (2001–18).

== Work ==
=== Spoken performance ===
Lomax has produced voice and spoken performances including: Political Life, 2021; From intimacy without relation to demand: rhythmos, 2018; You are looking at something that never occurred — event, example: photographic image, 2017; Examples, species, figures, 2014; Word, problem, figure, 2013; Beginning, ends and middles, 2011.

=== Book editing ===
In 1999 Lomax developed a seminar series at the Royal College of Art, which was published in two pocket size volumes as Images of Thought (2000) which she edited. From 2013, she worked as an editor for Copy Press, Common Intellectual, titles include, Revisiting the Bonaventura Hotel, Jaspar Joseph-Lester (2013) ISBN 978-0-9553792-5-3; Paris, Michael Schwab (2013) ISBN 978-0-9553792-4-6; Falling, Kreider+O’Leary (2015) ISBN 978-1-909570-01-6; Ha Ha Crystal, Chris Fite-Wassilak (2016) ISBN 978-1-909570-03-0; Unearthed, Yvette Gresle (2019) ISBN 978-1-909570-06-1; Murmurations, Vanessa Jackson (2022) ISBN 978-1-909570-08-5

== Exhibitions ==
Lomax's work was included in the show Three Perspectives on Photography ‘Feminism and Photography’ curated by Angela Kelly, Hayward Gallery, London, 1979, with Arts Council publication and contribution: Some stories which I have heard: some questions which I have asked, pp 52–55 ISBN 0-7287-0195-2. From the early 80s to the late 90s, Lomax exhibited photographically based work in group shows:

- Her work, Open Rings and Partial Lines, (1983–1985), was shown in the group show Sense and Sensibility: In Feminist Art Practice, at the Midland Group, Nottingham, 1982; and in the On Difference: On Representation and Sexuality show, at The New Museum of Contemporary Art, New York, 1984–5; the show then travelled to The Renaissance Society at the University of Chicago Illinois, ICA London.
- Her work, Divergent Series (The world is a fabulous tale), (1985–1989) was shown in the group show, Re-visions: Fringe interference in British Photography in the 1980s, at Cambridge Darkrooms, 1985; the show travelled to the John Hansard Gallery, Southampton. Questioning Europe, Fotografie Biennale Rotterdam, 1988; Shifting Focus, curated by Susan Butler, Arnolfini Gallery Bristol, Serpentine Gallery London, 1989; Divergent Series (The World is a Fabulous Tale), Photographer's Gallery London 1989 (solo). 3rd Israeli Photography Biennale, at the, Museum of Art Ein-Harod, 1991.
- Her work, Sometime(s), (1991–1995) was shown at the 1st Johannesburg Biennale South Africa, (OVA), 1995; and was also exhibited as a solo exhibition at Camera Austria, Graz; Zone Gallery, Newcastle; Montage Gallery, Derby; Portfolio Gallery, Edinburgh, 1995.

== Film work ==
In 2021 Lomax released her first film work, Political Life (55 mins); in the supporting personal notes she details her approach to the making of this film.
