= Adama Jalloh =

British photographer (born 1993)

- Born: 1993 (age 32–33)
- Education: Arts University Bournemouth
- Occupation: Photographer
- Known for: Portraiture and documentary photography
- Awards: British Journal of Photography Breakthrough Award
- Website: www.adamajalloh.co.uk

Adama Jalloh (born 1993) is a British photographer of Sierra Leonean heritage whose work has been exhibited at Tate Modern and the V&A Museum. She specialises in portraiture and documentary photography.

== Early life and education ==
Jalloh was born in 1993 to Sierra Leonean parents and is based in London, England. She has a BA degree in commercial photography from the Arts University Bournemouth, and won the British Journal of Photography Breakthrough Award for a single image by an undergraduate in 2015.

== Career ==
Jalloh's work has been included in exhibitions including After Hours: Soul of A Nation (2015) at Tate Modern, London (featuring her commission "Familiar Faces"); Celebration of African Female Photographers (2018) at Nubuke Foundation, Accra, Ghana; No Place Like Home Friday Late (2019), V&A Museum, London (which exhibited her project "Love Story"); and Bamako Encounters - African Biennale of Photography (2019), Mali.

From October 2020 to September 2021, the Horniman Museum in London hosted the exhibition An Ode To Afrosurrealism comprising photographs by Jalloh and Hamed Maiye.

Jalloh has undertaken commissions from publications and organizations including Alexander McQueen. In the area of music, she has portrayed artists including Zara McFarlane, Yussef Kamaal, Shabaka Hutchings, Little Simz, Freddie Gibbs, and Mr Eazi.

Jalloh's photograph of Selma Blair was the cover image of the May 2023 issue of Vogue Germany, the German edition of Vogue.
