= Shopsin's =

New York City diner

Coordinates: 40.71894°N 73.98780°W

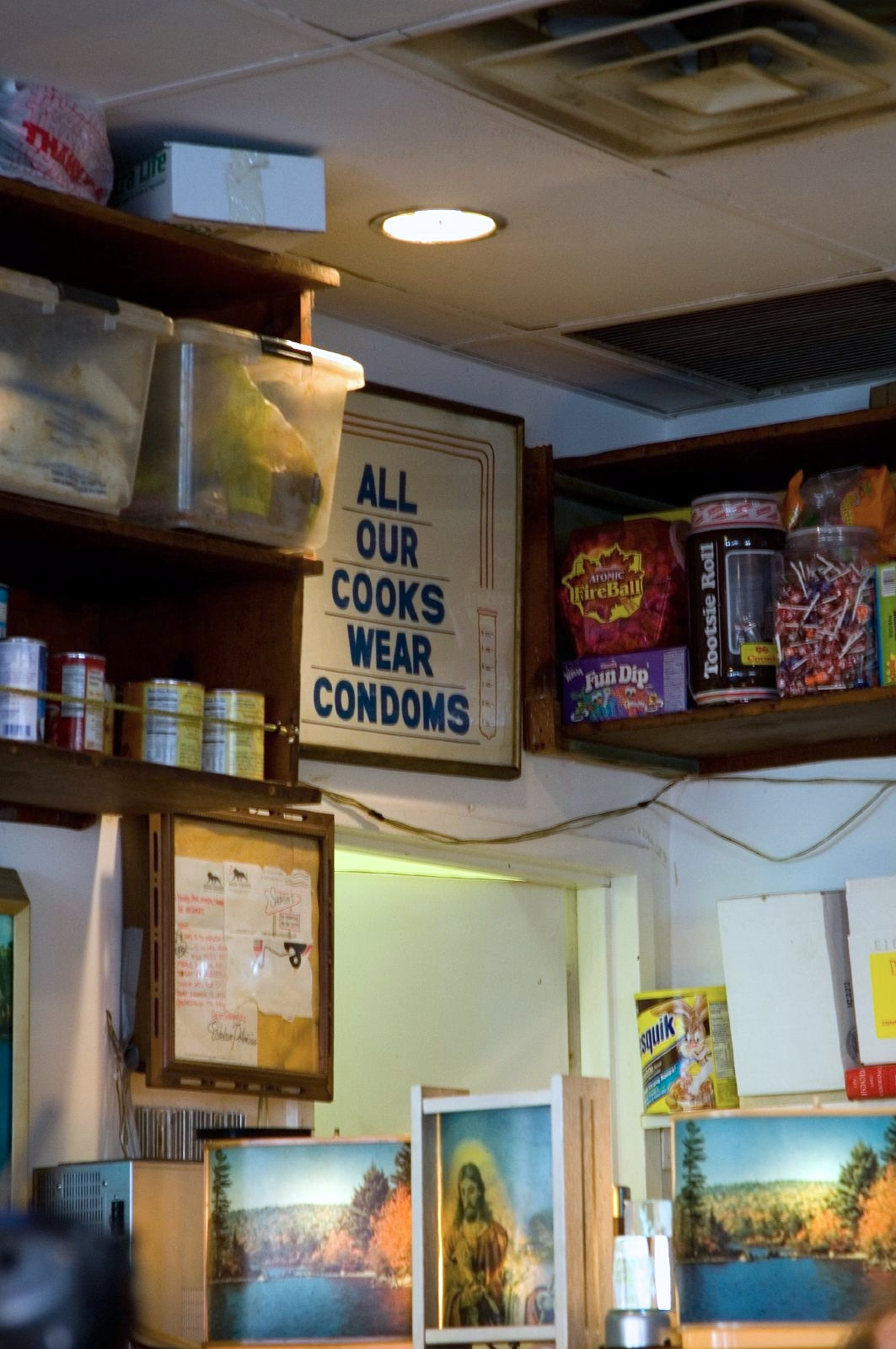
- Interior of Shopsin's Greenwich Village location, 2006
- Interactive map of Shopsin's

Restaurant information
- Established: 1973; 53 years ago
- Owners: Melinda Shopsin, Tamara Shopsin, Zack Shopsin
- Food type: Diner, eclectic
- Location: Essex Market, 88 Essex St, New York City, New York, 10002, United States
- Website: shopsins.com

Shopsin's General Store is a diner in New York City, known for its extensive menu and the personality of its namesake chef/owner, Kenny Shopsin. It first opened in the 1970s in the city's Greenwich Village neighborhood, but is now located in Essex Market on the Lower East Side.

Shopsin's was the subject of the documentary I Like Killing Flies.

== Neighborhood grocery ==
Shopsin's first iteration was as a neighborhood grocery at the corner of Bedford Street and Morton Street in Greenwich Village. It, the stock and good will, but not the building, was purchased by Kenny Shopsin for $25,000 in 1973, using money from his father. The previous owner had prepared and sold roast beef, a practice Shopsin continued.

== The restaurant ==
The original Shopsin's restaurant, located at 63 Bedford Street in Greenwich Village, was known for both its extensive (900-item) menu of unusual dishes concocted by chef/owner Kenny Shopsin, including items such as "Slutty Cakes", pancakes with peanut butter in the middle, and "Blisters on My Sisters", similar to huevos rancheros, and for Kenny Shopsin himself, described by Time Out New York as "the foul-mouthed middle-aged chef and owner". Among Shopsin's quirks were his specific rules, including that the restaurant would not accept parties of more than four people. "Pretending to be a party of three that happened to have come in with a party of two is a very bad idea," wrote journalist and regular customer Calvin Trillin. Due to a lease dispute, Shopsin's restaurant moved from its Bedford Street location in 2002 to 54 Carmine Street. In 2008, the restaurant moved yet again to the Essex Market at 120 Essex Street. An Essex Crossing redevelopment in 2019 relocated Shopin's to 88 Essex Street, where it resides today.

The restaurant and Shopsin were the subject of articles in The New Yorker by Trillin, and of the documentary film I Like Killing Flies, directed by Matt Mahurin. An effort to re-create Shopsin's "Slutty Cakes" was described in a 2009 Slate article.

In 2008, Shopsin wrote a cookbook, Eat Me: The Food and Philosophy of Kenny Shopsin.

In 2017, one of Shopsin's daughters, Tamara Shopsin, published a memoir, Arbitrary Stupid Goal, about her father, his friend Willy, and growing up at the restaurant.

Kenny Shopsin died on September 2, 2018, at his home in the West Village.

== See also ==
- List of restaurants in New York City
