= Jerwood Space =

Arts venue in Southwark, London

Coordinates: 51°30′13″N 0°5′55″W

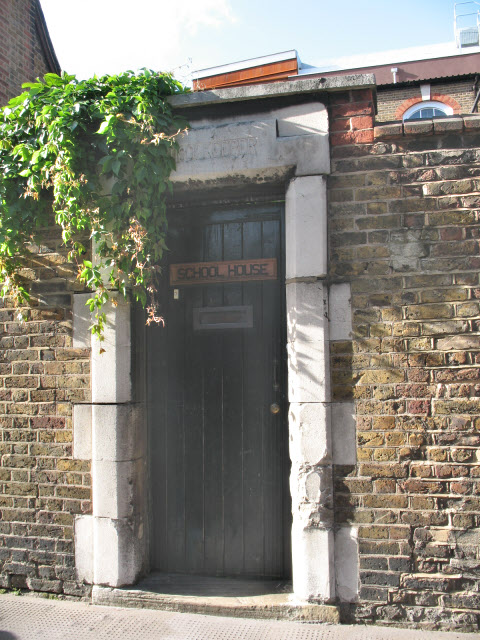
An entrance to the Jerwood Space

Jerwood Space is an arts venue at Bankside on Union Street, Southwark, London. The facilities include rehearsal studios, gallery/exhibition space, meeting rooms, a café, etc. Exhibits include contemporary art and photography throughout the building.

The formal foundation stone for the building was laid by Chris Smith, now Lord Smith of Finsbury, when he was Secretary of State for Culture. Pete Wilkinson has been Director since 2014.

Jerwood Arts, an independent funder dedicated to supporting UK artists, curators and producers curates and delivers a year-round programme of exhibitions and events at Jerwood Space and on tour nationally. Exhibitions at Jerwood Space are accompanied by regular events featuring writers, artists and academics, they additionally host three Writers in Residence each year. Significant Jerwood Arts exhibitions and awards include: Jerwood Makers Open, Awards and Jerwood Solo Presentations.

== See also ==
- Jerwood Foundation
