= Doug Rickard (photographer) =

American artist and photographer (1968–2021)

Doug Rickard (May 27, 1968 – November 30, 2021) was an American artist and photographer. (Note: Critics are divided on whether to consider him an artist or a photographer. Rickard described himself as "an artist working with digital technologies".) He used technologies such as Google Street View and YouTube to find images, which he then photographed on his computer monitor. His photography has been published in books, exhibited in galleries and held in the permanent collection of the San Francisco Museum of Modern Art. Rickard was best known for his book A New American Picture (2010). He was the founder and publisher of the website on contemporary photography, American Suburb X, and the website These Americans which published some of his collection of found photographs.

== Life and work ==
Rickard was born in San Jose, California and brought up in Los Gatos in the San Francisco Bay Area. His father was a prominent pastor and many family members were preachers and missionaries, with a "very Reaganesque, patriotic view of America", a country "special and unique". Rickard studied United States history—slavery, civil rights—and sociology, at University of California, San Diego, and "lost his faith in this family vision. His adult view of America was a land not just of great achievement but also of massive injustice." At age 12 he witnessed his father having a secret extramarital affair, which he confessed to his congregation years later in 1988. Rickard said this experience prompted him "to look for the fault lines in the American dream." He took the firm position that art did not need to be edifying, saying, "I don't think I'll be chasing any happy endings with the work I do."

He lived in Shingle Springs, near Sacramento, California.

Rickard was founder and publisher of the website on contemporary photography American Suburb X, which the British Journal of Photography considers "influential"; and the website These Americans, which published some of his collection of found photographs.

His most noteworthy books are A New American Picture (2010, 2012) and N.A. (2013, 2014).

=== A New American Picture ===
For his series A New American Picture, Rickard "wanted to look at the state of the country in these areas where opportunity is non-existent and where everything is broken down", where "the American dream was shattered or impossible to achieve". It is said that this work comments on United States politics, poverty, racial equality and the socioeconomic climate, class; the use of technology in art, privacy, surveillance, and the large quantity of images on the web. Rickard said A New American Picture was about America and not about Google Street View.

He began work on A New American Picture in 2008, whilst working a day job in software sales at Cisco Systems. Rickard was at his computer nightly for over three years, taking 10,000 to 15,000 photographs, choosing about 80 for the series. He used a digital camera on a tripod to photograph a dedicated screen that mirrored a second screen that he used to navigate. He digitally manipulated the images to remove Google's watermark and crop extraneous information, resulting in a wide image from the wide screen computer monitor.

He cited as influences the photobooks American Photographs (1938) by Walker Evans, The Americans (1958) by Robert Frank, Uncommon Places (1982) by Stephen Shore and American Night (2003) by Paul Graham.

The work was first exhibited as part of Anonymes: Unnamed American in Photography and Film, curated by David Campany and Diane Dufour at Le Bal, Paris, in 2010. To mark that occasion Rickard produced the first edition of the book, with the publisher White Press. Its first American museum show was at New York's Museum of Modern Art in 2011.

Parr and Badger include the book in the third volume of their photobook history.

=== N.A. ===
N.A. is a body of work photographed from YouTube videos, which he began working with in 2008 to 2009. The series portrays scenes of violence and crime in urban settings, often filmed on mobile devices. The title of the work is meant to be National Anthem, but is a deliberate reference and double meaning for 'N/A' (Not Applicable) as appears on forms, to signify that he considers many of the people depicted in the series are marginalized. "I came to the understanding pretty quickly that social media and the internet put into place a real predatory dynamic, where basically it motivated people to take video of other people to put up on YouTube to get shares, likes or comments."

== Death ==
Rickard died on November 30, 2021.

== Publications ==
=== Books of work by Rickard ===
- A New American Picture.
  - Cologne: White / Schaden, 2010. Edition of 200 copies. With text by Rickard and Helge Schlaghecke. Includes 69 photographs.
  - Larger format, expanded edition. New York: Aperture; Berlin: Koenig, 2012. ISBN 978-1-59711-219-2. With an introductory essay by David Campany, "In the Frame", and a transcript of a conversation between Rickard and Erin O'Toole. Includes 79 photographs.
- Tom. Los Angeles: Little Big Man, 2013. Edition of 300 copies.
- All Eyes on me. One Picture Book 86. Portland, OR: Nazraeli, 2014. ISBN 9781590054154. Edition of 500 copies.
- Patriot Act. London: Wild Life, 2014. OCLC 911411734.
- N.A.
  - Cologne: White, 2013. Edition of 200 copies.
  - Dortmund: Kettler; New York: Distributed Art Publishers, 2014. English-language version, ISBN 978-1938922626; German-language version, ISBN 978-3-86206-345-1. With a text by Zaha Redman and a poem by Ann Garlid.

=== Books with others ===
- Aperture Remix. New York: Aperture, 2012. A series of books made in homage to another Aperture publication, each in an edition of 5 copies. Rickard's was a response to Uncommon Places by Stephen Shore. The other publications were by Rinko Kawauchi, Vik Muniz, Alec Soth, Taiyo Onorato & Nico Krebs, Martin Parr, Viviane Sassen, Penelope Umbrico and James Welling. Produced in conjunction with the exhibition Aperture Remix.
- A New American Picture. Nazraeli Press Six by Six, set 4 v. 5. Portland, OR: Nazraeli, 2012. ISBN 9781590053607. Edition of 100 copies. The other volumes are by Robert and Kerstin Adams, Edward Burtynsky, Kenro Izu, Catherine Opie and Issei Suda.
- Staking Claim: a California Invitational. San Francisco: Modernbook, 2013. OCLC 867793604. With a foreword by Deborah Klochko and essays by Chantel Paul ("Garden State") and Colin Westerbeck ("All together now! Themes and Shared Concerns in Staking Claim: a California Invitational"). Photographs by Rickard as well as Matthew Brandt, Susan Burnstine, Eric William Carroll, John Chiara, Chris Engman, Robbert Flick, Todd Hido, Siri Kaur, Mona Kuhn, Matt Lipps, David Maisel, Klea McKenna, Mark Ruwedel, Paul Schiek and Christina Seely. Catalogue of an exhibition held at the Museum of Photographic Arts, San Diego, CA.
- The World Atlas of Street Photography. New Haven and London: Yale University: 2014, ISBN 978-0-300-20716-3. Edited by Jackie Higgins. With a foreword by Max Kozloff.

== Exhibitions ==
=== Solo exhibitions ===
- 2012: Yossi Milo Gallery, New York, 2012

=== Exhibitions with others ===
- 2010: Anonymes: L'Amérique sans nom: Photographie et Cinéma (Anonymous: Unnamed America in Photography and Film), Le Bal, Paris, 2010 A thematic exhibition with works by Rickard as well as Jeff Wall, Walker Evans, Chauncey Hare, Lewis Baltz, Standish Lawder, Sharon Lockhart, Anthony Hernandez, Arianna Arcara & Luca Santese, and Bruce Gilden. Curated by Diane Dufour and David Campany.
- 2011/2012: New Photography 2011, Museum of Modern Art, New York, 2011/12. Photographs by Rickard and Moyra Davey, George Georgiou, Deana Lawson, Viviane Sassen and Zhang Dali.
- 2012: Publicly Private: Enrico Natali and Doug Rickard, Santa Barbara Museum of Art, Santa Barbara, CA, 2012. Enrico Natali's New York Subway 1960 and Rickard's A New American Picture. Curated by Karen Sinsheimer.
- 2012: Aperture Remix, Aperture Gallery, New York, 2012 Curated by Lesley A. Martin with work by Rickard as well as Rinko Kawauchi, Vik Muniz, Alec Soth, Taiyo Onorato & Nico Krebs, Martin Parr, Viviane Sassen, Penelope Umbrico and James Welling. Toured to David Owsley Museum of Art Ball State University, Muncie, IN, 2014; Museum of Photographic Arts, San Diego, CA, 2014
- 2013: Tim Hetherington and Doug Rickard, Stills Gallery, Sydney, 2013. Rickard's A New American Picture was shown alongside Tim Hetherington's Afghanistan.
- 2013/14: Staking Claim: a California Invitational, Museum of Photographic Arts, San Diego, CA, 2013/14.

== Collections ==
Rickard's work is held in the following permanent collections:

- Frances Lehman Loeb Art Center, Vassar College, Poughkeepsie, NY
- Harry Ransom Center, University of Texas at Austin, Austin, TX
- Museum of Contemporary Photography, Columbia College Chicago, IL
- Museum of Fine Arts, Houston, TX
- Museum of Modern Art, New York
- Nelson-Atkins Museum of Art, Kansas City, MO
- New York Public Library, New York, NY
- San Francisco Museum of Modern Art, San Francisco, CA
- Yale University Art Gallery, New Haven, CT

== See also ==
- Mishka Henner
- Jon Rafman
- Michael Wolf
