= Éditions Xavier Barral =

- Status: Active
- Founded: 2002
- Founder: Xavier Barral
- Country of origin: France
- Headquarters location: 42 rue Sedaine, 75 011 Paris, France
- Publication types: Books
- Nonfiction topics: Photography, architecture, contemporary art, science
- Official website: exb.fr

Éditions Xavier Barral is a French book publisher specialising in photography, architecture, contemporary art and science. It was founded in 2002 by Xavier Barral and based in Paris.

Martin Parr has said of Éditions Xavier Barral that "Every book published [by] Barral has a specific problem to which it brings an original solution tailored to this project and to no other". Cheryl Newman, writing in The Daily Telegraph in 2013, described it as "offering an irresistible collection of tomes".

== Awards ==
- 2013: Antoine D'Agata's Anticorps (Xavier Barral and Le Bal, 2013), won the Rencontres d'Arles Author’s Book Award.
- 2015: Images of Conviction: The Construction of Visual Evidence (Xavier Barral and Le Bal, 2015) won Photography Catalogue of the Year, Paris Photo–Aperture Foundation PhotoBook Awards.

== People published by Éditions Xavier Barral ==
- Damarice Amao
- Jane Evelyn Atwood
- Jean-Christophe Bailly
- Quentin Bajac
- Xavier Barral
- Barthe Christine
- Lothar Baumgarten
- Philippe Beaussant
- Michel Bettane
- Leendert Blok
- Anna and Bernhard Blume
- Thierry Bouët
- Guy Bourdin
- Dirk Braeckman
- Frédéric Bruly Bouabré
- Daniel Buren
- Roger Caillois
- Sophie Calle
- Claudia Cardinale
- Philippe Chancel
- Anne Chapman
- Yvane Chapuis
- Clément Chéroux
- Jean-François Chevrier
- Gilles Clément
- Mark Cohen
- Annie Cohen-Solal
- Anton Corbijn
- André Courrèges
- Pascal Cribier
- Jean-Pierre Criqui
- Thibaut Cuisset
- Giuseppe Culicchia
- Olivier Culmann
- Antoine D'Agata
- Raphaël Dallaporta
- Dominique Darbois
- Pierre de Fenoÿl
- Jean-Baptiste de Panafieu
- Gilles de Rapper
- Luc Delahaye
- Cédric Delsaux
- Marc Deneyer
- Raymond Depardon
- Jean-Paul Desroches
- Desiree Dolron
- Diane Dufour
- Anouck Durand
- Alfred Ehrhardt
- Denis Escudier
- Patrick Faigenbaum
- François Farges
- Andreas Fischer
- Masahisa Fukase
- Jean Gaumy
- Emmet Gowin
- Patrick Gries
- Benedict Gross
- Harry Gruyaert
- Martin Gusinde
- Simon Hantaï
- Thomas Hirschhorn
- Michel Houellebecq
- Pieter Hugo
- Ryoji Ikeda
- Florence Inoué
- Manuel Joseph
- Wong Kar-wai
- Rinko Kawauchi
- William Kentridge
- Darius Khondji
- Jeff Koons
- Josef Koudelka
- Irene Küng
- Sergio Larrain
- Bernard Le Bars
- Laurent Le Bon
- Dominique Legoupil
- Gonzalo Leiva Quijada
- Annette Lucas
- David Lynch
- Danny Lyon
- André Magnin
- Nicolas Mangold
- Alberto Manguel
- Laurent Mannoni
- Jean-Hubert Martin
- Francisca Mattéoli
- Alfred McEwen
- Annette Messager
- Glenn Mitchell
- Santu Mofokeng
- Gwénaël Morin
- Zanele Muholi
- Takashi Murakami
- Claudine Nougaret
- Jean Nouvel
- Cedric Nunn
- Erik Orsenna
- Marisol Palma Behnke
- Martin Parr
- Pier Paolo Pasolini
- Alain Passard
- Ad Petersen
- Roland Pilloni
- Gueorgui Pinkhassov
- Jean-Robert Pitte
- Bernard Plossu
- Jean-Claude Pondevie
- David Poullard
- Ludovico Pratesi
- Angelin Preljocaj
- Francine Prose
- Guillaume Rannou
- Jo Ratcliffe
- Eric Reinhardt
- Jean-Michel Ribes
- Marc Riboud
- Rudy Ricciotti
- Francis Rocard
- Stéphanie Salmon
- Willem Sandberg
- Carole Sandrin
- Yaya Savané
- Paul Scheerbart
- Philippe Séclier
- Thabiso Sekgala
- Michel Serres
- George Shiras
- Stephen Shore
- Agnès Sire
- Franck Sorbier
- Norman Spinrad
- Sam Stourdzé
- Hiroshi Sugimoto
- Yuriko Takagi
- Patrick Tourneboeuf
- Stéphane Trapier
- Valode & Pistre
- Ina Van Zyl
- Agnès Varda
- Felice Varini
- Fabienne Verdier
- Dimitri Verhulst
- Sonia Voss
- Jeff Wall
- Yūkichi Watabe
- Alain Willaume
- Patrick Zachmann
- Karolina Ziebinska-Lewandowska
