= Le Bal (arts centre) =

Arts centre in Paris, France

- Location: 6 Impasse de la Défense, 18th arrondissement, 75018, Paris
- Key people: Diane Dufour
- Website: en.le-bal.com

Le Bal is an independent arts centre in Paris. It focuses on documentary photography, video, cinema and new media through exhibitions, production, book publishing, talks and debates.

Le Bal has around 350 m² of exhibition space divided across two floors; a bookshop, Le Bal Books; and café, Le Bal Café. It is located off Place de Clichy at 6 Impasse de la Défense, 18th arrondissement, 75018, Paris. It opened in September 2010. Its director is Diane Dufour (who was European Director of Magnum Photos from 2000 to 2006).

== Details ==
The building is a former 1930s dance hall called Chez Isis.

Le Bal co-publishes two or three books each year, including L’Anti-collection, a limited-edition artist’s book which it jointly publishes with the Centre national des arts plastiques, and Les Carnets du Bal.

Le Bal’s educational platform, La Fabrique du Regard, has run programmes since 2008 for young people aged 8–18, especially from disadvantaged areas of Paris and its suburbs, to critically look at images.

Le Bal Books is run by Sébastian Hau.

Le Bal Café is operated by Alice Quillet, Anna Trattles and Anselme Blayney. It serves a French take on traditional British cuisine.

Since 2010 Le Bal has been involved with the annual Prix des Ecoles d’Art SFR Jeunes Talents / Le Bal (The SFR / Le Bal award for young photography with ADAGP). (Note: ADAGP is Société des Auteurs dans les Arts Graphiques et Plastiques; SFR is Société française du radiotéléphone) It is a competition open to art school students and former students who graduated less than three years before entering. It carries a 5000 Euro prize intended to support the winner for two years in making or completing a documentary photography project.

Antoine D'Agata's Anticorps (2013), a catalogue published by Le Bal and Éditions Xavier Barral for his retrospective at Le Bal, won the Rencontres d'Arles Author’s Book Award in 2013. In 2015, the book Images of Conviction: The Construction of Visual Evidence (Xavier Barral and Le Bal, 2015) won the Photography Catalogue of the Year award in the Paris Photo–Aperture Foundation PhotoBook Awards.

== Exhibitions ==
- Anonymes: L’Amérique sans nom: Photographie et Cinéma (Anonymous: Unnamed America in Photography and Film), September–December 2010. A thematic exhibition with works by Jeff Wall, Walker Evans, Chauncey Hare, Lewis Baltz, Standish Lawder, Sharon Lockhart, Doug Rickard, Anthony Hernandez, Arianna Arcara & Luca Santese, and Bruce Gilden. Curated by Diane Dufour and David Campany. Held in association with Mois de la Photo, Paris.
- Foto/Gráfica: a New History of the Latin-American Photobook, January - April 2012. Curated by Horacio Fernandez.
- Northern Ireland (1970-1990): Gilles Peress, May–August 2012. Curated by Gilles Peress and Diane Dufour.
- Chris Killip: What Happened: Great Britain 1970-1990 (originated at Museum Folkwang in Essen, Germany) and John Smith: The Girl Chewing Gum (1976), May–August 2012.
- Antoine D'Agata: Anticorps, January–April 2013. Also shown at Fotomuseum Den Haag, May–September 2012; Spazio Forma, Milan, June–September 2013; and Atsukobarouh, Tokyo, May–July 2015.
- Mark Cohen: Dark Knees (1969 - 2012), September–December 2013. Curated by Diane Dufour. Toured to Netherlands Photo Museum, Rotterdam, November 2014 – January 2015.
- Young Photographers at Le Bal, by Sylvain Couzinet-Jacques, Óscar Monzón, Ricardo Cases, Aleix Plademunt and Antonio M. Xoubanova, December 2013 – January 2014.
- Kourtney Roy: Ils Pensent Déjà que je Suis Folle (They Already Think I’m Crazy), April–May 2014. A series for Carte Blanche PMU 2013 (award for young photographers). (Note: PMU, Pari mutuel urbain, is the French state-controlled betting system.)
- Lewis Baltz: Common Objects, May–August 2014.
- S’il y a Lieu je Pars Avec Vous, by Sophie Calle, Julien Magre, Stéphane Couturier, Alain Bublex and Antoine D'Agata, September–October 2014.
- Dirk Braeckman, November 2014 – January 2015.
- Léa Habourdin et Thibault Brunet: Les Immobiles. January 2015. A series for Carte Blanche PMU 2014 (award for young photographers).
- Ponte City: Mikhael Subotzky & Patrick Waterhouse, January–April 2014.
- Mark Lewis: Above and Below, February–May 2015.
- Images of Conviction: The Construction of Visual Evidence, June–August 2015. Then toured to The Photographers' Gallery, London.
- Samuel Gratacap: Empire / Le Bal Award for Young Artists with ADAGP, September–October 2015. Curated by Pascal Beausse.
- A Handful of Dust - From the Cosmic to the Domestic, by David Campany, October 2015 – January 2016.
- Provoke: Between Protest and Performance - Photography in Japan 1960-1975, September–December 2016. Curated by Diane Dufour, Matthew Witkovsky and Duncan Forbes.

== Publications ==
- Anonymes: L’Amérique sans nom: Photographie et Cinéma (Anonymous: Unnamed America in Photography and Film). Paris: Le Bal; Göttingen: Steidl, 2010. ISBN 978-3869302157. Edited by David Campany and Diane Dufour. Text by Campany. Photographs by Jeff Wall, Walker Evans, Chauncey Hare, Lewis Baltz, Standish Lawder, Sharon Lockhart, Doug Rickard, Anthony Hernandez, Arianna Arcara & Luca Santese, and Bruce Gilden. French and English.
- Les Carnets du Bal #1: L'Image-Document, Entre Réalité et Fiction. Paris: Le Bal; Marseille: Images en Manoeuvre, 2010. Texts by Jean-Christophe Bailly, Alain Bergala, Victor Burgin, David Campany, Clément Chéroux, Jean-Paul Colleyn, Georges Didi-Huberman, Johan Grimonprez, Khalil Joreige, Gilles Mouëllic, Muriel Pic, Jean-Pierre Rehm and Susan Meiselas.
- Les Carnets du Bal #2: L'Image Déjà là, Usages de l'Objet Trouvé Photographique et Cinématographique. Marseille: Images en Manoeuvres, 2011. ISBN 978-2849952245. Text in French.
- Les Carnets du Bal #3: les Images Manquantes. Marseille: Images en Manoeuvres, 2012. ISBN 978-2849952450. Text in French.
- The Makes. By Eric Baudelaire. Juxtaposes never-filmed scenarios written by Michelangelo Antonioni with anonymous photographs from post-war Japanese cinema.
- Les Carnets du Bal #4: Que Peut une Image?. By Dork Zabunyan, Diane Dufour and Christine Vidal. Paris: Centre national des arts plastiques; Paris: Le Bal; Marseille: Textuel, 2014. ISBN 978-2845974838. Text in French.
- Les Carnets du Bal #5: La Persistance des Images. Diane Dufour and Christine Vidal. Paris: Le Bal; Paris: Textuel; Paris: Centre national des arts plastiques, 2014. Text in French.
- Anticorps. By Antoine D'Agata. Madrid: Xavier Barral; Paris: Le Bal, 2013. ISBN 9782365110037. Text in French.
- Dark Knees. By Mark Cohen. Paris: Editions Xavier Barral; Paris: Le Bal, 2013. ISBN 978-2-365110-42-6.
- Ils Pensent Déjà que je Suis Folle (They Already Think I’m Crazy). By Kourtney Roy. PMU; Paris: Le Bal; Trézélan: Filigranes, 2013. ISBN 978-2-35046-307-0. For Carte Blanche PMU 2013 (award for young photographers). English and French.
- Empire. By Samuel Gratacap. Paris: Le Bal; Trézélan: Filigranes, 2015. ISBN 978-2-35046-372-8. English and French.
- Images of Conviction: The Construction of Visual Evidence. Editions Xavier Barral and Le Bal, 2015. ISBN 9782365110839. Diane Dufour with Luce Lebart, Christian Delage and Eyal Weizman. With contributions by Jennifer L. Mnookin, Anthony Petiteau, Tomasz Kizny, Thomas Keenan, and Eric Stover. English version.
- Les Immobiles: Léa Habourdin & Thibault Brunet: Carte Blanche PMU 2014. PMU; Paris: Le Bal; Trézélan: Filigranes, 2015. ISBN 978-2-35046-341-4. French-language version.
- A Handful of Dust. By David Campany. Accompanied by an exhibition at Le Bal.
  - London: Mack; Paris: Le Bal, 2015. ISBN 9781910164389. English-language version.
  - Dust: Histoires de poussière: D'après Man Ray et Marcel Duchamp. London: Mack; Paris: Le Bal, 2015. ISBN 978-1910164488. French-language version.
