= Viviane Sassen =

Dutch photographer (born 1972)

- Born: 1972 (age 53–54); Amsterdam
- Education: Ateliers Arnhem
- Known for: Photography
- Movement: Contemporary Art
- Awards: International Center of Photography's Infinity Award, Kees Scherer Award, Prix de Rome (Netherlands)

Viviane Sassen (born 1972) is a Dutch artist living in Amsterdam. She is a photographer who works in both the fashion and fine art world. She is known for her use of geometric shapes, often abstractions of bodies. She has been widely published and exhibited. She was included in the 2011 New Photography exhibit at the Museum of Modern Art. She has created campaigns for Miu Miu, Stella McCartney, and Louis Vuitton, among others. She has won the Dutch Prix de Rome (2007) and the Infinity Award from International Center of Photography.

== Life and work ==
Sassen lived in Kenya as a child and often works in Africa. She started studying fashion at Arnhem, but soon turned to photography. She received her MFA from Royal Academy in Arnhem.

She is of the generation of photographer/artists that alternate personal, editorial, and commercial work and embrace an interdisciplinary attitude. She says, "You should always be able to judge a photograph on different grounds, on political, social, emotional, but also on personal grounds."

She is known for her use of geometric shapes, often abstractions of bodies. The photographed bodies are often intertwined, inspired by daily physical contact with strangers she experienced in Africa. Conscious of the stereotypical images of famine and poverty, she includes contemporary elements abundant in Africa like cell phones and automobiles.

Sassen was shortlisted for the Deutsche Börse Photography Prize 2015 for her exhibition Umbra at Nederlands Fotomuseum.

For several advertising campaigns, Sassen worked with fashion label 3.1 Phillip Lim. Commissioned by Italian luxury goods manufacturer Bottega Veneta, she photographed Mica Argañaraz and Sven de Vries at the Kröller-Müller Museum for the brand's spring/summer 2016 advertisements. Working on other campaigns, she later photographed Langley Fox at Villa Noailles for Lancel (2016) as well as Natalie Portman and Yara Shahidi for Dior (2022), among others.

== Publications ==
- Flamboya. Contrasto, 2008, ISBN 978-88-6965-139-7.
- Sketches: Polaroids of Africa. Kominek, 2010.
- Parasomnia. Munich: Prestel, 2011, ISBN 978-3-7913-4521-5.
- Die Son Sien Alles. Libraryman, 2011. ISBN 978-91-86269-19-7.
- Roxane. London and Paris: Oodee, 2012. ISBN 978-0-9570389-1-2.
- In and Out of Fashion. Munich: Prestel, 2012. ISBN 978-3-7913-4828-5.
- Etan&Me. London and Paris: Odee, 2013. ISBN 978-0-9570389-4-3.
- Lexicon. Tokyo: Art Beat, 2014. ISBN 978-4902080483. Edition of 1000 copies.
- Pikin Slee. Munich: Prestel, 2014. ISBN 978-3791349534. About the village Pikin Slee.
- Umbra. Munich: Prestel, 2015. ISBN 978-3791381602. Reprint edition.
- Roxane II. London and Paris: Odee, 2017. ISBN 978-0-9570389-9-8. Edition of 1000 copies. With a poem by Maria Barnas.
- Of Mud And Lotus. Tokyo: Art Beat, 2017. ISBN 978-4-902080-63-6. Edited by Shigeo Goto and Sawako Fukai. Edition of 1000 copies.
- Hot Mirror. Munich: Prestel, 2018. ISBN 978-3791384764.

== Exhibitions ==
=== Solo exhibitions ===
- 2013: In and Out of Fashion, Rencontres d'Arles, Arles, France
- 2014: Umbra, Netherlands Photo Museum, Rotterdam, the Netherlands
- 2014: Analemma: Fashion Photography 1992 – 2012, The Photographers' Gallery, London, October 2014 – January 2015

=== Exhibitions with others ===
- 2011/2012: New Photography 2011, Museum of Modern Art, New York, September 2011 – January 2012. Photographs by Sassen and Moyra Davey, Zhang Dali, George Georgiou, Deana Lawson and Doug Rickard.
- 2012: The Youth Code, part of Daegu Photo Biennale, South Korea. Included work by Sassen as well as Anouk Kruithof, Ryan McGinley and Willem Popelier.

== Awards ==
- 2007: Prix de Rome for her Ultra Violet photography series in Africa.
- 2011: Infinity Award: Applied/Fashion/Advertising Photography, International Center of Photography.
- 2013: German Photo Book Prize for In and Out of Fashion
- 2015: Honorary Fellowship of the Royal Photographic Society.
- 2015: David Octavius Hill Medal from the German Photography Academy
- 2016: German Photo Book Prize for Umbra
