= George Georgiou =

British photographer and photojournalist

- Born: 1961 (age 64–65); London, England
- Occupation: Photographer
- Spouse: Vanessa Winship
- Website: www.georgegeorgiou.net

George Georgiou (born 1961) is a freelance British photographer and photojournalist best known for his work in Eastern Europe, particularly Turkey.

== Career in photography ==
Born in London to Greek Cypriot parents, Georgiou graduated in photography from the Polytechnic of Central London.

Georgiou's work has focused on communities split between different cultures. After working for six years in Serbia, Greece and eastern Europe, he was recently based for four years in Istanbul. His work in Turkey led to a series of photographs titled Fault Lines/Turkey/East/West, which has led to several exhibitions and a book. Georgiou has also taught photography at Barnet College in London and a number of workshops in Europe.

Georgiou's early work was in black and white, but for Fault Lines and subsequent work, he moved to colour, using a compact camera with an articulated LCD that may be viewed from above, like the ground glass screen of a twin-lens reflex camera; this is because he believes it less intimidating for the people photographed than a camera held to the eye.

Georgiou belongs to Panos Pictures. His noncommercial approach has presented challenges; speaking in 2009, he described himself as having large debts but remaining optimistic.

== Turkey ==
Georgiou had long been curious about Turkey, and when his visit to Istanbul in 2003 coincided with bombings he determined to learn more about the issues involved. The eventual theme of his work in Turkey gradually emerged as he observed bleak new collective housing springing up for an incongruous urbanisation of the rugged Anatolian plateau. The resulting work, Fault Lines/Turkey/East/West, explores the notion of an East/West division and the additional and complex fault lines – religious/secular, tradition/modernity, and more – that cross the Turkey of today.

Georgiou started the work in monochrome but soon moved to colour. Photographing in spring and autumn helped in subduing the light and avoiding the blue skies familiar from National Geographic and the like.

In a review of Georgiou's exhibition Fault Lines at Side Gallery (Newcastle), Katie Lin found that his photographs evoked sadness rather than sympathy resulting from "the desolation and emptiness that features in so many of his shots." In some cases, this desolation was exaggerated by the "disproportional space awarded to the sky" or by the look of the "faces of passersby who just happened to get caught in the frame." But overall, she found the photographs were "thought-provoking and beautiful in content, composition and colour, a fantastic display of the everyday life experience of Turkish people".

Adam Stoltman wrote for the New York Times that in Fault Lines:

Through a series of haunting architectural and landscape scenes of Turkey's rush toward modernization – and the resulting tension between the secular and the modern – George Georgiou has visually put his finger on a kind of listless alienation which at times can seem to pervade globalized society.

== Georgia and Ukraine ==
In late 2010 Georgiou had been working for five years on In the Shadow of the Bear, a project that looks at the aftermath of the peaceful "Rose" and "orange" revolutions that took place in Georgia and Ukraine against the backdrop of Russia's resurgence as a major international power and its continuous involvement in the two nations' affairs. The project looks at signs in the domestic and public spheres, that when taken together build up a representation of how the people of Georgia and Ukraine negotiate the space that they find themselves in; individual aspects of the two very different countries, and aspects common to them through their shared history in the Soviet Union. Georgiou hopes to present this work in either one volume or two.

== Awards ==
- World Press Photo: Award for "The Serbs" (2002)
- Pictures of the Year International, prize for "Bombing Victim" (2003)
- World Press Photo: Award for "Flour War" (2004)
- Project Assistance Award from Nikon and the British Journal of Photography (2010)

== Bibliography ==
=== By Georgiou ===
- George Georgiou. Fault Lines/Turkey/East/West. Amsterdam: Schilt, 2010. 128 pp. ISBN 90-5330-715-X. (in English)
  - Fault Lines/Turquie/Est/Ouest. Trézélan: Filigranes, 2010. ISBN 2-35046-192-0. (in French)
  - Turkey / Τουρκία : Στη ρωγμή του χρόνου (Turkey / Tourkia: stē rōgmē tou chronou). Athens: Apeiron Photos, 2010. ISBN 960-94490-1-8. (in English and Greek)
  - Fault Lines/Turchia/Est/Ovest. Rome: Postcart, 2010. ISBN 978-88-86795-40-1. (in Italian)
- Last Stop. Self-published, 2015. Edition of 950 copies.
- Americans Parade. Self-published, 2019. With an introduction by David Campany and a short story by Vanessa Winship.

=== With contributions by Georgiou ===
- Street Photography Now. London: Thames & Hudson, 2010. ISBN 978-0-500-54393-1 (hardback). London: Thames & Hudson, 2011. ISBN 978-0-500-28907-5 (paperback). Edited by Sophie Howarth and Stephen McLaren.
- Unseen London. London: Hoxton Mini Press, 2017. ISBN 978-1-910566-24-4. With photographs by and interviews with various photographers, and text by Rachel Segal Hamilton.

== Exhibitions (with others) ==
- 2011/2012: New Photography 2011, Museum of Modern Art, New York. With Moyra Davey, Deana Lawson, Doug Rickard, Viviane Sassen and Zhang Dali.
- Last Stop, Le château d’eau, pôle photographique de Toulouse, Toulouse, France, January–March 2015. Exhibited alongside Voyage Mélancolique by Vanessa Winship.
