= Judith Freeman =

American novelist

Judith Freeman is an American novelist, frequently dealing with Western and Mormon themes. She has lived with her husband, artist-photographer Anthony Hernandez, in the Rampart District of Los Angeles since 1986.

== Bibliography ==
=== Novels ===
- "Family Attractions" (Short Stories) (1988)
- The Chinchilla Farm (1989)
- Set For Life (1991)
- A Desert of Pure Feeling (1996)
- Red Water (2002)
- MacArthur Park (2021)

=== Nonfiction ===
- The Long Embrace: Raymond Chandler and The Woman He Loved (2007)
- The Latter Days: A Memoir (2016)
