= Antoine d'Agata =

French photographer and film director (born 1961)

Antoine d'Agata (French: [dagata]; born 1961) is a French photographer and film director. His work deals with topics that are often considered taboo, such as addiction, sex, personal obsessions, darkness, and prostitution.

D'Agata is a full member of Magnum Photos. In 2001, he won the Niépce Prize for young photographers.

== Life and work ==
D'Agata was born in Marseille in 1961. He left France in 1983 to start a series of travels. He studied photography at the International Center of Photography in New York City in 1990, under the tutelage of Larry Clark and Nan Goldin.

D'Agata's work deals with addiction, sex, personal obsessions, darkness, prostitution, and other topics widely considered taboo. He often uses his own life experiences as source material. "My intimacy is linked so much to my work, and my work depends so much on my intimate experiences of the world. It's all intermingled."

D'Agata has been a full member of Magnum Photos since 2008. He has published more than a dozen books and three films.

In 2009, Tommaso Lusena and Giuseppe Schillaci released a documentary film about d'Agata called The Cambodian Room: Situations with Antoine d'Agata.

== Publications ==
=== Publications by d'Agata ===
- Mala Noche. France: En Vue, 1998.
- De Mala Muerte. Paris: Le Point du jour (Cherbourg-en-Cotentin), 1998.
- Hometown. Paris: Le Point du Jour Editeur, 2001.
- Antoine d'Agata. Spain: Centro de Estudios Fotograficos, 2001.
- Insomnia. Marseille: Images en Manoeuvre, 2003.
- Vortex. France: Atlantica, 2003.
- La Ville sans Nom. Paris: Le Point du Jour Editeur, 2004.
- Stigma. Marseille: Images en Manoeuvre, 2004. ISBN 9782849950098. With a text by Philippe Azoury.
- Manifeste. Cherbourg-Octeville (Manche): Le Point du Jour Editeur, 2005. ISBN 9782912132482.
- Psychogéographie. Paris: Le Point du Jour Editeur, 2005. ISBN 9782912132437. With texts by d'Agata and Bruno Le Dantec.
- Agonie. Arles: Actes Sud/Atelier de Visu, 2009. ISBN 978-2742786367 Text by Rafael Garido.
- Ice. Images En Manœuvres, 2011. ISBN 9782849952054.
- Position(s). Avarie, 2012, ISBN 9782954197401.
- Paraiso. France: Andre Frere, 2013. ISBN 9791092265149
- Anticorps. Madrid: Xavier Barral; Paris: Le Bal, 2013. ISBN 9782365110037. Catalogue for retrospective exhibition at Le Bal in Paris. Text in French.
- Antibodies. Munich: Prestel, 2014. ISBN 9783791349572. With a text by d'Agata translated into English.
- Fukushima. Tokyo: Super Labo, 2015. Text in English and Japanese. Edition of 500 copies.
- AiTHO. Roquevaire, France: Andre Frere, 2015. Text in French. Edition of 300 copies.
- Index. Roquevaire, France: Andre Frere, 2015. ISBN 979-10-92265-25-5.
- Cidade de Pedra. Athens: Void, 2016. ISBN 978-85-93212-00-0
- Codex – Mexico 1986–2007. Mexico: Editorial RM, 2016.
- Lilith. 64P series. Madrid: La Fábrica, 2017. ISBN 9788417048044. Text in English and Spanish.
- Self-Portraits: 1987–2017. Tokyo: Super Labo, 2017. Edition of 1000 copies.
- Oscurana. Athens: Void, 2018. ISBN 978-618-83825-7-2
- Acéphale. Arles: Studio Vortex, 2018.
- Stasis. Arles. Studio Vortex, 2019.

=== Publications paired with another ===
- Aïda Mady Diallo. Les Carnets de la Creation series. Montreuil, Paris: l'Oeil, 2003. ISBN 978-2912415493. A short story by Aïda Mady Diallo with photographs from Mali by d'Agata. In French.

=== Publications with contributions by d'Agata ===
- Home. Tokyo: Magnum Photos Tokyo, 2018. ISBN 978-4-9909806-0-3.
- Hunger. Athens: Void, 2018. ISBN 978-618-83318-4-6.

== Films ==
- Le Ventre du Monde = The World's Belly (2004)
- El Cielo del Muerto (2005) – documentary short
- Aka Ana (2008)
- Atlas (2012)
- White Noise (2019)

== Exhibitions ==
- 1001 Nuits, Paris, 2004.
- Antoine D'Agata: Anticorps, Fotomuseum Den Haag, 26 May – 2 September 2012; Le Bal, Paris, 24 January – 14 April 2013; Spazio Forma, Milan, 27 June – 1 September 2013; and Atsukobarouh, Tokyo, 23 May – 6 July 2015.

== Awards ==
- 2001: Niépce Prize, Association Gens d'images, Paris
- 2004: Overseas Photographer Prize, Higashikawa Prize, Japan
- 2013: Rencontres d'Arles Author's Book Award, Arles, France, for Anticorps (2013)
