= Vanessa Winship =

British photographer (born 1960)

Vanessa Winship HonFRPS
- Born: 1960 (age 65–66)
- Occupation: Photographer
- Notable work: Sweet Nothings; She Dances on Jackson
- Spouse: George Georgiou
- Website: www.vanessawinship.com

Vanessa Winship HonFRPS (born 1960) is a British photographer who works on long-term projects of portrait, landscape, reportage and documentary photography. These personal projects have predominantly been in Eastern Europe but also the USA. Winship's books include Schwarzes Meer (2007), Sweet Nothings (2008) and She Dances on Jackson (2013).

Her first retrospective exhibition was at Fundación Mapfre gallery in Madrid in 2014. Her first major UK solo exhibition is at Barbican Art Gallery, London, in 2018. Her work has also been exhibited twice in the National Portrait Gallery in London and prominently at Rencontres d'Arles in France.

Winship has won two World Press Photo Awards, "Photographer of the Year" at the Sony World Photography Awards, the HCB Award (the first woman to do so) and in 2018 an Honorary Fellowship of the Royal Photographic Society. She is a member of Agence Vu photography agency.

== Biography ==
Winship grew up in Barton-upon-Humber, rural Lincolnshire. She studied at Baysgarth School; Hull Art College (which included a photography module); photography at Filton Technical College, Bristol; and photography, film, and video at the Polytechnic of Central London from 1984 to 1987, graduating with a BA (Hons). She met her husband, the photographer George Georgiou, on the degree course.

From 1999 she spent a decade living and working in the Balkans and surrounding territories of Turkey and the Black Sea. First she lived in Belgrade, for a short while in Athens, and five years in Istanbul.

Her work is about the concepts of borders, land, desire, identity, belonging, memory and history, how those histories are told and how identities are expressed.

Her books have been widely acclaimed. Sean O'Hagan, writing in The Guardian, said: "She is perhaps best known for Sweet Nothings, one of my favourite photography books of recent years." She Dances on Jackson was considered by Simon Bainbridge (editor of the BJP), Sean O'Hagan, Rob Hornstra and other reviewers to be shortlisted amongst the best photography books released in 2013. Phil Coomes, Picture editor at BBC News, said: "This is pure photography, and in my view, when viewed as a whole, is about as good as it gets."

Winship is a member of Agence Vu photography agency and the World Photographic Academy. As of 2012 and 2013 she was based in London and Folkestone, England.

== Techniques ==
Winship and George Georgiou travel together, alternating between one working and the other either supporting them or experimenting with their own photography.

She uses black-and-white photographic film in natural light. For her work in a reportage—or street—style she has used a 35 mm hand-held camera, (Note: Schwarzes Meer was shot using 35 mm.) for her landscape work she has at times used a medium format camera and for her portraiture work she has at times used a 5×4-inch large format camera. (Note: Sweet Nothings was shot using a large format camera.) She says of the difference between using 35 mm and large format that "Each methodology makes for a different relationship with my subjects [and] both have their own beauty for me".

== Projects ==
- Georgia in Transition (2004)
- Ukraine, Spring (2005)
- Imagined States and Desires: A Balkan Journey 1 (2006)
- Ashura – Turkey, Istanbul (2006)
- Black Sea: Between chronicle and fiction (2007)
- Sweet Nothings: The Schoolgirls from the Borderlands of Eastern Anatolia (2007)
- Georgia, a Small Piece of Eden (2009)
- Georgia, Schoolchildren (2011)

== Publications ==
=== Publications by Winship ===
- Schwarzes Meer (Black Sea). Hamburg: Mare, 2007. ISBN 978-3-936543-95-7.
- Sweet Nothings.
  - Marseille, France: Images en Manœuvres, 2008. ISBN 978-2-849951-29-3.
  - London: Foto8, 2008. ISBN 978-0-955958-00-7.
- She Dances on Jackson. London: Mack, 2013. ISBN 978-1-907946-36-3. Reprint edition. London: Mack, 2018.
- Vanessa Winship. Madrid: Fundación Mapfre, 2014. ISBN 978-8498444681. A retrospective.
- And Time Folds. London: Mack, 2018. ISBN 978-1-912339-09-9. A retrospective. Published to accompany an exhibition at Barbican Art Gallery, London. Photographs from seven series, made in the Balkans, Turkey, the Caucasus, Georgia, America and the UK, as well as Winship's personal archival material and an essay by David Chandler.
- Seeing The Light of Day. B-Sides Box Set, 2019. Set of 50 cards. Edition of 1000 copies.
- Sete 19. le bec en l'air, 2019. With a text by fr:Christian Caujolle.
- Snow. Los Angeles: Deadbeat Club, 2022. With a story by Jem Poster. ISBN 978-1-952523-03-8. Soft cover.

=== Publications with contributions by Winship ===
- The Grain of the Present. San Francisco: Pier 24 Photography, 2017. ISBN 978-0-9972432-1-5. With a text by Kim Beil. Edition of 1000 copies. Exhibition catalogue.

== Exhibitions ==
=== Solo exhibitions ===
- Black Sea, Vannes, 2008; Paris, 2008; Shenyang, 2008; Newcastle, UK, 2009; Sète, 2011; Rome, 2011.
- Sweet Nothings: The Schoolgirls from the Borderlands of Eastern Anatolia, Rencontres d'Arles, France, 2008; Athens, 2008; Lillebonne, 2009; London, 2009; Rotterdam, Netherlands, 2009; Newcastle, UK, 2009; Saint-Denis, 2010; Foligno, 2010; Milan, 2010; Vichy, 2013.
- Georgia, Rencontres internationales de la photographie en Gaspésie, Canada, 2012; Third Floor Gallery, Cardiff, Wales, 2013.
- She Dances on Jackson, Henri Cartier-Bresson Foundation, Paris, 2013.
- Retrospective, Fundación Mapfre gallery, Madrid, during PHotoEspaña, 2014. (Note: Not being Spanish, her show is not officially included within PHotoEspaña 2014 as in that year it focused on Spanish photography.)
- Vanessa Winship: And Time Folds, Barbican Art Gallery, London, 2018 Work from Imagined States and Desires: a Balkan Journey, Black Sea: Between Chronicle and Fiction, Sweet Nothings, Georgia: Seeds Carried by the wind, Humber, And Time Folds, She Dances on Jackson as well as ephemera.

=== Exhibitions with others ===
- Voyage Mélancolique, Le château d’eau, pôle photographique de Toulouse, Toulouse, France, 2015. Work from Black Sea, Georgia, She dances on Jackson and Sweet Nothings. Exhibited alongside Last Stop by George Georgiou.
- Ballarat International Foto Biennale, Ballarat, Victoria, Australia, 2019

== Awards ==
- 1998 – First prize, Arts Stories category, World Press Photo Awards, for Junior Ballroom Dancers
- 2003 – Honorable mention, Leica Oskar Barnack Award, awarded by Leica Camera AG at Rencontres Internationales de la Photographie, Arles, France, for "Albanian Landscape"
- 2008
  - Godfrey Argent Award for the best portrait in black and white (part of the Taylor Wessing Photographic Portrait Prize), National Portrait Gallery, London, for the series Sweet Nothings
  - Iris D'Or (overall winner), Photographer of the Year, Sony World Photography Awards, World Photography Organisation (WPO)
  - Winner, Portraiture category, Professional Competition, Sony World Photography Awards, World Photography Organisation (WPO), for a photograph from Sweet Nothings
  - First prize, Portraits Stories category, 2007 World Press Photo Awards, for Sweet Nothings
  - FIOF (Fondo Internazionale Orvieto Fotografia) Book Prize 2008 (AKA the Orvieto Book Prize), Reportage section, awarded by Associazione Fotografi Italiana, Orvieto, Italy, for Schwarzes Meer
  - Final selection, Leica Oskar Barnack Award, awarded by Leica Camera AG at Rencontres Internationales de la Photographie, Arles, France, for Schwarzes Meer
- 2009 – Second Prize, Taylor Wessing Photographic Portrait Prize, National Portrait Gallery, London, for Girl in a Golden Dress from the series Georgia for a Song
- 2010
  - PHotoEspaña (PHE) Discovery Award for best portfolio (Premio PHotoEspaña Descubrimientos al mejor portfolio), International Festival of Photography and Visual Arts, Madrid, Spain, for the series Sweet Nothings
  - National Media Museum 2010 Photography Award, Bradford, England
- 2011 – Prize-winner, HCB Award 2011, Henri Cartier-Bresson Foundation, a €30,000 grant for She Dances on Jackson (then known as Out there: An American Odyssey)
- 2018: Honorary Fellowship of the Royal Photographic Society, Bath
