= Mark Cohen (photographer) =

American photographer

- Born: 1943 (age 82–83); Wilkes-Barre, Pennsylvania U.S.
- Occupation: Photographer

Mark Cohen (born August 24, 1943) is an American photographer best known for his innovative close-up street photography.

Cohen's major books of photography are Grim Street (2005), True Color (2007), and Mexico (2016). His work was first exhibited in a group exhibition at George Eastman House in 1969 and he had his first solo exhibition at the Museum of Modern Art in New York City in 1973. He was awarded Guggenheim Fellowships in 1971 and 1976. and received a National Endowment for the Arts grant in 1975.

== Life and work ==
Cohen was born and lived in Wilkes-Barre, Pennsylvania until 2013. He attended Penn State University and Wilkes College between 1961 and 1965, and opened a commercial photo studio in 1966.

The majority of the photography for which Cohen is known is shot in the Scranton/Wilkes-Barre metropolitan area (also known as the Wyoming Valley), a historic industrialized region of northeastern Pennsylvania. Characteristically Cohen photographs people close-up, using a wide-angle lens and a flash, mostly in black and white, frequently cropping their heads from the frame, concentrating on small details. He has used 21 mm, 28 mm and 35 mm focal length, wide-angle, lenses and later on 50 mm. Cohen has described his method as 'intrusive'; "They're not easy pictures. But I guess that's why they're mine."

Discussing his influences with Thomas Southall in 2004 he cites ". . . so many photographers who followed Cartier-Bresson, like Frank, Koudelka, Winogrand, Friedlander." He also recognizes the influence of Diane Arbus. Whilst acknowledging these influences he says: "I knew about art photography...Then I did these outside the context of any other photographer."

In 2013, Cohen moved to Philadelphia, Pennsylvania.

In 2026, Cohen was announced as an inductee into the Luzerne County Arts & Entertainment Hall of Fame.

== Publications ==
=== Books by Cohen ===
- Mark Cohen, Photographer: A Monograph. 1980. 38 pp. OCLC 14157788.
- Mark Cohen: October 10 – December 13, 1981. Washington, DC: Corcoran Gallery of Art, 1981. 24 pp. OCLC 8793002.
- Images: A Photographic Essay of Northeastern Pennsylvania. Avoca, PA: Economic Development Council of Northeastern Pennsylvania, 1982. 58 pp. OCLC 40750751.
- Five Minutes in Mexico: Photographs. Wilkes-Barre, PA: Sordoni Art Gallery, 1989. 71 pp. ISBN 0-942945-00-X.
- Grim Street. New York: powerHouse, 2005. ISBN 1-57687-230-0.
- True Color. New York: powerHouse, 2007. ISBN 1-57687-372-2. Text by Vince Aletti. Work in colour originating as a commission from George Eastman House.
- Italian Riviera. Rome: Punctum, 2008. ISBN 978-8-895410-16-6. Edition of 40 copies. Made along the Levante Riviera, during his stay in Rapallo, Liguria.
- Mark Cohen: Strange Evidence. Self-published / CreateSpace, 2012. ISBN 978-1456563738. Catalogue of the exhibition Mark Cohen: Strange Evidence at the Philadelphia Museum of Art, January 2010 to March 2011, curated by Peter Barbiere.
- Dark Knees. Paris: Xavier Barral, 2013. ISBN 978-2-365110-42-6. "Wilkes-Barre and around Pennsylvania 1969–2012". "Published on the occasion of the exhibition Mark Cohen Dark Knees at [Le Bal] in Paris between September 27 and December 8, 2013 and at the Nederlands Fotomuseum in Rotterdam between November 8, 2014 and January 11, 2015."
- Frame: a Retrospective. Austin: University of Texas, 2015. ISBN 978-1-4773-0372-6. With an introduction by Jane Livingston.
- Mexico. Austin: University of Texas, 2016. ISBN 978-1-4773-1171-4.
- Bread in Snow. Tokyo: Super Labo, 2019. ISBN 978-4-908512-68-1.
- Cotton. Tokyo: Super Labo, 2021. ISBN 978-4-908512-46-9.
- Groundworks. Tokyo: Super Labo, 2024. ISBN 978-4-911112-09-0.
- NAPLES AND PALERMO, APRIL 2002. Melbourne: Light of Day, 2024.
- Mark Cohen Trespass by Phillip Prodger. Prestel, 2025. ISBN 978-3-791393544.

=== Contributions to publications ===
- Contatti. Provini d'Autore = Choosing the best photo by using the contact sheet. Vol. I. Edited by Giammaria De Gasperis. Rome: Postcart, 2012. ISBN 978-88-86795-87-6.

=== Books about Cohen ===
- Wonders Seen in Forsaken Places: An essay on the photographs and the process of photography of Mark Cohen by Alphonso Lingis. Self-published / CreateSpace, 2010. ISBN 978-1442180536.

== Awards ==
- 1971: Guggenheim Fellowship, John Simon Guggenheim Memorial Foundation
- 1975: National Endowment for the Arts grant
- 1976: Guggenheim Fellowship, John Simon Guggenheim Memorial Foundation

== Exhibitions ==
=== Solo exhibitions ===
- 1962: Pennsylvania State University, University Park
- 1965: Wilkes College, Wilkes-Barre, Pennsylvania
- 1967: Spanish National Tourist Office, New York City
- 1973: Photographs by Mark Cohen, Museum of Modern Art, New York City
- 1975: Art Institute of Chicago
- 2010/2011: Mark Cohen: Strange Evidence, Philadelphia Museum of Art
- 2013: Mark Cohen: Italian Riviera, 2008, Maslow Collection at Marywood University, Scranton, PA
- 2013: Dark Knees (1969–2012), Le Bal, Paris
- 2014: Mark Cohen, Danziger Gallery, New York
- 2014/2015: Dark Knees, Netherlands Photo Museum, Rotterdam

=== Group exhibitions ===
- 1969: Vision and Expression, George Eastman House, Rochester, New York. Organised by Nathan Lyons.
- 1978: Mirrors and Windows: American Photography Since 1960, Museum of Modern Art, New York City

== Collections ==
Cohen's work is held in the following permanent collections:

- Art Institute of Chicago, Chicago
- Corcoran Gallery of Art, Washington, D.C.
- Fogg Art Museum, Cambridge, MA
- George Eastman House, Rochester, New York
- Metropolitan Museum of Art, New York City
- Musee de la Photographie, Belgium
- Museum of Fine Arts, Houston
- Museum of Modern Art, New York City
- National Gallery of Victoria, Melbourne, Australia
- The Polaroid Collection, Massachusetts Institute of Technology, Cambridge, MA
- Victoria and Albert Museum, London
- Whitney Museum of American Art, New York City: 4 prints
