= Aïda Mady Diallo =

Malian writer and film director

Aida Mady Diallo
- Born: France
- Occupations: Novelist and director

Aïda Mady Diallo is a French and Malian novelist and director. She is the author of the novel Kouty, mémoire de sang (2002).

== Life and work ==
After her childhood in France and receiving a college degree in Uzbekistan, Diallo moved to Mali.

Her novel Kouty, mémoire de sang (Kouty, Memories of Blood), tells the story of a young girl in 1980s in Gao region, in the northern part of Mali, seeking revenge for the death of her family at the hands of Tuareg killers. In an interview with the magazine Bamako Culture, Diallo described the novel as "a call for tolerance and forgiveness." Critic Pim Higginson described it as adapting the tropes of the crime novel and romance novel to criticise the fascination of Western readers with African violence.

Diallo's television film Karim et Doussou, the story of a contemporary Malian marriage, was nominated for a 2011 Panafrican Film and Television Festival of Ouagadougou (FESPACO) award.

== Publications ==
- Kouty, mémoire de sang. Paris: Gallimard, 2002. ISBN 2-07-042251-8.
- Aïda Mady Diallo. Les Carnets de la Creation series. Montreuil, Paris: l'Oeil, 2003. ISBN 978-2912415493. A short story by Diallo with photographs by Antoine d'Agata. In French.
