= Irene Küng =

Swiss photographer

- Born: 1958 (age 67–68); Switzerland
- Occupation: Photographer
- Known for: Fine art photography

Irene Küng (born 1958 in Switzerland) is a Swiss photographer whose work primarily features urban and natural landscapes.

The essentiality of the shots and the ability to make her subjects emerge from the darkness, in fact, express a stylistic and conceptual proximity to the Italian pictorial Renaissance: her works highlight the rational desire to identify new possible paths for a sustainable future and renewed attention to the balance between human and natural. At the same time, Kung's compositions highlight by contrast the ambiguity of urbanization and human neglect, bringing out a subtle disquiet from beauty. Describing suffering through a refined and dreamlike representation is an attempt to generate a new meaning starting from the perceptions of an emotional experience, it is an abstraction that leads the artist from the darkest areas to the meditative dimension, up to the unconscious spaces of the soul.

== Career ==
Küng began her career in graphic design and painting before shifting to photography, where she has been recognized internationally for her approach to architectural and natural subjects.

Küng has achieved international recognition with many exhibitions in New York, London, Milan, Beijing and Moscow. She has exhibited at the Bozar Museum in Brussels, Belgium, at the Palazzo della Ragione in Milan and in the spectacular surroundings of the Certosa San Giacomo in Capri, Italy.

Her work has appeared in numerous international magazines such as The New York Times Magazine, The Sunday Times Magazine, Sette del Corriere della Sera, China Daily and was selected by the international jury at ParisPhoto 2010.

She was invited by Contrasto to contribute to EXPO 2015 with a solo show at the Fruit and Legumes Cluster featuring 26 photographs of fruit trees. Other photographers involved in the clusters project were Sebastião Salgado, Martin Parr, Gianni Berengo Gardin, Alex Webb, Joel Meyerowitz, George Steinmetz, Ferdinando Scianna and Alessandra Sanguinetti

The book Trees follows The Invisible City, on architecture photographs, that was published in 2012 in English, Italian, French and Chinese.

In 2018 Küng worked with Porsche to celebrate the launch of the new 911. Her photographs depict landscapes and cities, with the 911 embedded within them in such a way that the viewer only perceives the sports car at a second glance. Irene Kung: “The 911 is a style icon. Although the design has developed over time, it still remains true to form. My pictures are narrative and that is what they have in common with paintings. They are like film scenes whose complete story can be created by the viewer."

Since 2018 four of her works from the Invisible Cities series have been part of Civilization: The Way We Live Now, a travelling exhibition curated by Willian Ewing, Holly Roussell Perret-Gentil and Bartomeu Marí of FEP. The exhibition has already toured eight major venues in Asia, Oceania and Europe such as the Ullens Center for Contemporary Art in Beijing, the Musée des Civilisations de l’Europe et de la Méditerranée (Mucem) in Marseille and the Saatchi Gallery in London.

== Solo exhibitions ==
- 2008
  - Exhibiting new works by Irene Küng at Chiaroscuro Contemporary Art in Santa Fe, New Mexico, USA, and additional photographs at Chiaroscuro in Scottsdale, Arizona, USA
- 2009
  - Goedhuis Contemporary, London, UK
- 2010
  - Oltre il Reale, Forma Centro Internazionale di Fotografia, Milan, Italy
  - Photographica FineArt Gallery, Lugano, Switzerland
- 2012
  - Daydream, Forma Galleria, Milan, Italy
  - Galleria Valentina Bonomo, Rome, Italy
  - Chiaroscuro Contemporary Art, Santa Fe, NM, USA
  - Goedhuis Contemporary, London, UK
- 2013
  - Forma Galleria, Milan, Italy
  - Photographica Fine Art, Lugano, Switzerland
  - Photolux Festival, Lucca, Italy
  - Imagokinetics Gallery, Hangzhou, China
  - The Temple, Beijing, China
- 2014
  - ArtPassions la Galerie, Geneva, Switzerland
- 2015
  - Chiaroscuro Contemporary Art, Santa Fe, NM, USA
  - Forma Galleria, Milan, Italy
- 2016
  - Galleria Contrasto, Milan, Italy
- 2017
  - "Trees" by Irene Küng, presented at Chiaroscuro Contemporary Art, Santa Fe, New Mexico, USA
  - Galleria Valentina Bonomo, Rome, Italy
- 2018
  - A solo showcase of Irene Küng's work at Chiaroscuro Contemporary Art, Santa Fe, New Mexico, USA
- 2019
  - "Irene Kung. Monumenti." Project Room, CAMERA - Centro Italiano per la Fotografia, Turin, Italy
- 2021
  - "Seven Trees" by Irene Küng, on display at Chiaroscuro Contemporary Art, Santa Fe, New Mexico, USA
- 2022
  - Rough, Tough and Mystic, Galleria Valentina Bonomo, Rome, Italy
  - Rough, Tough and Mystic, The Temple, Beijing, China
  - M97 Gallery, Shanghai, China
  - Rough, Tough and Mystic, Alessia Paladini Gallery, Milan, Italy
- 2023
  - "Rough, Tough and Mystic: Visions of Yunnan and Tibet" by Irene Küng, exhibited at Chiaroscuro Contemporary Art, Santa Fe, New Mexico, USA
  - The Forest of the Soul, Académie du Climat, Paris, France
- 2024
  - Platinum Landmarks, The Temple, Beijing, China

== Group exhibition ==
- 2010
  - Irene Küng participates in the BMW – Paris Photo Prize at Paris Photo, Paris, France
  - Nautre Sensibili, Fondazione Forma per la Fotografia, Milan, Italy
  - Puglia Conteporanea: Artisti a Palazzo, Gagliano del Capo, Italy
- 2011
  - Visioni Urbane, Fondazione Forma per la Fotografia, Milan, Italy
- 2012
  - Affinità e differenze. Da Haas a Zoran Music, Madonna dell’Orto, Venice, Italy
  - Mare Nostrum, Certosa di San Giacomo, Stanze del Priore, Capri, Italy
- 2013
  - La stanza di Irene, Galleria Bonomo, Bari, Italy
  - La seduzione delle forme, Casa dei Tre Oci, Venice, Italy
- 2014
  - The "NY. B&W" exhibition, featuring works including those by Irene Küng, at Pobeda Gallery, Moscow, Russia
  - Capri Trend, Masterworks Museum, Hamilton, Bermuda
- 2015
  - A collective fall exhibition, including Irene Küng's pieces, at Chiaroscuro Contemporary Art, Santa Fe, New Mexico, USA
  - The Garden of Wonders, Fruits and Legumes Cluster, EXPO 2015, Milan
- 2016
  - Guarienti, una bottega, Castello di Conversano, Apulia, Italy
  - Les Racines du Ciel, Saanen, Switzerland
- 2017
  - Seasonal exhibitions "Holiday Show" and "Spring Show" featuring Irene Küng among others, at Chiaroscuro Contemporary Art, Santa Fe, New Mexico, USA
  - Sea(e)scapes. Visioni di Mare, Galleria Contrasto, Milan, Italy
- 2018
  - Irene Küng's works featured in various seasonal group shows at Chiaroscuro Contemporary Art, Santa Fe, New Mexico, USA
  - Il Giardino Incantato, Galleria Contrasto, Milan, Italy
- 2019
  - Participation in the Spring Group Show Chiaroscuro Contemporary Art, Santa Fe, New Mexico, USA
  - Civilization: The Way We Live Now at UCCA Beijing, Beijing, China
- 2020
  - The Edges and fall exhibitions showcasing Irene Küng's contributions at Chiaroscuro Contemporary Art, Santa Fe, New Mexico, USA
- 2021
  - Inspired By The Land in its first and second parts, featuring works by Irene Küng at Chiaroscuro Contemporary Art, Santa Fe, New Mexico, USA
  - La fotografia a Capri: una storia di sguardi, Certosa di San Giacomo, Capri
- 2022
  - Building an art bridge between Italy and Zambia, Lusaka, Zambia
- 2023
  - Exhibitions like "Inspired by the Land & Sea" and "Civilization: The Way We Live Now" at the Saatchi Gallery, London, UK, including Irene Küng's artistry
- 2024
  - Winter exhibitions focusing on medium = paper and another group show including Irene Küng's work at Chiaroscuro Contemporary Art, Santa Fe, New Mexico, USA

== Books ==
Title	Summary
CIVILIZATION: THE WAY WE LIVE NOW	A photographic exploration of global 21st-century civilization.
TREES	Photographic celebration of diverse tree species.
9 PHOTOGRAPHERS FOR THE PLANET	Collaborative photographic project on sustainability and the environment.
HENRI CARTIER-BRESSON E GLI ALTRI	Italy through the eyes of Henri Cartier-Bresson and other photographers.
THE INVISIBLE CITY	Transformative photographs of cities at night.
BULGARI Y ROMA	Intersection of Rome's architecture and Bulgari's design inspiration.
HOMEWARD, SELECTIONS FROM THE WIELAND COLLECTION	Exploration of the concept of home through the Wieland Collection.
