= Siri Kaur =

American artist

Siri Kaur is an artist/photographer who lives and works in Los Angeles, where she also serves as associate professor at Otis College of Art and Design. She received an MFA in photography from California Institute of the Arts in 2007, an MA in Italian studies in 2001 from Smith College/Universita’ di Firenze, Florence, Italy, and BA in comparative literature from Smith College in 1998. Kaur was the recipient of the Portland Museum of Art Biennial Purchase Prize in 2011. She regularly exhibits and has had solo shows at Blythe Projects and USC's 3001 galleries in Los Angeles, and group shows at the Torrance Museum of Art, California Institute of Technology, and UCLA’s Wight Biennial. Her work has been reviewed in Artforum, art ltd., The L.A. Times, and The Washington Post, and is housed in the permanent collections of the National Gallery in Washington, D.C., and the University of Maine.

== Solo exhibitions ==
- SHE TELLS ALL, Eric Buterbaugh Gallery, Los Angeles, CA, 2019
- Upper Layers, El Clasificado, Los Angeles, CA and Venice, Italy, 2019
- Crow’s Field, Vermont Center for Photography, Brattleboro, VT, 2018
- Urban Lights: 10th Anniversary Portraits, Art Catalogs LACMA, Los Angeles CountyMuseum of Art, Los Angeles, CA, 2018
- Crow’s Field, Kopeikin Gallery, Los Angeles, CA,2017.
- This Kind of Face, Cohen Gallery, Los Angeles, CA, 2015.
- This Kind of Face, 99¢ Plus, New York, NY
- Rob and Heather and Chris and Otto and Koral…, Vermont Center for Photography, Brattleboro, VT
- Know Me for the First Time, Blythe Projects, Los Angeles, CA (catalog), 2013.
- Field Trip, 3001 Gallery, Roski School of Art, University of Southern California, Los Angeles, CA, 2013.
- More Than or Equal to Half of the Whole (with Kate Johnson), Garboushian Gallery, Beverly Hills, CA, 2013.
- I too was in Arcadia, Gallery 825, Los Angeles, CA, 2008
- Cruiserweight, D300 Gallery, California Institute of The Arts, Valencia, CA, 2007.
- The Collectors, L-Shape Gallery, California Institute of The Arts, Valencia, CA, 2006.

== Selected group exhibitions ==
2022

- Golden Hour: California Photography from the Los Angeles County Museum of Art, California State University, Northridge, Art Gallery, Northridge, CA, curated by Eve Schillo

2021

- Garden, Ladies' Room, Los Angeles, CA
- Golden Hour: California Photography from the Los Angeles County Museum of Art, Vincent Price Art Museum, East Los Angeles College, Los Angeles, CA, curated by Eve Schillo
- Golden Hour: California Photography from the Los Angeles County Museum of Art, Riverside Art Museum, Riverside, CA, curated by Eve Schillo
- Golden Hour: California Photography from the Los Angeles County Museum of Art, Lancaster Museum of Art and History, Lancaster, CA, curated by Eve Schillo
- Every Woman Biennial, Superchief Gallery, New York, NY

2020

- Men of Steel, Women of Wonder, Addison Gallery of American Art, Andover, MA

2019

- Men of Steel, Women of Wonder, San Antonio Museum of Art, San Antonio, TX
- A Secret, River Gallery, Los Angeles, CA and Berlin, Germany
- Every Woman Biennial, Bendix Building, Los Angeles
- Men of Steel, Women of Wonder, Crystal Bridges Museum of American Art, Bentonville, AR
- Keeping up with the Gagosians, El Clasificado, Los Angeles, CA

2018

- Super Radiance, The Nook Gallery, Los Angeles, CA
- Anti-Nostalgia, The Carrack Modern, Durham, NC
- Covers, The Bloke, Pasadena, CA (curated by Justin Cole)

2017

- Back to School, Los Angeles Center of Photography, Los Angeles, CA
- Greetings From, The Art Barge, Amagansett, NY

2016

- INFOCUS: Second Triennial of Self-Published Photobooks, Phoenix Art Museum, Phoenix, AZ
- Postage Required, Vermont Center for Photography, Brattleboro, VT
- The Last Four Years, Stephen Cohen Gallery, Los Angeles, CA
- To Whom it May Concern, 99¢ Plus, New York, NY

2015

- Directors’ Cut: Selections from Maine Art Museums, Portland Museum of Art, Portland, ME
- Neo-Pre-Post-Contra-Para-Anti-Hyper-Pro-Trans-Ultra-Photography, Spectre Arts, Durham, NC

2014

- INFOCUS: Self-Published Photobooks, Phoenix Art Museum, Phoenix, AZ
- Of the Afternoon, Darnley Gallery, London, UK
- Summer Open, Aperture Foundation, New York, NY
- 99¢ Plus!, 99¢ Plus, New York, NY
- 24/7 (still life), Stephen Cohen Gallery, Los Angeles, CA
- A Forest: Cathy Ackers, Annie Buckley, Anita Bunn, Siri Kaur, 2A Gallery, Los Angeles, CA
- From Her, El Pueblo Historical Monument, Los Angeles, CA

2013

- Influenced by the Sun, Stephen Cohen Gallery, Los Angeles, CA
- Staking Claim: The California Triennial of Photography, Museum of Photographic Arts, San Diego, CA
- Falling From Great Heights: Siri Kaur, John Knuth, Heather Rasmussen, Stephen Cohen Gallery, Los Angeles, CA
- Out of Thin Air, LAX, Los Angeles, CA

2012

- Siri Kaur, Soo Kim, and Christina Ondrus, Woodbury University Gallery, Hollywood, CA

2011

- Pissed Elegance, Stephen Cohen Gallery, Los Angeles, CA
- Cosmic Prom, Vortex Immersion Dome, Los Angeles, CA
- Chain Letter, Shoshana Wayne Gallery, Los Angeles, CA
- Too True, POST, Los Angeles, CA (catalog)
- Nuove Opere, U-Skill Gallery, Rome, Italy
- The Series, The Standard Hotel, Los Angeles, CA
- Fuck Pretty, Robert Berman Gallery, Santa Monica, CA
- Redefining Hollywood, The Factory at Fabrik Magazine, Los Angeles, CA
- Play Time, See Line Gallery at the Pacific Design Center, Los Angeles, CA
- Sing Me to Sleep, Angles Gallery, Los Angeles, CA
- Curious Silence, Brand Library Gallery, Glendale, CA (catalog)
- 2011 Biennial, Portland Museum of Art, Portland, ME (catalog)

2010

- (Por)trait Revealed, RayKo Photo Center, San Francisco, CA
- See-Thru, Gallery 825 and The Icon, Los Angeles, CA (catalog)
- Altimetry, curated by Mark Steven Greenfield, LAX and Los Angeles Municipal Art Gallery, Los Angeles, CA
- Contemporary Art RUHR Projects, Ruhr, Germany
- Outside the Project, curated by Jess Minckley, RAID Projects and Light & Wire Gallery, Los Angeles, CA (catalog)
- Curious Silence, curated by Renee Martin & Heather Rasmussen, SOIL Gallery, Seattle, WA
- Perspective, curated by Paula Tognarelli, Center for Fine Art Photography, Fort Collins, CO
- More with Less, curated by Kristina Newhouse & Robert Brander Gallery 825, Los Angeles, CA

2008

- Truth or Dare, curated by Craig Krull, Gallery 825, Los Angeles, CA
- In the Bedroom, curated by Marty Weiss, Meter Gallery, New York, NY
- Members Only, curated by Keith Carter, Dishman Art Museum, Beaumont, TX
- Everyone’s a Curator, Telic Gallery, Los Angeles, CA
- Conventions and Attitudes, curated by Karen Atkinson, Trade & Row, Los Angeles, CA
- Projection, curated by Maria Jenson, Salon Oblique, Santa Monica, CA

2007

- All In, curated by Lorraine Molina, Torrance Museum of Art, Torrance, CA
- My Buddy, UCLA Wight Biennial, curated by Russell Ferguson, UCLA Wight Gallery, Los Angeles, CA
- You are Beautiful, Hayworth Gallery, Los Angeles, CA
- For Ever, curated by Eungie Joo, 915 Mateo, Los Angeles, CA
- Making Meaning, curated by Howard Fox, Gallery 825, Los Angeles, CA

2006

- Mid-Residency Show, California Institute of the Arts, Valencia, CA
- Open Show, curated by Ann Philbin, Gallery 825, Los Angeles, CA
- I Would Be You, Newspace Gallery, Portland, Oregon
- Photography Now, curated by Natasha Lunn, 401 Projects & Center for Photography at Woodstock, New York, NY & Woodstock, NY

2006

- NOW, Soho Photo Gallery, New York, NY

2005

- Nothing to See Here, curated by Walead Beshty, Art 2102, Los Angeles, CA
- New Photography, Riverside Metropolitan Art Museum, Riverside, CA
- Beauty, Women in Photography International, New York, NY
- In Focus: Photography Techniques and Trends, Target Gallery, Alexandria, VA
- Photography Now, Newspace Center for Photography, Portland, OR
- The Image is the Message, DreamBox Photo Gallery, Chicago, IL
- National Women’s Show, Washington Gallery of Photography, Bethesda, MD

2004

- Virtual*Visual, Women in Photography International, New York, NY/ Los Angeles, CA

== Collections ==
- Crystal Bridges Museum of American Art
- Los Angeles County Museum of Art
- Houston Museum of Fine Arts, Houston, TX
- National Portrait Gallery, Washington D.C.
- Portland Museum of Art, Portland, ME
- University of Maine Art Museum, Orono, ME
- Washington Gallery of Photography, Washington, D.C.
- Collection of Lawrence Gagosian
- Collection of Oprah Winfrey

== Awards and grants ==
- Charcoal Publishing Prize, 2020
- COLA Grant Artist Portraits, 12 portraits for COLA grants catalog, 2012
- Center for Cultural Innovation/ Durfee Grant, 2011
- Portland Museum of Art Biennial Purchase Prize, 2006
- California Institute of the Arts Merit Scholarship, 2006
- Critical Mass Publishing Prize Finalist, 2005

== Residencies ==
- The Arctic Circle, Svalbard, Greenland, 2023
- Bonfire, Reykjavik, Iceland, 2022
- Bakery Photographic Collective, Westbrook, ME, 2009

== Bibliography ==
- Delaney Hoffman, “SHE TELLS ALL: Practice and Portraiture”, photoeye.com, Feb. 3, 2022
- Johanna Drucker, “Illuminating Images: Liquid Light and Golden Hour and the Affective Force of Non-Didactic Art”, Riot Material, Jan. 7, 2022
- Jessica Hundley and Pam Grossman, “Divination: Seeing Within,” in The Library of Esoterica: Witchcraft, Jessica Hundley and Pam Grossman, ed., (Taschen, 2021): 424-425
- Harriet- Lloyd-Smith, “The Every Woman Biennial is a transatlantic triumph,” Wallpaper Magazine, June 14, 2021
- Aline Smithson, “Siri Kaur: SHE TELLS ALL,” Lenscratch, Mar. 19, 2020
- Nate Rynaski, “Siri Kaur, SHE TELLS ALL,” Flaunt Magazine, Oct. 29, 2019
- Shana Nys Dambrot, “Meet an Artist Monday: Siri Kaur,” LA Weekly, Oct 28, 2019
- “Art & Life with Siri Kaur”, Voyage LA Magazine, January 2, 2019
- Serena McKay, “Crystal Bridges exhibit aims to lasso truth of heroes’ roots,” Arkansas Democrat Gazette, Little Rock, AR, Feb. 9, 2019
- Peter Saenger, “Supermen and Wonder Women: Artists reimagine comic-book heroes with admiration and irreverence”, The Wall Street Journal, New York, NY, January 19-20, 2019. C14
- Caleb Talley, “Men of Steel, Women of Wonder,” About You Magazine, Jan. 24, 2019
- Rebecca Morse, “Institutionally Antiestablishment,” in 27 L.A. Photographers, Rebecca Morse, ed., (Los Angeles County Museum of Art Press, 2018): 6-12, 30-31
- Gwynedd Stuart, “LACMA Celebrates 10 Years of Urban Light with a Beautiful Photo Series,” Los Angeles Magazine, February 9, 2018
- Taylor Curry, “Siri Kaur,” Ain’t Bad Magazine, January 28, 2018
- Genie Davis, “Siri Kaur and Rebecca Bird at Kopeikin Gallery,” Art and Cake, April 16, 2017
- Josh Hagler, “Other Faiths, Part 1 + 2” Venison Quarterly, Spring 2017
- Holly Hughes, “Memories of Crow’s Field,” Photo District News, March 13, 2017
- Aline Smithson, “Siri Kaur: Crow’s Field, “Lenscratch, March 11, 2017
- Kristen Osborne-Bartucca, “Siri Kaur,” Artillery Magazine, Jan/ Feb 2015, p. 70
- Shana Nys Dambrot, “Top Ten Critic’s Picks of 2014,” art ltd., Jan/ Feb 2015, p. 51
- Catherine Opie, “Vanity: a special section curated by Catherine Opie,” Musee Magazine, Issue 11, April 2015, p. 290-291
- Matthew Stromberg, “Photo LA,” Hyperallergic, Jan. 19, 2015
- Ken Weingart, “Interview with Photographer Siri Kaur,” petapixel.com, February 19, 2015
- Christine Santa Ana and Phil Anderson, Of the Afternoon, Issue 6 (September 2014): 30
- Christina Procter, “Zealous Eyes,” Trend art +design +architecture Magazine, Issue 1, June 2014, p. 18
- Thea Traff, “Seeing Double,” The New Yorker, November 26, 2014
- Bill Bush, “Falling From Great Heights,” Huffington Post, March 26, 2013
- Paul Caridad, “Film Photography of Galaxies through a Telescope,” Visual News, May 14, 2013
- Amanda Gorence, “Ethereal Photos of Distant Galaxies,” Feature Shoot, May 14, 2013
- Nicholas Grider, “Crow’s Field,” Public Display Magazine, March 2013
- Catlin Moore, “Emergent Presence: Siri Kaur” in Eight LA Artists You Should Know, Fabrik Magazine, Issue 20, April 2013. 44-45
- A. Moret, “Siri Kaur,” Installation Magazine, “California” Issue (July 2013): 8
- Holly Myers, “Photographs that Say ‘yes/and’,” The Los Angeles Times, Los Angeles, CA, April 26, 2013. D16
- Bianca Rocco, “Siri Kaur Captures the Galaxies: Telescope Photography,” Quixote, August 14, 2013
- Matt Stromberg, “Outer Spaces, Los Angeles: Falling from Great Heights,” Art Practical, April 14, 2013
- Maya Sugarman, “The Color of Space,” Audiovision, KPCC.org, May 9, 2013
- Phil Tarley, “Cohen Gallery Exhibition: Falling from Great Heights,” Fabrik Magazine, Issue 20, April 2013. 68-73
- Westerbeck, Colin, “All Together Now! Themes and Shared Concerns in Staking Claim: A California Invitational,” in Staking Claim: A California Invitational, Chantel Paul, ed., (Museum of Photographic Arts Press, San Diego, 2011): 4–7
- Leonardo Bravo, “Big City Forum: Interview with Soo Kim, Siri Kaur, and Christina Ondrus,” KCET’s Artbound, October 22, 2012
- For Your Art, “Big City Forum: The Hub,” October 11, 2012
- Marnie Hanel, “Hella Cool,” Marie Claire 19, issue no. 6 (June 2012): 131
- Natalie Hegert, “Does Photography Matter?,” Artslant, Los Angeles Art Special Edition 2012, January 14, 2012
- A. Moret, “Looking Forward into the Past,” Installation Magazine, In Blank We Trust Issue (May 2012): 28-33
- Daniel Rolnik, “Photo LA,” Argot & Ochre, January 13, 2012
- Artforum.com News, “Portland Art Museum Awards Biennial Prizes,” April 8, 2011
- Edgar Al len Beem, “The Art Forecast: No Shortage of Discoveries in Portland Museum of Art Biennial,” The Forecaster, Portland, ME, April 4, 2011.
- Shana Nys Dambrot, “Fuck Pretty at Robert Berman Gallery,” art ltd., Sep./Oct. 2011. 35.
- Shana Nys Dambrot, “Critic’s Picks Los Angeles: Siri Kaur,” art ltd., Nov./Dec. 2011. 48-49.
- Travis Diehl, “Critic’s Picks,” artforum.com, Feb. 7, 2011
- For Your Art, “Know Me For the First Time,” October 27, 2011
- Peter Frank, “Haiku Review,” The Huffington Post, Aug. 12, 2011
- Daniel Kany, “Every Decade or so, PMA’s Biennial is Extra Special,” Portland Press Herald/ Maine Sunday Telegraph, April 17, 2011. D5
- Bob Keyes, “It’s That Time Again,” Portland Press Herald/ Maine Sunday Telegraph, April 3, 2011. D1-D2
- Annie Larmon and Nicholas Schroder, “Touring the PMA’s Biennial,” The Portland Phoenix, April 13, 2011
- Anne Martens, “Contemporary Art RUHR,” Artillery Magazine, Volume 5 Issue 4, March/April 2011. 42-43
- Thomas Meaney, Menace and Wonder, in “Know Me for the First Time,” (Los Angeles, CA, Icon Books, 2011): 5–8
- Leah Ollman, “Art Review: Siri Kaur at Blythe Projects,” The Los Angeles Times, Nov. 10, 2011. D21
- Portland Press Herald, “Purchase Prizes Awarded at Launching of Art Biennial,” April 7, 2011. B2
- Ray Routhier, “Five Artists Receive Purchase Prizes at Portland Museum of Art 2011
- Biennial Opening,” Portland Press Herald, Portland, ME, April 10, 2011. D2
- Katie Shapiro, “A Poetic Counter-World Photographed by Siri Kaur,” Feature Shoot, Nov. 29, 2011
- Sebastian Smee, “Biennial Hits,” The Boston Globe, Boston, MA, May 8, 2011. B3
- Aline Smithson, “Siri Kaur,” Lenscratch, Thursday, Oct. 20, 2011
- Greg Cookland, “Portland Museum of Art,” New England Journal of Aesthetic Research, October 7, 2010
- Bob Keyes, "Museum of Art Picks 47 Artists for Biennial Show," Portland Press Herald, Portland, ME, October 4, 2010. D3
- Cary Berglund, Interview, NBC Channel 4 News, Los Angeles, CA, April 10, 2009
- Zoe Crosher, “Interrupting the Imaginary Inside the Ship of My Imagination,” Art Lies Quarterly, no.61 (Spring 2009): 24–27
- Laurel Ptak, “Siri Kaur,” Iheartphotograph, January 20, 2009
- Laurel Ptak, Iheartphotograph.com, March 10, 2009
- Aline Smithson, lenscratch.com, January 21, 2009
- Page Weary, “Gallery 825,” Artillery Magazine, Los Angeles, CA, 2009
- Peter Mays, “Sustaining Emerging Artist’s Communities,” THE Magazine, Los Angeles, CA, October 2008
- Harris Fogel, “Thoughts On Photography,” Houston Center for Photography Quarterly, Winter 2007
- John Rabe & Queena Kim, Interview, Offramp, 89.3 KPCC, Los Angeles, CA, January 6, 2007
- Jay DeFoore, “Emerging Photographers,” American Photo, June 2006
- Curtis Clarkson, CMYK Magazine #31, New York, NY, 2005. 41
- Curtis Clarkson, CMYK Magazine #30, New York, NY, 2005. 48
- Joerg Colberg, “Siri Kaur: Contemporary Photographers,” Conscientious, October 7, 2005
- Jessica Dawson, “Through A Lens Starkly,” The Washington Post, Washington, D.C., June 16, 2005. C5
- John Motley, “New Photography,” The Portland Mercury, Portland, OR, 2005
- Holly Hughes, “Photo Annual,” Photo District News, May 2005. 157

== Publications as author ==
- “This Kind of Face,” (Los Angeles, CA, Leroy Press, 2014)
- “Tanja Hollander: A Photographer’s Attempt to Photograph 687 Facebook Friends,” Feature Shoot, June 20, 2013
- “Heather Rasmussen: Photographer Recreates Disasters and Accidents Involving Shipping Containers,” Feature Shoot, June 24, 2013
- “Know Me for the First Time,” (Los Angeles, CA, Icon Books, 2011)
- “Siri Kaur,” in 2011 Portland Museum of Art Biennial, Mark Bessire, ed., (Portland Museum of Art Press, Portland, ME, 2011): 64–65
- “Do You Want to Make a Picture Book?,” Words Without Pictures, Alex Klein, ed. (New York, NY, Aperture, 2010): 172–174
- “Il Sogno del Paradiso Terrestre: Il Poema Pastorale e il Giardino nel Rinascimento Italiano (Dream of an Earthly Paradise: Pastoral Poetry and the Garden in the Italian Renaissance),” (Northampton, MA, Smith College Press, 2001)

== Academic appointments ==
- 2021–2022 Visiting faculty, School of Arts and Architecture, University of California Los Angeles, Los Angeles, CA
- 2014–2018 Associate professor, Fine Arts and Foundation Programs, Otis College of Art and Design, Los Angeles, CA
- 2010–2014 Assistant professor, Fine Arts and Foundation Programs, Otis College of Art and Design, Los Angeles, CA
- 2007–2010 Visiting lecturer, Fine Art and Foundation Programs, Otis College of Art and Design, Los Angeles, CA
- 2005–2007 Teaching assistant, Foundation Photography, California Institute of the Arts, Valencia, CA
