= Dirk Braeckman =

Belgian photographer

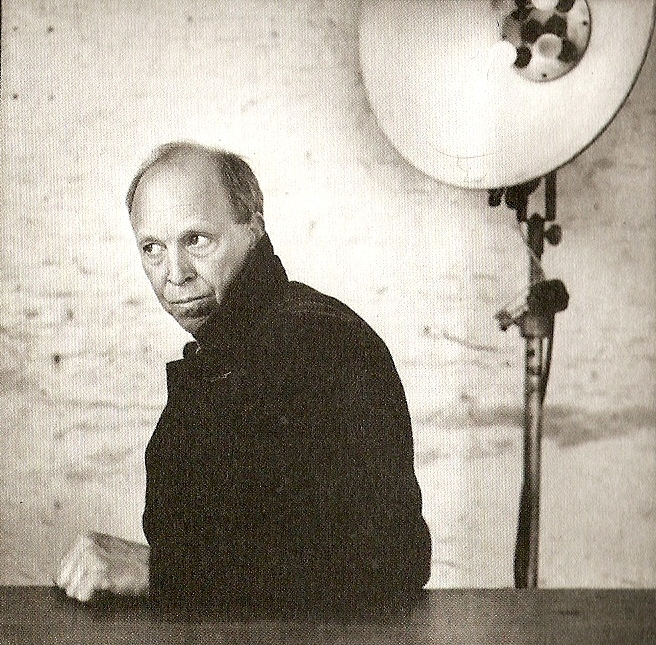
- Dirk Braeckman (2012)
- Born: 1958 (age 67–68); Eeklo, Belgium
- Occupation: Photographer

Dirk Braeckman (born 1958 in Eeklo, Belgium) is a Belgian photographer who lives and works in Ghent, Belgium. The artist studied photography and film at the Royal Academy of Fine Arts in Ghent from 1977 until 1981.

== Photography career ==
In addition to his photographic body of work, Braeckman creates site specific installations, for varying projects such as Beaufort in Ostend or Watou's art and poetry festival. Recently a permanent installation of a monumental photowork (of which a facsimile is now presented at Robert Miller's Gallery) has been inaugurated at the new Concert Hall of Bruges.

In 2002 he was granted the cultural award of the University of Louvain and received the Cultural Prize of the Flemish Community, Section Fine Arts in 2005. Braeckman's images have appeared in numerous magazines, books and catalogues. Most recently in the Photo Art book, published by Dumont, Thames & Hudson and Aperture. In 2017 Braeckman represented Belgium at the Venice Biennale.

== Publications ==
Braeckman has published two artist's books, z.Z(t). I and z.Z(t) II. The abbreviation in the title stands for the German expression zur Zeit, which means "for now", "at this very moment". On his commission for the Belgian Royal Palace he published the book Chiaroscuro.

== Bibliography ==
- Dirk Braeckman, Dirk Braeckman, Roma Publications, Amsterdam 2011, ISBN 978-90-77459-67-6
