= Anthony Hernandez (photographer) =

American photographer (born 1947)

- Born: 1947 (age 78–79); Los Angeles
- Education: Roosevelt High School; East Los Angeles College
- Spouse: Judith Freeman
- Military career
- Branch: United States Army
- Service years: 1967-1969
- Website: anthonyhernandezphotography.com

Anthony Hernandez (born 1947) is an American photographer who divides his time between Los Angeles, his birthplace, and Idaho. His photography has ranged from street photography to images of the built environment and other remains of civilization, particularly those discarded or abandoned elements that serve as evidence of human presence. He has spent most of his career photographing in Los Angeles and environs. "It is L.A.'s combination of beauty and brutality that has always intrigued Hernandez." La Biennale di Venezia said of Hernandez, "For the past three decades a prevalent question has troubled the photographer: how to picture the contemporary ruins of the city and the harsh impact of urban life on its less advantaged citizens?" His wife is the novelist Judith Freeman.

== Early life and career formation ==
Hernandez was born in Los Angeles to Mexican immigrants, and his family lived near Aliso Village, a housing project in East Los Angeles, before moving to Boyle Heights at about the age of four. He traces his introduction to photography to a textbook a friend gave him when he was a senior at Roosevelt High School. His first camera was a 35mm Nikon purchased with money he won in a raffle. He took basic photography courses while attending East Los Angeles College from 1966-1967, though he is largely self-taught. A close aunt recognized and nurtured Hernandez's artistic talents, introducing him to jazz music and providing him a subscription to Artforum magazine, which the artist regards as an early influence on his artistic development. The photographer also cites Edward Weston as an important influence, which is reflected in Hernandez's first formal series: a set of photographs take on southern California beaches in 1969-1970. Hernandez regards the work of Lewis Baltz. as having the closest alignment to his own.

His earliest images are of parts and machinery left in an empty lot near an automobile repair shop close to his home, foreshadowing the development of common subjects of his work: urban decay and abandoned detritus. Hernandez began to devote his time to photography after serving in the United States Army from 1967-1969 (he served as a medic in the Vietnam War in 1968). In the summer of 1969, he took a workshop with Lee Friedlander, and in 1970 he built his own darkroom in an apartment he rented in the Westlake area of Los Angeles. In the same year, Hernandez's work was included in his first museum exhibition and publication, California Photographers, 1970, a survey of new photography from the state. The 1971 exhibition and publication, The Crowded Vacancy, is regarded as being seminal in launching the photographer's career. In 1970 Hernandez presented a portfolio of images to John Szarkowski, curator of photographs at the Museum of Modern Art, who purchased two photographs for the museum and also introduced him to the photographers Dianne Arbus, Duane Michals, and Garry Winogrand.

== Early street work ==
Starting in 1969, his work is defined by 35 mm black-and-white street photography (mainly portraiture) in Los Angeles and Hollywood that established a distinctive style characterized by subjects who appear alienated and "overwhelmed by unseen forces." One critic remarked that these compositions show a "peculiar state of stasis." Writing about his 1976 pictures of Washington, D.C., a critic observed that the photographs present an "original photographic approach" that captures an unusual state of animation—even "disequilibrium"—with his subjects simultaneously "energized and abstracted." His early work shows the influence of Garry Winogrand.

In the late 1970s Hernandez began to use a Deardorff 5x7 view camera, which changed the character of his work. Between 1978 and 1983 he continued to make images of prosaic elements of Los Angeles street life and public spaces, but the wider orientation of the view camera resulted in people taking a less prominent place in his pictures while augmenting the presence of the built environment. These pictures represent a fusion of street and landscape photographic traditions and offer energized and animated compositions unusual for view camera work. Many of the images suggest darker social realities. A series from this period, "Public Transit Areas," focuses on city bus stops, and was complemented by related bodies of work, including "Public Use Areas," "Public Fishing Areas," and "Automotive Landscapes." Some of these pictures have been likened to the aesthetic of the New Topographics genre . Collectively these series offer rare examples in any art form that depict the day-to-day lives of the poor and working class of Los Angeles.

In 1984–1985, responding to a suggestion from an art director at Los Angeles magazine, he shifted to color work with a series of 35 mm close-up street portraits of shoppers taken on Rodeo Drive. He used the same zone focus technique he had used in his earliest street work whereby the camera is pre-focused for a set distance, allowing for quick capture. Even so, they adopt some of the same deliberateness and formalness of his view camera work. He also chose to use transparency film and printed in Cibachrome to accentuate the color. Hernandez commented that these portraits are more intimate than his earlier street portraits. The images explore a complex mélange of consumerism, class, self-presentation, fantasy, sexuality, and photographic representation, and the artist regards them as his first successful color photographs. Hernandez stopped photographing people after this project, and it marked the beginning of his exclusive use of color photography.

== Artistic shift and later work ==
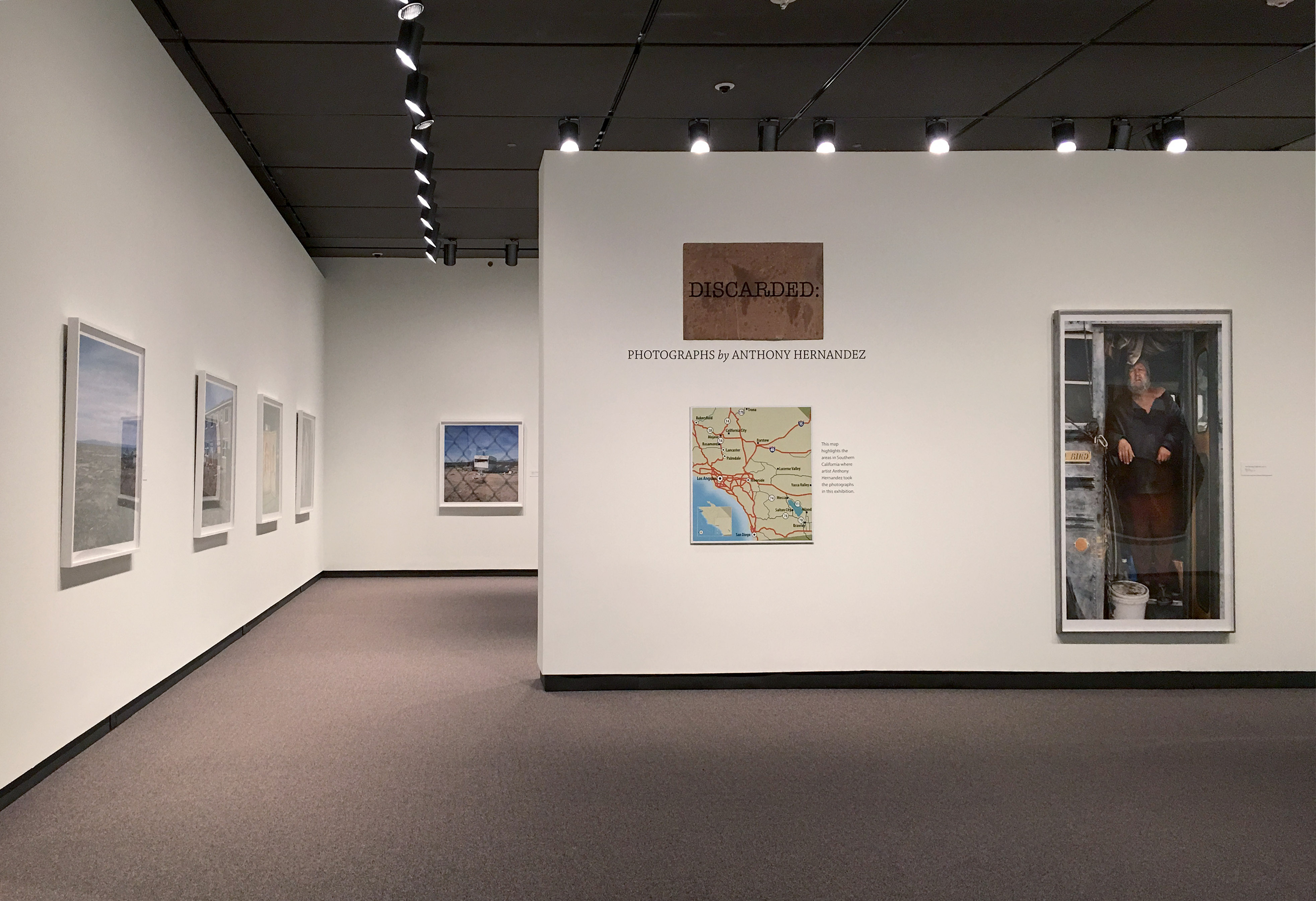
Installation View of Discarded: Photographs by Anthony Hernandez exhibition at the Amon Carter Museum of American Art

In 1986, as artist-in-residence at the University of Nevada in Las Vegas, Hernandez photographed an array of spent shells and exploded debris left over at a target range—absent of the shooters. He continued this project after the residency and added shooting ranges located in the Angeles National Forest. This series, "Shooting Sites," signaled a shift in his artistic vision toward capturing scenes suggesting abandonment and desolation absent of human players yet charged with intrigue about their involvement. The pictures also reveal another signature tactic of his compositions, which is to offer visual allure that draws a viewer into troubling subject matter. The photographer likens this series with his earlier "Automobile Landscapes."

His "Landscapes for the Homeless" series, which he produced from 1988–1991, captured images of homelessness sites located near and under Los Angeles freeways, focusing exclusively on the inhabitants' makeshift shelters and discarded refuse nearby. This suite of photographs was unique in their focus on the evidence of homelessness, and Hernandez struggled to get them published and exhibited in the United States. A critic described the images as both "forensic and poetic." This work was the basis of his first solo museum exhibition and his first monograph.

The photographer has said that both "Shooting Sites" and "Landscapes for the Homeless" connect to his experience serving as a medic in the Vietnam War.

"Pictures for Rome," a series Hernandez made from 1998–1999 under the auspices of the Rome Prize, eschews views of classic structures in favor of details of abandoned buildings and incomplete office structures located on the periphery of the city. He used the same square format he had used for his "Landscapes of the Homeless" pictures, and they were his first images taken indoors.

His "Pictures for Oakland" (2001) and "Pictures for L.A." (2000–2002) document various states of construction and disintegration of buildings, the latter including the Walt Disney Concert Hall, Belmont Learning Center, and Aliso Village.

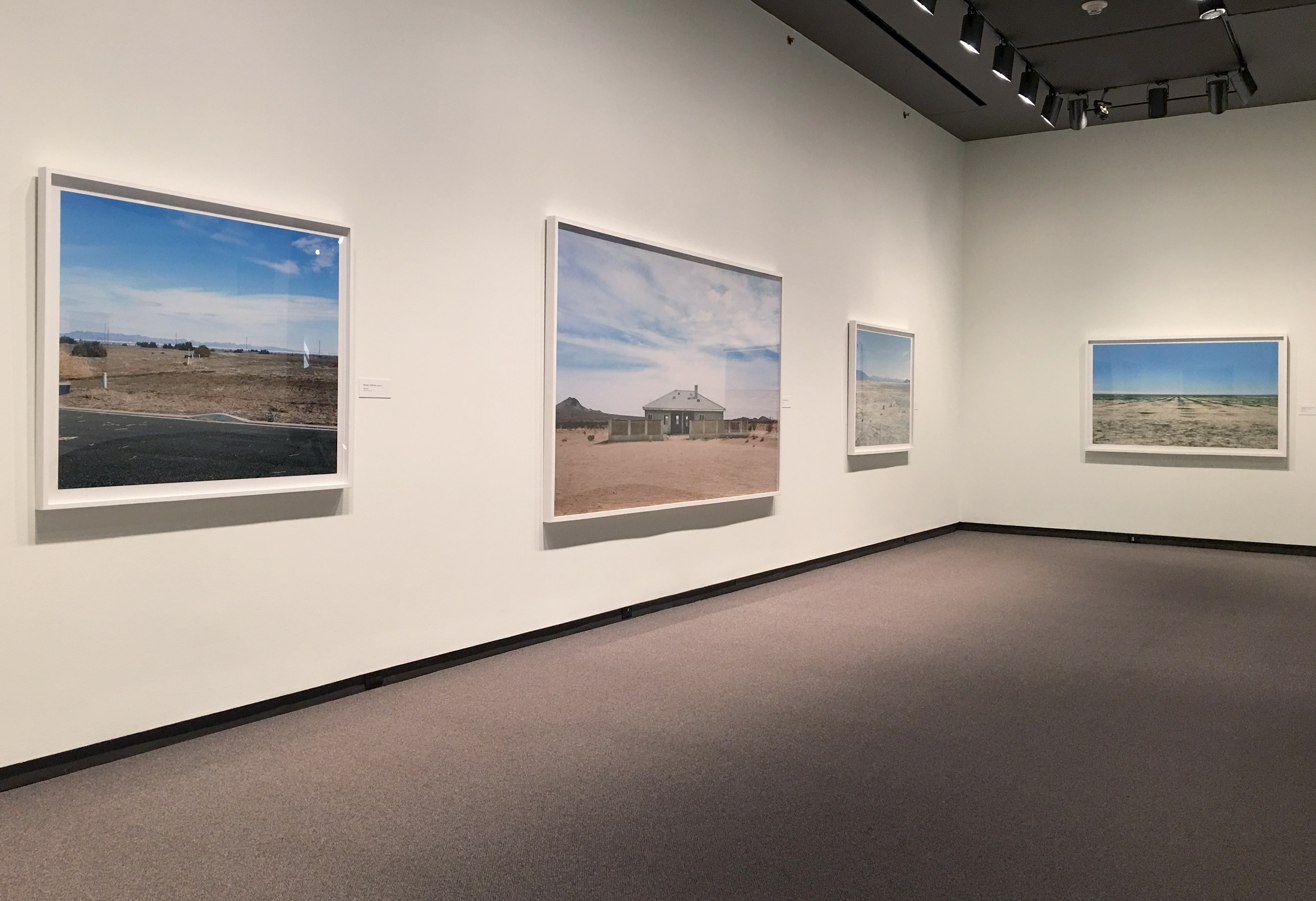
Installation View of Discarded: Photographs by Anthony Hernandez exhibition at the Amon Carter Museum of American Art

A body of work associated with the Los Angeles River created from January 2003–May 2004, "Everything," explores the river and environs—areas near Hernandez's boyhood home—in a series of color still lifes of flotsam and jetsam situated in or near the river. These images function concurrently as color and form studies, and as commentary on societal relationships with the discarded objects.

In a series Hernandez shot from 2007–2012, Forever, he revisits homeless sites, yet changes the perspective to one of looking out from within an encampment.

In "Discarded," 2012–2015, Hernandez comments on the aftermath of the subprime mortgage crisis in his austere color photographs of abandoned houses and other remains located in residential subdivisions in the desert east of Los Angeles. This series marks the return of people to his images, including at least one portrait.

"Screen Pictures" (2017-2018) is a series of city portraits of Los Angeles that were photographed through the metal mesh of bus stops. The depicted places look abstract. The human figures present blur due to the abstraction that results from the capture through the metal mesh and the focus on it. Only when you look closely, you see what the pictures actually depict: a tent on the edge of a lawn, a lonely figure walking past a gas station, and various architectural details throughout the city. The photos recall certain aspects of Hernandez 'earlier series, but now show them from a different perspective. A selection of the photos, along with a selection from "Pictures for Rome," can be seen in 2019 in the exhibition May You Live In Interesting Times, which is part of the Venice Art Biennale. He similarly used a custom metal screen on a tripod in a series of photographs taken of Camas Prairie, exploring the screen's capability to render an impressionist-like image of the landscape.

Hernandez continues to use film cameras, though his prints are digitally produced. Although his recent "Screened Pictures," due to the grid and the abstraction, have a "digital appearance", they have all been photographed on film and not been digitally manipulated.

== Publications ==
- Anthony Hernandez. 1976.
- Landscapes for the Homeless. 1995.
- Sons of Adam - Landscapes for the Homeless 2. 1997.
- Pictures for Rome. 2000.
- Waiting for Los Angeles. 2002.
- Everything. 2005.
- Waiting, Sitting, Fishing, and Some Automobiles: LA. 2007.
- Anthony Hernandez. 2009.
- East Baltimore. 2010.
- Rodeo Drive, 1984. 2012.
- L.A., 1971. 2014.
- Discarded. 2016.
- Beach Pictures, 1969-70. 2016.
- Anthony Hernandez. 2016.
- Forever. London: Mack, 2017. ISBN 9781910164211.
- From the Colour of its Bloom: Camas Prairie. Catalog of a group exhibition held at Sun Valley Museum of Art, Sun Valley, Idaho, July 10-September 10, 2020

== Selected solo exhibitions ==
- 1976: The Nation's Capital in Photographs, The Corcoran Gallery of Art, Washington, D.C.
- 1978: Art in Public Places, Orange Coast College, Costa Mesa, California; Federal Building, Los Angeles, California; Max Protetch Gallery, Washington, D.C.
- 1979: [Exhibition Title Not Known], The University of California at Santa Barbara, California
- 1983: Public Use Areas, California Museum of Photography, Riverside, California
- 1983: Anthony Hernandez: Recent Work, California Museum of Photography, Riverside, California
- 1984: [Exhibition Title Not Known], Susan Spiritus Gallery, Newport Beach, California
- 1985: Rodeo Drive, Burden Gallery, New York, New York
- 1985: Rodeo Drive, Northlight Gallery, Arizona State University, Tempe, Arizona
- 1990: Landscapes for the Homeless, The Opsis Foundation, New York, New York
- 1991: Shooting Sites, Turner/Krull Gallery, Los Angeles, California
- 1993: Landscapes for the Homeless, Turner/Krull Gallery, Los Angeles, California
- 1995: Landscapes for the Homeless, The Sprengel Museum, Hanover, Germany
- 1995: In Another World, Craig Krull Gallery, Santa Monica, California
- 1996: Landscapes for the Homeless, Musée de l'Elysée, Lausanne, Switzerland
- 1997: Landscapes for the Homeless, Centre national de la photographie, Paris, France
- 1997: Shooting Sites, Galerie Polaris, Paris, France
- 1997: The City, Craig Krull Gallery, Santa Monica, California
- 1998: The 70's, Dan Bernier Gallery, Los Angeles, California
- 1999: City Point–Rome, Galeries Polaris, Paris, France
- 2000: Pictures for Rome, Grant Selwyn Fine Art, New York, New York
- 2000: Pictures for Rome, Grant Selwyn Fine Art, Beverly Hills, California
- 2001: After LA, Galerie Polaris, Paris, France
- 2001: Pictures for Oakland, California College of Arts and Crafts, Oakland, California
- 2001: Pictures for Marghera, Galerie Polaris, Paris, France
- 2001: Pictures for Oakland, Laguna Art Museum, Laguna, California
- 2002: Pictures for LA, Grant Selwyn Fine Art, New York, New York
- 2002: Pictures for LA, Galerie Polaris, Paris, France
- 2002: Temporary Space, Seattle Art Museum, Seattle, Washington
- 2003: Pictures for LA, Grant Selwyn Fine Art, Los Angeles, California
- 2004: Everything, Anthony Grant Gallery, New York, New York
- 2004: Everything, Christopher Grimes Gallery, Santa Monica, California
- 2006: Beverly Hills, 1984 & Broadway, Christopher Grimes Gallery, Santa Monica, California
- 2008: Anthony Hernandez: the Seventies and Eighties, The Sheldon Art Galleries, St. Louis Missouri
- 2007: Anthony Hernandez, Christopher Grimes Gallery, Santa Monica, California
- 2009: Anthony Hernandez, Vancouver Art Gallery, Vancouver, Canada
- 2016: Discarded: Photographs by Anthony Hernandez, Amon Carter Museum of American Art, Fort Worth, Texas
- 2016-2017: Anthony Hernandez, San Francisco Museum of Modern Art, San Francisco, California
- 2017: Anthony Hernandez, Galerie Thomas Zander, Cologne, Germany
- 2017: Anthony Hernandez, Yancey Richardson, New York, New York
- 2019: Anthony Hernandez. A confusing gaze, Fundación MAPFRE Bárbara de Braganza Exhibition Hall, Madrid, Spain
- 2019: Anthony Hernandez. L.A. Landscapes, The Nelson-Atkins Museum of Art, Kansas City, Missouri
- 2019: Anthony Hernandez, Kayne, Griffin, Corcoran Gallery, Los Angeles, California
- 2019: Venice Biennale

== Awards ==
- 1972: Ferguson Grant, Friends of Photography, Carmel, California
- 1975: Artist-in-Residence, Corcoran Gallery of Art, Washington, D.C.
- 1975: National Endowment for the Arts Fellowship
- 1978: National Endowment for the Arts Fellowship
- 1979: Artist-in-Residence, Seattle Arts Commission, Seattle, Washington
- 1980: National Endowment for the Arts Fellowship
- 1983: Artist-in-Residence, Light Work, Syracuse, New York
- 1985–1986: Artist-in-residence, University of Nevada, Las Vegas
- 1998: Higashikawa Prize, Japan
- 1998–1999: Rome Prize Fellowship, American Academy in Rome
- 2001: Artist-in-residence, Capp Street Project, San Francisco, California
- 2016: Lucie Award in Achievement in Fine Arts category

== Public collections ==
Hernandez's work is held in the following public collections:

- Bibliothèque nationale de France, Paris
- Center for Creative Photography, Tucson, Arizona
- Dallas Museum of Art, Dallas, Texas
- Fotomuseum Winterthur, Switzerland
- J. Paul Getty Museum, Los Angeles, California
- Solomon R. Guggenheim Museum, New York
- Harry Ransom Center, The University of Texas at Austin, Austin, Texas
- Higashikawa Museum, Hokkaido, Japan
- International Museum of Photography, George Eastman House, Rochester, New York
- Los Angeles County Museum of Art, Los Angeles, California
- Metropolitan Museum of Art, New York
- Museum of Fine Arts, Houston, Houston, Texas
- Museum of Modern Art, New York, New York
- Museum of Photographic Arts, San Diego, California
- Norton Simon Museum, Pasadena, California
- Oakland Museum, Oakland, California
- San Francisco Museum of Modern Art, San Francisco, California
- Smithsonian American Art Museum, Washington, D.C.
- Sprengel Museum, Hannover, Germany
- Whitney Museum of American Art, New York
- University of California at Davis, Davis, California
- University of Kansas Museum of Art, Lawrence, Kansas
- Corcoran Gallery of Art, Washington, D.C.
- Amon Carter Museum of American Art, Fort Worth, Texas
