= Zhang Dali =

Chinese graffiti artist (born 1963)

Zhang Dali Chinese: 张大力
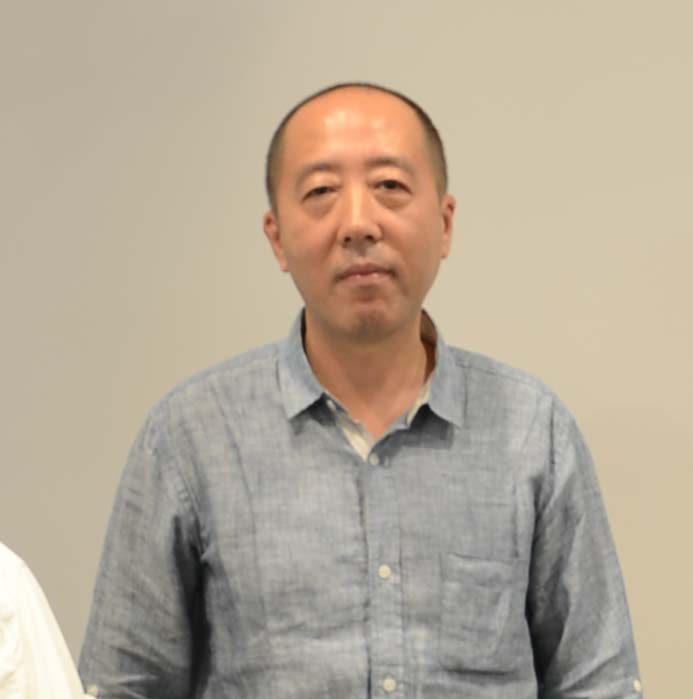
- Born: 1963 (age 62–63); Harbin, China
- Website: www.zhangdaliart.com/en

Zhang Dali (Chinese: 张大力, born 1963, in Harbin, China) is an artist based in Beijing.

Zhang trained at the Central Academy of Fine Arts and Design, where he graduated in 1987. After his studies, he moved to Yuanmingyuan as a freelance artist (1987–1989) and started to show his works in independent exhibitions. He spent the years 1990–1995 in Italy, where he came into contact with graffiti art. He was the only graffiti artist in Beijing throughout the 1990s. His works cross a multitude of techniques including painting, sculpture, photography, and installations. In the four decades of his career his works were shown in more than 300 exhibitions all over the world.

== Biography ==
From 1995 to 1998 he spray-painted over 2000 giant profiles of his own bald head on buildings throughout Beijing, placing the images alongside chāi (拆) characters painted by the city authorities to indicate that a building is scheduled for demolition. The appearance of these images became the subject of media debate in Beijing in 1998.

He has shown work internationally in many exhibitions including the Museum of Modern Art (MoMA) in New York, International Center for Photography in New York City, Les Rencontres d'Arles festival in France (2010), 18Gallery in Shanghai, Magda Danysz Gallery in Paris, Courtyard Gallery in Beijing, Institute of Contemporary Arts in London, Kunstnernes Hus in Oslo, the 2006 Gwangju Biennale in Korea and Pékin Fine Arts in Beijing. He is represented by Pékin Fine Arts in Beijing, Kiang Gallery in Atlanta, Klein Sun Gallery in New York City and Base Gallery in Tokyo.

In more recent years, his works were shown in large retrospective exhibitions such as: "From Reality to Extreme Reality" at the United Art Museum in Wuhan (2015), "Body and Soul" at Beelden aan Zee in The Hague (2017), "Meta-morphosis" at Palazzo Fava in Bologna (2018).

== Main works ==
=== Human World Red, Black, and White Series ===
These paintings in red, black and white are executed with oil colors, typical of western art, but on vertical paper with the dimensions and shapes, typical of Chinese traditional scroll painting. The subject is figurative, precise elements can be recognized, but at the same time not realistic. It seems like the representation of a dream, of a spiritual aspiration, of harmony between the natural and human worlds. The well-defined lines and the choice of colors refer to graphic art, which was also an essential part of Zhang's curriculum at the academy.

This series of oil on paper paintings are representative of Zhang Dali's last university years (1986–1987) and of his search for contamination between eastern and western art. Zhang Dali has already decided that he wants to be a “contemporary artist” and not a Chinese traditional painting artist. The education he received at the Central Academy of Fine Arts and Design in Beijing includes the study of European and Chinese classic art, and the study of the most influential movements of western art in the twentieth century, from Bauhaus to Pop Art.

" Formally, I have been deeply influenced by Wu Guanzhong. I was shocked the first time I saw Wu’s paintings, he used red to paint green trees. We were all shocked and thought he was colorblind. We told him the tree was green and he replied: “The tree is green, but can’t we paint it with other colors? You should paint with the color that expresses your inner most feelings.” It was then that I realized that the portrayal of natural setting landscapes and objects didn’t have to correspond to their actual form but could refer to my inner emotions. " Zhang Dali in conversation for Asia Art Archive, Contemporary Chinese Art from 1980 to 1990, 2000

=== Dialogue and Demolition ===
Zhang Dali's encounter with graffiti first occurred in Europe. From 1989 to 1995, while he was living in Bologna, graffiti art presented itself as a means of dialogue between the artist and the people moving in the urban landscape. His first graffiti were painted in Bologna, and other European cities: Vienna, Ljubljana, Berlin. After returning to China in 1995, he witnessed the demolition of old alleys and neighborhoods, the forced relocation of the inhabitants and the propaganda to convince the citizens that “modernization” is good and necessary. He then started to wander the streets by night, on his bicycle with a spray can, leaving on the walls condemned to demolition a head profile and his signature AK-47 and 18K.

In a project that will last a decade, Zhang Dali not only establishes a dialogue with the city's inhabitants, he also asks questions about the legitimacy of modernization, about the costs for the historical and cultural heritage, and the price of physical and psychological suffering. His graffiti were the spark which became a great conflagration in the public debate on the significance, modes and finality of urban modernization. With his graffiti, Zhang Dali turned into a public intellectual renown in China and all over the world.

" Urban expansion and its ambiguous spread fill us with excitement, unease and disquiet. Each and every corner of the city is a chaotic mess. Mounds of garbage are piling up and people eat, shit and sleep amongst the refuse. Children look for toys in the debris. River water runs ink black and stinks like hell, while plastic bags hang from tree branches and play catch on the grass, nodding and waving in the breeze like severed heads and hands. Men in pressing business suits enter the main gates of fancy hotels, while rivers of filth run from the hotels’ rear. " Zhang Dali, Demolition – Continuing Dialogue, February 1998 in Zhang Dali, Wuhan United Art Museum 2015

=== AK-47 ===
AK-47 is the name of an automatic rifle designed by Michail Kalashnikov, from whose name comes the abbreviation of AK (Avtomat Kalashnikova) and was produced for the first time in the Soviet Union in 1947. All over the world, the name AK-47 has become a symbol of wars, insurrections and gang criminality. Zhang Dali started to use this tag during the nineties in his graffiti as a synonym of the violence permeating the fast urbanization process.

From the year 2000, he started a series of portraits emerging from the chromatic contrast of "AK-47"s' shades. The paintings are acrylic on vinyl, a material widely used for advertisement boards, a feature becoming an integral part of the Beijing’s urban landscape in those years. The faces are copied from portrait photos Zhang Dali found in a pile of abandoned photo studio archives, sold in bulk at the flea market. The acronym is not painted on the faces, but it is used to portray the faces themselves: violence is not “on” people, it is the very material with which people are made of, not a washable coating, but integral part and connecting tissue of their existence.

=== Slogan ===
This is a series of portraits emerging from the repetition and color shade contrast of Chinese characters, similar to the "AK-47", but now belonging to the slogans. In the year preceding the 2008 Beijing Olympic Games, the capital was invaded by gigantic banners and boards of government propaganda slogans. Even though this feature has always been a part of Chinese urban and rural landscapes, so much so to become invisible to the passer-by eyes, in 2008 their presence was so ubiquitous to make Zhang Dali ponder on their meaning and on the subtle message implanted in people's head.

" In 2000 I started the series AK-47. At the time I thought I was expressing the violence to which people are subjected to in society because of inequality. The Slogan series is a continuation of AK-47, and it is also the result of my observation of our own surrounding society. Our era is full of dramatic events and fast changes, in the main avenues and narrow alleys slogans are pervasive and ever changing. These slogans are standard sentences taken from government documents that have come to dominate our public space. Their aim is to educate us, tell us how we must behave just like a parent talking to an elementary school child – in the same way the parents of the People lecture their immature children. " Zhang Dali, Slogan Artist’s Statement, 2008

=== Chinese Offspring ===
Zhang Dali's research on human bodies as a collective depository of an era continues in this series of sculptures, cast in fiberglass from migrant workers. From 2004 to 2010, he has reproduced the bodies of farmers coming into the city in search of work; they became the document of both a specific period in the history of urbanization and a migration of unimaginable proportion. From the first exhibitions, the sculptures were hung upside down, to express the absence of control these people have on their lives. The name Chinese Offspring demands us to reflect on the present condition of a People who had lost the values of the wise men and heroes of the past, a People reduced to a sub-human state, cogs in a machine on which they have no control on, lacking ideals and without a purpose that goes beyond daily subsistence.

=== A Second History ===
A Second History was created in a seven-year span, from 2004 to 2011. Zhang Dali poses questions about the influence of new technologies on the visual mass culture and as a form of exercised power. The research on the history of image manipulation takes him to collecting thousands of illustrated volumes, magazines, and newspapers from the years 1950s to 1980s. He had access to the archives of some of the most known state publication houses, where he compared negative films and images published in those years.

This work consists of the archive created by Zhang Dali after seven years of researching and cataloging. It is made of 133 panels, each comparing images as published with different manipulations and/or their original negative. Image manipulation was born with photography itself. All over the world images are manipulated, in China such practices have been particularly pervasive since the foundation of the People's Republic and is exposed in this work in its political and aesthetical significance.

=== World's Shadows ===
The cyanotype is a type of photogram, a photo produced without a camera. It was invented by John Herschel in 1842 and quickly abandoned in favor of other more sophisticated photographic techniques. The characteristics of the cyanotype attract Zhang Dali for two reasons: it can not be altered or manipulated; it captures the image in a specific instant and it cannot be reproduced. The object and its shadow constitute an intrinsically bound couple and only in a precise instant. Zhang Dali has experimented with large size cyanotypes covering subjects such as natural landscapes, vegetations, and human bodies. This is one of the techniques the artist is still expanding and combining other materials.

" Shadows are very intriguing and differ greatly in form. Besides shadows’ ability to prove existence of material objects, shadows also carry their own intrinsic value and existence, not only as a reproduction or copy of the world of material things, but also as a type of “anti-matter” marking the space material objects occupy under the sun.

The material world shapes and controls our nervous system, and can make us feel agitated and troubled. When we keep calm and quiet we realize that the world under our control is only a small part of the universe, certainly not the whole. The shadows I document exist only for a very short time but through the photogram technique I capture them, so they can exist for a much longer time, in front of our eyes, and under our gaze. "

Zhang Dali, World’s Shadows, Artist’s Statement, 2011

=== Permanence ===
These sculptures in white marble (hanbaiyu) created in 2015 and 2016, represent a new stage of research and elaboration on the relevance of the human body as representative of a society and its dominant ideology. Bodies of common people, migrant laborers are shown to the public as classical statues made of marble, material associated to deities and heroes of the past.

In this new form, they transmigrate from impermanence to permanence, at the same time detaching from their daily reality of ignorance and suffering. Zhang Dali captures the spark of eternity presented in the life of each and every person. It is not the appanage granted to royals and nobles, Sublimity exists in everyone and transforms the bodies into monuments.

== Exhibition history ==
=== Solo exhibitions ===
2019

- "Zhang Dali per Fondantico", Fondanatico, Bologna, Italy

2018

- "Meta-morphosis", Palazzo Fava, Bologna, Italy
- "AK-47 Di Zhang Dali", Art City, S. Giorgio in Poggiale, Bologna, Italy
- "Monumental Nature", Pékin Fine Arts, Beijing, China
- "Beside City! Be Cityside!", Hefei Financial Harbor, Hefei, China

2017

- “Body and Soul”, Beelden aan Zee, The Hague, Holland

2016

- “Permanence and Impermanence – New Works by Zhang Dali”, Beijing Minsheng Art Museum, Beijing, China

2015

- “Zhang Dali – World’s Shadows”, Ludwisburg Kunstverein, Ludwisburg, Germany
- “A Second History”, MACBA - Museum of Contemporary Art Buenos Aires, Buenos Aires, Argentina
- “Under the Sky”, Pékin Fine Arts Gallery, Hong Kong, China
- “From Reality to Extreme Reality - Zhang Dali Retrospective Research Exhibition”, United Art Museum, Wuhan, China

2014

- "Square," Klein Sun Gallery, New York, NY
- “Square”, K Space, Chengdu, China
- “Zhang Dali-permanent exhibition”, Automne Galerie, Bruxelles, Belgium

2013

- “Second History”, Luxun Academy of Fine Arts Museum, Shenyang, China

2012

- “Zhang Dali Retrospective”, Klein Sun Gallery, New York, NY

2011

- “World’s Shadows”, Pékin Fine Arts, Beijing, China
- “Demolition: Second History”, The Charles Shain Library, Connecticut College, New London, CT
- “New Slogan,” Klein Sun Gallery, New York, NY

2010

- “Extreme Reality”, Tank Loft, Chongqing Contemporary Art Center, Chongqing, China
- “Zhang Dali: A Second History”, Guangdong Museum of Art, Guangzhou, China
- “Zhang Dali Solo Show”, Magda Danysz / Bund 18 Gallery, Shanghai, China

2009

- “Pervasion: Works by Zhang Dali (1995-2008)”, He Xiangning Art Museum, Shenzhen, China
- “Il Sogno Proibito della Nuova Cina”, Palazzo Inghilterra, Turin, Italy

2008

- “Slogans”, Kiang Gallery, Atlanta, GA
- “The Road to Freedom”, Red Star Gallery, Beijing, China

2007

- “Chinese Offspring”, Chinese Contemporary Gallery, New York, NY

2006

- “Zhang Dali: Image and Revision in New Chinese Photography”, Janet Wallace Fine Arts Center, Macalester College, St. Paul, MN
- “A Second History”, Ferst Center for the Arts, Georgia Institute of Technology, Atlanta, GA
- “Zhang Dali: A Second History”, Walsh Gallery, Chicago, IL

2005

- “Sublimation”, Beijing Commune Gallery, Beijing, China
- “New Works by Zhang Dali”, Chinese Contemporary Gallery, London, UK

2003

- “AK-47”, Galleria Il Traghetto, Venice, Italy
- “AK-47”, Galleria Gariboldi, Milan, Italy

2002

- “Beijing’s Face”, Base Gallery, Tokyo, Japan
- “Headlines”, Chinese Contemporary Gallery, London, UK

2000

- “AK-47”, The Courtyard Gallery, Beijing, China

1999

- “Dialogue”, Chinese Contemporary Gallery, London, UK
- “Dialogue and Demolition”, The Courtyard Gallery, Beijing, China

1994

- “Rivoluzione e Violenza”, Galleria Studio 5, Bologna, Italy

1993

- “Zhang Dali: Pitture a Inchiostro”, Galleria Studio 5, Bologna, Italy

1989

- “Wash Painting Exhibition by Zhang Dali”, Central Academy of Fine Arts Museum, Beijing, China

=== Selected group exhibitions ===
2020

- “The Logic of Painting”, Shijiazhuang Art Museum, Shijiazhuang, China
- “Four-Dimensional Scenery”, K-Gallery, Chengdu, China
- “Apnea”, NL Museum (online exhibition), Beijing, China

2019

- “New Art History”, Moca, Yinchuan, China
- Golden Panda Photography Awards, Contemporary Image Museum, Chengdu, China
- “A Fairy Tale in Red Times”, National Gallery of Victoria, Melbourne, Australia
- NordArt 2019, Kunstwerk Carlshütte, Büdelsdorf, Germany
- Shenzhen International Beach Sculpture Festival, Golden Sand Beach, Shenzhen, China
- “Bubble-Profile of Time”, Shanghai Urban Planning Exhibition Center, Shanghai, China
- The 8th Dali International Photography Exposition, Dali, China
- “Graffiti-The Prose of Freedom”, China Check Art Museum, Beijing, China
- “180 Years of Photography in China”, Moca, Yinchuan, China
- “A Confrontation of Ideas”, Anren Biennale, Anren, China

2018

- Nord Art 2018, Kunswerk Carlshuerre, Buedelsdorf, Germany
- “Art From The Streets”, ArtScience Museum, Singapore
- “The Fuck Off Generation: Chinese Art In The Post-Mao Era”, Ethan Cohen Gallery, New York, USA
- “Travelers: Stepping into the Unknown”, The National Museum of Art, Osaka, Japan
- “Ambush on All Sides - An Alternative Intervention in Social Vision”, Museum of Sichuan Fine Art Institute, Chongqing, China
- “Herbstsalon ’18 – Brücken Fremder Flüsse”, MDR TV Station, Magdeburg, Germany

2017

- “Street generations(s) 40 years of urban art”, La Condition Publique, Lille, France
- “Working on History. Chinese Photography and the Cultural Revolution”, State Museum, Berlin, Germany

2016

- “Audacious – Contemporary Artists Speak Out”, Denver Art Museum, Denver, USA
- “Utopias Heterotopias”, Wuzhen Silk Factory, Wuzhen, China
- “Subjective Reality”, SheShanMOCA, Shanghai, China
- “An Exhibition about Exhibitions – Displaying Contemporary Art in the 1990s”, OCAT Institute, Beijing, China
- “Street Art – A Global View”, CAFA Art Museum, Beijing, China
- “Busan Biennale”, Busan Museum of Art, Busan, South Korea
- “Vile Bodies”, White Rabbit Gallery, Sydney, Australia
- “Enduring Magnetism”, 1X3 Gallery, Beijing, China
- “Historicode – Scarsity and Supply”, Nanjing, China
- “Chinascape: From Rural to Urban”, Spazioborgogno, Milan, Italy

2015

- “Community Implant Plan”, Chengdu Jinjiang Museum, Chengdu, China
- “Sudden Change of Idea – Chinese and German Conceptual Art Comparative Research Exhibition”, United Museum, Wuhan, China
- “The Persistence of Images”, Red Brick Factory Art District, Guangzhou, China
- “ART PARK”, Art Beijing, Agricultural Exhibition Center of China, Beijing, China
- “Photomonth”, Muzeum Sztuki i Techniki Japonskiej, Krakow, Poland
- “De/constructing China”, Asia Society, New York, USA
- “We are together”, Taikoo Square, Chengdu, China
- “The Civil Power”, Beijing Minsheng Art Museum，Beijing，China
- “Grain to pixel - A story of photography in China”, Shanghai center of photography, Shanghai, China
- “Paradise Bitch”, White Rabbit Gallery, Sydney, Australia
- “Chinese photography - twentieth century and beyond” Three shadows photography art centre，Beijing，China
- “A new dynasty - created in China”, Denmark Aros Art Museum, ARhus, Denmark
- “Agitprop!”, Brooklyn Museum, New York, USA

2014

- “De Heus-Zomers Collection of Chinese Contemporary Art”, Museum Bojimans Van Beuningen, Rotterdam, Holland
- “Chinese Contemporary Photography”, Minsheng Museum, Shanghai, China
- “West Says East Says – Chinese Contemporary Art Research Exhibition”, United Museum, Wuhan, China
- “Chinese Contemporary Photography”, ArtScience Museum &Singapore Photography Festival, Singapore
- “Photography in the Post Media Era”, Lianzhou Photo Festival, Lianzhou, China

2013

- “FUCK OFF 2”, The Groeniger Museum, Groeningen, The Netherlands
- “Voice of the Unseen: Chinese Independent Art 1797/Today”, Arsenale Nord, Venice, Italy
- “The Nature of Things”, Gallery Magda Danysz Shanghai, China
- “Hot Pot: A Taste of Contemporary Chinese Art”, Brattleboro Museum and Art Center, Brattleboro, VT
- “RE-INK: Invitational Exhibition of Contemporary Ink Wash Painting 2000 – 2012”, Hubei Museum of Art, Wuhan, Hubei, China; Today Art Museum, Beijing, China
- "Individual Growth – Momentum of Contemporary Art", Tianjin Art Museum, Tianjin, China
- “Incarnations”, Institut Confucius des Pays de la Loire d’Angers, Angers, France
- "Aura and Post Aura", The First Beijing Photography Biennale, China Millennium Monument, Beijing, China
- "World's Shadows", Photo Phnom Penh 2013, Royal University of Phnom Penh, Phnom Penh, Cambodia
- “Spectacle Reconstruction – Chinese Contemporary Art”, MODEM, Debrecen, Hungary
- “Spectacle Reconstruction”, Budapest Art Museum, Budapest, Hungary
- “Chinese Photography”, Galerie Paris-Beijing, Brussels, Belgium
- “One Square Meter – Situation”, Linda Gallery, Beijing, China
- “Aftermath”, 21c Museum, Louisville, USA

2012

- "OMEN 2012 – Chinese New Art," Shanghai Art Museum (Meishuguan), Shanghai, China
- “Raze”, Peking Fine Arts, Beijing, China
- “Faking It: Manipulating Photography Before Photoshop”, The Metropolitan Museum of Art, New York, NY
- “The Unseen”, The 4th Guangzhou Triennial, Guangdong Museum of Art, Guangzhou, China
- “Body Double: The Figure in Contemporary Sculpture”, The Meijer Gardens and Sculpture Park, Grand Rapids, MI

2011

- “Start from the Horizon: Chinese Contemporary Sculpture Since 1978”, Sishang Art Museum, Beijing, China
- "Guanxi: Contemporary Chinese Art”, Today Art Museum, Beijing, China; Guangdong Museum of Art, Guangzhou, China
- “New Photography 2011”, The Museum of Modern Art, New York, NY
- “Speech Matters”, The 54th International Art Exhibition of the Venice Biennale, Venice, Italy
- “Scenes from Within: Contemporary Art from China", Blackbridge Hall Gallery, Georgia College, Milledgeville, GA
- “Black and White”, Zero Art Museum, Beijing, China
- “The Life and Death of Buildings”, Princeton University Art Museum, Princeton, NJ
- “Relationship”, Guangdong Museum of Art, Guangzhou, China
- “Self Camera”, Changwon Asia Art Festival, Seongsan Art Hall, Changwon, South Korea
- “The Evolving Art”, Academy of Arts & Design at Tsinghua University, Beijing, China

2010

- “Is the World Real?”, 6th Lianzhou International Photo Festival, Lianzhou, China
- “The Original Copy: Photography of a Sculpture, 1839 to Today”, The Museum of Modern Art, New York, NY
- “Exhibition Exhibition”, Castello di Rivoli Museo di Arte Contemporanea, Turin, Italy
- “Four Dimensions”, Hong Kong Photo Festival, Hong Kong
- “Zhang Dali: A Second History”, 41st Edition of Les Recontres d’Arles,” Espace Van Gogh, Arles, France
- “A Decade-Long Exposure”, Central Academy of Fine Arts Museum, Beijing, China
- “Dimensionality”, Red Star Gallery, Beijing, China
- “Great Performance”, Pace Beijing, Beijing, China
- “Ame de Chine”, Magda Danysz Gallery, Paris, France
- “From New York to Beijing: Graffiti - Blogging in the Street - Blade and Zhang Dali”, C-Space, Beijing, China
- “Re-Visioning History”, OV Gallery, Shanghai, China
- “Reshaping History - Chinart from 2000-2009”, National Conference Center, Beijing, China
- “China’s Soul”, Magda Danysz Gallery, Paris, France

2009

- “Chasing Flames”, Klein Sun Gallery, New York, NY
- "Quadrilogy: Conflicting Tales: Subjectivity", DAAD Gallery, Berlin, Germany
- "Calligraffiti: ‘Writing’ in Contemporary Chinese and Chicano Art", Pacific Asia Museum, Pasadena, CA
- “Re-imaging Asia”, The New Art Gallery, Walsall, UK
- “Stairway to Heaven: From Chinese Streets to Monuments and Skyscrapers”, Kansas City Art Institute, Kansas City, MO
- “Chinese Prints”, Pace Prints, New York, NY
- “The Very Condition”, Wall Art Museum, Beijing, China
- “Images from History”, Shenzhen Art Museum, Shenzhen, China
- “Collision”, Central Academy of Fine Arts Museum, Beijing, China
- “Transforming Traditions”, Victoria H. Myhren Gallery, University of Denver, Denver, CO
- “From Style Writing to Art – Street Art Group Show”, 18 Gallery, Shanghai, China

2008

- “Stairway to Heaven: From Chinese Streets to Monuments and Skyscrapers”, Bates College Museum of Art, Lewiston, ME
- “Five Years of Duolun”, Shanghai Duolun Museum of Modern Art, Shanghai, China
- “The Revolution Continues: New Art From China”, Saatchi Museum, London, UK
- “Logan Collection”, San Francisco Museum of Modern Art, San Francisco, CA
- “China Gold”, Musee Maillol, Paris, France
- “Zhang Dali and Shen Shaomin”, Klein Sun Gallery, New York, NY
- “The Avant-Garde in the ‘80s and ‘90s of the Last Century in China”, Groningen Museum, Groningen, The Netherlands
- “Guang Hua Road”, Michael Schultz Gallery, Beijing, China
- “Exquisite Corpse: China Surreal”, M97 Gallery, Shanghai, China
- “Go China!”, Groninger Museum, Groninger, The Netherlands
- “Re-Imagining Asia: Asian Coordinates”, House of World Cultures, Berlin, Germany

2007

- “All of our Tomorrows: The Culture of Camouflage”, Kunstraum der Universität, Lünenburg, Germany
- “Unexpected: Out of Control”, Ku Art Center, Beijing, China
- “China Now”, Cobra Museum of Modern Art, Amsterdam, the Netherlands
- “Red Hot”, Houston Museum of Fine Arts, Houston, TX
- “Three Unitary”, DDM, Shanghai, China
- “La Cina è vicina”, Mediterranea Gallery, Palermo, Italy
- “Past Forward”, Oriental Vista Art Collections, Shanghai, China

2006

- “Radar: Selections from the Collection of Kent and Vicki Logan”, Denver Art Museum, Denver, CO
- “China Now”, Essl Museum, Vienna, Austria
- “Fever Variations”, 6th Gwangju Biennale, Gwangju, South Korea
- “Red Star”, 798 Factory Red Star Gallery, Beijing, China
- “Great Performance”, Max Protetch, New York, NY

2005

- “Wall”, Millennium Museum, Beijing, China
- “Mayfly”, Beijing Commune Gallery, Beijing, China
- “The Game of Realism”, Beijing Commune Gallery, Beijing, China
- “Chinese Contemporary Sculpture Exhibition”, Museum Beelden aan Zee, Scheveningen, The Netherlands

2004

- “Between Past and Future: New Photography and Video from China”, International Center of Photography, New York, NY
- “Between Past and Future: New Photography and Video from China”, Asia Society, New York, NY
- “Between Past and Future: New Photography and Video from China”, Smart Museum of Art, University of Chicago, Chicago, IL
- “Between Past and Future: New Photography and Video from China”, Museum of Contemporary Art, Chicago, IL
- “Between Past and Future: New Photography and Video from China”, Victoria & Albert Museum, London, UK
- “Between Past and Future: New Photography and Video from China”, Seattle Art Museum, Seattle, WA
- “Between Past and Future: New Photography and Video from China”, Haus der Kulturen der Welt, Berlin, Germany
- “Between Past and Future: New Photography and Video from China”, Santa Barbara Museum of Art, Santa Barbara, CA
- “Between Past and Future: New Photography and Video from China”, The Nasher Museum of Art at Duke University, Durham, NC
- “Critical Mass”, Chinese Contemporary Gallery, Beijing, China
- “Me! Me! Me!”, The Courtyard Gallery, Beijing, China

2003

- “The Logan Collection”, Denver Art Museum, Denver, CO
- “China-Germany Art”, Factory 798, Beijing, China
- “Festival Internazionale di Roma”, L'Officina-Arte del Borghetto, Rome, Italy

2002

- “New Photography from China”, The Courtyard Gallery, Beijing, China
- 1st Guangzhou Triennial, Guangdong Museum of Art, Guangzhou, China
- International Photography Festival, Pingyao, China

2001

- “Courtyard Gallery August Group Show”, The Courtyard Gallery, Beijing, China
- “China Art Now”, Singapore Art Museum, Singapore
- “Contemporary Chinese Photography”, Oulu Art Museum, Oulu, Finland
- “Contemporary Chinese Photography”, Finland Museum of Photography, Helsinki, Finland
- “Hot Pot”, Kunstnernes, Oslo, Norway

2000

- “Fuck Off”, Eastlink Gallery, Shanghai, China
- “Artistes Contemporains Chinois”, Musee des Tapisseries, Aix-en-Provence, France
- “Thought Brand Meat Mincer”, Dongsi 8 Tiao Performance, Beijing, China
- “Food as Art”, Club Vogue, Beijing, China
- “Serendipity”, The Japan Foundation Asia Center, Tokyo, Japan

1999

- “Transparence Opacite?”, Valle d’Aosta, Italy
- “Food for Thought”, Eindhoven, The Netherlands
- “Beijing in London”, ICA, London, UK
- “HSIN: a visible spirit”, Cypress College & BC Space Gallery, Cypress, CA
- “The World Is Yours!”, Design Museum Performance, Beijing, China
- “Unveiled Reality-Chinese Contemporary Photography”, Chulalongkom University Museum, Bangkok, Thailand
- “Chinese Contemporary Photography”, Bard College, Red Hook, NY

1998

- “Chinese Artists Group Show”, Chinese Contemporary Gallery, London, UK
- “Chinese Contemporary Photography”, Lehman College, New York, NY
- 11th Tallinn Triennial, Tallinn, Estonia
- “Urbanity”, Wang Shou Temple Art Museum, Beijing, China

1997

- “W ²+ Z ²- Multi-media and video Exhibition”, Gallery of the National Academy of Fine Arts, Beijing, China

1995

- “La Formazione della Terra”, Goethe Institute Gallery, Turin, Italy

1993

- “Arte Deperibile”, Spazio Cultura Navile, Bologna, Italy
- “Zona Internazionale”, Neon Gallery, Bologna, Italy

1992

- “Collettiva Di Artisti Cinesi”, Il Sigillo Gallery, Padova, Italy

1991

- “Pittura su Carta”, Galleria Comunale, Ferrara, Italy

1989

- “Wash Painting Salon in Peking”, Capital Museum, Beijing, China

1987

- “Three Men Show”, Sun Yat Sen Park, Beijing, China

== Bibliography ==
- Zhang Dali Demolition & Dialogue [Paperback] published by Courtyard Gallery, Beijing. Editor: Meg Maggio, 1999
- Q & A: Zhang Dali interview, CNN, Dec 11, 2006
- Archive of Chinese Avant Garde Art, Cornell University
- Wu Hong, Zhang Dali's Dialogue: Conversation with a City in Public Culture – Vol.12, No.3, Fall 2000, pp. 749–768 accessed at - subscription only
- Maurizio Marinelli, 'Walls of Dialogue in the Chinese Space', China Information, No. 18, 2004, pp. 429–462. Available at: http://cin.sagepub.com/content/18/3/429.refs or at: http://www.homeshopbeijing.org/blog/wp-content/uploads/2009/03/marinelli_bj-dialogue_i.pdf
- Maurizio Marinelli, 'Civilising the Citizens: Political Slogans and the Right to the City', Portal, Vol. 9, No. 3, 2012, http://epress.lib.uts.edu.au/journals/index.php/portal/article/view/2540
