= Hubertus von Amelunxen =

German born (1958) philosopher, art historian, photography critic, professor

Hubertus von Amelunxen (born 29 December 1958, Bad Hindelang, Allgäu) is a philosopher, art historian, editor, curator, photography critic, and professor for philosophy of photography and cultural studies. Amelunxen has authored and published several books focusing on the history and theory of photography and has curated several international exhibitions. He served as president and provost at the European Graduate School, based in Saas-Fee, Switzerland, and Valletta, Malta from October 2013 until June 2018.

== Academic career ==
Hubertus von Amelunxen studied Roman languages, German Studies, and Art History in Marburg and Paris. In Paris he visited the lectures by Michel Foucault at the Collège de France and by Jacques Derrida at the École Normale Supérieure. He obtained his Ph.D. in Roman Studies at the University of Mannheim with the thesis Allegory and Photography. Research on French Literature.

Amelunxen started his academic career by lecturing in Basel on time and photography (1991). He became a visiting professor at the University of California, Santa Cruz (1991-1992), representing Victor Burgin. In 1995 he obtained a 5-year tenure at the Muthesius Hochschule for Art and Design in Kiel, where he founded the Center for Interdisciplinary Project Studies. Afterwards, in 2000, he taught at the University of Düsseldorf and at the Royal Academy of Fine Arts (Antwerp). In 2001 he became founding director at the International School of New Media in Lübeck, a position he held until 2005. From 2005 to 2009 he served as rector of the École Européenne Supérieure de l'Image (ÉESI) in Angoulême/Poitiers, France. From 2010 to 2013 he served as president of the Hochschule der Bildenden Künste in Braunschweig.

== The European Graduate School (EGS) ==
Since 2002 Amelunxen has been a faculty member of the European Graduate School, a private graduate school based in Saas-Fee, Switzerland, and Valletta, Malta, which specializes in philosophy, critical thinking and art therapy.

In 2006 he obtained the Walter Benjamin Chair at the EGS, specialized in Media Philosophy and Cultural Studies.

From October 2013 to July 2018, Amelunxen served as president and provost at the European Graduate School. Under his term, the EGS has expanded to Malta and its programs have gained full European accreditation.

== Archivio Conz ==
Hubertus von Amelunxen has been the Academic Director of Archivio Conz in Berlin, Germany since 2020. The Archivio Conz brings together Lettrism, Concrete Poetry, and Fluxus in a collection of over 4,000 works including artwork, literature, documents, personal belongings and editions catalysed by the Italian publisher, collector, and also photographer Francesco Conz.

== Curatorial work ==
Besides his academic endeavours, Amelunxen has been active as curator and member of artistic organisations. From 2001 until 2007 Amelunxen was a visiting curator at the Canadian Centre for Architecture (CCA) in Montréal. During this time, he was responsible for the Tangent series of exhibitions and accompanying publications, which brought "contemporary artists into dialogue with the CCA Collection and [resulted] in newly commissioned works." While at the CCA, he played a role in the acquisition of an important group of works by Gordon Matta-Clark.

In 2003 Amelunxen was appointed member of the Fine Arts Section of the Akademie der Künste in Berlin. In 2014 he was appointed member of the first Artistic Advisory Board at the Public Art Experience, in Luxembourg.

Amelunxen has curated several international exhibitions, working shoulder to shoulder with well-known artists such as Cy Twombly, Iannis Xenakis, Dieter Appelt, Peter Weibel, Naoya Hatakeyama, among others. His exhibitions have been shown in different galleries and museums of North America and Europe.

== Editorial work ==
Amelunxen has been active as an editor. He first became member of the editorial board of the Mannheim series of papers Mana-Analytika (Média Medusa) in 1987, a position he occupied until 1992.

In 1988 he became editor of the well-known German magazine on the history of photography Fotogeschichte, which is published in Marburg and Frankfurt am Main.

Since 1996, he is a member of the German editorial board of the French series of papers Esthétique, Editions l’Harmattan, a publication based in Paris.

== Books ==
- Gustave Le Gray, Seascapes, Schirmer/Mosel, Munich (2015); contains an essay by Hubertus von Amelunxen.
- Steve Sabella, Works 1997-2014, Hatje Cantz, Ostfildern (2014); edited by Hubertus von Amelunxen.
- Gordon Matta-Clark, Moment to Moment: Space, Verlag für Moderne Kunst, Nürnberg; co-edited with Angela Lammert and Philip Ursprung (2012).
- Elger Esser, Nocturnes à Giverny. Claude Monet's Garden, Schirmer/Mosel Verlag, Munich (2012); with an essay by Hubertus von Amelunxen.
- Iannis Xenakis, Kontrolle und Zufall, Akademie der Künste, Berlin (2011); co-edited with Angela Lammert.
- Cy Twombly, Photographs III. 1951-2010 (2011); with an essay by Hubertus von Amelunxen.
- Photography and Disaster. Collected Essays, University of Disaster Series, Atropos Press, New York/Dresden (2010).
- Paul Virilio, Grey Ecology, University of Disaster Series, Atropos Press, New York/Dresden (2009); edited by Hubertus von Amelunxen.
- Notation. Kalkül und Form in den Künsten, Akademie der Künste, Berlin (2008); co-edited with Dieter Appelt and Peter Weibel.
- Naoya Hatakeyama, Scales, Nazraeli Press, Portland (2007); with an essay by Hubertus von Amelunxen.
- Petra Wittmar, Medebach, Steidl & SK Stiftung Kultur, Cologne (2007); with an essay by Hubertus von Amelunxen.
- Victor Burgin, Voyage to Italy, HatjeCantz, Stuttgart (2006); co-edited with Thomas Zander.
- Dieter Appelt, Forth Bridge. Cinema. Metric Space, Canadian Centre for Architecture, Montréal (2005).
- Alain Paiement, Tangent e, Lars Müller Publishers & Canadian Centre for Architecture, Zürich/Montréal (2003).
- Jean-Philippe Reverdot, "Bilan provisoire. Photographies 1983-1999", Marval, Paris (2001).
- Gegenwartsbildung / Present Formations, Schriftenreihe der Muthesius-Hochschule "Gestalt und Diskurs", vol. 2, Kiel (2001); co-edited with Antje Krause-Wahl.
- Photo- und Konzeptkunst am Bau. Unter den Linden 50. Ein Projekt für den Deutschen Bundestag Berlin, AWF Verlag, Heidelberg (2000); co-edited with Hans-Werner Schmidt.
- Architecture of Zaha Hadid in Photographs by Hélène Binet, Lars Müller Publishers, Baden (2000); with an essay by Hubertus von Amelunxen.
- Theorie der Fotografie i-IV. 1980-1995, Schirmer/Mosel, Munich (2000); co-edited with Wolfgang Kemp.
- Tomorrow For Ever. Architektur/Zeit/Photographie, DuMont, Cologne (1999); co-edited with Carl Aigner and Walter Smerling.
- Andreas Müller-Pohle, Interfaces. Foto + Video. 1977–1999, European Photography, Göttingen (1999); edited by Hubertus von Amelunxen.
- Artfiction. Junge Kunst aus Italien, Kiel Stadtgalerie im Kulturviertel/Sophienhof Kiel, Kiel (1998); co-edited with Knut Nievers and Edoardo DiMauro.
- Photography after Photography. Memory and Representation in the Digital Age, G+B Arts, New York (1997); co-edited with Stefan Iglhaut and Florian Rötzer.
- Les lieux du non-lieu. L'état des choses dans la photographie française contemporaine, Verlag der Kunst, Dresden (1997); co-edited with Ulrich Pohlmann.
- Fotografie nach der Fotografie, Verlag der Kunst, Berlin (1995); co-edited with Stefan Iglhaut and Florian Rötzer.
- Allegorie und Photographie. Untersuchungen zur französischen Literatur des 19. Jahrhunderts, University of Mannheim (1992); doctoral dissertation.
- Zhang Hai'er, Fotografien aus China. 1986-1989, Edition Braus, Heidelberg (1990); co-edited with Barbara Kunzendorf-Hohenadl.
- Television/Revolution. Das Ultimatum des Bildes. Rumänien im Dezember 1989, Jonas, Marburg (1990); co-edited with Andrei Ujică.
- Die aufgehobene Zeit. Die Erfindung der Photographie durch William Henry Fox Talbot, Nishen, Berlin (1988).

== Exhibitions ==
- "Cy Twombly. Photographs 1951-2010" at BOZAR-PMSK (The Palace of Fine Arts), Brussels (2012); co-curated with Cy Twombly.
- "Kontrolle und Zufall. Iannis Xenakis: Komponist, Architekt, Visionär" in the Akademie der Künste, Berlin (2011); co-curated with Sharon Kanach and Angela Lammert.
- "Notation – Kalkül und Form in den Künsten" at the Zentrum für Kunst und Medientechnologie Karlsruhe, in Karlsruhe (2008, 2009); co-curated together with Dieter Appelt and Peter Weibel.
- "Notabene" at the Villa Oppenheim in Berlin (2008).
- "Eric Rondepierre. Umkehrungen" at the Villa Oppenheim in Berlin (2008).
- "Naoya Hatakeyama: Scales" (part of the Tangent series) at the Canadian Centre for Architecture (CCA) in Montréal (2007-2008); co-curated with Louise Désy.
- Overall concept for "Peter Greenaway. L’avenir dure longtemps" at the Ecole Européenne Supérieure de l’Image in Poitiers (2007).
- "Gordon Matta-Clark. Moment to Moment: Space" at the Akademie der Künste in Berlin (2013).
- "Victor Burgin. Voyage to Italy" (part of the Tangent series) at the Canadian Centre for Architecture (CCA) in Montréal (2006-2007).
- "Anthony McCall & Eric Rondepierre. Timeline" at the Galerie Thomas Zander and at the Neues Kunstforum in Cologne (2006).
- "Dieter Appelt. Cinema Forth Bridge" (part of the Tangent series) at the Canadian Centre for Architecture (CCA) in Montréal (2005).
- "out of the box: price rossi stirling + matta-clark" at the Canadian Centre for Architecture (CCA) in Montréal (2003-2004); co-curated with Mirko Zardini, Mark Wigley, Marco De Michelis, Philip Ursprung and Anthony Vidler.
- "Tangent - Alain Paiement" (part of the Tangent series) at the Canadian Centre for Architecture (CCA) in Montréal (2003).
- "Tomorrow For Ever. Fotografie als Ruine" at the Kunsthalle in Krems and at the Lehmbruck Museum in Duisburg (1999).
- "Andreas Müller-Pohle. Interfaces, Foto und Video 1977–1999" at the Altes Rathaus in Göttingen (1999).
- "Artfiction. Junge Kunst aus Italien" at the Stadtgalerie im Sophienhof in Kiel (1998); the first of a long series of exhibitions on Italian art in Kiel.
- "Carol Dallaire. Ça a été: Le territoire en deuil" at the Rencontres Internationales de la Photographie d'Arles, in Arles (1998).
- "Les lieux du non-lieu. L'etat des choses dans la photographie française contemporaine" at the Münchener Stadtmuseum in Munich (1997).
- "Lewis Baltz & Slavica Perkovic. Stories of Power and Desire" at the Galerie Angelo Falzone in Mannheim (1996).
- "Photography after Photography", exhibition presented in Munich, Krems, Erlangen, Cottbus, Odense, Winterthur, Helsinki and Philadelphia (1995-1998); commissioned by the Siemens Kulturprogramm.
- "Der Ton des Raums. Malerei, Skulptur und Photographie" at the Galerie Angelo Falzone in Mannheim (1995).
- "Die aufgehobene Zeit. Die Erfindung der Photographie durch William Henry Fox Talbot", presented at the Städtische Galerie im Lenbachhaus in Munich and at the Palais de Tokyo in Paris (1989-1990).
- "Denis Roche. Un peu plus de lumière" at the mumok in Vienna, the Institut Français of Heidelberg and at the Frankfurter Kunstverein in Frankfurt (1986-1987).

== Academic initiatives ==
- Cinéma, Interactivité, Société / Cinema, Interactivity, Society. First Biennale Figures of Interactivity, Poitiers, France (2008).
- Workshop Vitra Design Museum, Domaine de Boisbuchet; together with Richard McGuire (2008).
- Co-responsible for the international congress config.art for Documenta 10, Kassel (1997).

== Personal life ==
Hubertus von Amelunxen married Christine Marx in 1990; they divorced in 2012. They have two sons.

Amelunxen lives and works between Berlin, Switzerland and Malta.
