= Volume Magazine =

Dutch quarterly architecture magazine

VOLUME is a biannual international magazine on architecture and design, published by Archis (a non-profit platform for architecture and beyond) in collaboration with the Nieuwe Instituut. Conceived as a global platform for architectural ideas, VOLUME gives voice to architecture in any form, anywhere, and at any time. It takes an agenda-setting approach to architectural discourse, engaging critically with global perspectives on design, social structures, and the built environment.

Based in Amsterdam, the editorial team works with contributors, including Beatriz Colomina, Markus Miessen, Ole Bouman, Saskia Sassen, Paul Preciado, Liam Young, Mark Wigley, Maria Otero, and Benjamin Bratton.

Founded by Ole Bouman, Rem Koolhaas, and Mark Wigley in 2005, VOLUME is set out to be not only a magazine, but also a studio and a school. Stephan Petermann is the current editor-in-chief of Volume, while Lilet Breddels is its director.

== History ==
VOLUME was founded in 2004 as a continuation of Archis, a magazine with a lineage dating back to 1929. Previous incarnations include Het Katholiek Bouwblad (1929-1960), TABK - Tijdschrift voor Architectuur en Beeldende Kunsten (1960–1973), Wonen (1973–1986), and Archis (1986–2004). In its transformation into VOLUME, the magazine became a collaborative project involving Archis (Amsterdam), AMO (the think tank of OMA, Rotterdam), and C-Lab (a think tank at Columbia University’s GSAPP, New York).

Since 2023, VOLUME Magazine has been a collaboration between Archis and the Nieuwe Instituut. This partnership integrates the magazine’s editorial independence with the research and programming activities of Nieuwe Instituut, fostering a dynamic exchange between writing and exhibiting, collecting and debate, institutional knowledge and journalism.

== Editorial approach ==
VOLUME moves beyond the traditional scope of architectural practice to examine the intersections between space, culture, and politics. The magazine actively engages with contemporary global issues, embracing speculative design and interdisciplinary collaborations. Each issue of VOLUME focuses on a critical theme in architecture, design, and urbanism.
