= Mark Wigley =

New Zealand-born American architect and author

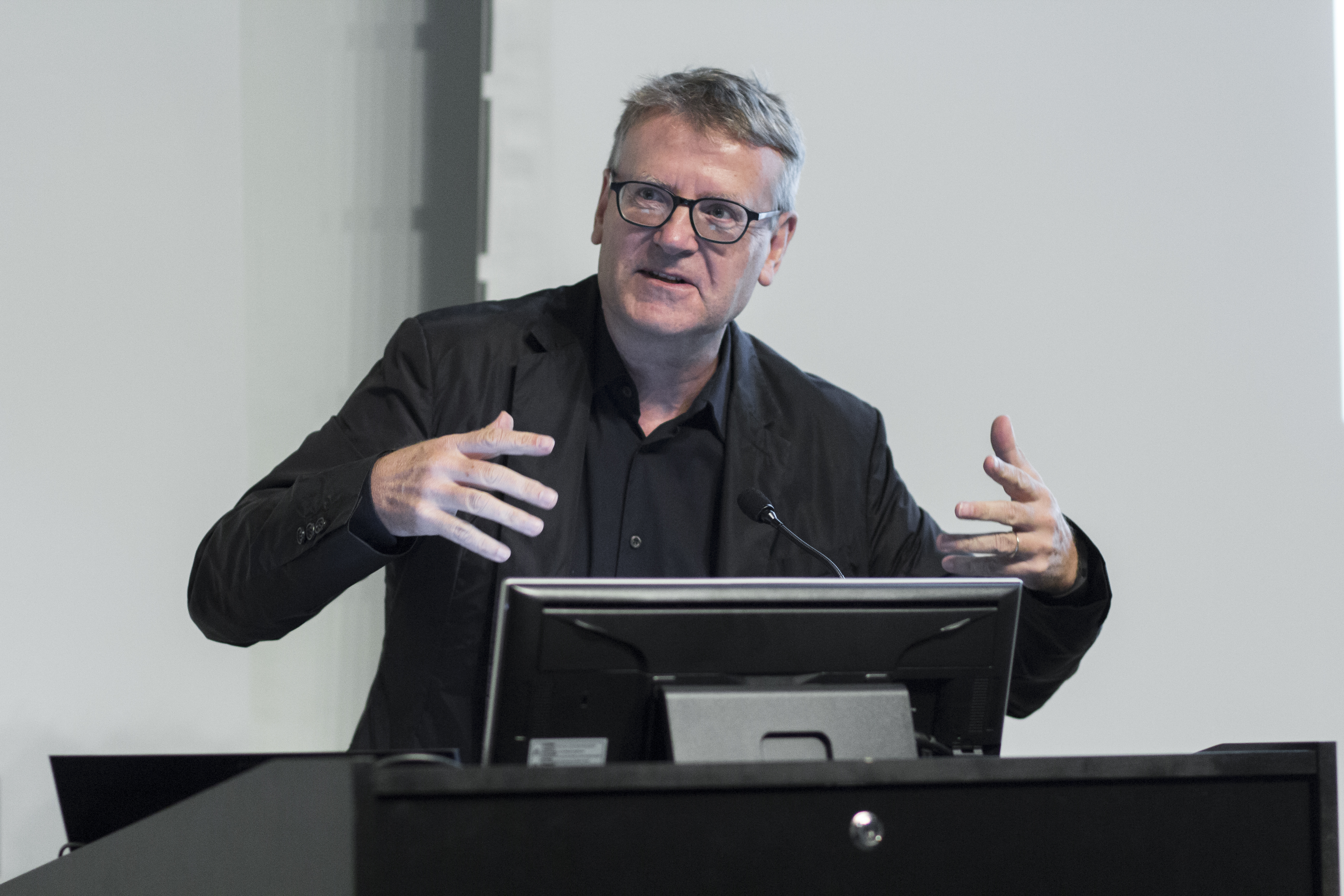
- Mark Wigley at GSAPP (2015)
- Born: Mark Antony Wigley; 1956 (age 69–70); Palmerston North, New Zealand
- Known for: Art history, architectural history, architectural theory

Mark Antony Wigley (born 1956) is a New Zealand-born architectural historian and critic based in the United States. He is a Professor of Architecture at the Columbia Graduate School of Architecture, Planning and Preservation. From 2004 to 2014, he was the Dean of Columbia University's Graduate School of Architecture, Planning and Preservation.

== Career ==
Wigley received both his Bachelor of Architecture (1979) and Ph.D. (1987) from the University of Auckland, New Zealand. Mike Austin was his doctoral supervisor. Wigley left Auckland in 1986 and taught at Princeton University, from 1987 to 1999, serving also as the director of Graduate Studies at Princeton’s School of Architecture.

In 1988, Wigley co-curated with Philip Johnson the MoMA exhibition Deconstructivist Architecture. The exhibition featured the works of seven architects, who were already well-known at the time for a style of architecture that involved in various ways "deconstructing" conventional notions of architectural convention: Frank Gehry, Zaha Hadid, Peter Eisenman, Daniel Libeskind, Bernard Tschumi, Rem Koolhaas and Coop Himmelb(l)au. The curators linked the works to the philosophical notion of Deconstruction, as espoused by French philosopher Jacques Derrida, as well as the art-architectural historical precedent of Russian constructivism, and several works from this period were displayed in the exhibition. However, of the architects involved only Eisenman and Tschumi acknowledged the connection to Derrida.

== Volume ==
In 2005, Wigley founded Volume Magazine together with Rem Koolhaas and Ole Bouman. A collaborative project by Archis (Amsterdam), AMO Rotterdam and C-lab (Columbia University NY), Volume Magazine is an experimental think tank focusing on the process of spatial and cultural reflexivity. The magazine aims to explore "beyond architecture’s definition of 'making buildings'" by presenting global views on architecture and design, broader attitudes to social structures and created environments, and embodies progressive journalism.

Created and founded in collaboration with Brett Steele, the Institute of Failure; essentially an academic institution for the instruction and theory of failure (as opposed to success).

== Awards ==
Wigley was awarded the Resident Fellowship, Chicago Institute for Architecture and Urbanism, 1989; International Committee of Architectural Critics (C.I.C.A.) Triennial Award for Architectural Criticism, 1990; and the Graham Foundation Grant, 1997.

== Personal life ==
Mark Wigley is married to architectural historian Beatriz Colomina.

== Exhibitions ==
- Deconstructivist Architecture, Museum of Modern Art, New York, 23 June to 30 August 1988 (with Philip Johnson)
- Constant — New Babylon, Witte de With Center for Contemporary Art, Rotterdam, 21 November 1997 to 10 January 1998
- The American Lawn: Surface of Everyday Life, Canadian Centre for Architecture, Montreal, 16 June 1998 to 8 November 1998 (with Beatriz Colomina, Elizabeth Diller, Alessandra Ponte, Ricardo Scofidio, Georges Teyssot, and Mark Wasiuta)
- Another City for Another Life: Constant’s New Babylon, The Drawing Center, New York, 2 November 1999 to 30 December 1999
- Laboratories: Six Young Architectural Firms in the CCA Galleries, Canadian Centre for Architecture, Montreal, 18 April 2002 to 15 September 2002 (with Frédéric Migayrou)
- out of the box: price rossi stirling + matta-clark, Canadian Centre for Architecture, Montreal, 23 October 2003 to 6 September 2004 (with Marco de Michelis, Philip Ursprung, Anthony Vidler, Hubertus von Amelunxen, and Mirko Zardini)

== Bibliography ==
- (With Philip Johnson) Deconstructivist Architecture. New York: The Museum of Modern Art; Boston: Little Brown and Company; Distributed by New York Graphic Society Books, 1988. ISBN 087070298X
- The Architecture of Deconstruction: Derrida's Haunt. Cambridge, Massachusetts: MIT Press, 1993. ISBN 0262731142
- White Walls, Designer Dresses: The Fashioning of Modern Architecture. Cambridge, Massachusetts: MIT Press, 1995. ISBN 0262731452
- Constant's New Babylon: The Hyper-Architecture of Desire. Rotterdam: Witte de With, Center for Contemporary Art, 1998. ISBN 9064503435
- (Edited with Catherine De Zegher) The Activist Drawing: Retracing Situationist Architectures from Constant's New Babylon to Beyond. New York: The Drawing Center, 2001. ISBN 026204191X
- (With James Graham). Cutting Matta-Clark. The Anarchitecture Project. Zürich: Lars Müller Publishers; New York: Columbia University GSAPP, 2014. ISBN 9783037784273
- Buckminster Fuller Inc.: Architecture in the Age of Radio. Zürich: Lars Müller Publishers, 2015. ISBN 3037784288
- (With Beatriz Colomina). Are We Human? : Notes on an Archaeology of Design. Zürich: Lars Müller Publishers, 2016. ISBN 303778511X
- Cutting Matta-Clark. The Anarchitecture Investigation. Zürich: Lars Müller Publishers; Montreal: Canadian Centre for Architecture; New York: Columbia University GSAPP, 2018. ISBN 9783037784273
- Konrad Wachsmann's Television: Post-architectural Transmissions (Critical Spatial Practice, Band 11), London: Sternberg Press 2020
