= Norman Brosterman =

American author, art dealer, and collector

Norman Brosterman (born 1952) is an American author, art dealer, and collector. He is an authority on the history of children's construction toys and building blocks, and antique pattern-making and mosaic toys. He has written Inventing Kindergarten (1997) on the history of the original kindergarten system and its influence on the development of abstract art and modern architecture in the 20th century. In 1989, his collection of antique construction toys was acquired by the Canadian Centre for Architecture in Montreal.

== Selected exhibitions ==
- Potential Architecture: Construction Toys from the CCA Collection, Canadian Centre for Architecture, 4 December 1991 to 8 March 1992
- Inventing Kindergarten, Alyce de Roulet Williamson Gallery at ArtCenter College of Design, 14 October 2006 to 7 January 2007

== Selected publications ==
- Potential Architecture: Construction Toys from the CCA Collection. / Architecture potentielle: jeux de construction de la collection du CCA. Montreal: Canadian Centre for Architecture, 1991. ISBN 978-0920785133
- Drawing the Future: Design Drawings for the 1939 New York World's Fair. New York: Museum of the City of New York, 1996. (contributor) ISBN 9780910961073
- "Child's Play", Art in America, Vol. 85, No. 4 (1997).
- Inventing Kindergarten. New York: Abrams, 1997. ISBN 978-0810935266
- Out of Time: Designs for the Twentieth-Century Future. New York: Abrams, 2000. ISBN 0810929392
