= Borasi =

Borasi is a surname of Italian origin. Notable people with this surname include:

- Benjamín Borasi (born 1997), Argentine professional footballer
- Giovanna Borasi (born 1971), Italian architect and Director of the Canadian Centre for Architecture (CCA) in Montreal

== See also ==
- Borås (disambiguation)
