= Paiement =

Paiement is a surname. Notable people with the surname include:

- Alain Paiement (born 1960), Canadian artist
- André Paiement (1950–1978), Canadian playwright and musician
- Jonathan Paiement (born 1985), Canadian ice hockey player
- Lucien Paiement (c. 1932 – 2013), Canadian physician and politician
- Mahée Paiement (born 1976), Canadian actress
- Pierre Paiement (born 1950), Canadian ice hockey player
- Rachel Paiement (born 1955), Canadian musician and songwriter
- Réal Paiement (born 1959), Canadian ice hockey player
- Rosaire Paiement (born 1945), Canadian ice hockey player
- Wilf Paiement (born 1955), Canadian ice hockey player
