= Mirko Zardini =

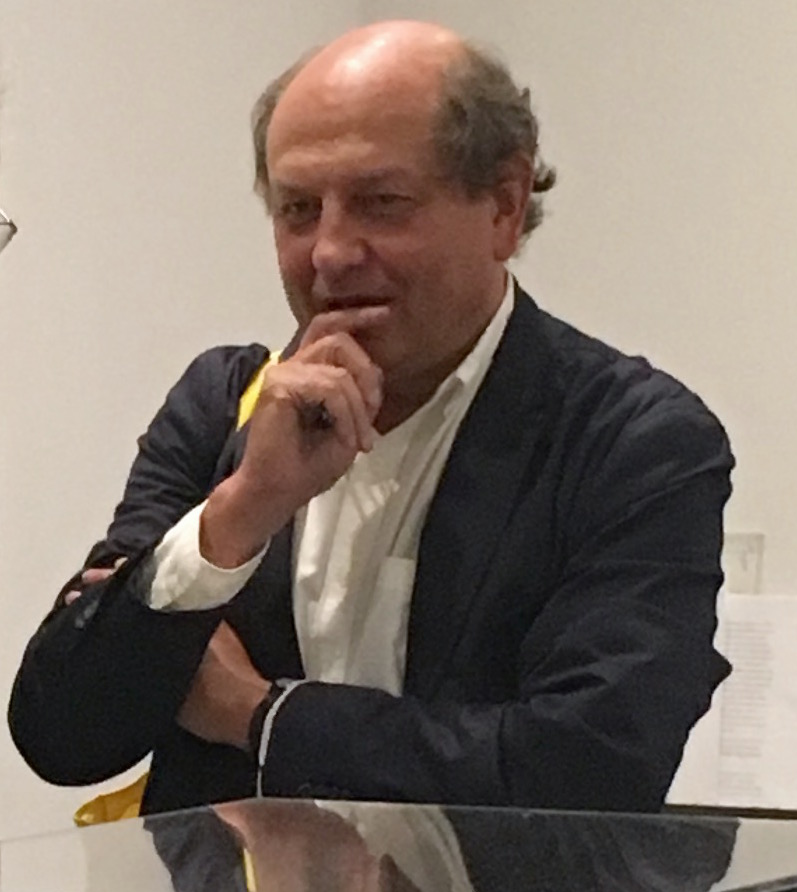
- Born: 1955 (age 70–71)
- Occupations: Curator, editor, architect

Mirko Zardini (Verona, born in 1955) is the former Director and a member of the Board of Trustees of the Canadian Centre for Architecture (CCA) in Montreal, Quebec, Canada. He is an architect who teaches, curates exhibitions, and writes about contemporary architecture and urban issues. Zardini is an active member and former trustee of the Association of Art Museum Directors (AAMD), is on the Executive Committee of the International Confederation of Architectural Museums (ICAM), and is a member of the Canadian Art Museum Directors Organization (CAMDO).

== Canadian Centre for Architecture ==
Zardini was senior consulting curator of the Canadian Centre for Architecture (CCA) from 2003-2005 and was appointed director and chief curator in 2005. He has shaped the institution's collection, research, exhibitions, programs and publications to emphasize the CCA's role as a venue for critical discourse about contemporary culture and the relationship of architecture to politics and society. His thematic approach often juxtaposes contradictory ideas to highlight the complexity of social and urban issues.

The CCA's collection of international architectural archives has received significant additions during Zardini's tenure, most notably those of Pritzker-prize-winner Álvaro Siza Vieira, Abalos & Herreros and Foreign Office Architects. A research project on the early application of digital tools in architectural design developed in collaboration with architect Greg Lynn resulted in the exhibition series "Archaeology of the Digital" and also led to the acquisition of digital project archives by the featured architects including Chuck Hoberman, Shoei Yoh, and others.

The exhibition program developed under Zardini has been recognized internationally. Design Observer named "Imperfect Health: The Medicalization of Architecture" the best exhibition of 2012 and published a review stating "it is worth noting that this show is just the latest in a series of inventive exhibitions that engage in social themes (energy consumption, proactive urbanism, war) undertaken by the CCA under Zardini, shows that together reassert that institution's place as a center of architectural culture." About the exhibition "Architecture in Uniform: Designing and Building for the Second World War", curated by Jean-Louis Cohen, The New York Times architecture critic Nicolai Ouroussoff wrote "Simply put, it's one of the most important architecture exhibitions I've seen in years." The Globe and Mail described Zardini's exhibitions as "suggestive, poetic", and "fascinating", noting their role in critically examining architecture's relationship to the environment.

Zardini is an advocate for online access and the need to strengthen long-distance research tools and collaborative digital projects for a global audience. In his 2012 text "A Project for Two Buildings", Zardini outlines his vision for an institution with "two buildings: the physical one, anchored to a specific place, and the digital, accessed online from any place at any time." Zardini oversaw the redevelopment of the CCA's website as a publishing platform dedicated to shaping architectural discourse, which allows the institution "to frame contemporary problems in a different way, to have a critical attitude about how architects work, and to show the inherent contradictions." The website was designed by Studio Lin, New York, and developed by Brazen, Montreal. Zardini launched the CCA's digital book publishing initiative with an electronic version of the exhibition catalogue for "Imperfect Health: The Medicalization of Architecture" and then created a digital-only epub series featuring individual projects from the "Archaeology of the Digital" exhibitions. The series was designed and developed by the New York-based graphic design studio Linked by Air and features technical innovations such as interactive slideshows and responsive design within the standard formats of reflowable e-books.

== Exhibitions ==
Exhibitions organized and co-organized by Mirko Zardini at the Canadian Centre for Architecture (CCA)

- It's All Happening So Fast, A Counter-History of the Modern Canadian Environment (2016)
- Rooms You May Have Missed: Bijoy Jain and Umberto Riva (2014)
- Imperfect Health: The Medicalization of Architecture (2011-2012, co-organized with Giovanna Borasi)
- Other Space Odysseys: Greg Lynn, Michael Maltzan, Alessandro Poli (2010, co-organized with Giovanna Borasi)
- Actions: What You Can Do With the City (2008-2009, co-organized with Giovanna Borasi)
- 1973: Sorry, Out of Gas (2007-2008, co-organized with Giovanna Borasi)
- Sense of the City (2005-2006)
- out of the box: price rossi stirling + matta-clark (2003-04 with collaborating curators Hubertus von Amelunxen, Marco De Michelis, Philip Ursprung, Anthony Vidler, and Mark Wigley)

Other exhibitions organized and co-organized by Zardini

- A stroll through a fun palace, Swiss Pavilion at the 14th Venice Biennale of Architecture, Venice, Italy, 2014, with Hans-Ulrich Obrist
- Asfalto: Il carattere della città, Triennale di Milano, Milan, Italy, 2003, with Giovanna Borasi.
- Parking Plus Picturesque, École polytechnique fédérale de Lausanne, Switzerland, 2000.

== Editorial work ==
Zardini was editor of Lotus International magazine from 1988 to 1999, and editor of Casabella magazine and Quaderni di Casabella from 1983 to 1988. He has also guest edited an issue of El Croquis magazine (number 105 dedicated to Bolles+Wilson architects in 2011), the February 1999 issue of Archi Magazine, and served on the editorial board of Domus Magazine from 2004 to 2005.

Zardini also contributes articles to other publications including Places Journal and Volume magazine.

== Select bibliography ==
- Bratishenko, Lev and Mirko Zardini, Editors. "It's All Happening So Fast". Montreal: Canadian Centre for Architecture, and Heijningen, The Netherlands: Jap Sam Books, 2016. ISBN 9789490322786
- Zardini, Mirko. Rooms You May Have Missed. Baden: Lars Müller Publishers, 2014. ISBN 9783037784587
- Obrist, Hans-Ulrich (Ed.). Lucius Burckhardt & Cedric Price: A Stroll Through a Fun Palace: Swiss Pavilion, Biennale Architettura 2014 with essay by Mirko Zardini "In a Corner of a Room, a Cedric Price". Zürich: Swiss Arts Council Pro Helvetia, 2014.
- Lynn, Greg and Mirko Zardini. Archaeology of the Digital: Peter Eisenman, Frank Gehry, Chuck Hoberman, Shoei Yoh. Montreal: Canadian Centre for Architecture, 2013. ISBN 9781927071021
- Stein, Ria (Ed.), Mirko Zardini et al. Kuwabara Payne McKenna Blumberg Architects. Basel: Birkhäuser, 2013. ISBN 9783034608282
- Borasi, Giovanna and Daria Der Kaloustian, Editors. CCA on Paper with conversation between Phyllis Lambert and Mirko Zardini. Montreal: Canadian Centre for Architecture, 2013. ISBN 9781927071045
- Borasi, Giovanna and Mirko Zardini, Editors. Imperfect Health: The Medicalization of Architecture. Montreal: Canadian Centre for Architecture, 2012. ISBN 9781927071014
- Borasi, Giovanna (Ed.), Mirko Zardini, et al. Journeys: How travelling fruit, ideas and buildings rearrange our environment. Montreal: Canadian Centre for Architecture, 2011. ISBN 9780920785904
- Allen, Stan and Marc McQuade, Editors. Mirko Zardini et al. Landform Building: Architecture's New Terrain. Princeton: Princeton University School of Architecture, 2011. ISBN 9783037782231
- Borasi, Giovanna and Mirko Zardini, Editors. Other Space Odysseys: Greg Lynn, Michael Maltzan, Alessandro Poli. Montreal: Canadian Centre for Architecture, 2010. ISBN 9780920785881
- Borasi, Giovanna and Mirko Zardini, Editors. Actions: What You Can Do With the City. Montreal: Canadian Centre for Architecture, 2009. ISBN 9780920785829
- Jacobs, Steven and Frank Maes, Editors. Beyond the Picturesque with essay by Mirko Zardini "Green is the Color". Gent: Stedelijk Museum van Actuele Kunst, 2009.
- Borasi, Giovanna (Ed.), Mirko Zardini, et al. Some Ideas on Living in London and Tokyo: Stephen Taylor, Ryue Nishizawa. Montreal: Canadian Centre for Architecture, 2008. ISBN 9780920785805
- Borasi, Giovanna and Mirko Zardini, Editors. Sorry, Out of Gas: Architecture's Response to the 1973 Oil Crisis. Montreal: Canadian Centre for Architecture, 2008. ISBN 9780920785782
- Zardini, Mirko (Ed.). Sense of the City: An Alternate Approach to Urbanism. Montreal: Canadian Centre for Architecture, 2006. ISBN 0920785735
- Ryan, Raymund, Ai Weiwei and Mirko Zardini. "Michael Maltzan: Alternate Ground". Pittsburg: Carnegie Museum of Art, 2005. ISBN
- Coupland, Douglas. Super City with text by Mirko Zardini. Montreal: Canadian Centre for Architecture, 2005. ISBN 9780880390453
- Lerup, Lars and Mirko Zardini. "Bolles + Wilson: Nieuwe Luxor Theater, Rotterdam". Fellbach: Edition Axel Menges, 2003.
- Zardini, Mirko. (A) asfalto: il carattere della città (Asphalt: The Character of the City). Milan: Mondadori Electra, 2003. ISBN 8837021216
- Campi, Mario, Franz Bucher, Mirko Zardini. Annähernd perfecte Peripherie: Glattalstadt/Greater Zurich Area. Basel: Birkhäuser, 2001. ISBN 3764363118
- Zardini, Mirko. Paesaggi ibridi: Highway, Multiplicity. Milan: Skira, 1999. ISBN 8881186640
