= University of Lübeck =

Public university in Germany

- Universität zu Lübeck
- Seal of the University of Lübeck
- Motto: Im Focus das Leben
- Motto in English: Focus on Life
- Type: Public
- Established: 1964
- Budget: € 171.21 million
- President: Gabriele Gillessen-Kaesbach
- Academic staff: 3,129
- Administrative staff: 352
- Students: 5,142 WS 2022/23
- Location: Lübeck, Schleswig-Holstein, Germany; 53°50′13″N 10°42′21″E
- Colors: Ocean green and White
- Website: www.uni-luebeck.de

The University of Lübeck is a research university in Lübeck, Northern Germany which focuses almost entirely on medicine and sciences with applications in medicine.

== General ==
The university has a Faculty of Medicine and a Faculty of Technology and Natural Sciences. It offers professional degrees and doctoral degrees (in particular, but not only, Dr.med.) in medicine and Bachelor, Master and doctoral degrees in science and engineering disciplines with applications to medicine. Additionally, since 2013 the university extended its portfolio by establishing a department of psychology and has been offering Bachelor and master's degrees in psychology since then. Further, in winter semester 2007/2008, the PhD programme "Computing in Medicine and Life Sciences" was introduced with the establishment of the Graduate School for Computing in Medicine and Life Sciences at the university.

Currently, the university has around 4,945 students, 160 Professors and 100 lecturers. In 2003 the affiliated teaching hospital of the University of Lübeck was merged with that of Kiel University into the university teaching hospital of Schleswig-Holstein, thus making the 2nd largest one in Germany. With a total number of staff over 5,300, the University of Lübeck and its teaching hospital belong to the largest employer in the region of Lübeck.

In 2016, a new, publicly funded interdisciplinary research center, the "Center for Brain, Behavior and Metabolism" (CBBM), was opened on campus. It hosts lab space and offices for 33 research groups working on the intersection of biomedicine and neuroscience.

== Rankings ==
University rankings

Overall – Global & National
| ARWU World 2023 | 601–700 | 37–40 |

The Academic Ranking of World Universities (ARWU) for 2023 places the university within the 601–700 bracket globally, and between 37th and 40th in the national context. Its best ranked subjects are Biological Sciences (151–200), Human Biological Sciences (201–300), Medical Technology (201–300) and Clinical Medicine (301–400).

== See also ==
- International School of New Media
