= Hélène Binet =

Swiss-French architectural photographer

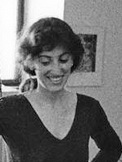
- Hélène Binet in Prague, 1991
- Born: 1959 (age 66–67); Sorengo, Switzerland
- Occupation: architectural photographer
- Website: www.helenebinet.com

Hélène Binet born 1959 is a Swiss-French architectural photographer based in London, who is also one of the leading architectural photographers in the world. She is most known for her work with architects Daniel Libeskind, Peter Zumthor and Zaha Hadid, and has published books on works of several architects.

Binet was awarded an Honorary Fellowship of the Royal Institute of British Architects in 2008 and the Julius Shulman Institute Excellence in Photography Award in 2015. Her work is held in the collections of the Museum of Modern Art in New York and the Carnegie Museum of Art in Pittsburgh, Pennsylvania.

== Biography ==
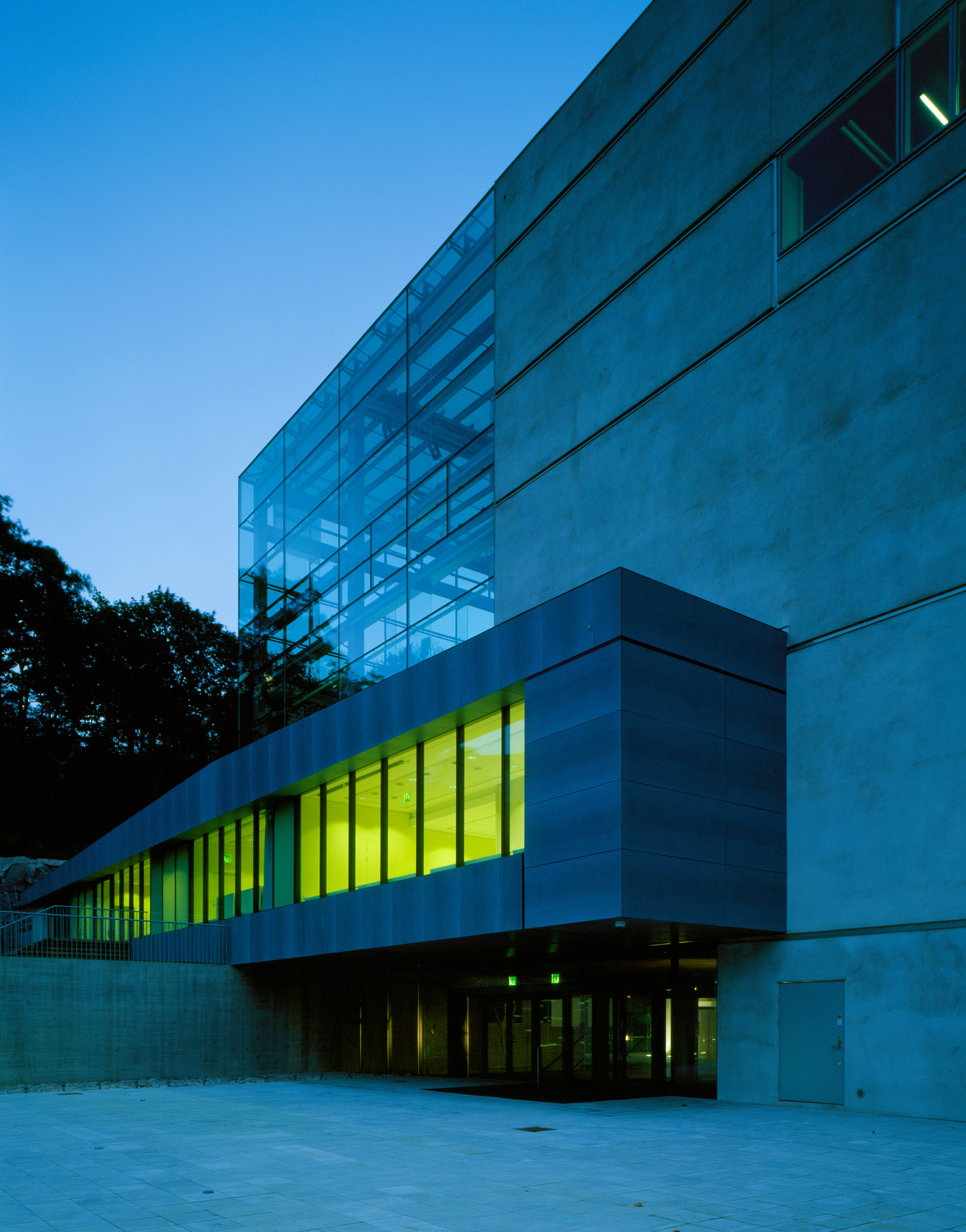
Museum of World Culture, Gothenburg, Sweden (Hélène Binet photograph)

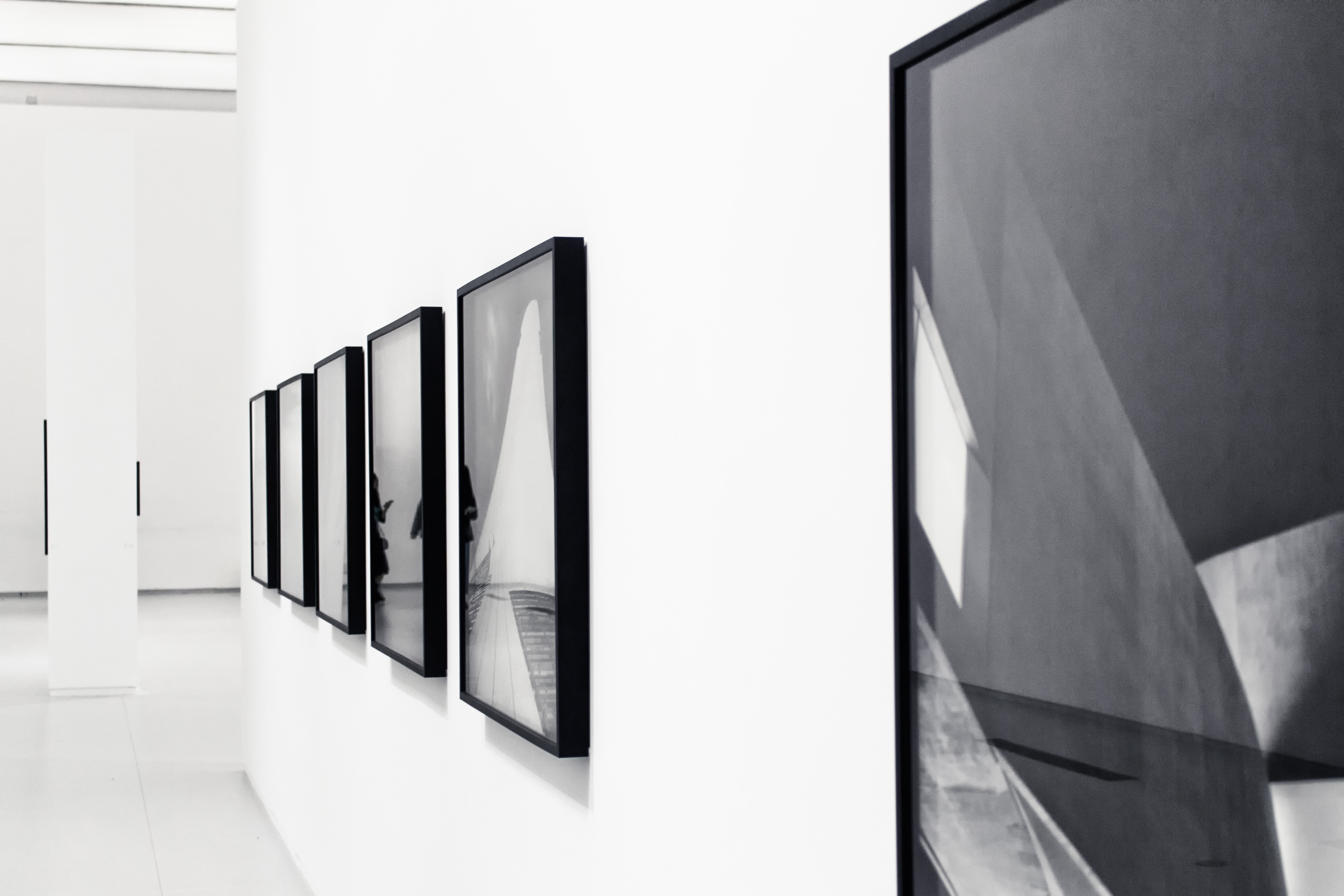
Binet exhibition at the Power Station of Art, Shanghai, China

Binet was born in 1959 in Sorengo, Switzerland to Swiss and French parents. She studied photography at the Istituto Europeo di Design in Rome, where she grew up. She worked as a photographer at the Grand Théâtre de Genève, an opera house in Geneva, Switzerland, where she photographed various performances for two years, before turning to architectural photography, encouraged by architect, Daniel Libeskind, who believed, "she exposes architecture’s achievements, strength, pathos and fragility."

Binet works exclusively with photographic film.

She has worked with Raoul Bunschoten, Caruso St John, David Chipperfield, Tony Fretton, Zaha Hadid, Zvi Hecker, John Hejduk, Coop Himmelb(l)au, Daniel Libeskind, the architect Peter Cook, Sauerbruch Hutton, Peter Zumthor, and Josef Paul Kleihues among others, besides publishing books on buildings by Le Corbusier, Alvar Aalto, Sigurd Lewerentz, and Dimitris Pikionis.

== Personal life ==
Binet had a house on Osea Island in the River Blackwater Estuary in Essex. She is married to Raoul Bunschoten, and the couple live in London with their two children, Izaak and Saskia Ada.

== Publications ==
- The Inns of Court with Jill Allibone, David Evans. Black Dog Publishing Limited, 1996. ISBN 0952177315.
- Helene Binet: Seven Projects, with Zaha Hadid, Daniel Libeskind, Mark Rappolt, Shine Gallery. Guiding Light, 2002. ISBN 0953845133.
- Photographs. Phaidon Inc. Ltd, 2009. ISBN 0714849421.
- Helene Binet: Composing Space: The Photographs of Helene Binet. Phaidon Press, 2012. ISBN 0714861197.

For architects

- A passage through silence and light, Daniel Libeskind, Raoul Bunschoten. Black Dog, 1997. ISBN 0952177358.
- The House of the Book, Peter Cook, Zvi Hecker, John Hejduk. Black Dog, 1999,
- Architecture of Zaha Hadid in photographs (with Hubertus von Amelunxen), Lars Müller, 2000.
- Holocaust Mahnmal Berlin: Eisenman Architects, Hanno Rauterberg, Lukas Wassmann. Müller, 2005. ISBN 3037780592.

== Awards ==
- 1997: Redaksjonell Fotografi from Visuelt
- 2004: Wissenschaft fur Leben Scholarship, from the Olympus Europa Stiftung
- 2006: Forum AID Award
- 2008: Honorary Fellowship of Royal Institute of British Architects
- 2015: Julius Shulman Institute Excellence in Photography Award

== Collections ==
Binet's work is held in the following permanent collections:

- Museum of Modern Art, New York
- Carnegie Museum of Art, Pittsburgh, Pennsylvania
