= International School of New Media =

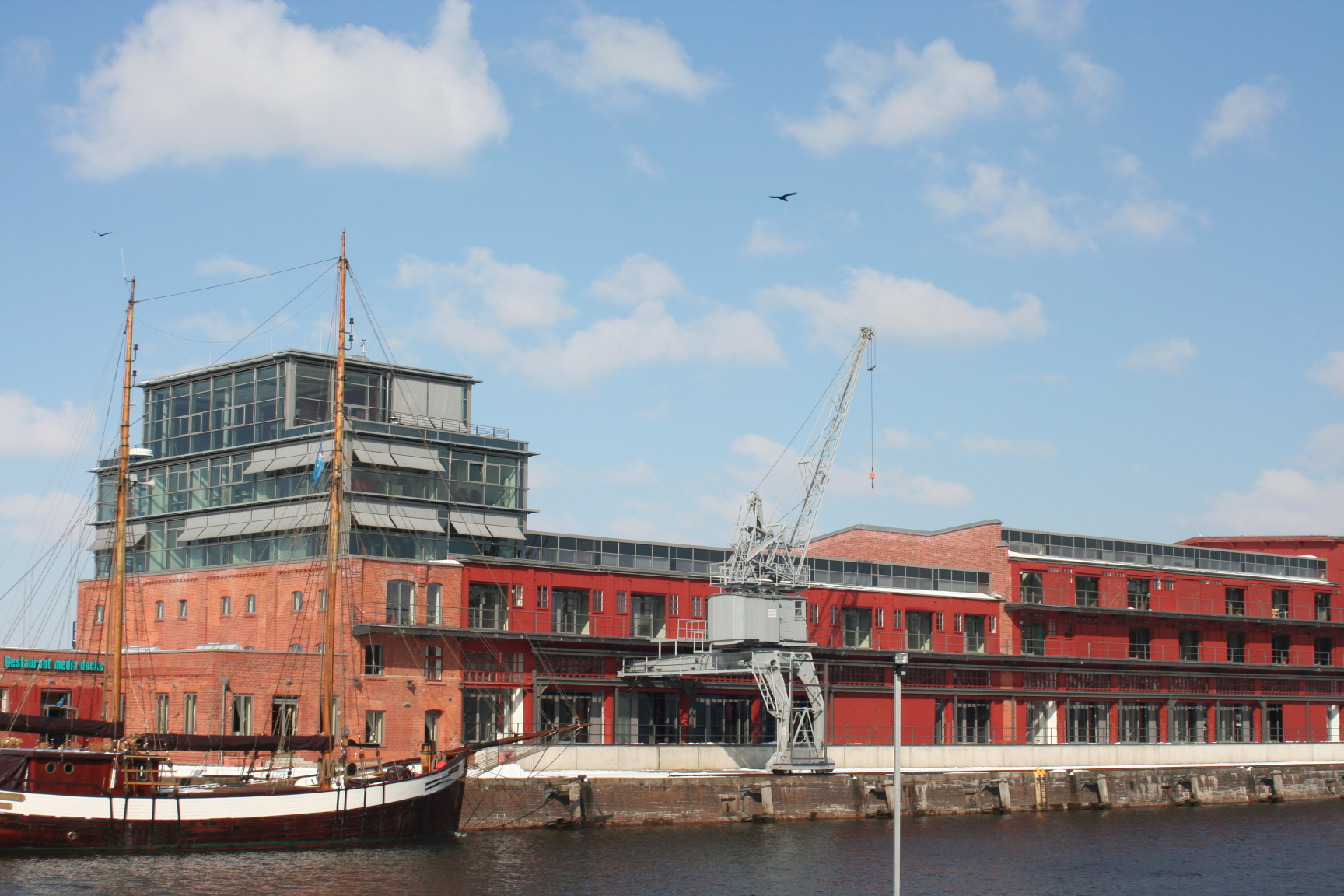
- Lübeck; Germany

Information
- Established: 2001
- Closed: 2011
- Affiliation: University of Lübeck

International School of New Media (short ISNM) in Lübeck, Germany was an international, affiliated private institute at the University of Lübeck. It was closed end of 2011.

ISNM was established in 2001 by the founding directors Hubertus von Amelunxen and Michael Herczeg for the purpose of providing study programmes that combine the technological, scientific, social, economical, and cultural aspects and implications of New Media.

At the ISNM, students work and study with peers with diverse cultural and educational backgrounds. For instance, architects, computer scientists, artists, and sociologists can work together on a project as a team.

Until 2008, ISNM offered a graduate program conducted entirely in English leading to an award of a M.Sc. in Digital Media degree. The 24-month-long program received international accreditation by ZeVA Hannover. The M.Sc. in Digital Media program provided academic training in interdisciplinary media competence. It connected Media Technology, Computer Science, design and e-commerce with the New Media in the arts, culture and society. The M.Sc. degree qualified students for positions at the intersections of digital media in business, industry, research, education, tourism and international organisations, among others.

The ISNM’s interdisciplinary graduate program in Digital Media aimed at creating decision-makers and managers in every sector and discipline with a more complete understanding of digital media's role in the 21st century’s global world and market. The program followed a concerted strategy to reach this goal by providing a unique combination of technology, business, research, arts, design and culture in the Digital Media sector. Substantial emphasis was placed on the transfer of learning from the university to the work setting and an integration of students’ diverse backgrounds into interdisciplinary project management and intercultural teamwork.

ISNM founders have set the standard for the faculty whose teaching and research is consistently influencing New Media practices. The faculty is a group with honors and research awards on their credits.
