= Ann Charney =

Canadian writer and journalist

Ann Charney (born 1940) is a Canadian novelist, short story writer and journalist.

== Career ==
Her most recent novel, Life Class was published in 2013. It is a story of displacement and ambition played out in the art circles of Venice, New York and Montreal and is dedicated to her late husband, the artist Melvin Charney who died in September 2012.

Her previous novel is Distantly Related to Freud, the coming of age story of a young girl, who dreams of becoming a writer and a femme fatale.

Her most widely published novel is Dobryd, the story of a child discovering freedom amid the chaos of war's aftermath.

Her work has been published in Canada, the US, France, Germany and Italy.

== Awards and honors ==
She has won Canadian National Magazine Awards both for her fiction and non-fiction, the Canadian Authors' Association Prize for non-fiction, was a finalist for a QSPELL Award for Defiance in their Eyes, and was made an officer of the French Order of Arts and Letters.
