= Peter Rose (architect) =

Canadian architect

Peter D. Rose
- Born: Montreal, Quebec, Canada
- Education: Yale University
- Occupation: Architect
- Spouse: Eve Blau
- Practice: Peter Rose and Partners
- Buildings: Canadian Centre for Architecture

Peter D. Rose FAIA, FRAIC is an architect and educator. Rose is the founder and principal of Peter Rose and Partners, an architectural, research, and urban design practice founded in Montreal, Quebec, Canada now based in Boston, Massachusetts.

== Career ==
Rose's best known work in Canada is the Canadian Centre for Architecture, which was designed by Rose with the Centre's founder Phyllis Lambert as consulting architect and Erol Argun as associate architect. Completed in 1989, the CCA received the Honor Awards for Architecture from the American Institute of Architects and the Governor General's Medals in Architecture in 1992.

Rose founded the Alcan Lectures in Architecture, which ran from 1974 to 1992. This lecture series, sponsored by Alcan Aluminium Limited, brought architects, architectural historians and planners to the city. Rose's association with Alcan also included interior planning and design with Peter Lanken on the company's world headquarters Maison Alcan on Sherbrooke Street, which preserved a row of historic buildings in city's Golden Square Mile district.

In collaboration with Aurèle Cardinal, Rose designed the plans for the redevelopment of the Old Port of Montreal in the early 90s.

After studying architecture at Yale University, where he worked under Vincent Scully and Charles Moore, Rose returned to Montreal, designing Postmodern vacation houses in the Eastern Townships and Laurentian regions. He is noted for his residential designs for homes in western New England, including several vacation cottages in northern Vermont and individual houses in Sharon, Connecticut and Stowe, Vermont. His design for the house in Stowe was selected as one of Architectural Record's Record Houses in 1998. The New York Times featured his renovation of a townhouse for Edgar Bronfman, Jr. in Manhattan in September 1999.

In 2010, construction was completed on Rose's design for a dormitory at the Kripalu Center for Yoga and Health in Stockbridge, Massachusetts.

Rose was an adjunct professor of Architecture at the Harvard Graduate School of Design and has taught at Princeton University, McGill University and the University of Toronto. He is the author of Peter Rose: Houses, published by Princeton Architectural Press.
