= Aurèle Cardinal =

Aurèle Cardinal (French pronunciation: [oʁɛl kaʁdinal]) is a Quebec architect, urban planner and academic. In 2007, his plan for the Outremont campus of the Université de Montréal received the award of excellence for urban design from the Canadian Institute of Planners. Cardinal, who is a partner in Groupe Cardinal Hardy, conceived the plan in collaboration with Groupe Provencher & Roy architectes, another Quebec firm. He has also taught at the university's Faculté d'aménagement (Faculty of Planning [design, architecture, landscaping, urban planning]) since 1979.

In the early 1990s, Cardinal collaborated with Peter Rose on the redevelopment of the Old Port of Montreal.

Cardinal Hardy and Provencher & Roy also collaborated on the design of the Cité Multimédia district.
