= Joanna Merwood-Salisbury =

New Zealand architectural historian

- Born: 22 July 1969

Academic background
- Education: Princeton University, Victoria University of Wellington
- Theses: Towards the architecture of the future: Cesar Daly and the science of expression (1995); The mechanization of cladding: The Chicago skyscraper and the constructions of architectural modernity (2003)
- Doctoral advisor: Beatriz Colomina
- Other advisor: Alberto Pérez-Gómez

Joanna Merwood-Salisbury is a New Zealand academic, and is a full professor at the Victoria University of Wellington, specialising in urban American architectural history and the history of interior design.

== Early life and education ==
Merwood-Salisbury was born in Wellington, when her parents were both students at Victoria University of Wellington. Her grandfather was a building contractor and her father worked in the concrete industry, and Merwood-Salisbury wanted to be an architect from childhood. Merwood-Salisbury completed a Bachelor of Architecture at Victoria University of Wellington, at a time when there was less focus on building design and more on the science, performance and construction of buildings. Prompted by the 1992 recession and encouraged by the newly-arrived Canadian professor Clarence Aasen, who had more of a design focus, Merwood-Salisbury headed overseas to continue her training. She completed a master's of architecture degree at McGill University, with a thesis on French architectural theorist and critic César Daly, supervised by Alberto Pérez-Gómez. This was followed by a PhD from Princeton University under the supervision of Beatriz Colomina, focusing on Chicago skyscrapers and how they changed to public space. Merwood-Salisbury then turned her dissertation into the book Chicago 1890: The Skyscraper and the Modern City.

== Academic career ==
Although she had originally intended to become a professional architect, Merwood-Salisbury enjoyed academia, and joined the Parsons School of Design in New York in 2003 as an architectural historian. She then became interested in interior design, and its relationship to architecture. Merwood-Salisbury returned to New Zealand to join the faculty of Victoria University of Wellington as Head of the School of Architecture, rising to full professor in 2018.

Merwood-Salisbury's research focuses on the social aspects of building design. She says she is driven by the questions "Why do we design buildings a certain way? Why do we design rooms a certain way? What does it mean socially?”. She has published on 19th and 20th century American urban design but is also interested in the ways in which interior design, personal brands, and modern workplace needs influence architecture, and how material science can influence the materials chosen by building designers.

== Selected works ==
- Merwood-Salisbury, Joanna (19 January 2018), "Exterior interiors: the urban living room and beyond", in Coxhead, Vanessa (ed.), Interiors Beyond Architecture, Routledge, pp. 139–152, doi:10.4324/9781315647838-13, ISBN 978-1-315-64783-8
- Merwood-Salisbury, Joanna (2009). Chicago 1890: the skyscraper and the modern city. Chicago architecture and urbanism. Chicago, IL: University of Chicago Press. ISBN 978-0-226-52078-0.
- Merwood, Joanna (2009). "Patriotism and Protest: Union Square as Public Space, 1832–1932". Journal of the Society of Architectural Historians. 68 (4): 540–559. doi:10.1525/jsah.2009.68.4.540. Wikidata Q124102414.
- Merwood, Joanna (2013). "The first Chicago school and the ideology of the skyscraper". In Deamer, Peggy (ed.). Architecture and Capitalism: 1845 to the Present. Routledge. doi:10.4324/9780203499023. ISBN 978-0-203-49902-3. OL 53943966M. Wikidata Q124102410.
- Merwood, Joanna (2019). "Modern Architecture and Luxury: Aesthetics and the Evolution of the Modern Subject". Arts. 8 (3): 100. doi:10.3390/arts8030100. Wikidata Q124102404.
- Merwood, Joanna (2024). Barbarian Architecture: Thorstein Veblen's Chicago. MIT Press. ISBN 978-0-262-54741-3. OL 50710836M. Wikidata Q124152232.
