= Beatriz Colomina =

Spanish-born American historian (born 1952)

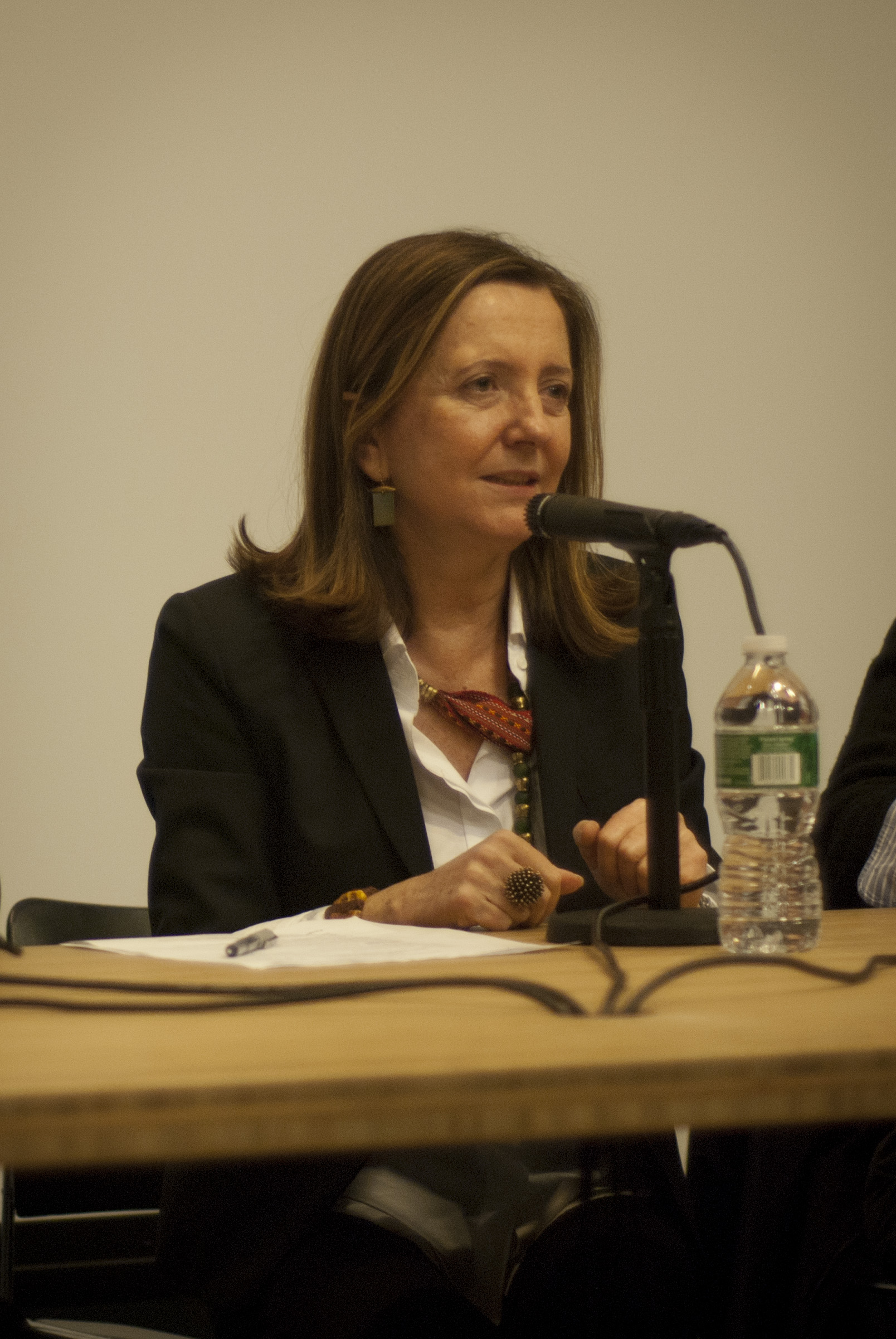
- Beatriz Colomina at GSAPP, 2011
- Born: 1952 (age 73–74); Madrid, Spain
- Known for: Art history, Architectural history, Architectural theory

Beatriz Colomina (born 1952) is a Spanish-American architecture historian, theorist, and curator. She is the founding director of the Program in Media and Modernity at Princeton University, the Howard Crosby Butler Professor of the History of Architecture and director of graduate studies (PhD program) in the School of Architecture.

== Early life and education ==
Colomina is from Valencia and she began her initial studies of architecture at the Technical university of Valencia. But she later moved to Escola Técnica Superior de Arquitectura de Barcelona, Universidad Politécnica de Barcelona, where she completed her education. Here, her interests in History, Theory & Urbanism were nurtured under the guidance of a group of teachers that included Josep Quetglas and Ignasi de Solà-Morales. Even as a student, she began working for the Department of History, Theory and Urbanism by translating two of Tafuri's writings, with an Italian friend. Shortly after her graduation, she was hired by the Department of Urbanism. Her acquaintance with Richard Sennett lead to a fellowship in New York Institute for the Humanities and she moved to the USA in 1981. The people she met at this interdisciplinary institute, like Carl Schorske, Susan Sontag and Wolfgang Schivelbusch had a major influence in her later work.

== Career ==
Colomina has built a multifaceted career through her work in academia, publishing, and exhibitions, contributing to each of these fields over the course of her professional career.

=== Academia ===
She began her teaching at the age of 23, in Barcelona immediately after her graduation. After a short break, during which she served the fellowship at the New York Institute for the Humanities, her teaching career continued when she moved to Columbia University in 1982. She later moved to Princeton University in 1988 and continues teaching there.

Besides her role as a tenured professor, she has lectured extensively. She has lectured at the Museum of Modern Art in NYC, the Architectural Institute of Japan, Guggenheim in NY, the Center for Contemporary Art and Architecture in Stockholm, the DIA Art Foundation in NY, Tate Britain in London, Harvard University, Yale University, Columbia University, ETH in Zurich, Delft University, Bauhaus University in Weimar, Middle East Technical University in Ankara, Lebanese American University, University of Beirut, and Seoul University. She serves on the advisory board of several institutions.

She was awarded the 2020 Ada Louise Huxtable Prize. Notable doctoral students of Colomina's include architectural historian Joanna Merwood-Salisbury.

=== Awards and fellowships ===
- 2020 Ada Louise Huxtable Prize
- 2007 Canadian Centre for Architecture Mellon Fellowship
- 2005 Princeton University President's Award for Distinguished Teaching
- 1995-1996 Samuel H. Kress Senior Fellowship at the CASVA
- 1987 Graham Foundation Grant
- SOM Foundation
- Le Corbusier Foundation
- The American Academy in Berlin and the Getty Center in Los Angeles

=== Publishing ===
Colomina has written about architecture and the modern institutions of representation, particularly the printed media, photography, advertising, film and TV. Her books have received recognitions including International Book Award by the American Institute of Architects for Sexuality and Space (1993) & Privacy and Publicity (1995).

Some of her early contributions to other publications include The Sex of Architecture (Abrams, 1996), Dan Graham (2001), Philip Johnson: The Constancy of Change (2009), Domesticity at War (2007), Cold War Hothouses (2004), Raumplan Versus Plan Libre: Adolf Loos and Le Corbusier (1988). She has authored numerous articles and has been on the editorial board of such periodicals as Assemblage, Daidalos, and Grey Room.

=== Exhibitions ===
Colomina has curated, often in collaboration with her students, a number of international exhibitions.

==== Clip/Stamp/Fold (2006) ====
An exhibition created by Colomina as a provocation in itself and as an exploration of the relationship between architecture and media. It is the outcome of research work taken up with her students at Princeton on 'little magazines of the 1960s and 70s'. This exhibition was originally held at New York's Storefront for Art and Architecture in 2006. It has since traveled to many locations worldwide, including the Canadian Centre for Architecture in Montreal in 2007; the Architectural Association in London in 2008; and the GAM Cultural Centre in Santiago de Chile in 2013.

==== Playboy Architecture: 1953–1979 (2012) ====
The exhibition showcased how the fields of Architecture and Design helped shape the Playboy Fantasy and how the Playboy magazine helped spread new and radical architectural ideas. It was displayed in the Netherlands at Bureau Europa (Maastricht) in 2012 and at Elmhurst Art Museum, Elmhurst, Illinois in 2016.

==== Radical Pedagogies: Reconstructing Architectural Education (2014) ====
The exhibition is the result of an on-going collaborative research project with her doctoral students at Princeton. The research focuses on architectural educational programs and schools that emerged post war and were strongly tied to the social changes of that time. It was first displayed in the Monditalia section of the Venice Biennale 2014 and has been exhibited in several locations since.

==== Curatorship ====
Colomina was the chief curator of Curated by Vienna: The Century of the Bed in Vienna in 2014 and was co-curator of the third Istanbul Design Biennial (2016) on the theme Are We Human? The Design of the Species. She exhibited an installation at the inaugural biennale of Architecture and Urbanism in Seoul in 2017.

== Personal life ==
Beatriz Colomina is married to New Zealand born architect and author Mark Wigley, who has collaborated with her on several occasions.

== Bibliography ==
- X-Ray Architecture, Lars Müller Publishers, 2019. ISBN 978-3-03778-443-3
- Are We Human? Notes on an Archeology of Design, (with Mark Wigley), Lars Müller Publishers, 2019. ISBN 978-3-03778-511-9
- Das Andere/The Other: A Journal for the Introduction of Western Culture into Austria, MAK Center for Art and Architecture, 2016. ISBN 3037784814, 978-3037784815
- The Century of the Bed, Verlag für Moderne Kunst, 2015. ISBN 3869845287, 978-3869845289
- Manifesto Architecture: The Ghost of Mies, Sternberg Press, 2014. ISBN 3956790006, 978-3956790003
- Clip/Stamp/Fold: The Radical Architecture of Little Magazines 196X-197X, Actar, 2010. ISBN 8496954528, 978-8496954526
- Domesticity at War, The MIT Press, 2007. ISBN 0262033615, 978-0262033619
- Privacy and Publicity: Modern Architecture as Mass Media, The MIT Press, 1994. ISBN 0262032147, 978-0262032148
- Sexuality and Space, Princeton Architectural Press, 1992. ISBN 1878271083, 978-1878271082
- Wilkinson, Tom. 2020. “Ada Louise Huxtable Prize – Beatriz Colomina : The Internationally Acclaimed Feminist Writer Shines a Spotlight on Sexual Prejudice and Representation in Architecture.” Architectural Review, no. 1469 (March): 108–111.
