= Melvin Charney =

Canadian artist and architect

Melvin Charney C.Q. (28 August 1935 – 17 September 2012) was a Canadian artist and architect.

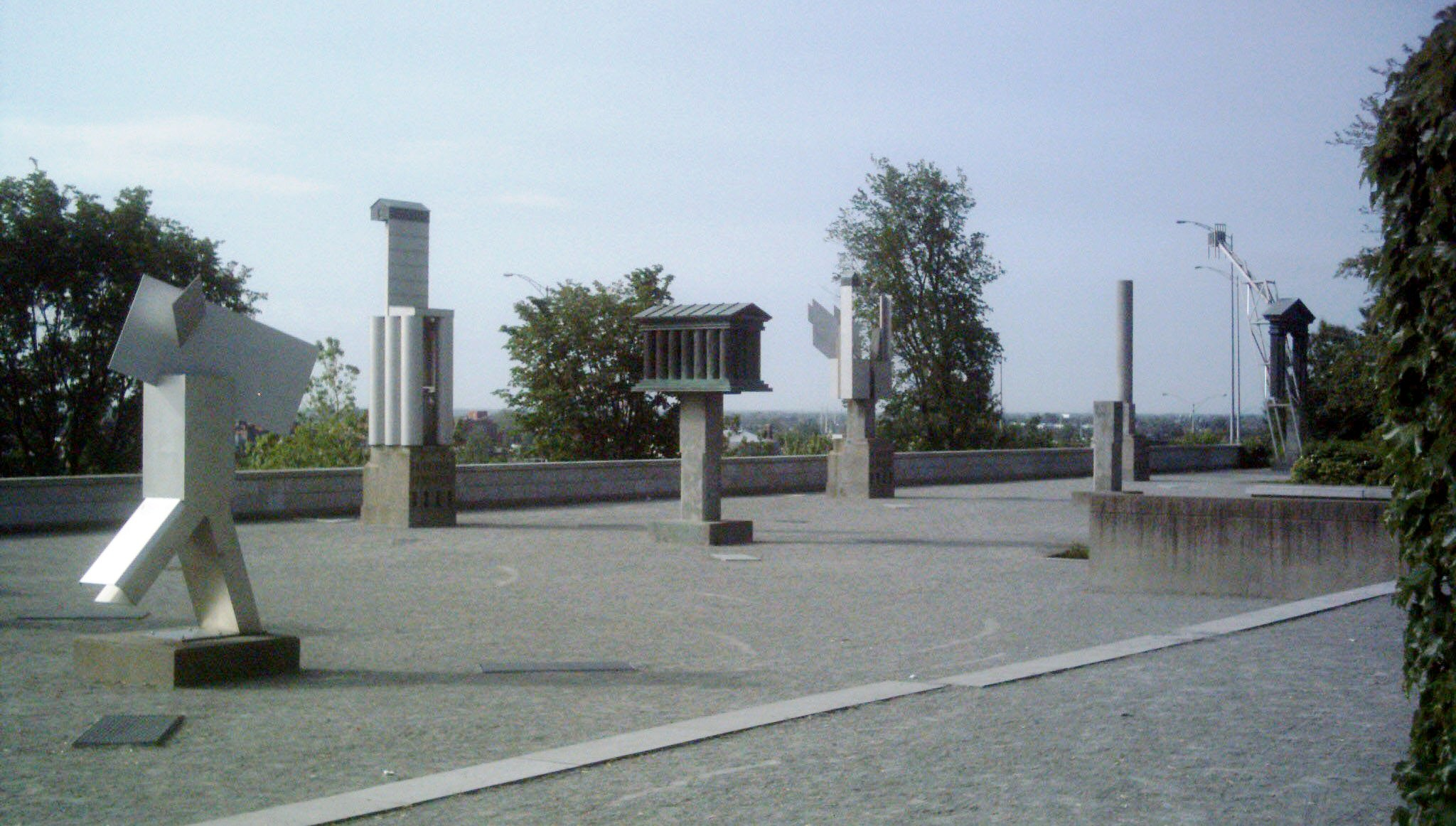
Charney's sculpture garden at the Canadian Centre for Architecture

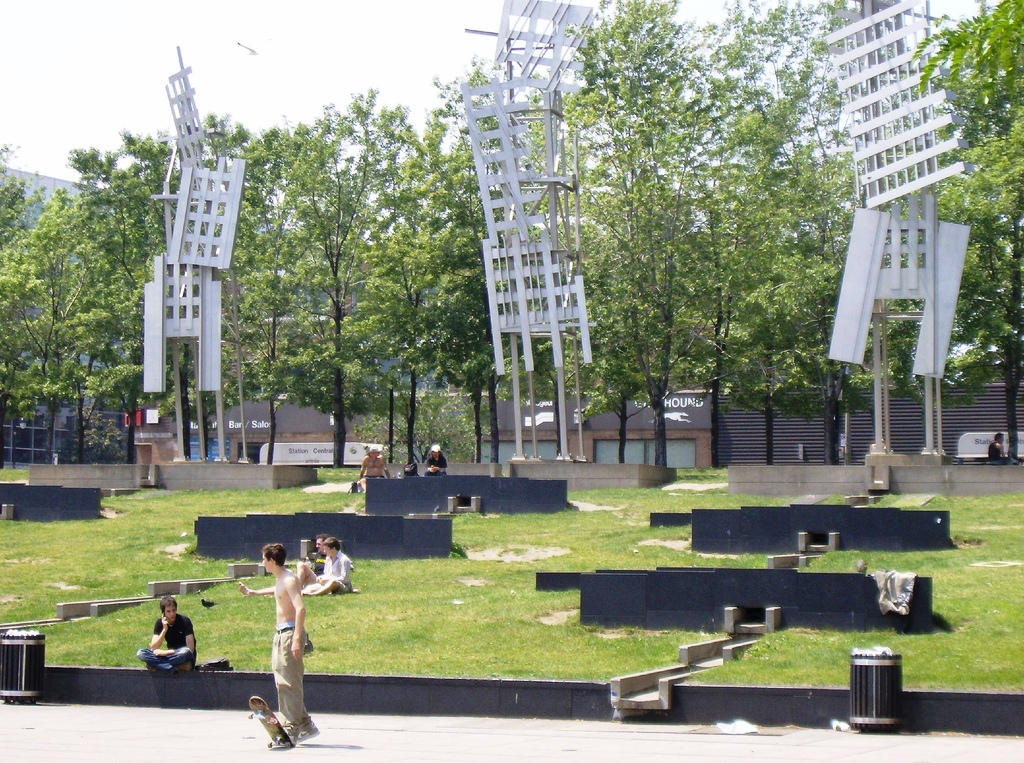
Skyscraper, Waterfall, Brooks — A Construction

== Career ==
Charney grew up in a working-class family in The Plateau neighbourhood of Montreal, the eldest of three sons of Hyman and Fanny Charney. Fanny was originally from what is now Belarus, and worked in a sewing factory. Hyman Charney was from Poland, and worked as a paint salesman as well as an accomplished woodworker and decorator, creating doors for synagogues and churches. Hyman was also interested in visual arts, and from a young age, Melvin took Saturday classes at the Montreal Museum of Fine Arts. Later in his childhood the family was able to afford to move to the edge of Outremont.

He studied architecture at McGill University and Yale University, and worked in Paris and New York before returning to Montreal in 1964, where he opened his architecture practice and began teaching at the Université de Montréal.

Charney submitted a design for the Canadian pavilion at Expo 70 which would be fashioned from construction cranes and scaffolding. His submission, while not successful, signalled Charney's shift away from building design to public art. His depiction of historic buildings demolished to make way for Expo 67 and the Montreal Olympic Games in the short-lived Corrid’art exhibit is reported to be a primary reason why mayor Jean Drapeau ordered the exhibition demolished. Notable public art works by Charney in Montreal include the sculpture garden at the Canadian Centre for Architecture and the sculpture Skyscraper, Waterfall, Brooks — A Construction at Place Émilie-Gamelin, both constructed after Drapeau left office.

In 2003, he was named a Chevalier (Knight) of the Ordre national du Québec for his outstanding accomplishments and contributions to the growth of Quebec. In 2006, he was named a Commandeur of the Ordre des Arts et des Lettres by the government of France for his contributions to culture. He was married to writer Ann Charney.
