= Dieter Appelt =

German photographer, painter, sculptor and video artist

- Born: 3 March 1935 (age 91); Niemegk, Brandenburg, Germany
- Known for: Photography, Painting and Sculpture

Dieter Appelt (born 3 March 1935 in Niemegk) is a German photographer, painter, sculptor and video artist.

He studied music from 1954 to 1958 in the Mendelssohn Bartholdy Akademie in Leipzig. There, he discovers and develops a strong interest for Impressionism, Fauvism, and Russian constructivism. In 1959, he left East Germany and settled in West Berlin to study in the music school of Berlin until 1964. That same year, he decided to study fine art and he takes his first steps in painting, photography, etching, and sculpture. In the 1970s, he debuted on the public stage, with his first exhibition at the Deutsche Oper Berlin in 1974. In 1976 he focused in on visual arts and his career as an artist takes off. Appelt is also known for his works on the mechanics and techniques of photography that he made in the 1980s. In 1990 and 1999, he took part in the Venice Biennale. During this decade, Dieter Appelt exhibited in several major capitals of the world including: Tokyo, New-York, Berlin, Moscow, Budapest, Montreal, and Edinburgh. He lives and works in Berlin.
