= Alain Paiement =

Canadian artist

- Born: 1960 (age 65–66); Montreal, Quebec
- Known for: Photography
- Style: Installations, sculptures, and photomontage

Alain Paiement (born 1960 in Montreal, Quebec) is a Canadian artist. His work is mainly made from photography in form of installations, sculptures, and photomontage. His themes are related to geography, topography and architecture and mainly concerned by the construction of vision. A photo of the French artist Pierre Estable's apartment titled "Living Chaos" has been exhibited at the Galerie Clark from May 10 to June 17, 2001.

== Main exhibitions ==
- Cells: Leo Kamen Gallery, Toronto, 2008
- Expansibles et Mosaïques Fluides: Intégration à l'architecture, Pavillon de biologie de l'UQÀM, Montréal, 2006
- Le monde en chantier: Galerie de l'UQÀM, Montréal, 2002; Musée national des beaux-arts du Québec, Québec, 2004; Oakville Galleries, Oakville, 2004.
- Refaire surface / Surfacing: Galerie Clark, Montréal, 2001; Tinglado 2, Tarragone, Espagne, 2004; Espace Contretype, Bruxelles, 2006; Maison Hongroise de la photographie, Budapest, 2007.
- Tangent/e: Canadian Centre for Architecture, Montréal, 2003
- Bruxelles à l'infini: Présenté par la galerie Contretype dans l'ancienne glacière de St-Gilles, Bruxelles, 2000; International center of contemporary art, Cracovie, 2006; Museu de Arte Brasileira, Sao Paulo, 2007.
- Sometimes Square: Musée d'art contemporain de Montréal, Montréal, 1994; Galerie VU, Québec, 1996; Musée d'art moderne et d'art contemporain de la Ville de Liège, 1997.
- Cent jours d'art contemporain: Chantier (Building Sight), Centre international d'art contemporain, Montréal, 1991
- Power of City / City of Power: Whitney Museum of American Art, New York, 1992
- Photo sculpture: Galerie Optica, Montréal, 1991; Centre Vu, Québec; Tournée canadienne (Oakville, Rimouski, Calgary, Edmonton)
- Amphitheatres: The Power Plant, Toronto, 1989; Centre culturel canadien à Paris, Paris, 1988
- Waterdampstrukturen: Galerie Appart' art actuel, Montréal, 1985
- Beyond Polders: Ancienne Brasserie Eckers, Montréal, 1987

== Bibliography ==
- Alain Paiement. Le monde en chantier. Ninacs, Anne-Marie; Montréal, Galerie de l'UQÀM, 2002, 143 p.
- Image and Inscription: An Anthology of Contemporary Canadian Photography, Edited by Robert Bean, Gallery 44 et YYZ Books, 2005
- Alain Paiement, … the world as I found it. Yam Lau, Alain Paiement & Patrick Pellerin, Pratt Manhattan Gallery, Pratt Institute Editions, New York, 2003
- Tangent/e: Alain Paiement. von Amelunxen, Hubertus, Montréal, Canadian Centre for Architecture, 2003, 65 p.
- Des espèces d'espaces. Jean, Marie-Josée; Grande, Chantal; Montréal, VOX, Tarragone, Tinglado, 2003, 88 p.
- Photographie plasticienne: Un art paradoxal. Baqué, Dominique, Éditions du Regard, Paris, 1998, 328 p.
- Univers Urbains : La représentation de la ville dans l'art québécois du xx^{e} siècle. Trépanier, Esther, Musée du Québec, Québec, 1998, 94 p.
- Sometimes Square : Le regard au carreau ou la conviction du pixel. Bélisle, Josée, Musée d'art contemporain de Montréal, 1994
- Alain Paiement: Amphitheatres, Fischer, Barbara, 1989, The Power Plant - Contemporary Art at Harbourfront, Toronto, 1989, 16 p
