= Giovanna Borasi =

Italian architect

- Born: 1971 (age 54–55); Milan, Italy
- Occupation: Architect
- Practice: Canadian Centre for Architecture

Giovanna Borasi (born 1971 in Milan, Italy) is Director of the Canadian Centre for Architecture (CCA) in Montreal, Quebec, Canada since 2020. She first joined the CCA as Curator for Contemporary Architecture in 2005. Borasi was educated in architecture at politecnico di Milano in 1996 and has worked as a writer and editor in addition to her curatorial activities.

== Curatorial work ==
Giovanna Borasi’s exhibitions and related books explore contemporary issues and reflect her interest in alternative ways of practicing architecture. Exhibitions curated and co-curated by Borasi at the Canadian Centre for Architecture specifically address how environmental, political and social issues are influencing today’s built environment:

- Imperfect Health: The Medicalization of Architecture (2011, with Mirko Zardini)
- Journeys: How Travelling Fruit, Ideas and Buildings Rearrange our Environment (2010)
- Other Space Odysseys: Greg Lynn, Michael Maltzan, Alessandro Poli (2010, with Mirko Zardini)
- Actions: What You Can Do With the City (2008, with Mirko Zardini)
- Some Ideas on Living in London and Tokyo by Stephen Taylor and Ryue Nishizawa (2008)
- 1973: Sorry, Out of Gas (2007, with Mirko Zardini)
- Environment: Approaches for Tomorrow - Gilles Clément and Philippe Rahm (2006)

Borasi’s exhibitions are recognized internationally: "Imperfect Health: The Medicalization of Architecture" was also presented at Carnegie Mellon University, Pittsburgh and was named the best exhibition of 2012 by Design Observer. "Actions: What You Can Do With the City" was also presented at the Graham Foundation, Chicago, and in an abbreviated form at the International Architecture Biennial in São Paulo, Brazil.

Prior to her appointment at the CCA, Borasi co-curated an exhibition about asphalt with Mirko Zardini for a 2003 exhibition at the Triennale di Milano:

- Asfalto: Il carattere della città, Triennale di Milano, Milan, Italy (2003).

== Editorial work ==
Borasi initiated her career as editor and writer for Lotus International (1998-2005), and served as assistant editor for the book series Quaderni di Lotus (1999). She was member of the editorial staff of the graphic design magazine Lettera (2000), a supplement to the magazine Abitare. She was Deputy Editor in Chief for Abitare (2011-2013).

== Selected bibliography ==
- Borasi, Giovanna. "Studio ALBORI", The State of the Art of Architecture, Grima, Joseph, et al., eds. Zürich: Lars Müller Publishers, 2015. ISBN 9783037784754
- Borasi, Giovanna, ed. The Other Architect. Leipzig: Spector Books, Montreal: Canadian Centre for Architecture, 2015. ISBN 9783959050401
- Borasi, Giovanna and Daria Der Kaloustian, eds. CCA on Paper. Montreal: Canadian Centre for Architecture, 2013. ISBN 9781927071045
- Borasi, Giovanna and Mirko Zardini, eds. Imperfect Health: The Medicalization of Architecture. Montreal: Canadian Centre for Architecture, 2012. ISBN 9781927071014
- Borasi, Giovanna, ed. Journeys: How Travelling Fruit, Ideas and Buildings Rearrange our Environment. Montreal: Canadian Centre for Architecture, 2011. ISBN 9788492861545
- Borasi, Giovanna and Mirko Zardini, eds. Other Space Odysseys: Greg Lynn, Michael Maltzan, Alessandro Poli. Montreal: Canadian Centre for Architecture, 2010. ISBN 9780920785881
- Borasi, Giovanna and Mirko Zardini, eds. Actions: What You Can Do With the City. Montreal: Canadian Centre for Architecture, 2009. ISBN 9780920785829
- Borasi, Giovanna, ed. Some Ideas on Living in London and Tokyo: Stephen Taylor, Ryue Nishizawa. Montreal: Canadian Centre for Architecture, 2008. ISBN 9783037781500
- Borasi, Giovanna and Mirko Zardini, eds. Sorry, Out of Gas: Architecture’s Response to the 1973 Oil Crisis. Montreal: Canadian Centre for Architecture, 2008. ISBN 9780920785782
