= Ole Bouman =

Dutch-German historian

Ole Bouman (born 1960, Amersfoort) is a Dutch German historian, writer, curator in urbanism design and architecture. Bouman is the founding director of Design Society, an initiative of China Merchants Group and the Victoria and Albert Museum in Shenzhen, which opened in December 2017.

== Publications ==
- And justice for all… (1994)
- The Invisible in Architecture (1994)
- Destination Future (1996)
- RealSpace in QuickTimes: Architecture and Digitization (1997)
- Egotecture (1998)
- On the Age of Two Millennia: Essays on the Future of Architecture (1999)
- 3D>2D: The Designers Republic's Adventures in and Out of Architecture (2001)
- Kas Oosterhuis (2002)
- The Battle for Time (2003)
- Architecture, Liquid, Gas (2005)
- Disappearing Architecture: From Real to Virtual to Quantum (2005)
- Al Manakh (2007)
- Architecture of Consequence (2009)
- Testify! – the Consequences of Architecture (2011)
- Dutch Architecture in 250 Highlights (2012)
- Value Factory Academy: A School as Risk (2014, unpublished)
- The Making of Design Society (2017)
- Wang Shu and Amateur Architecture Studio (2017)
