= Canadian Centre for Architecture =

Architecture museum and research centre in Quebec, Canada

- Centre canadien d'architecture
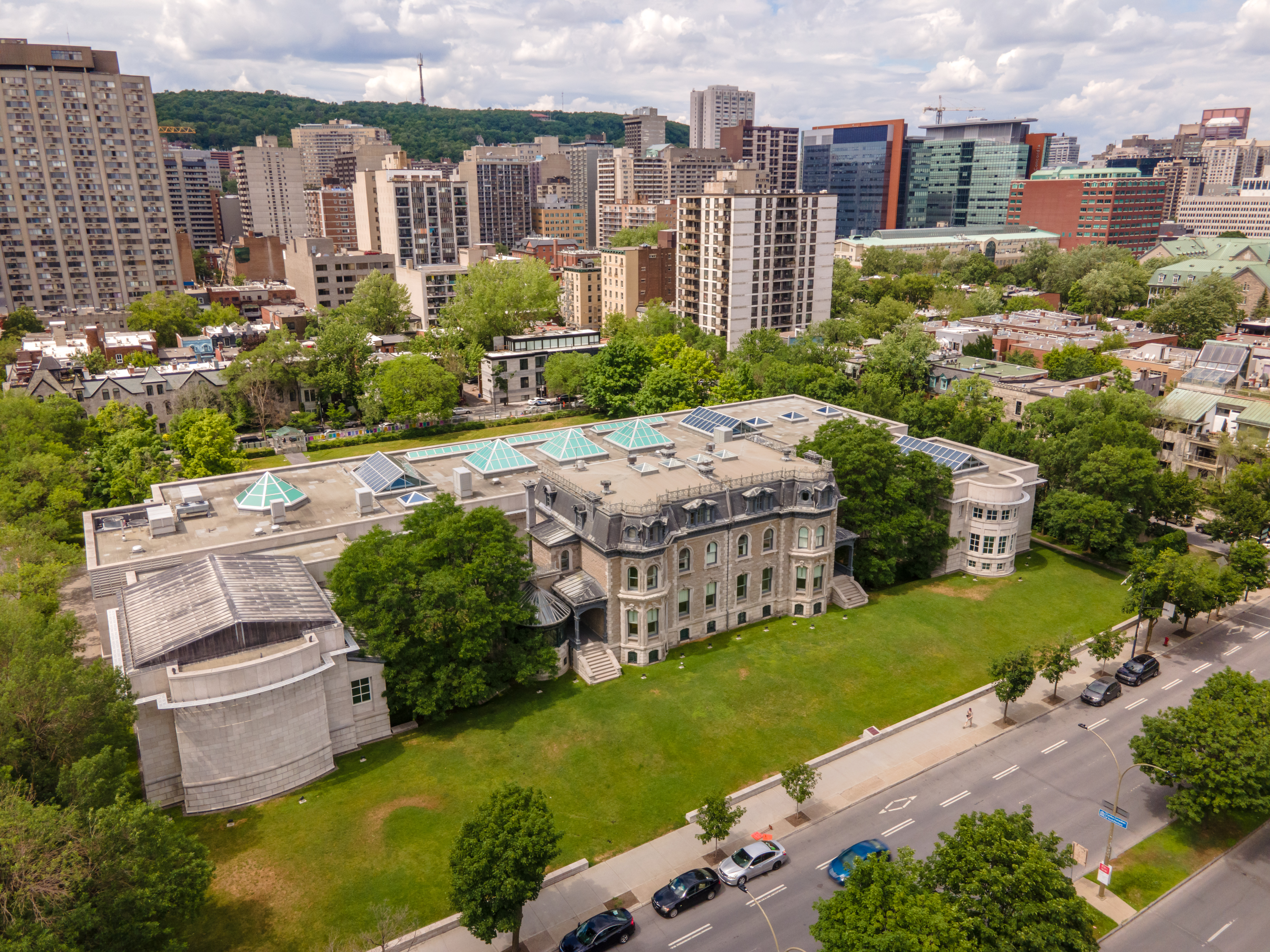

- Location of the centre in Montreal
- Established: 1979
- Location: 1920, rue Baile; Montreal, Quebec, Canada
- Coordinates: 45°29′27.6″N 73°34′42.8″W
- Type: Architecture museum
- Visitors: 67,666 (2011)
- Director: Giovanna Borasi
- Public transit access: at Guy–Concordia station, Georges-Vanier station
- Website: cca.qc.ca

The Canadian Centre for Architecture (CCA; French: Centre Canadien d'Architecture) is a museum of architecture and research centre in Montreal, Quebec, Canada. It is located at 1920, rue Baile (1920, Baile Street), between rue Fort (Fort Street) and rue Saint-Marc (Saint-Marc Street) in what was once part of the Golden Square Mile. Today, it is considered to be located in the Shaughnessy Village neighbourhood of the borough of Ville-Marie.

Phyllis Lambert is the founding director emerita, Bruce Kuwabara is chair of the board of trustees, Giovanna Borasi is the director.

The CCA contains a large library and archives, and is host to various exhibits throughout the year. It is also home to a study centre open to the general public. The CCA provides educational programs and cultural activities.

The CCA was designed and built by Peter Rose. It has an architectural garden located on the southern side of René Lévesque Boulevard. The sculpture garden was designed by architect Melvin Charney.

== History ==
The CCA was founded in 1979 by Montreal architect Phyllis Lambert. The purpose of the centre was to promote public awareness of the role architecture plays in society, as well as to encourage scholarly architectural research and to foster innovative design practices.

The CCA was designed and constructed between 1985 and 1989 by Montreal architect Peter Rose. The design of the museum incorporates the Shaughnessy House mansion, built for Thomas Shaughnessy, a Second Empire-style mansion that Lambert purchased in 1974 to prevent its demolition.

The CCA received the Honor Award for Architecture from the American Institute of Architects and the Governor General's Medals in Architecture in 1992.

== Building ==
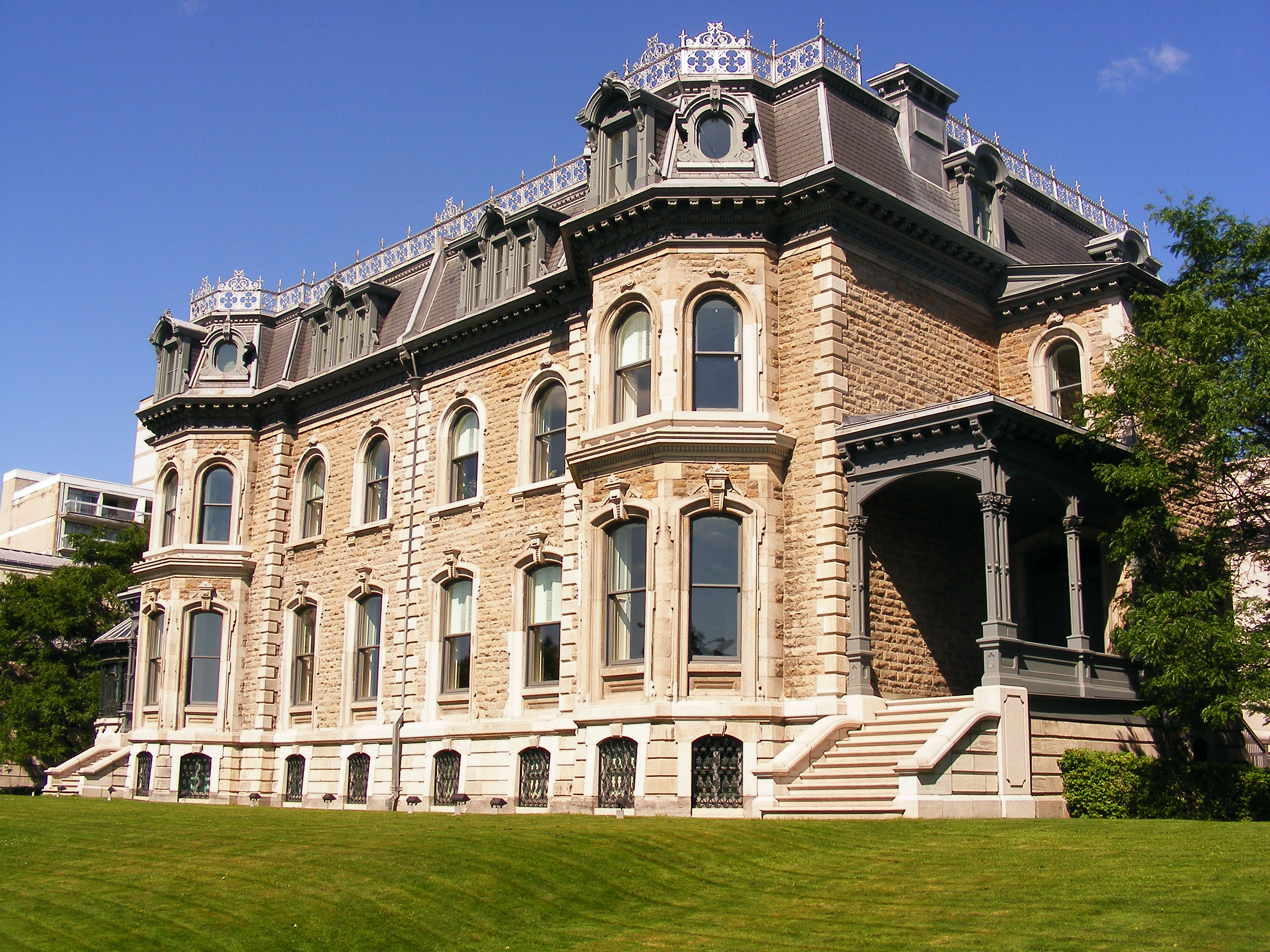
Shaughnessy House, built in 1874

Room with wood finishes

The current building, which opened in 1989, surrounds Shaughnessy House and was designed by Peter Rose, in collaboration with Phyllis Lambert and Erol Argun. The historic Shaughnessy House, located at 1923 Dorchester Street West (today René Lévesque Boulevard), was built in 1874 according to plans by William Tutin Thomas. It is one of the few nineteenth-century mansions in Montreal that is accessible to the public.

The CCA building, with a surface area of roughly 12,000 square metres (130,000 sq ft), is home to exhibit halls, the Paul Desmarais Theatre, a bookstore, the library, and a study centre in the Alcan Wing. It also contains restoration laboratories and conservation offices. The work of conservation and restoration of Shaughnessy House, with a floor area of over 1,900 square metres (20,000 sq ft), was carried out under the direction of Denis Saint-Louis. Also inside is the Devencore Conservatory and reception rooms.

Due to its size, location and use of traditional and modern materials, combining structural aluminum with grey Montreal limestone, the CCA building's architecture blends past and present. Its landscapes, including the CCA sculpture garden facing the building on the south side of René Lévesque Boulevard, were designed according to the ecology of each location. Most of the rooms at Shaughnessy House have been restored to their original 1874 state.

The "Van Horne / Shaughnessy House" was listed as a National Historic Site of Canada in 1973, and as a Historical Monument of Quebec on 6 February 1974.

House interior

Conservatory

Entrance stairs of the museum

Octagonal Gallery

== Collection and exhibits ==
Main Galleries

Bookstore

The CCA has large collections of books and artifacts touching on the built environment and certain aspects of industrial design. Within the general collections it has special collections such as those pertaining to architectural games for children, universal exhibitions and their architecture, and significant architects including Ernest Cormier, Peter Eisenman, Arthur Erickson, John Hejduk, Cedric Price, Aldo Rossi, James Stirling, and the artist Gordon Matta-Clark.

The centre holds regular exhibitions made up of research on thematic subjects, different aspects of its collections, and hosts touring exhibits from other museums. The centre offers tours adapted to specific groups and educational programs for children. It also has a bookstore, a concert hall, and gardens. The sculpture garden which lies across René Lévesque Boulevard offers a full scale ghost-like lower shell of the bottom part of the Shaughnessy mansion, and assorted modernistic sculptures or constructs which are developed around the theme of architecture.

The centre's study room is open to the public by appointment. It celebrated its 20th anniversary in 2009.

== Lectures series ==
Over the years, CCA has organized a variety of lectures and presentations,

== Sculpture garden ==
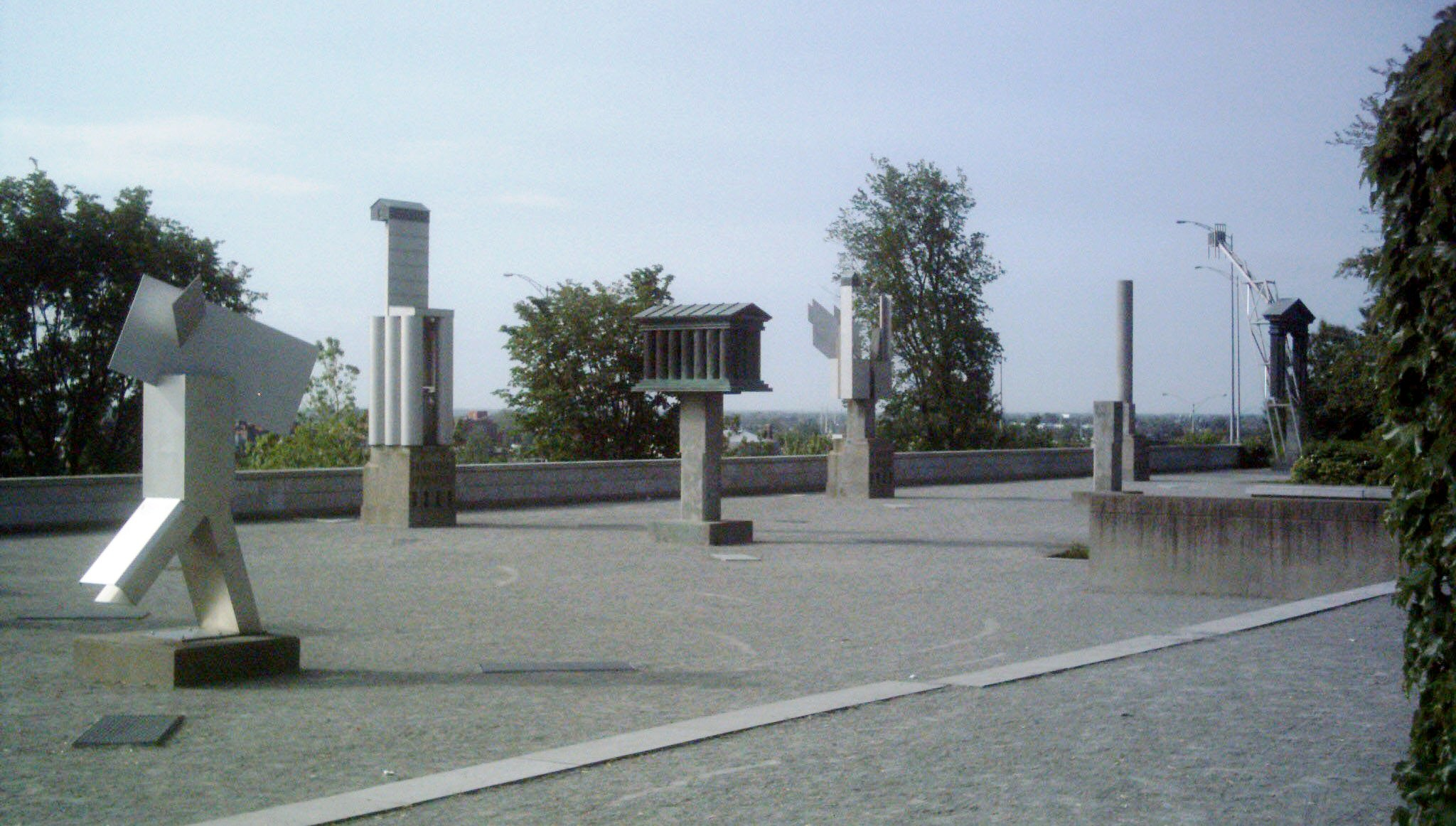
Melvin Charney's sculpture garden, in front of the CCA

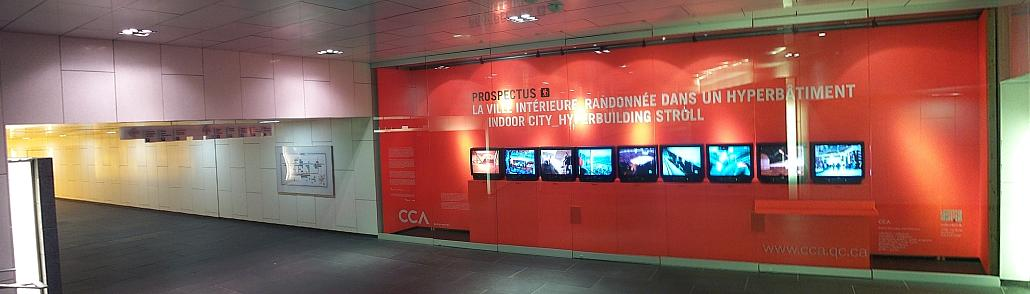
CCA display in Montreal's Underground City

The mansion faces a sculpture garden by Melvin Charney on the south side of René Lévesque Boulevard. Located in between René-Lévesque Boulevard and the Ville-Marie Expressway, it is a park, Esplanade Ernest Cormier, in an area of heavy traffic and is at the edge of a cliff. The park contains a set of sculptures that depict aspects of architecture, and include a reproduction of the base of the facade and size of Shaughnessy House. The vegetation is mixed with sections of open walls. Architectural fixtures and furniture items are placed on pedestals.

== Affiliations ==
The Museum is affiliated with: CMA, CHIN, and Virtual Museum of Canada.

== See also ==
- Architecture of Montreal
- Architecture of Canada
- Examination for Architects in Canada
- Rudolf Fränkel – his inheritance lies at the CCA
- Modern architecture
- Society for the Study of Architecture in Canada
