= Nelson-Atkins Museum of Art =

Art museum in Kansas City, Missouri

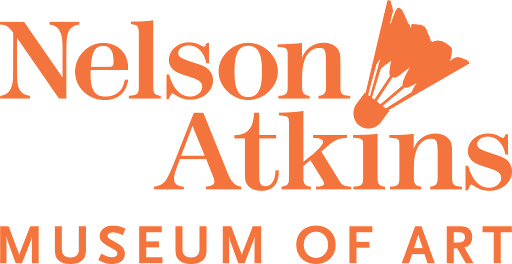

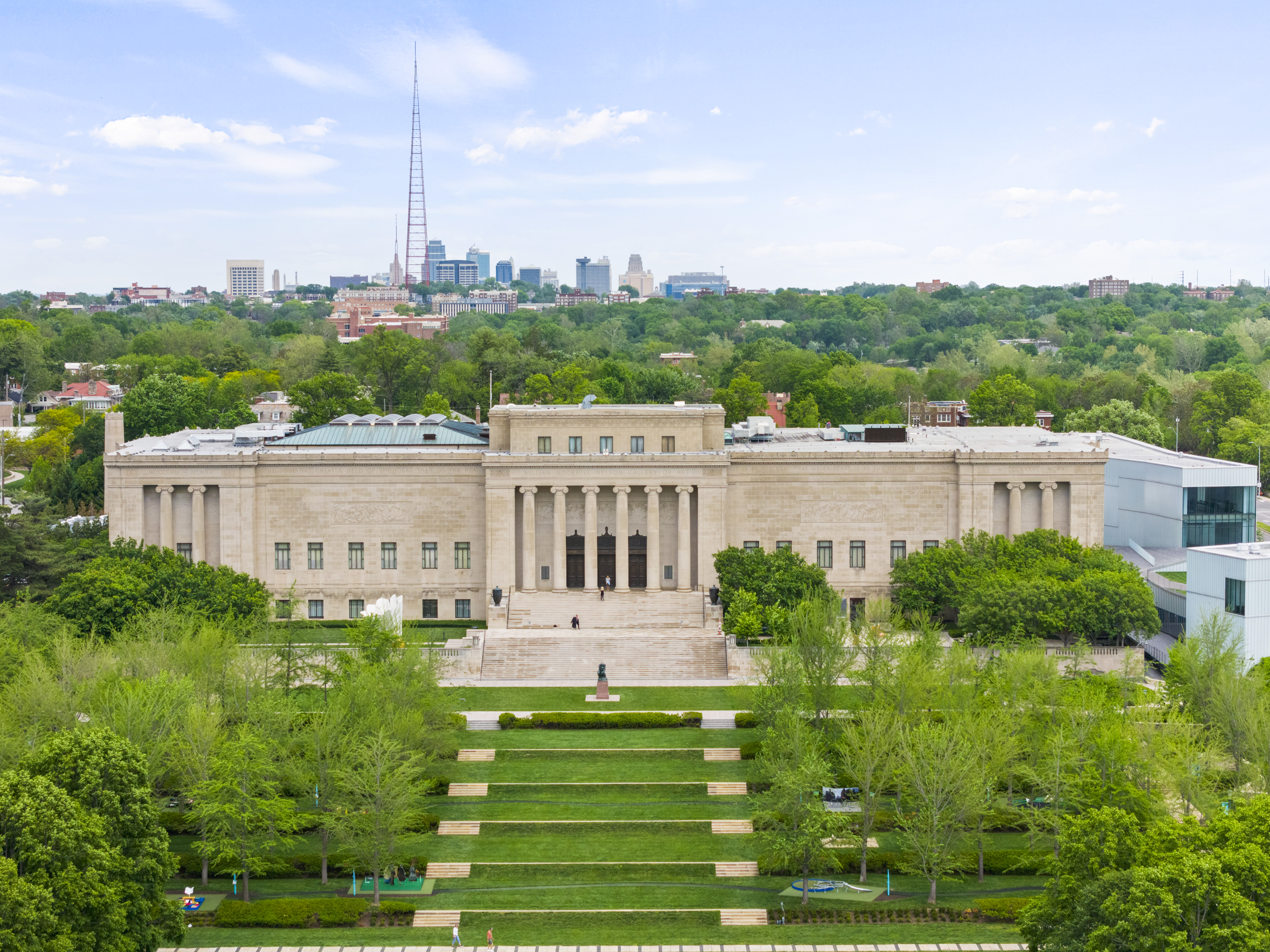
- South façade of the original museum building with the Kansas City skyline in the background.
- Former name: William Rockhill Nelson Gallery of Art
- Established: 1933; 93 years ago
- Location: 4525 Oak St; Kansas City, Missouri; United States
- Coordinates: 39°2′43.11″N 94°34′51.03″W
- Type: Art museum
- Collection size: 40,000 works
- Visitors: 508,000 (2022-23)
- Director: Julián Zugazagoitia
- Website: www.nelson-atkins.org

The Nelson-Atkins Museum of Art is an art museum in Kansas City, Missouri, known for its encyclopedic collection of art from nearly every continent and culture, and especially for its extensive collection of Asian art.

In 2007, Time magazine ranked the museum's new Bloch Building number one on its list of "The 10 Best (New and Upcoming) Architectural Marvels" which considered candidates from around the globe.

The museum is open five days a week: Monday from 10 am-5 pm, closed Tuesday and Wednesday, open Thursday 10-9, Friday 10-9, Saturday and Sunday 10-5. Admission is free.

== History ==
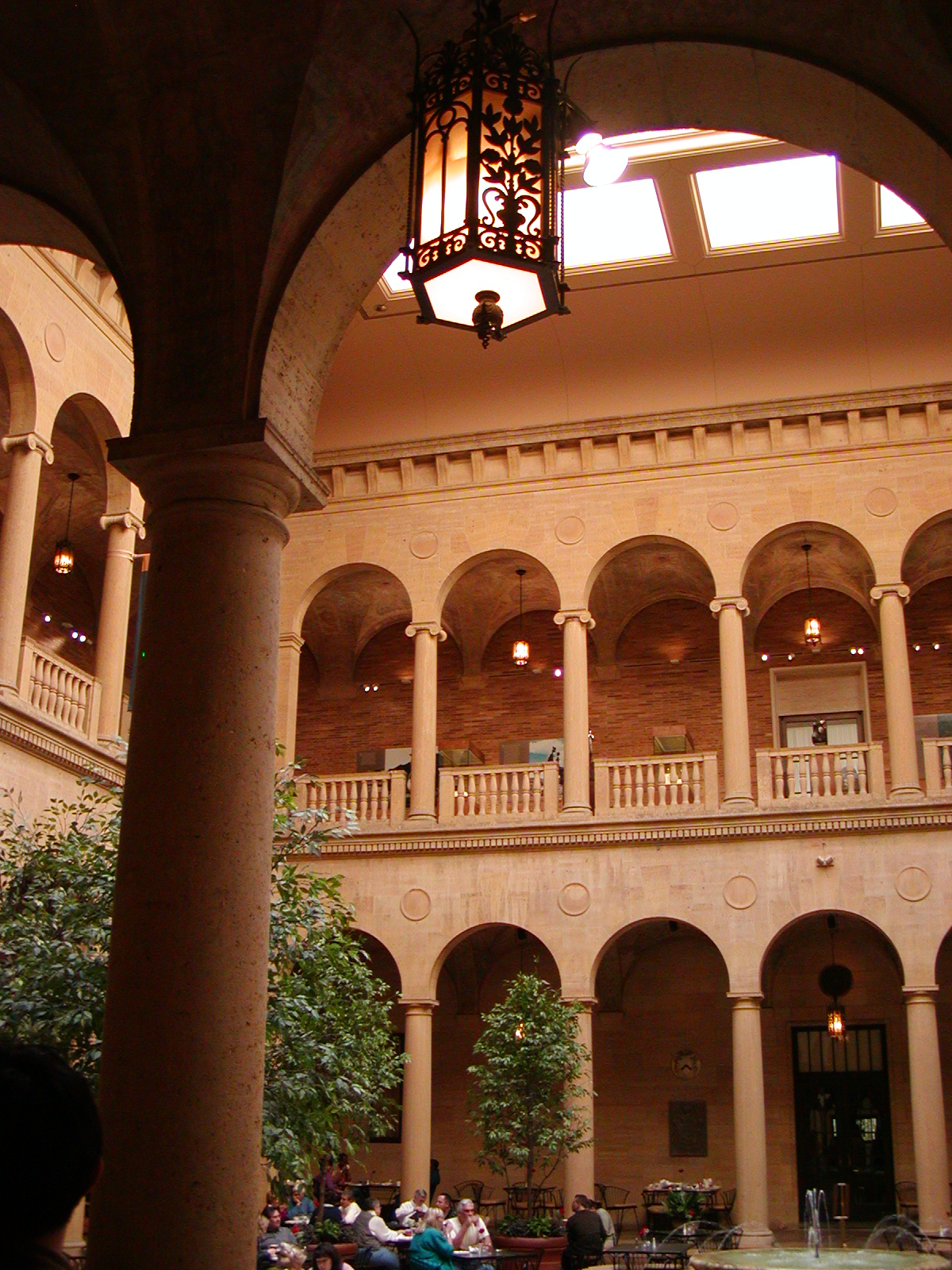
Cafe in the museum

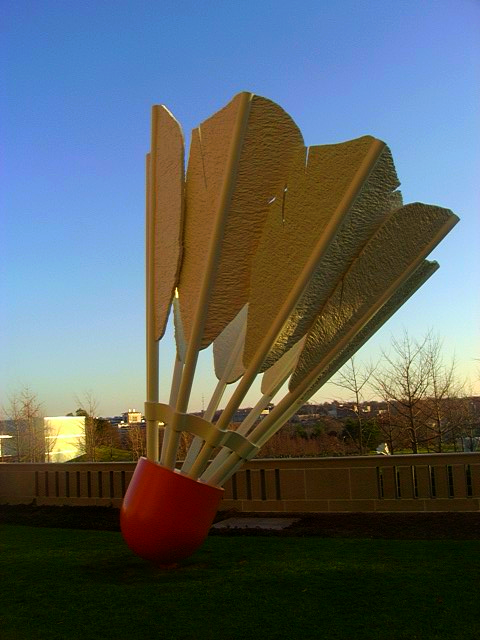
Shuttlecock

The museum was built on the grounds of Oak Hall, the home of Kansas City Star publisher William Rockhill Nelson (1841–1915). When he died in 1915, his will provided that upon the deaths of his wife and daughter, the proceeds of his entire estate would go to purchasing artwork for public enjoyment. This bequest was augmented by additional funds from the estates of Nelson's daughter, son-in-law and attorney.

In 1911, former schoolteacher Mary McAfee Atkins (1836–1911), widow of real estate speculator James Burris Atkins, bequeathed $300,000 to establish an art museum. Through sound management of the estate and a booming economy in the Roaring Twenties, this amount grew to $700,000 by 1927. Original plans called for two art museums based on the separate bequests (with the Atkins Museum to be located in Penn Valley Park). However, trustees of the two estates decided to combine the two bequests along with smaller bequests from others to make a single major art institution.

The building was designed by prominent Kansas City architects Wight and Wight, who also designed the approaches to the Liberty Memorial and the Kansas governor's mansion, Cedar Crest. Ground was broken in July 1930, and the museum opened December 11, 1933. The building's classical Beaux-Arts architecture style was modeled on the Cleveland Museum of Art. Thomas Wight, the brother who did most of the design work for the building said:

We are building the museum on classic principles because they have been proved by the centuries. A distinctly American principle appropriate for such a building may be developed, but, so far, everything of that kind is experimental. One doesn't experiment with two-and-a-half million dollars.

When the original building opened, its final cost was $2.75 million (about $54 million in 2018). The dimensions of the six-story structure were 390 feet (120 m) long by 175 feet (53 m) wide, making it larger than the Cleveland Museum of Art.

The museum, which was locally referred to as the Nelson Art Gallery or simply the Nelson Gallery, was actually two museums until 1983 when it was formally named the Nelson-Atkins Museum of Art. Previously the east wing was called the Atkins Museum of Fine Arts, while the west wing and lobby was called the William Rockhill Nelson Gallery of Art.

On the exterior of the building Charles Keck created 23 limestone panels depicting the march of civilization from east to west including wagon trains heading west from Westport Landing. Grillwork in the doors depict oak leaf motifs in memory of Oak Hall. The south facade of the museum is an iconic structure in Kansas City that looms over a series of terraces onto Brush Creek.

About the same time as the construction of the museum, Howard Vanderslice donated 8 acres (32,000 m^{2}) to the west of the museum, across Oak Street, for the Kansas City Art Institute, which moved from the Deardorf Building at 11th and Main streets in downtown Kansas City.

As William Nelson, the major contributor, donated money rather than a personal art collection, the curators were able to assemble a collection from scratch. At the height of the Great Depression, the worldwide art market was flooded with pieces for sale, but there were very few buyers. As such, the museum's buyers found a vast market open to them. The acquisitions grew quickly and within a short time, the Nelson-Atkins had one of the largest art collections in the country.

One of the original components of the building was a re-creation of Nelson's oak paneled room from Oak Hall (and namesake of the estate). The room contained Nelson's red plush easy chair and bookcases. The room was dismantled in 1988 to make way for a photography studio.

One-third of the building on the first and second floors of the west wing were left unfinished when the building opened to allow for future expansion. Part was completed in 1941 to house Chinese painting and the remainder of the building was completed after World War II. In 1993 Michael Churchman wrote a history of The Nelson-Atkins Museum of Art, High Ideals and Aspirations.

=== Directors ===
==== Paul Gardner, 1933–1953 ====
The museum had four Directors before Julián Zugazagoitia's appointment in 2010; the first was Paul Gardner (1894–1972). A native of Massachusetts, Gardner graduated from MIT in 1917 with a degree in architecture. He served with distinction in WWI, after which he traveled in Europe and North Africa for a year. In about 1919 he became a dancer with Anna Pavlova's Ballet Company under the name Paul Tchernikoff. Gardner eventually went back to graduate school, earning a master's in European history from George Washington University in 1928 and then enrolling in the doctoral program in art history at Harvard. In March 1932 the cautious Trustees of the Nelson Art Gallery, hesitant about naming a full-fledged Director, appointed the graduate student as their assistant on a trial basis. Gardner took to the new position at once, and so was named by the Trustees as Director eighteen months later, on September 1, 1933. He would serve for the next twenty years.

Gardner served in the US Army during the Italian campaign of World War II in the rank of major. He was appointed head of the Fine Arts and Education Department of the Allied Military Government in occupied Italy.

==== Ethylene Jackson, 1942–1945 ====
Ethylene Jackson (1907–1993), Paul Gardner's executive secretary since 1933, became acting director in November 1942 when Gardner was commissioned a major in the United States Army. Besides her role as executive secretary to the Director, Jackson had served as curator of the decorative arts collection. Paul Gardner served as a Monuments Man in Europe, returning to the Nelson in December 1945. Ethylene Jackson left Kansas City for New York City the following year after marrying art dealer Germain Seligman.

==== Laurence Sickman, 1953–1977 ====
Upon Paul Gardner's retirement on May 1, 1953, Laurence Sickman (1907–1988) became the Gallery's second Director. He had been associated with the Gallery since 1931.

Laurence Sickman, a native of Denver, Colorado, had become interested in Japanese and Chinese art as a high school student. After two years at the University of Colorado he transferred to Harvard, where he studied with Langdon Warner. He also became fluent in Chinese. After graduating with a B.A. in 1930 Sickman traveled to China on a Harvard-Yenching scholarship. There he reconnected with Warner, who was by then in China, under assignment to buy art for the museum Trustees. Warner recommended to the Trustees that the young graduate student assume the responsibility of negotiating art purchases for the Gallery, as Warner was moving to Japan. Sickman's acumen as a collector earned him the respect of the Trustees, who sent him thousands of dollars with which to buy art. Since he was on a scholarship, his expertise cost the Trustees nothing. He made the 6,000-mile journey to Kansas City in December 1933 for the opening of the Gallery, then returned to China. Returning once more to the United States, he was made the Gallery's Curator of Oriental Art in 1935. By 1941, Sickman's purchases of Chinese art had given the Nelson Gallery one of the best Asian collections in the United States.

Sickman, like Paul Gardner, was commissioned as an officer in the United States Army as a member of the Monuments Men, serving from 1942 to 1945 in England, India, and China. In his absence, his very capable assistant, Miss Lindsay Hughes, was appointed acting Curator. Sickman returned to his curatorial role after the war; eight years later he was named Director. Among the many successes of his tenure, the most important was the major exhibition "Archaeological Finds of the People's Republic of China", which ran from April 20-June 8, 1975 and attracted about 280,000 visitors. The exhibition of 385 pieces was a result of the détente between the United States and Communist China that Richard Nixon's 1972 trip to that country had begun. This was a professional and personal coup for Sickman: his reputation as a scholar and the collection he had built at the Nelson Gallery made Kansas City one of only four cities the exhibition would visit, after Paris, Toronto, and Washington, D.C. Laurence Sickman retired on January 31, 1977, and was named Director Emeritus and advisor to the Trustees.

==== Ted Coe, 1977–1982 ====
On Laurence Sickman's retirement, Ralph Tracy "Ted" Coe (1929–2010) became the Gallery's third Director. Coe was a native of Cleveland, where his father, a steel manufacturer, was an art collector. The recipient of a bachelor's degree in art history from Oberlin College and a master's in architecture from Yale, he had worked at the Victoria and Albert Museum in London and the National Gallery in Washington, D.C. before coming to the Nelson Gallery in 1959 as Curator of Painting and Sculpture. While a curator, Coe organized several large and well-attended special exhibitions. The most influential was "Sacred Circles", an exhibition of 900 Native American art objects. Organized to commemorate the American Bicentennial, the show opened at the Hayward Gallery in London, England, running from October 1976 to January 1977. Financial support was quickly organized in Kansas City to make the Nelson Gallery the only American venue. "Sacred Circles" was the second most popular exhibition after the Chinese show of 1975, running from April 16-June 19, 1977, and drawing more than 245,000 visitors. Ted Coe requested a sabbatical from his duties as Director in March 1982 and resigned at the end of June, having worked at the Nelson for 23 years, including 4 1/2 years as Director.

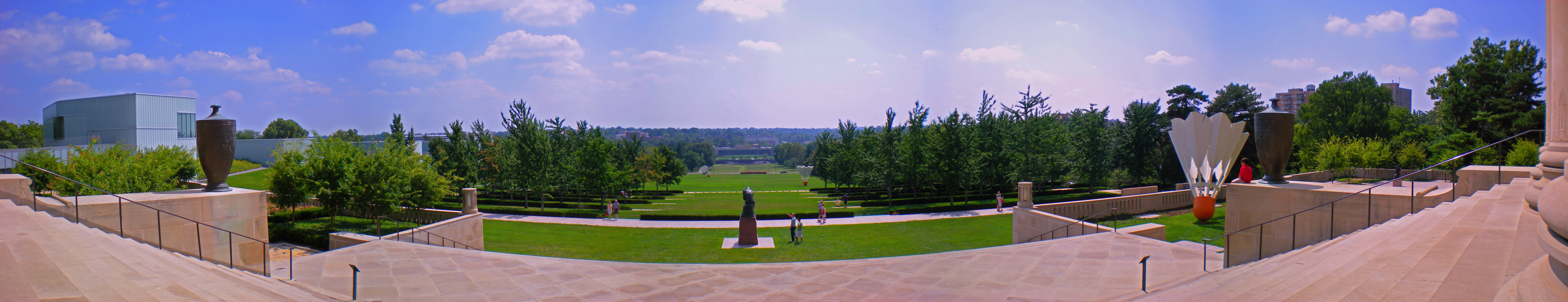
Panoramic view of the lawn in front of the Nelson Atkins Museum of Art, Summer 2008

==== Marc Wilson, 1982–2010 ====
Ted Coe was succeeded by Marc Wilson, who served from 1982 to 2010.

==== Julián Zugazagoitia, 2010– ====
On September 1, 2010, Julián Zugazagoitia (b. 1964) became the museum's fifth Director. Zugazagoita native of Mexico City, Mexco Zugazagoitia had previously served for seven years as the Director and CEO of El Museo del Barrio in New York City.

=== Bloch Building addition ===
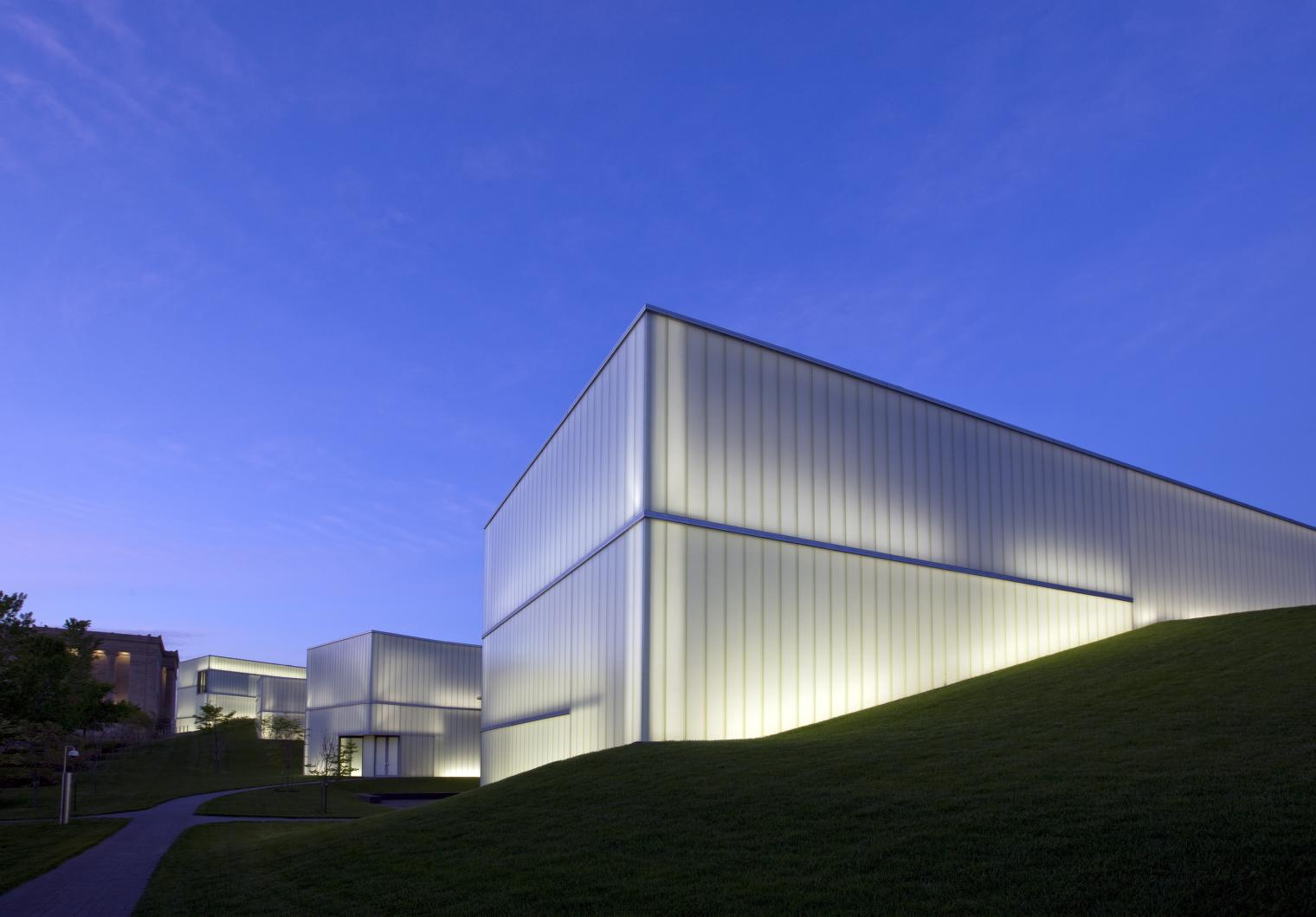
The Bloch Building seen in 2009.

The Thinker, by Auguste Rodin, marked the north entrance prior to the addition of the Bloch Building when it was moved to the south side.

In 1993, the museum began to consider the first expansion plans since the completion of the unfinished areas in the 1940s. Plans called for a 55 percent increase in space and were finalized in 1999.

Architect Steven Holl won an international competition in 1999 for the design of the addition. Holl's concept, conceived and realized with Design Partner Chris McVoy, was to build five glass pavilions to the east of the original building which they call lenses. The lenses top a 165,000-square-foot (15,300 m^{2}) underground building known as the Bloch Building. It is named after the H&R Block co-founder Henry W. Bloch. The Bloch building houses the museum's contemporary, African, photography, and special exhibitions galleries as well a new cafe, the museum's Spencer Art Reference Library, and the Isamu Noguchi Sculpture Court. The addition cost approximately $95 million and opened June 9, 2007. It was part of $200 million in renovations to the museum that included the Ford Learning Center which is home to classes, workshops, and resources for students and educators. It opened in fall of 2005.

In the competition to design the addition, all the entrants except Holl proposed creating a modern addition on the north side of the museum which would have drastically altered or obscured the north facade which served as the main entrance to the museum. Instead Holl and McVoy proposed placing the addition on the east side perpendicular to the main building. Their aim was to engage the museum's iconic sculpture garden to fuse the experience of art, architecture and landscape. Their lenses now cascade down the east perimeter of the grounds.

During construction, Holl's plan met with considerable controversy. It was described as "grotesque, a metal box". However, reviews of the new structure once completed have generally been raves:

New York Times architecture critic Nicolai Ouroussoff gives this description:

For the art world, the addition, known as the Bloch Building, should reaffirm that art and architecture can happily coexist. The rest of us can draw comfort from the fact that public works of our own day and age can equal or surpass the grand achievements of past generations ...

The result is a building that doesn't challenge the past so much as suggest an alternate world view that is in constant shift. Seen from the north plaza, the addition's main entrance gently defers to the old building, the crystalline form suggesting a ghostlike echo of the austere stone facade. From there, the eye is drawn to the distinct yet interconnected translucent blocks, which are partly buried in the landscape ...

It's an approach that should be studied by anyone who sets out to design a museum from this point forward.

The museum has gone against traditional conservatorial thinking in allowing natural light from the lenses to illuminate its art work. Most of the exhibits in the addition are below ground with the 27 to 34-foot (10 m) glass pavilions above them. Officials say that advances in glass technology have allowed them to block most of the harmful ultraviolet rays that could damage the exhibited works.

The custom glass planks were manufactured by Glasfabrik Lamberts and imported by Bendheim Wall Systems.

Admission to the museum is free every day and visitors may use any of seven entrances to access the building. The main visitor's desk is in the Bloch Building. On the north side of the museum, a reflecting pool now occupies part of the J.C. Nichols Plaza on the north facade and contains 34 oculi to provide natural light into the parking garage below. The casting of Auguste Rodin's The Thinker which occupied this space prior to the renovations has been relocated to south of the museum.

In 2013, the combination of Steven Holl Architects and BNIM was selected to build a $100 million addition to the John F. Kennedy Center for the Performing Arts to be modeled somewhat on the Bloch Addition.

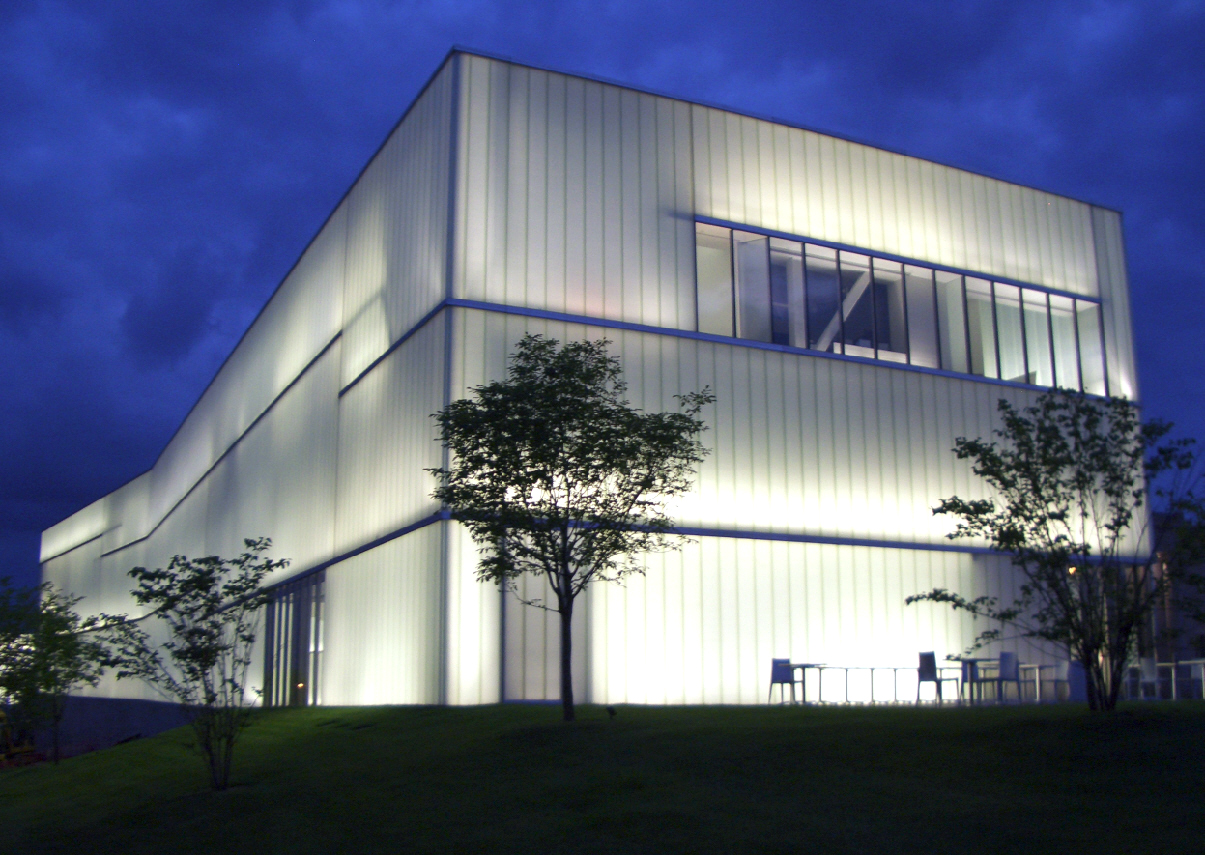

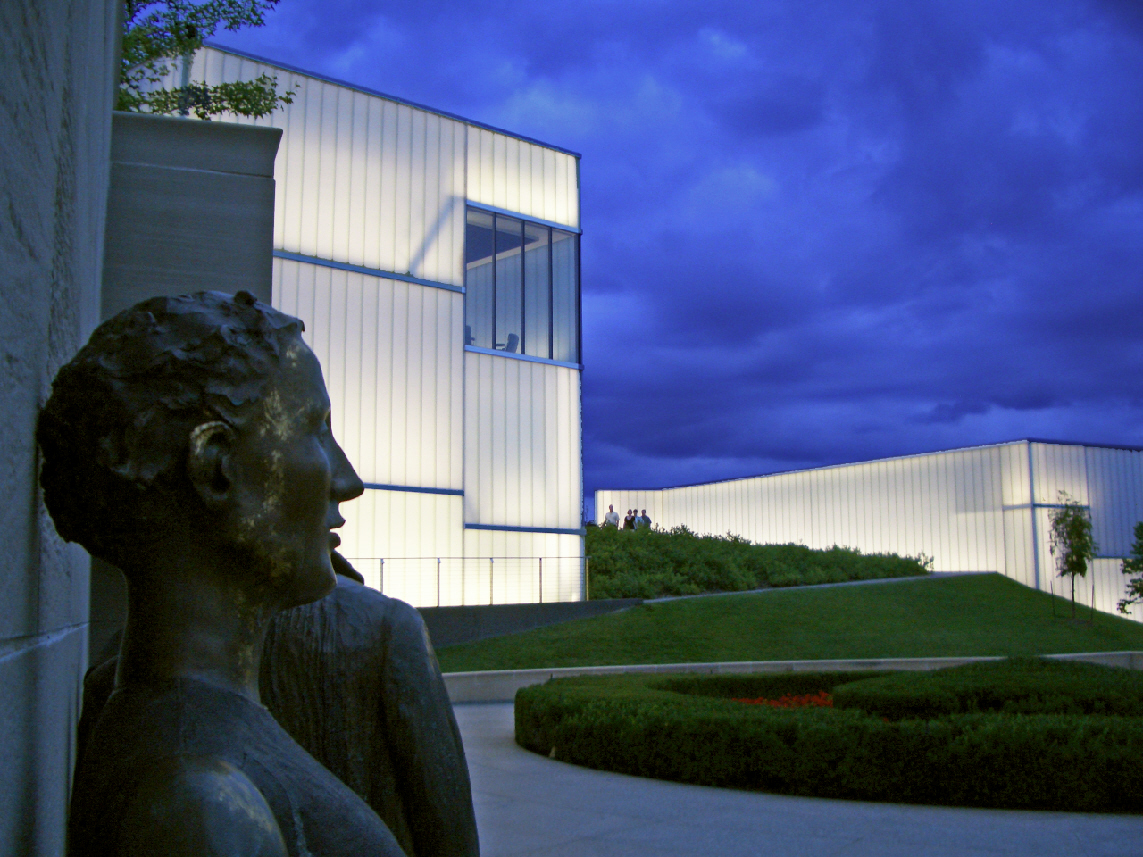

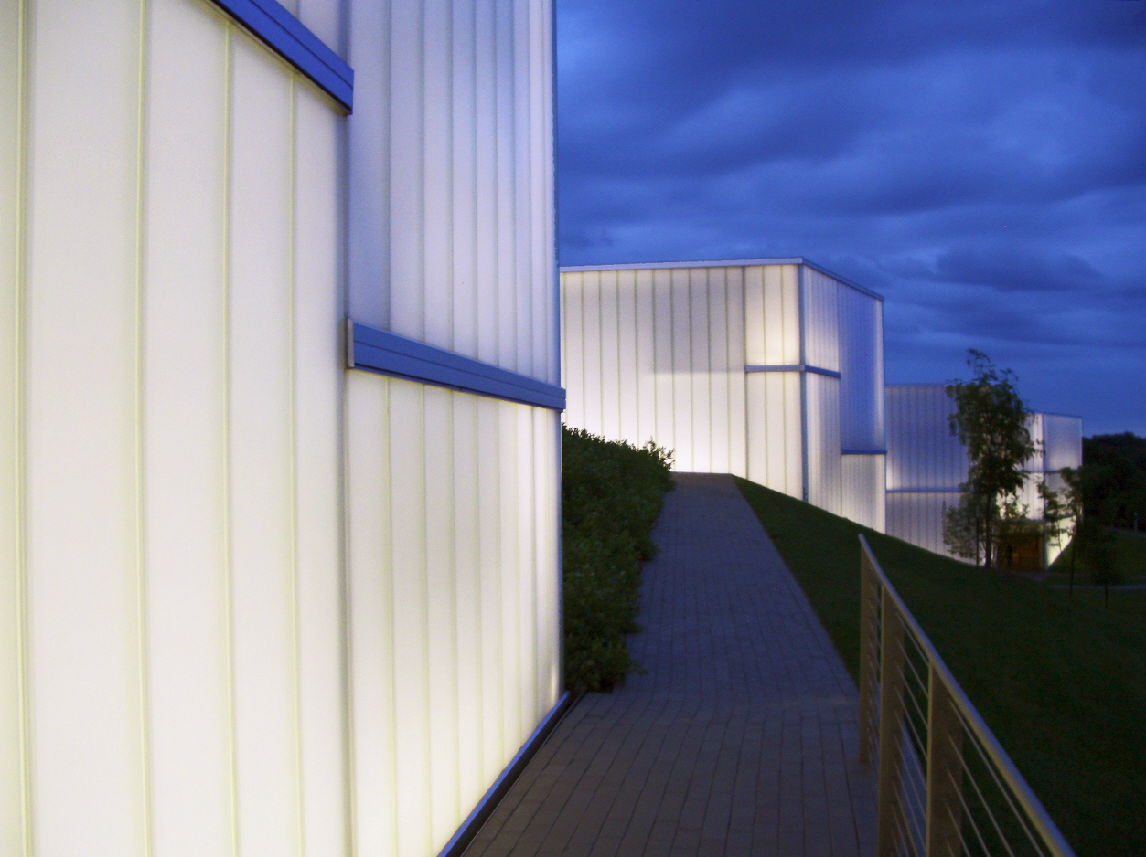

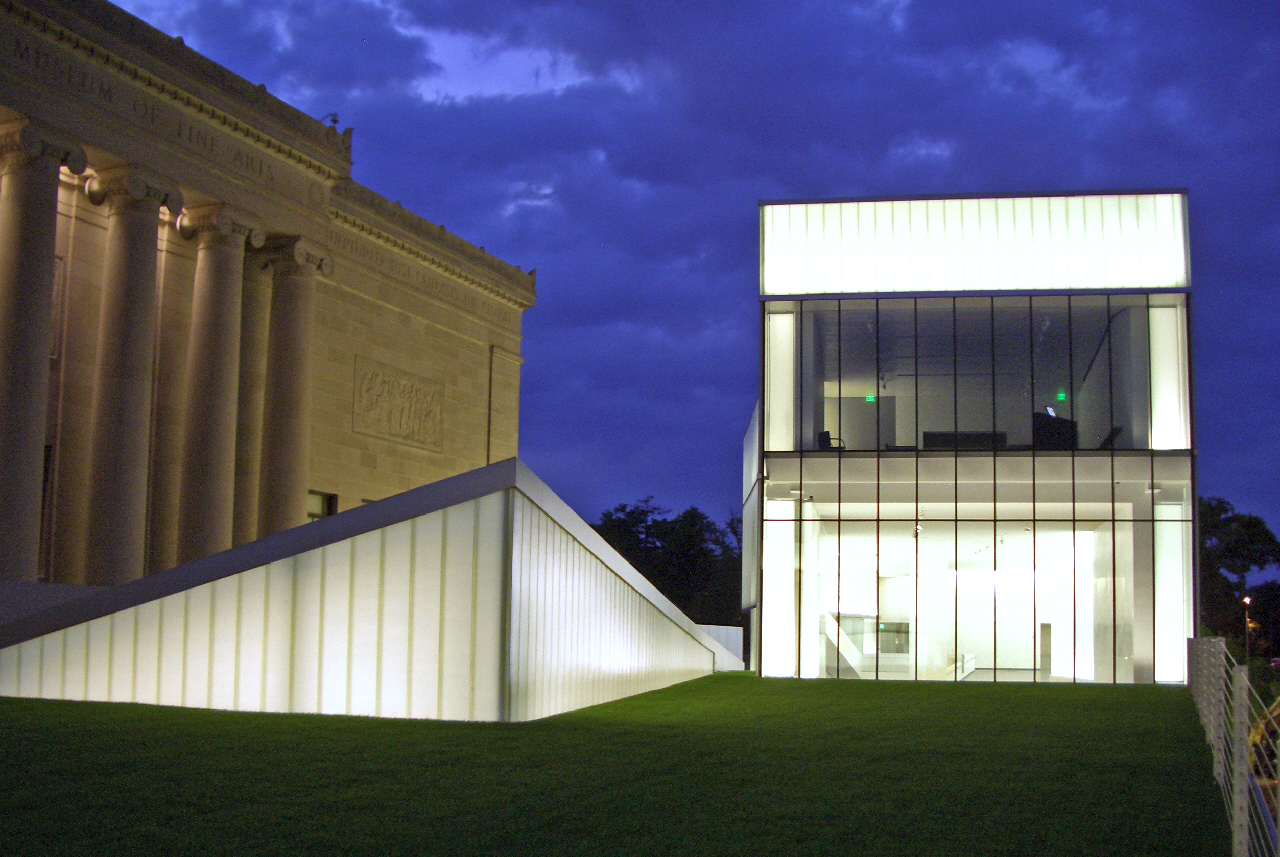

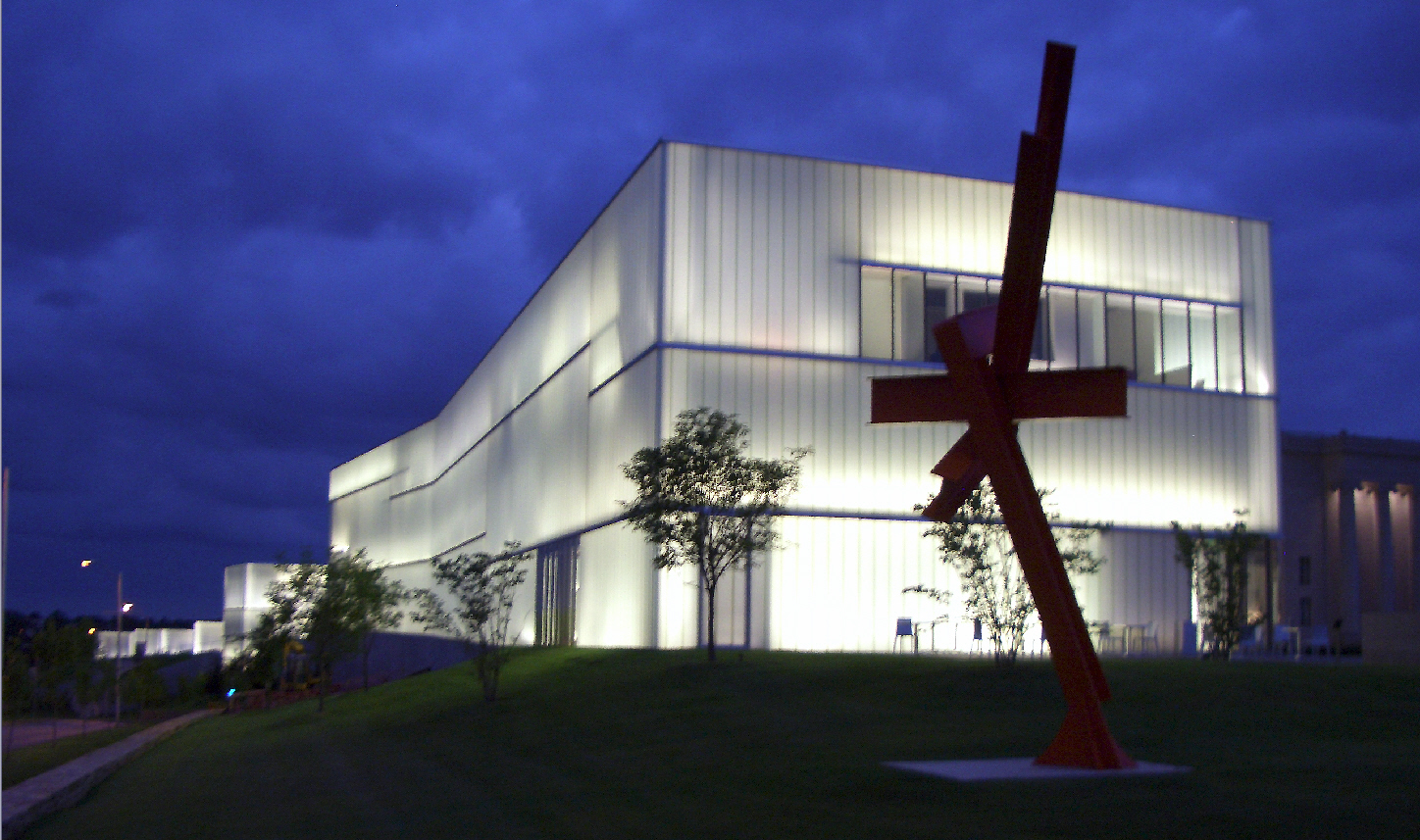

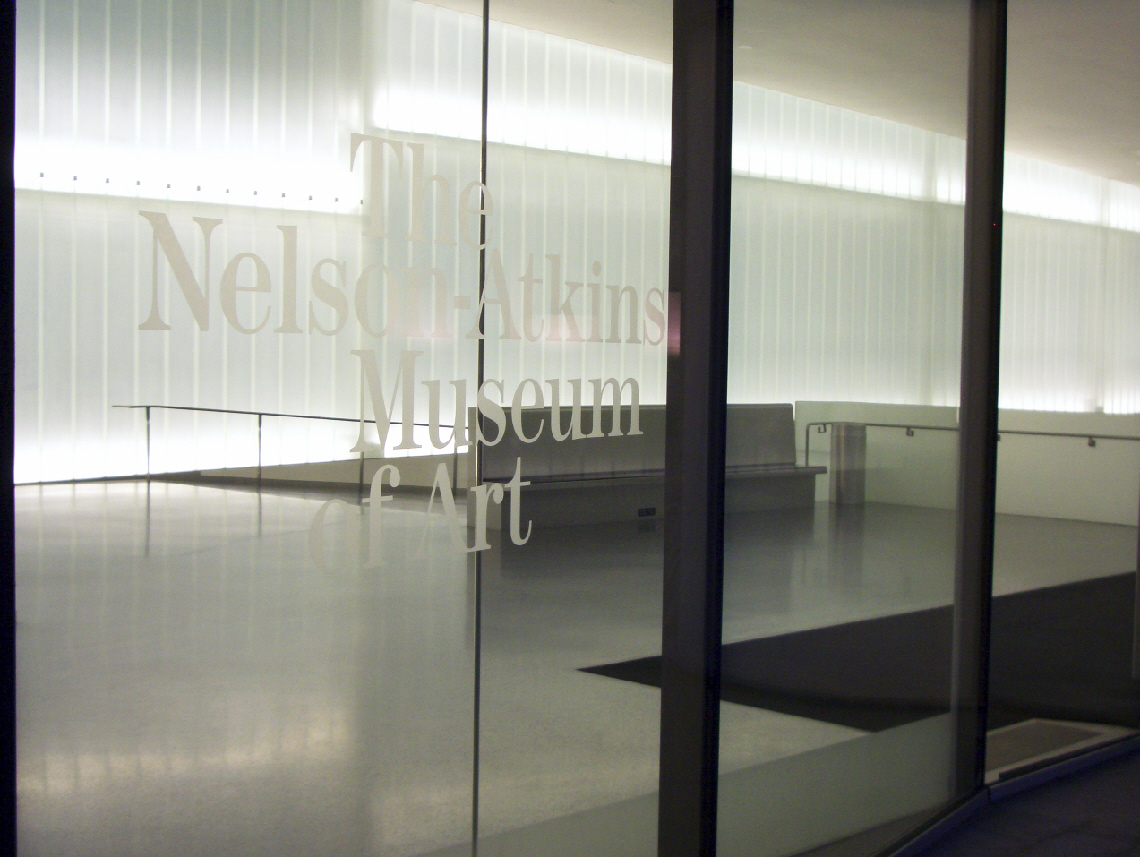

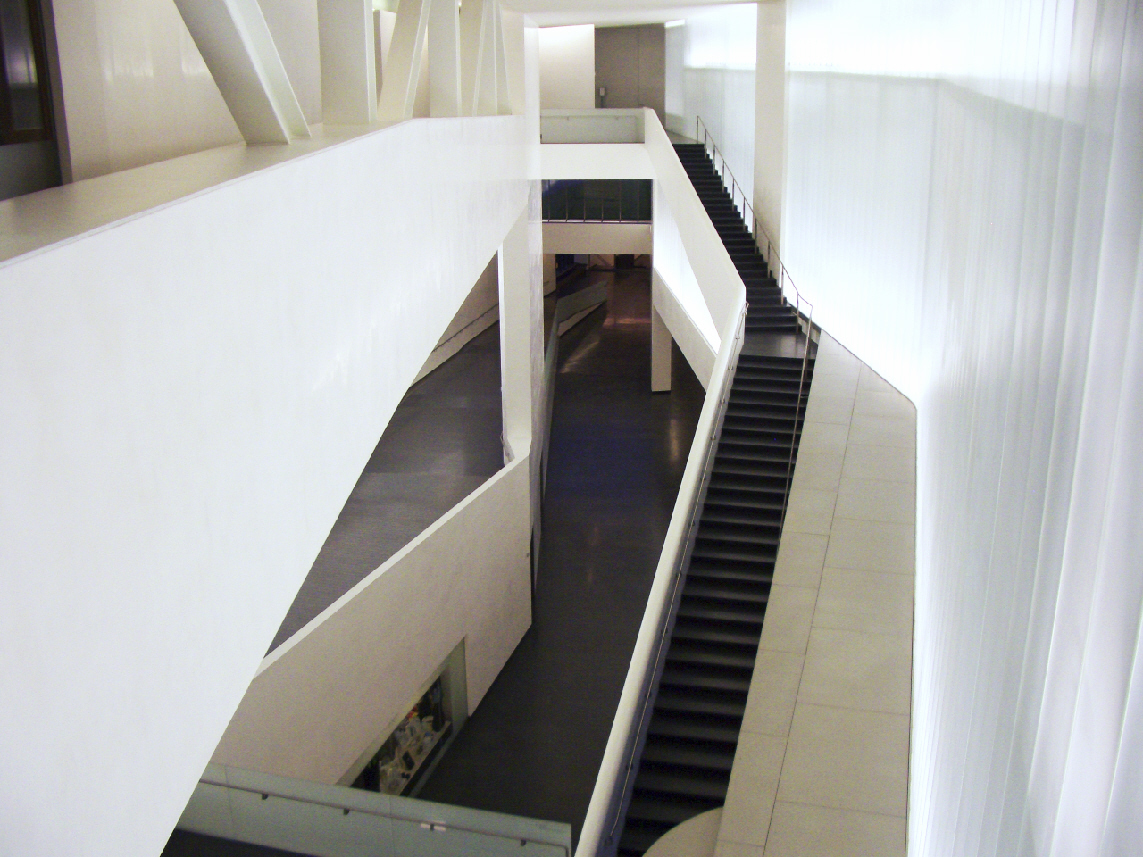

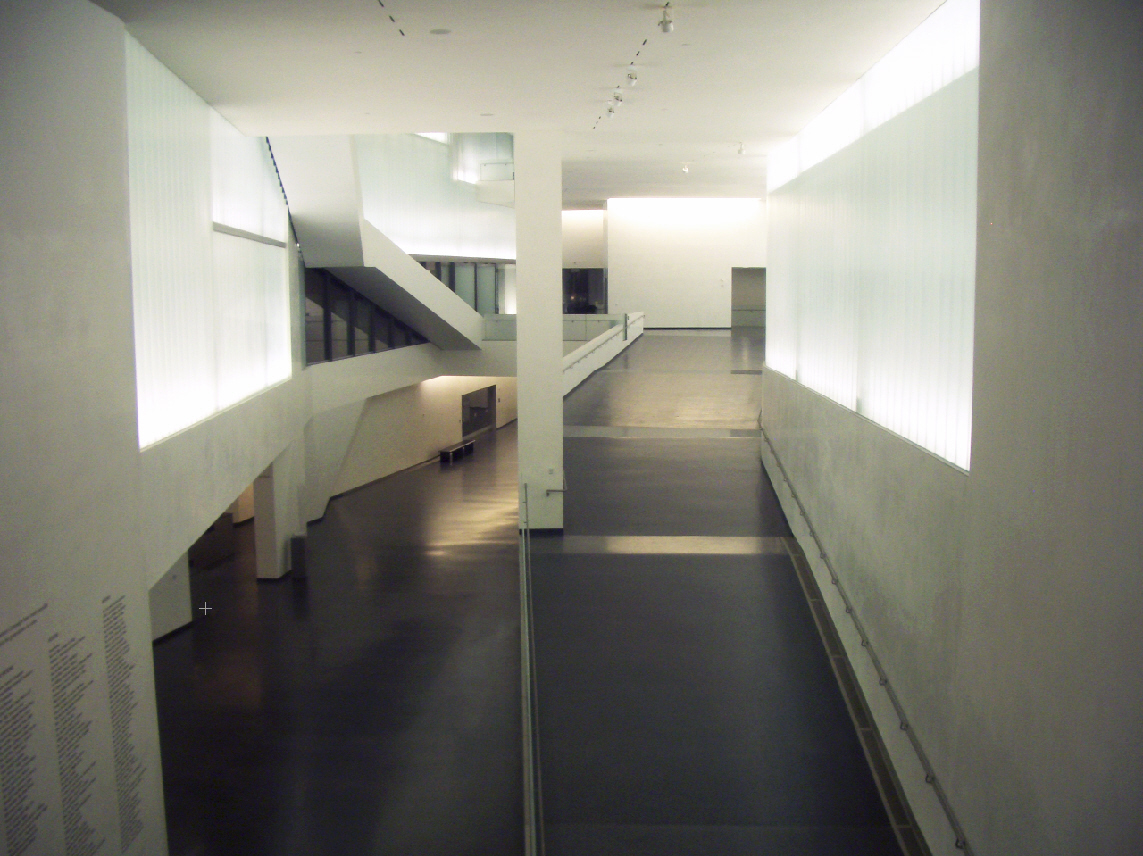

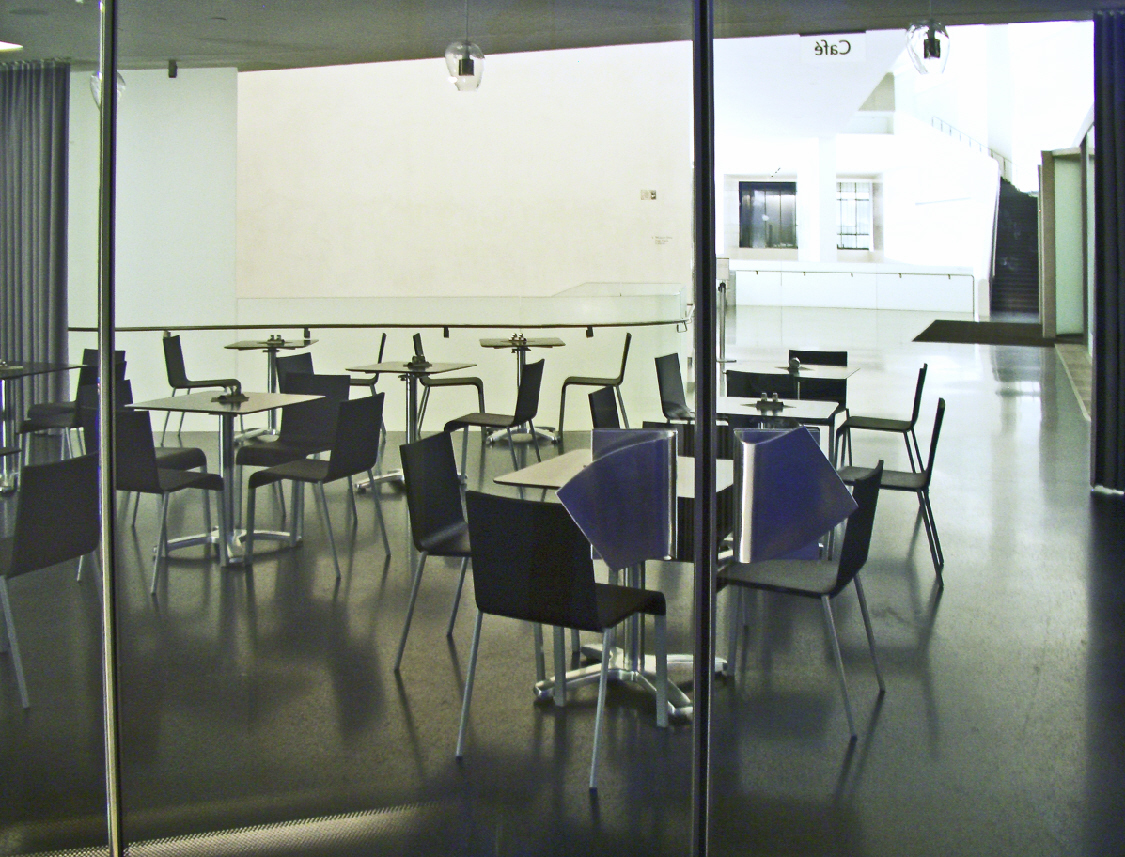

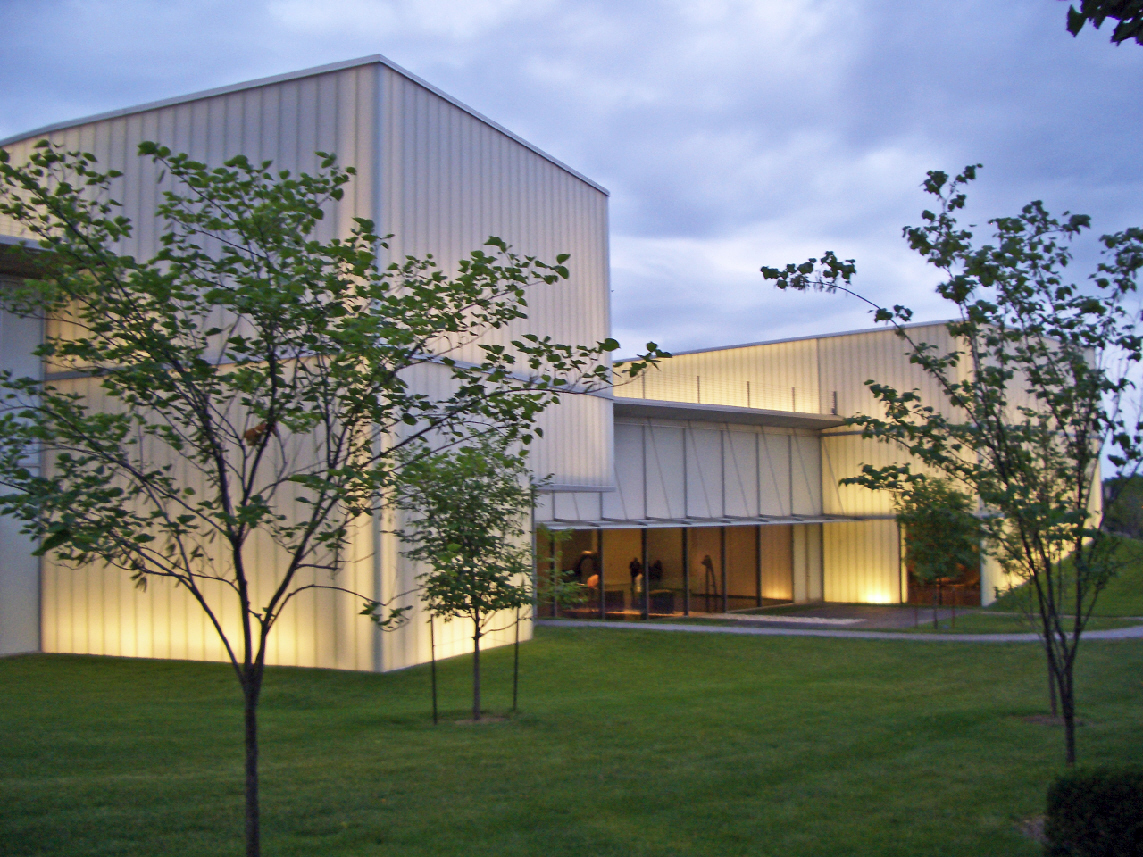

== Collections ==
=== Ancient ===
With works from the ancient world, this includes locations such as: Egypt, Greece, Rome, and Near Eastern. The gallery opened in 2010, led by Robert Cohon as curator. Portraits of pharaohs and Egyptian queens like Sen-useret III, Ramses II, Nefert-iti, the Ptolemy Dynasty are the most notable in the Egyptian collection. Near Eastern works includes jewelry from the early of kings and queens at Ur and sculptures from the 1st-millennium B.C.E. Palace of Ashurnasirpal II in Nimrud and the ceremonial center of the Persian Empire, Persepolis. Greek works are mostly statues and pottery from the 5th to 1st century B.C.E. of the Greek deities and heroes like Helios, Apollo, Demeter, Achilles, and Heracles. Roman statues of the emperors Alexander Severus and Hadrian, with other Roman works from early Christian period (4th to 7th century A.D) among them is a limestone sculpture of Thecla, the first female catholic martyr.

During the height of the COVID-19 pandemic, the museum made a virtual tour of their Queen Nefertari gallery with Julián Zugazagoitia acting as tour guide. The video was organized by the Nelson-Atkins, Pointe-à-Callière, and National Geographic Society. The exhibit is on Nefertari, called "The One For Whom The Sun Shines" by her husband Pharaoh Ramesses II, with 230 pieces of art on Nefertari and other woman of ancient Egypt. "It will be thrilling to have these ancient works of art in our midst, to imagine the hands that created them and the importance these objects played in Egyptian culture. What a privilege to welcome objects from one of the most significant archaeological sites in Egypt – the Valley of the Queens," said Julián Zugazagoitia

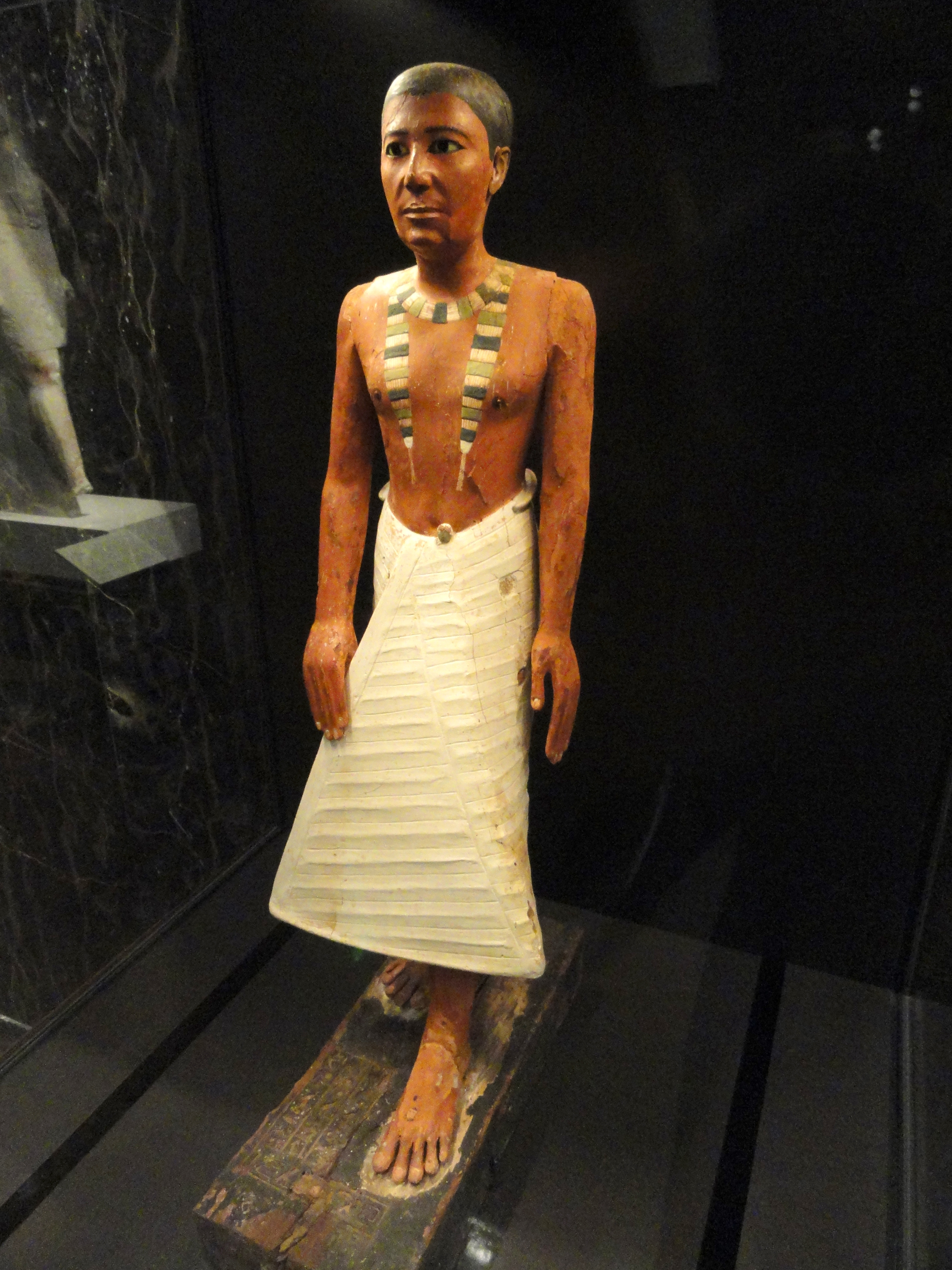
Metjetji statue, Saqqara, Old Kingdom

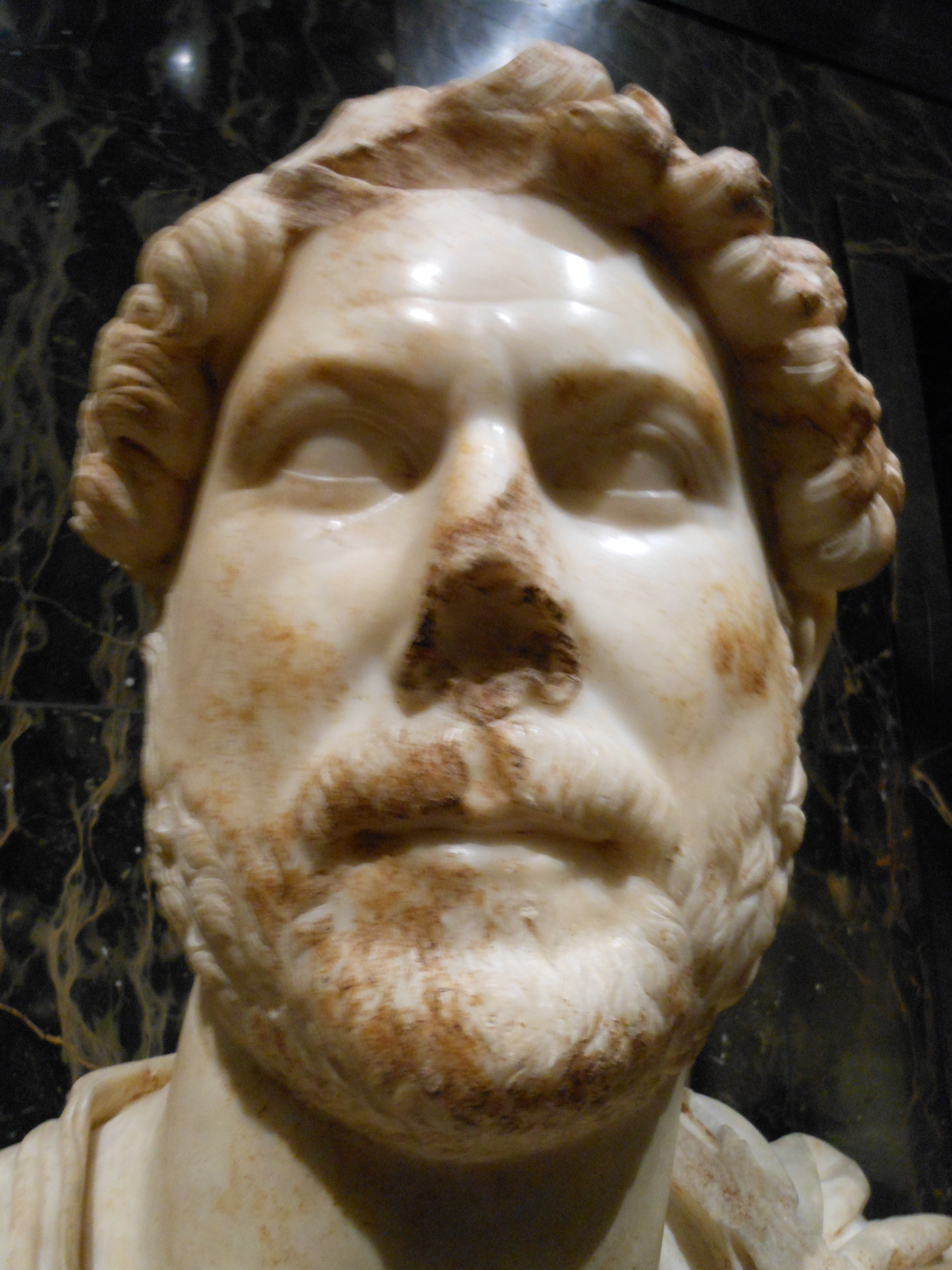
Statue of Hadrian

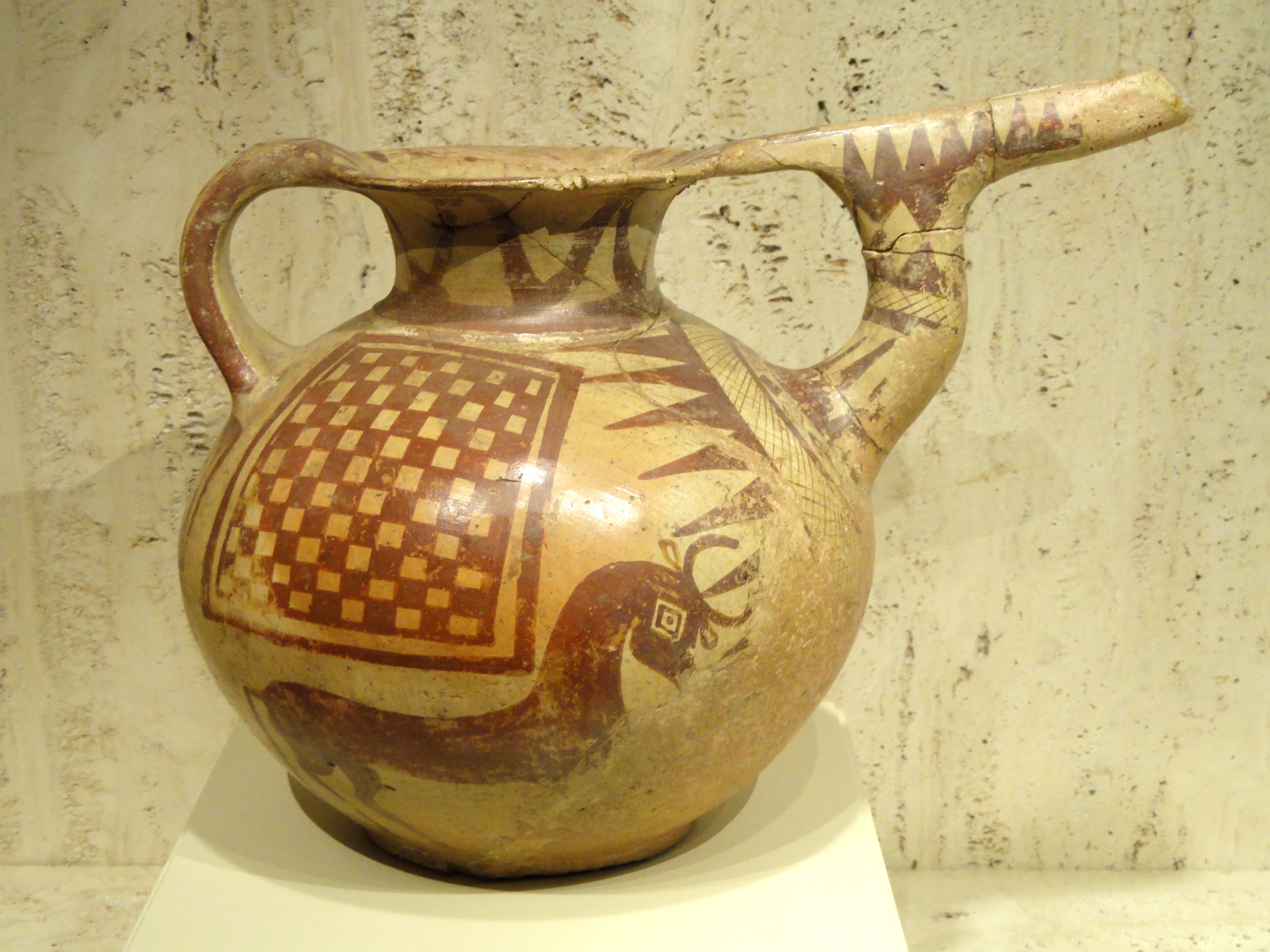
Vase, from Tepe Sialk (Iran), 1000 BCE

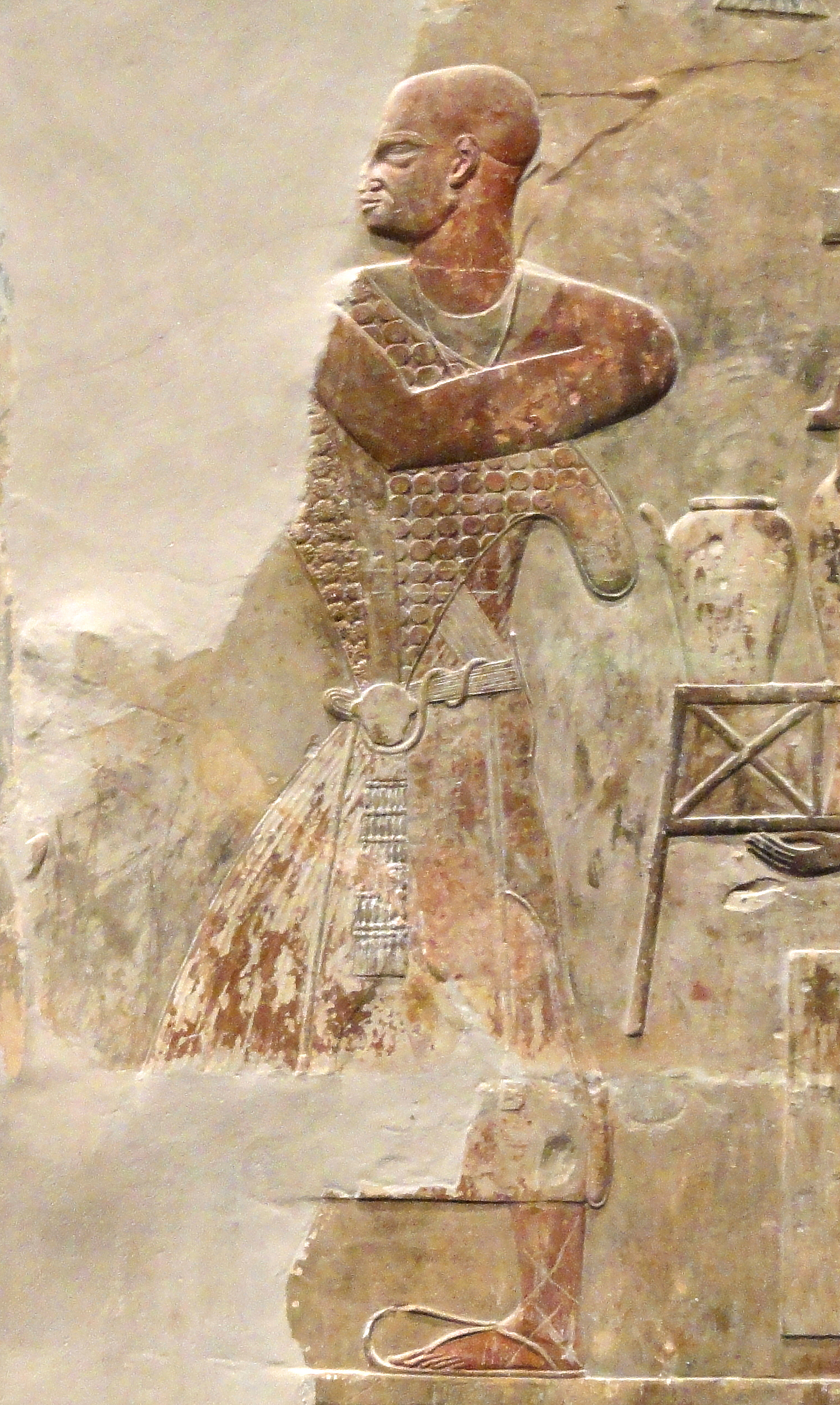
Portrait of Mentuemhat, Thebes, 665-650 BCE

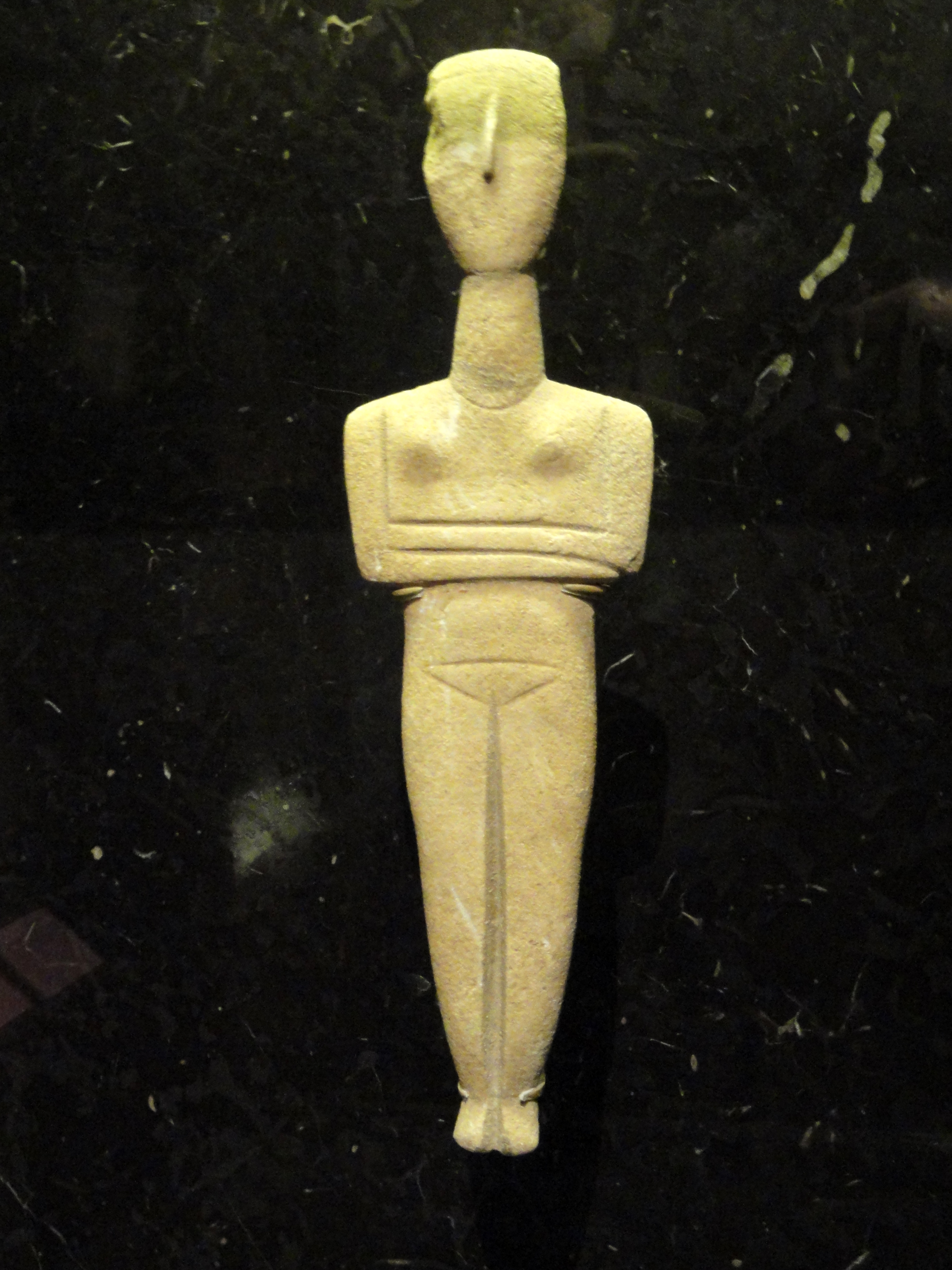
Cycladic Idol, from Cyclades Greece, 3000 BCE

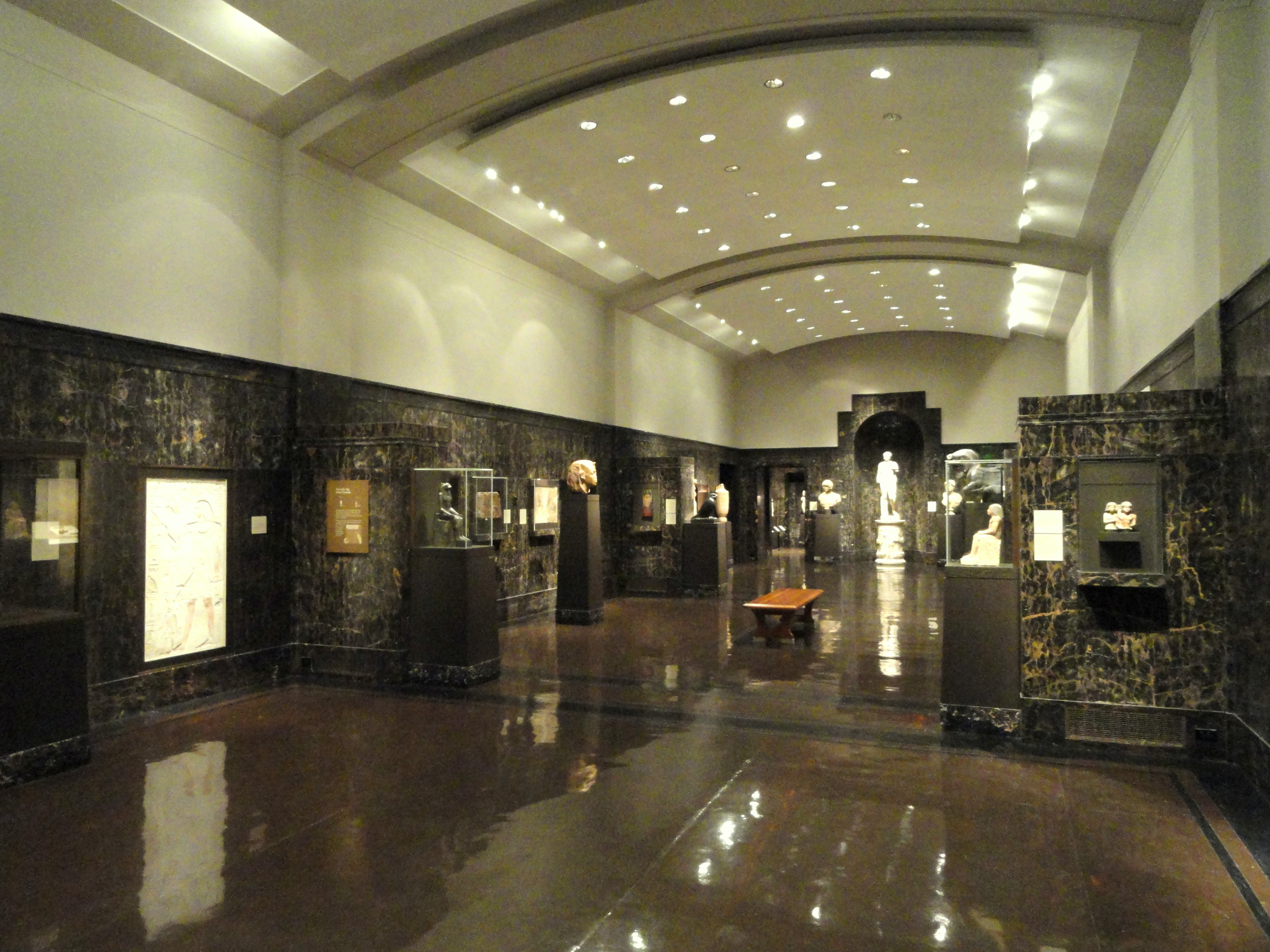
Classical/Ancient Art Collection Hall

=== European ===
The museum's European painting collection is highly prized. It includes works by Caravaggio, Jusepe de Ribera, Jean-Baptiste-Siméon Chardin, Petrus Christus, Gustave Courbet, El Greco, Giambattista Pittoni, Guercino, Alessandro Magnasco, Giuseppe Bazzani, Corrado Giaquinto, Cavaliere d'Arpino, Gaspare Traversi, Giuliano Bugiardini, Titian, Hieronymus Bosch, Rembrandt, Louise Élisabeth Vigée Le Brun, Peter Paul Rubens, Eugène Fromentin, Gustave Caillebotte, Edgar Degas, Paul Gauguin, Claude Monet, Camille Pissarro, and Vincent van Gogh.

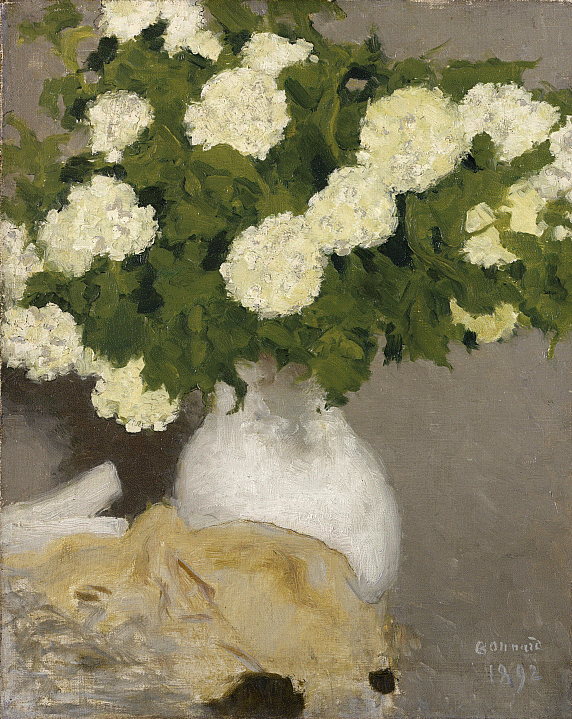
Les Boules de Neige by Pierre Bonnard

In early 2016, The Temptation of St. Anthony, a small panel long attributed to the workshop of Hieronymus Bosch, was credited to the painter himself after forensic investigation of its underpainting. It was added to the ranks of only 25 authenticated Bosch paintings in the world. The Nelson-Atkins also has fine Late Gothic and Early Italian Renaissance paintings by Jacopo del Casentino (The Presentation of Christ in the Temple), Giovanni di Paolo and Workshop, Bernardo Daddi and Workshop, Lorenzo Monaco, Gherardo Starnina (The Adoration of the Magi), and Lorenzo di Credi. It has German and Austrian Expressionist paintings by Max Beckmann, Karl Hofer (Record Player), Emil Nolde, Ernst Ludwig Kirchner and Oskar Kokoschka (Pyramids of Egypt).

Nelson Atkins has worked with Nazi-era art pieces that are often made by Jewish, Romani, queer, or otherwise against the Nazi ideal in the 1920-40s though mostly focuses on art made and owned by Jewish people. Many pieces were either destroyed, rescued, or sold for cheap. They work on researching pieces and working with the descendants of the owners or artists. Depending on the descendants’ wishes, the pieces are either returned or allowed to stay on display. One of the most famous Nazi-era pieces is a still life, Les Boules de Neige, by Pierre Bonnard, which was held in the Altaussee salt mine and taken from the French banker David David-Weill. The museum has a list of their works held on their website and the American Alliance of Museums' Nazi-Era Provenance Internet Portal (NEPIP).

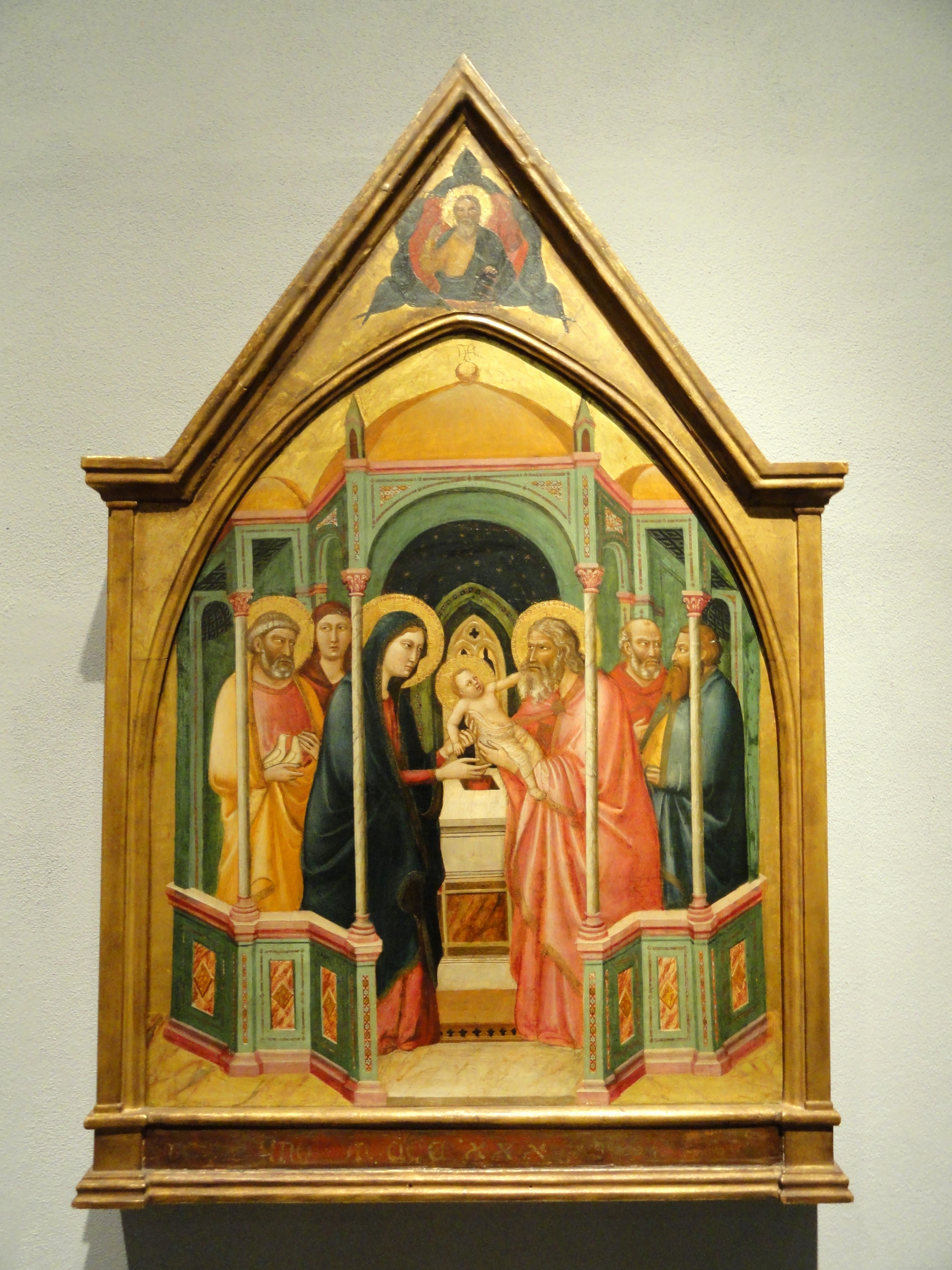
Jacopo del Casentino Presentation of the Christ Child in the Temple

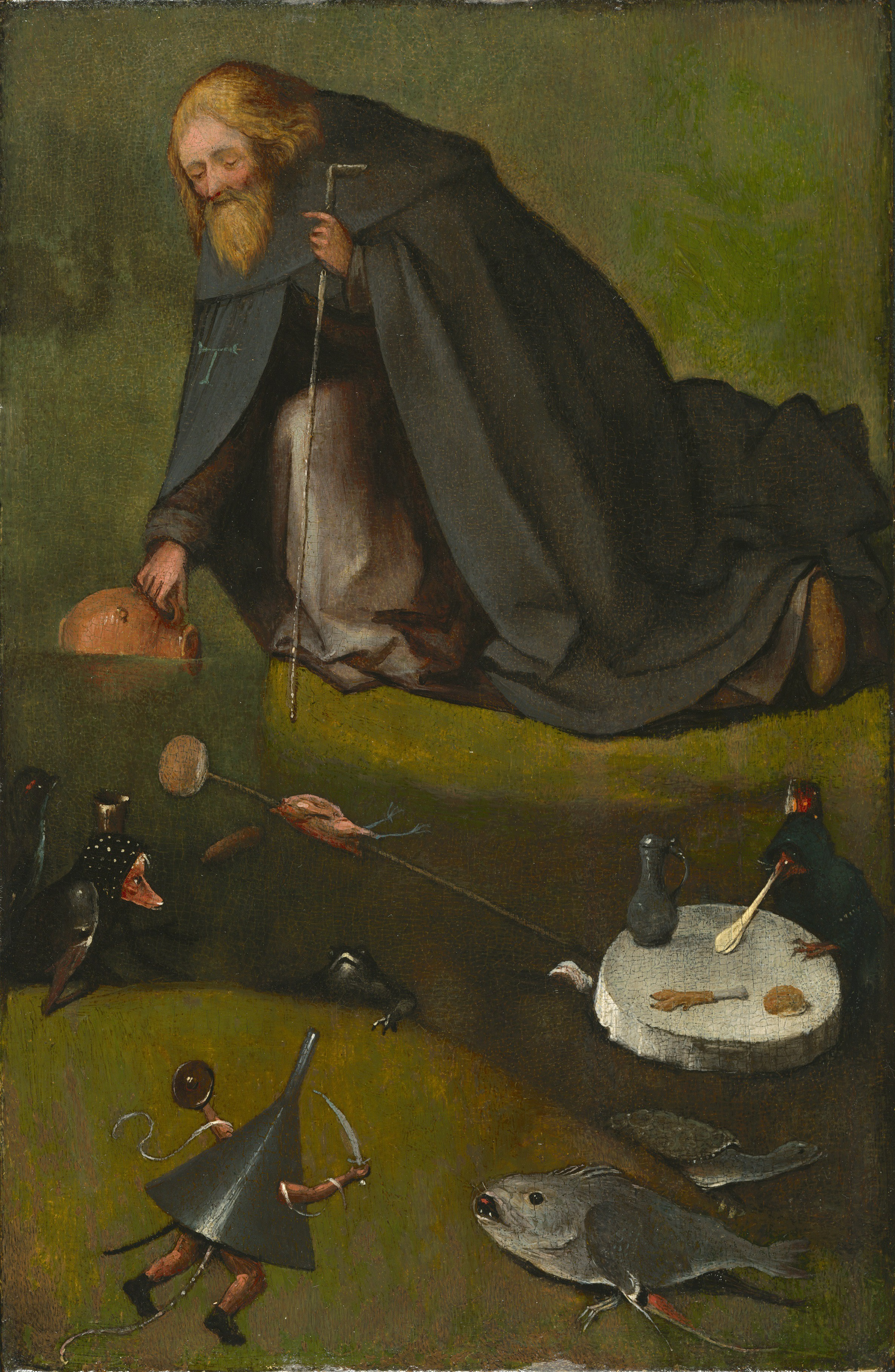
Hieronymus Bosch The Temptation of St. Anthony

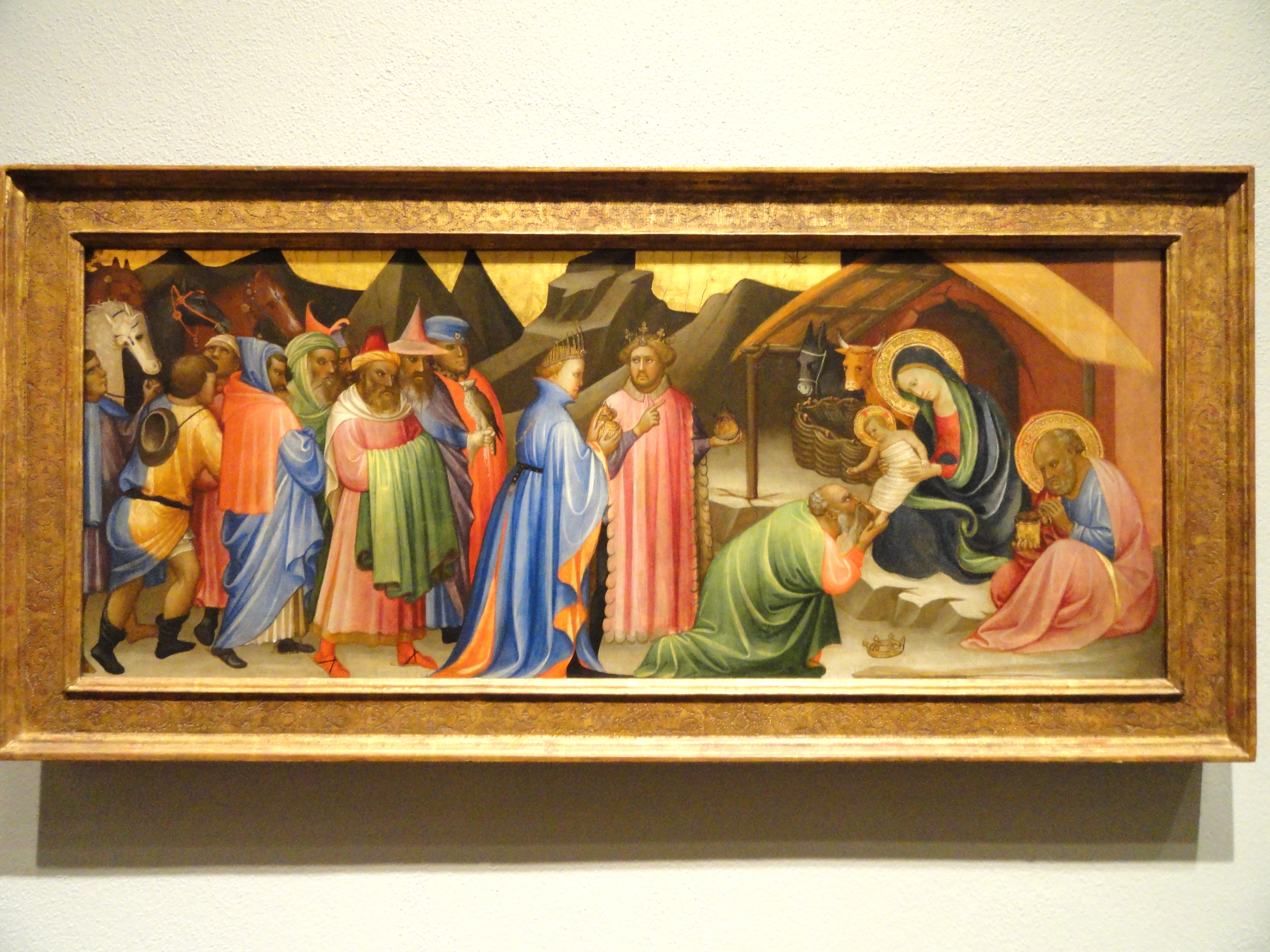
Gherardo Starnina The Adoration of the Magi

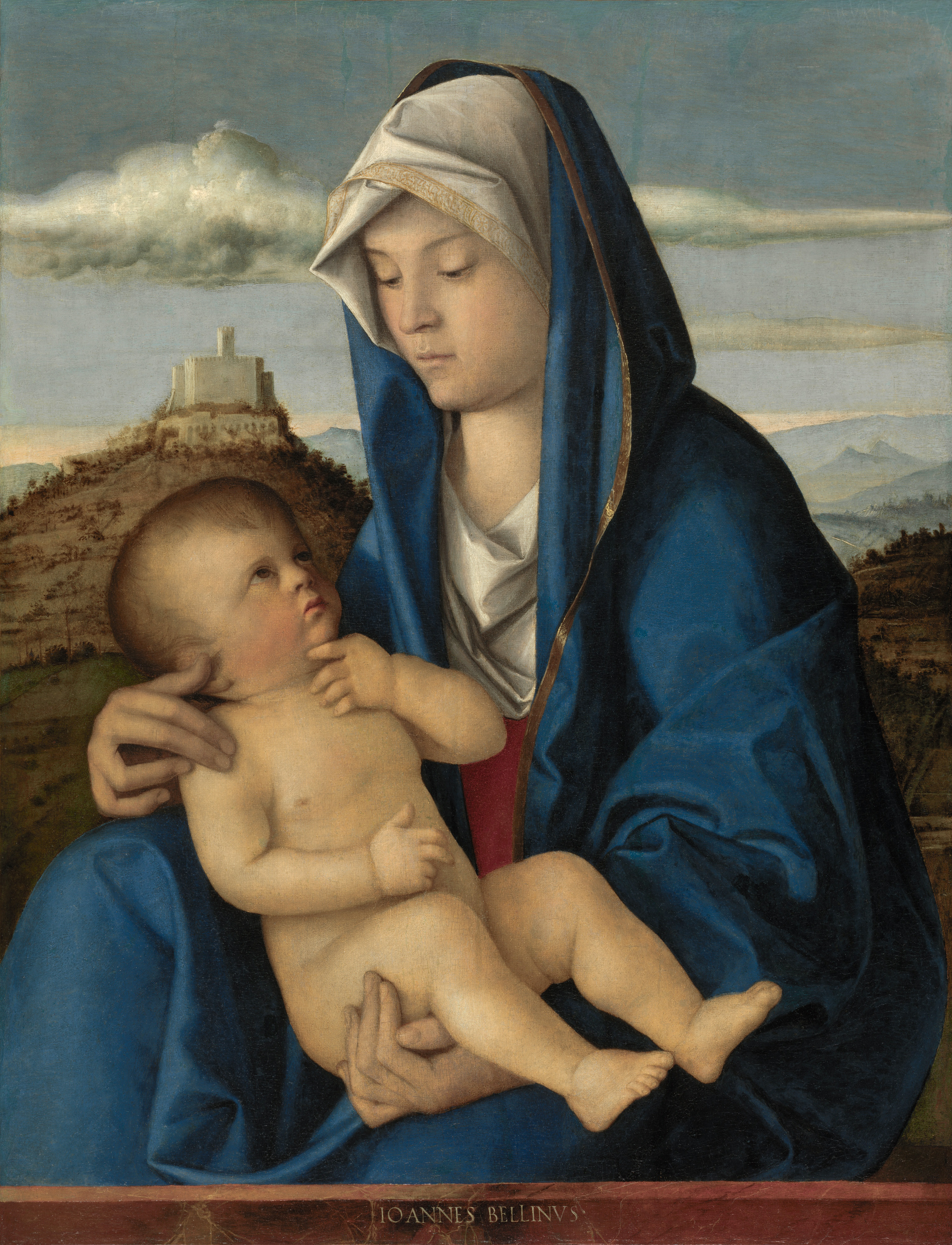
Giovanni Bellini Madonna and Child

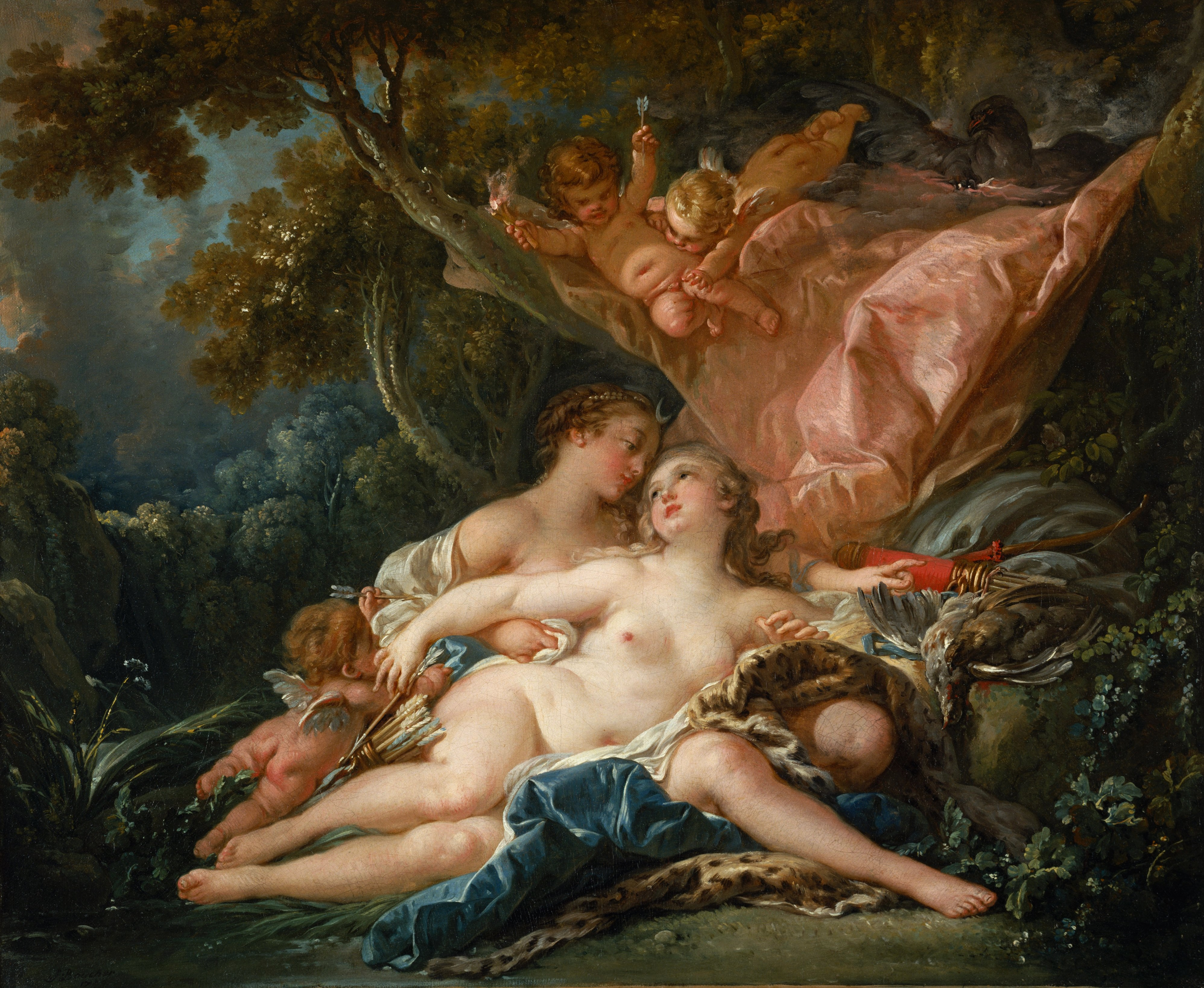
François Boucher - La Nymphe Callisto, séduite par Jupiter sous les traits de Diane (In English :The Nymph Callisto Seduced by Jupiter in the Guise of Diana)

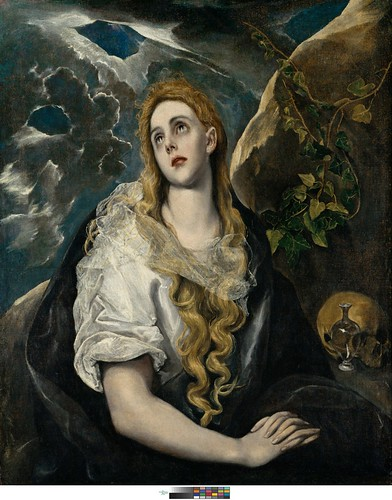
El Greco Penitent Magdalene a c.1580–1585 version

=== Asian ===
The museum is distinguished and widely celebrated for its extensive collection of Asian art, especially that of Imperial China, as well as pieces from Afghanistan, India, Iran, Indonesia, Korea, Pakistan, and other Southeast/ South Asia. Most of it was purchased for the museum in the early 20th century by Laurence Sickman, then a Harvard fellow in China. The museum has one of the best collections of Chinese antique furniture in the country, including one of the celebrated group of glazed pottery luohans from Yixian (c. 1000).

In addition to Chinese art, the collection includes pieces from Japan, including screen and scroll pieces by Kaihō Yūshō, Tawaraya Sōtatsu, Ikeno Taiga, and Shiokawa Bunrin. The collection of woodblock pieces numbers around 500 with works by Katsushika Hokusai and Utagawa Hiroshige in it. The collection also includes sculpture, ceramics, and textile works.

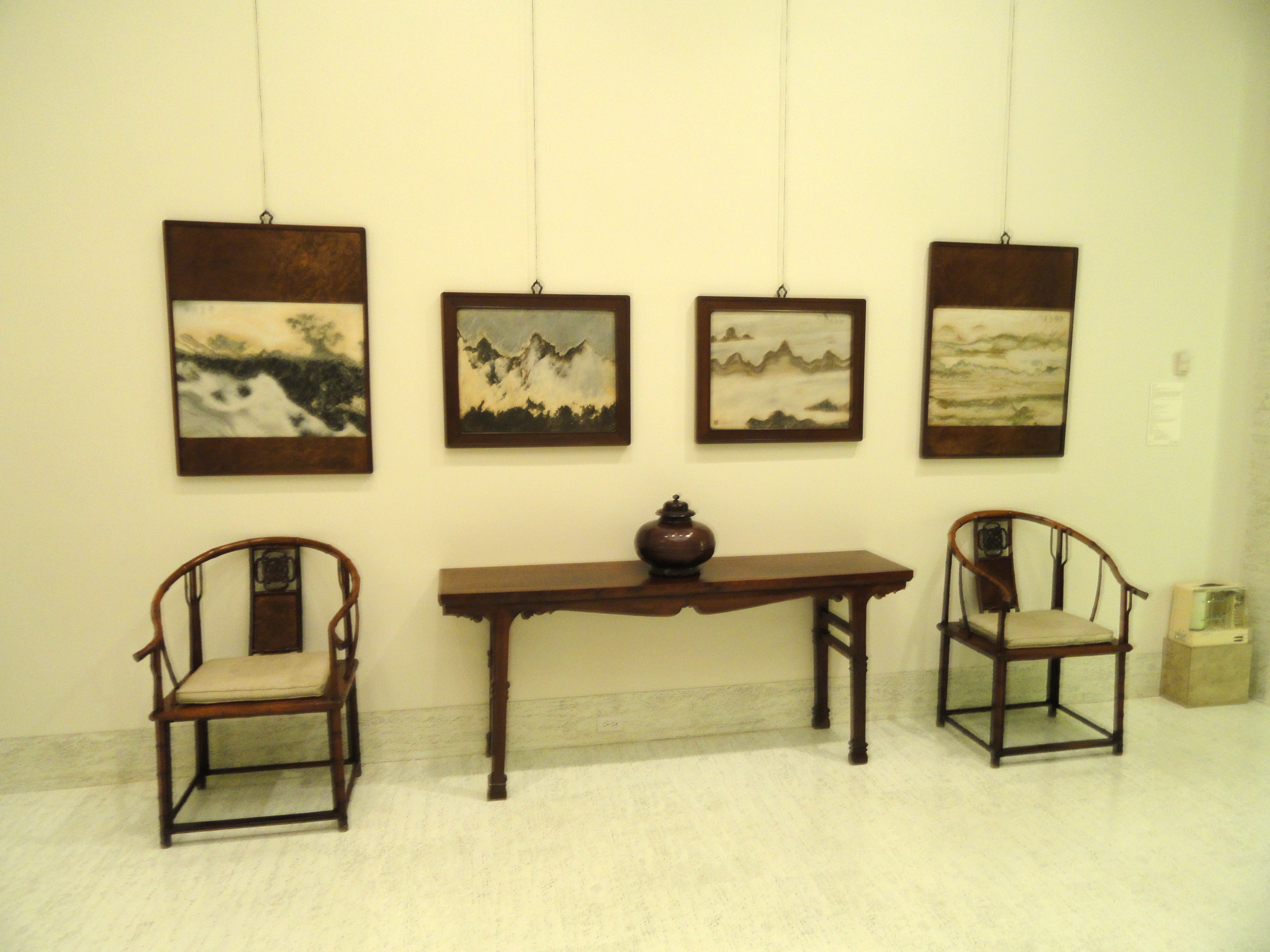
Huanghuali wood furniture, China

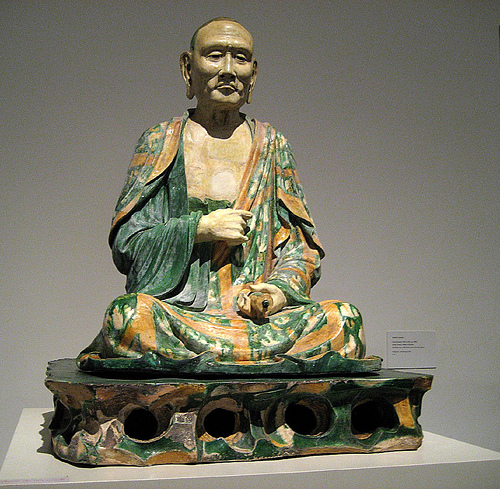
Yixian glazed pottery Luohans

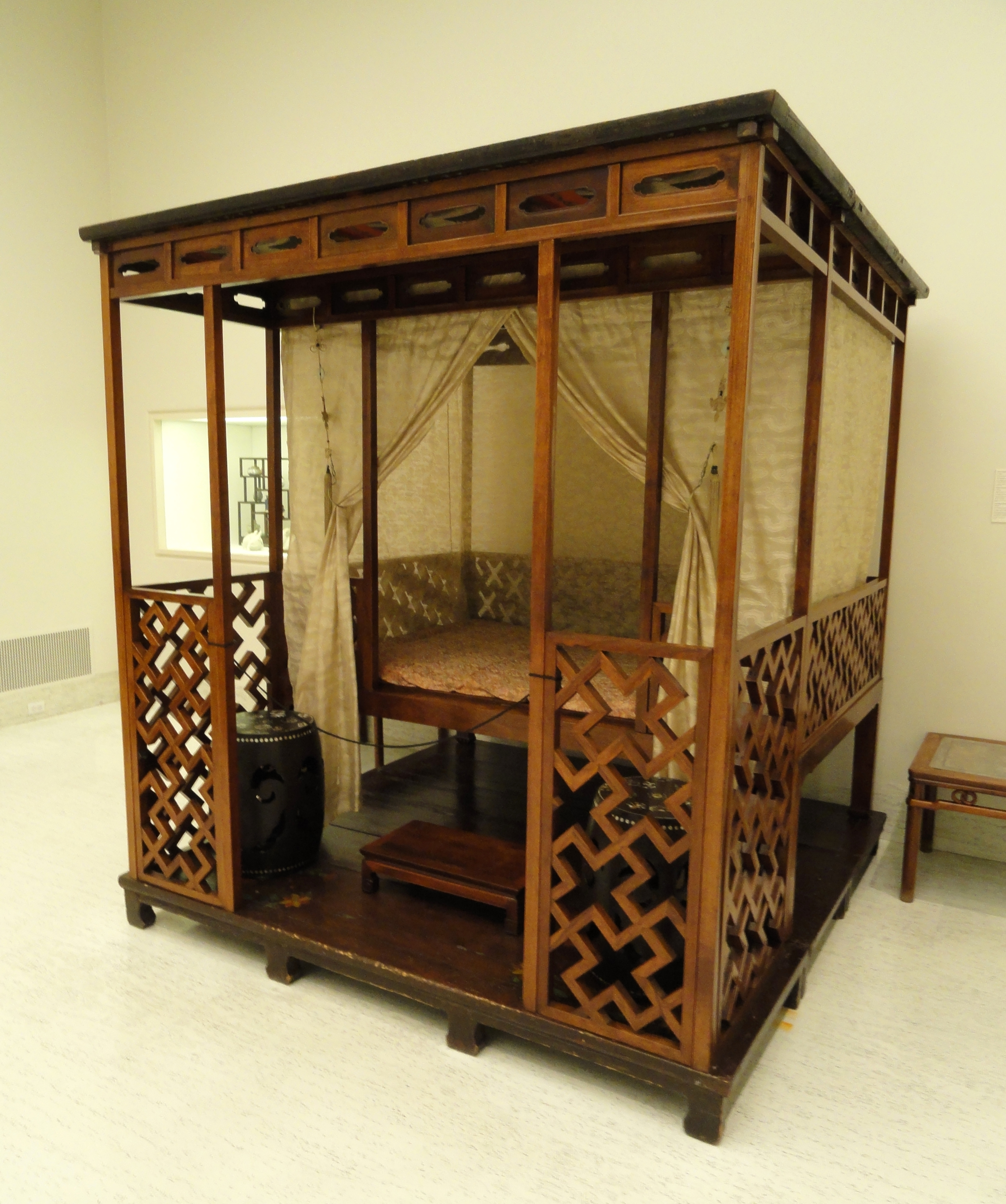
Testered Bed with Alcove, Ming Dynasty, 15th-16 century, huanghuali wood

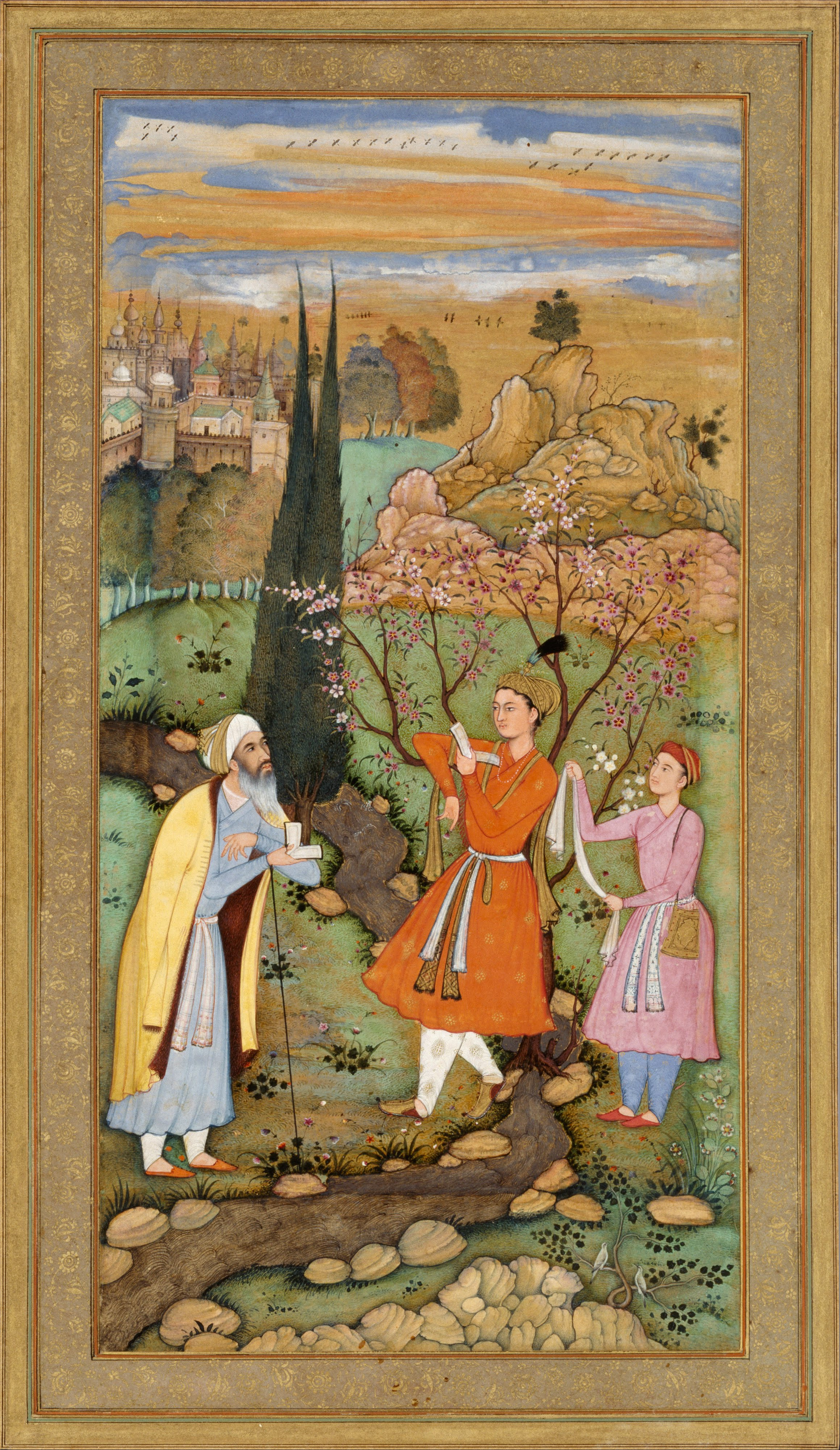
Salim Quli - Leaf from the Muraqqa Gulshan- The Poet and the Prince

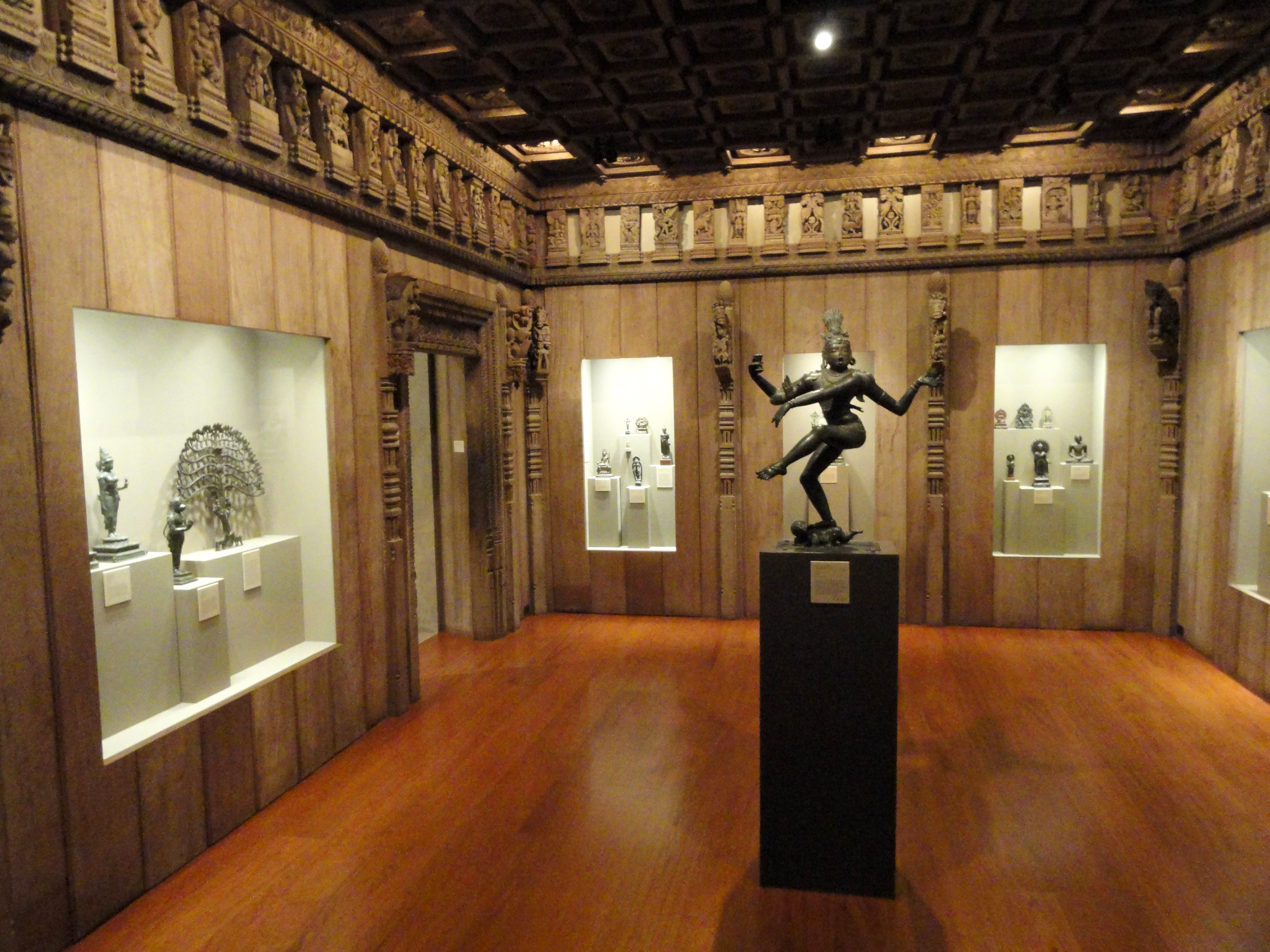
Statue of Shiva Nataraja from Tamil Nadu (in center) in Indian Collection Hall

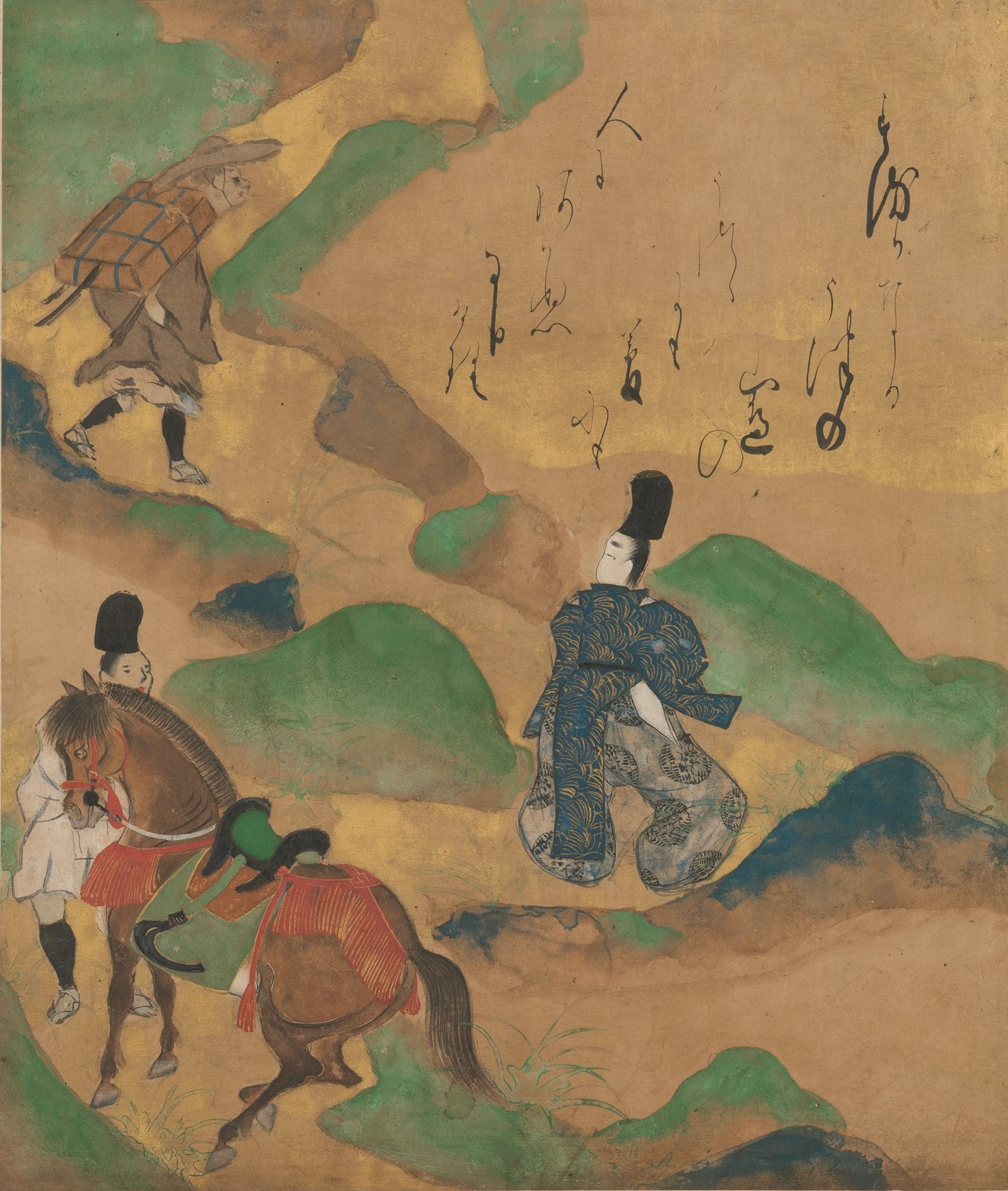
Tawaraya Sôtatsu "llustration from 'Tale of Ise' "

=== African ===
Most of the artworks in the museum's African collection were created by artists largely from West and Central Africa, primarily the countries of Mali, Cote d'Ivoire, Ghana, Nigeria, Cameroon, Gabon, and the Democratic Republic of the Congo. The Museum has a small collection from East and South Africa, including a mask carved by a Yao artist from Tanzania and beaded capes created by Zulu artists in the country of South Africa.

The Nelson-Atkins began collecting African art in the 1930s, with many notable acquisitions including two 17th-century cast brass objects from the Benin Kingdom in Nigeria in 1958. While the collection grew slowly until 1983, subsequent years saw more aggressive acquisitions. In 2012, African art gallery curator Nii Quarcoopome worked to add more content and ways for audiences to interact by including videos and photographs showing visitors how objects are used in ceremonies or everyday life. It includes 400 objects made from wood, brass, bead, terracotta, ivory and natural fibers. They have a variety of different cultures and tradition inside of the art world of the continent. These include a royal stool from the Asante people, a Standing Male Figure by a Hemba artist, a group of Kuba textiles, a Royal Beaded Throne created by a Bansoa artist in the Bamileke kingdom, a Female Mask (Kifwebe) by Songye artists, and a shrine figure carved by a Baga artist.

The museum held an exhibit called 'Through African Eyes: The European in African Art, 1500–Present' from September 25, 2010 - January 9, 2011. It was an examination of how African artists expressed the dynamic interactions between African cultures and Europeans and Westerners with 95 art pieces that reflect the theme from European colonization settlements in Africa, through the contemporary years of post-independence. Nii Quarcoopome was quoted as saying, "At the heart of the exhibition and its accompanying catalogue is the desire to give agency to African voices; indeed, the title, Through African Eyes, primarily obtains from this thinking. After all, what good is African art and history without the African voice?". This exhibition has been organized by the Detroit Institute of Arts where the exhibit first appeared. With support provided by the National Endowment for the Humanities and the National Endowment for the Arts. In Kansas City the exhibition is supported by The Helzberg Fund for African Art. The museum has also held a talk in February 2018, discussing and educating the audience on Pablo Picasso and his relationship with the arts of Africa and the world, as he bought African art from shady art dealers. The speakers included Julián Zugazagoitia, director and exhibition curator at Nelson Atkins, and art historian Peter Stepan who wrote a book on the subject.

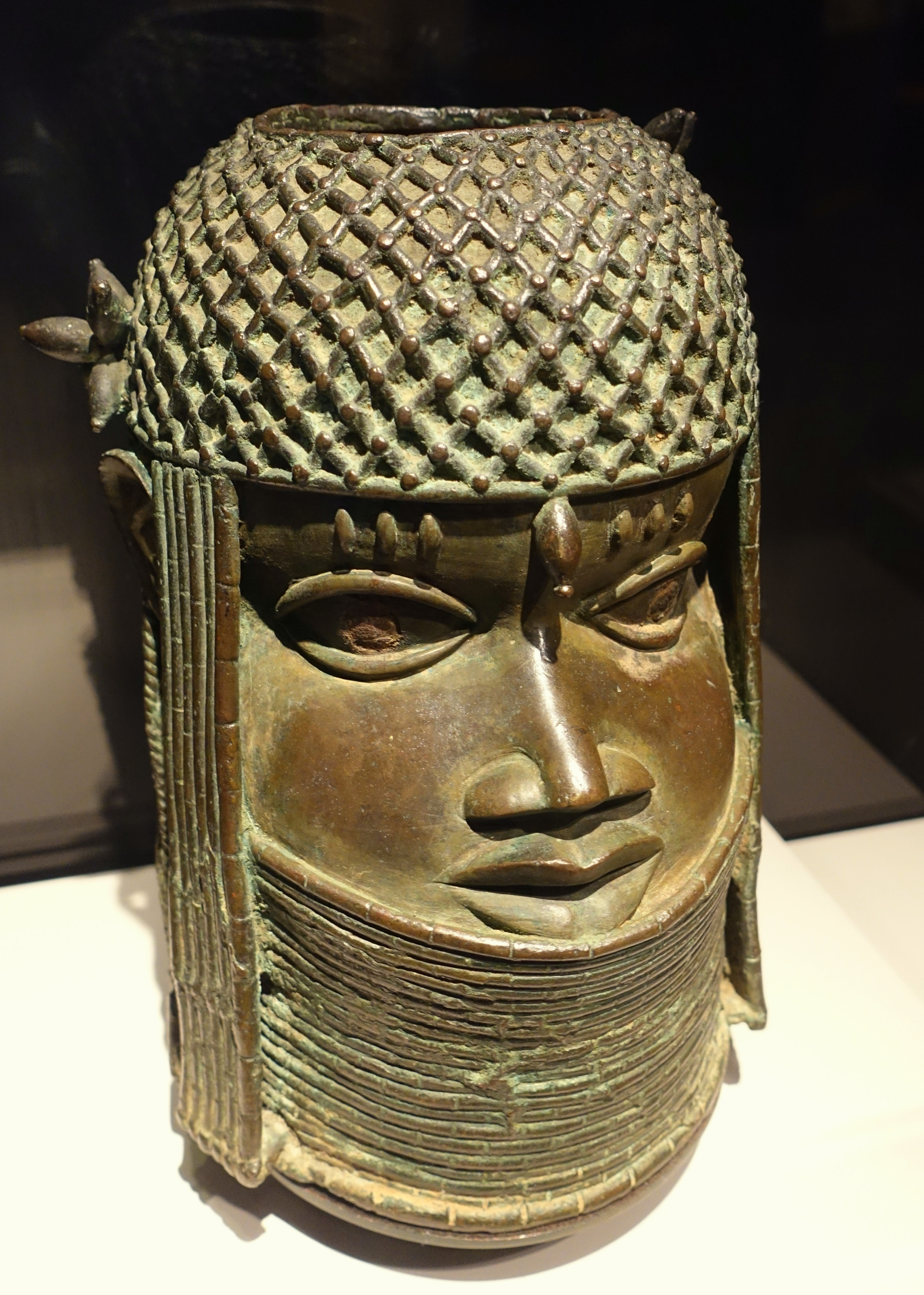
Commemorative Head of an Oba, Nigeria 16th century

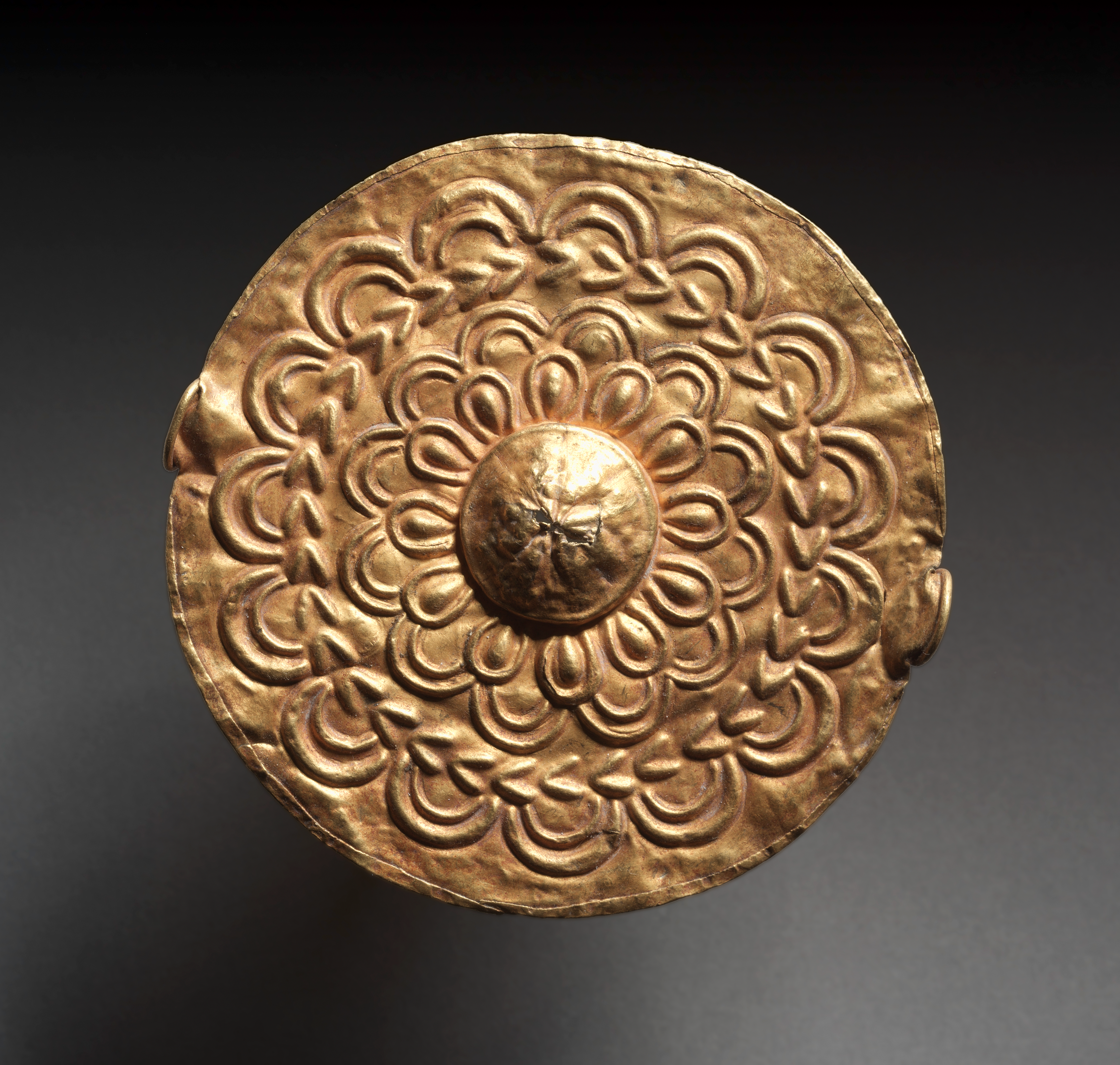
Soul washer's badge, Ghana, 19th century

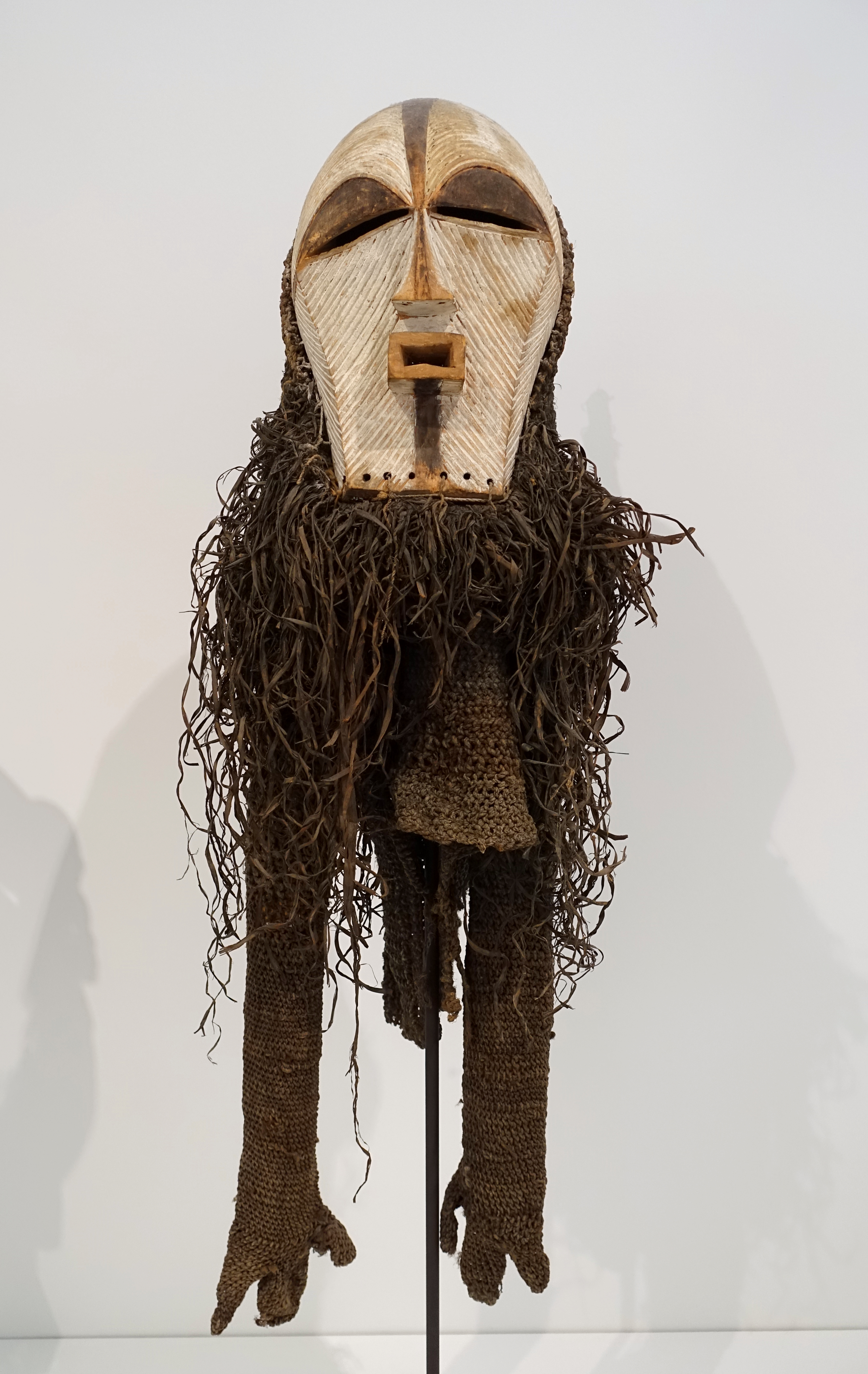
Mask of the Bwadi bwa Kifwebe Society, Democratic Republic of Congo, late 19th century.

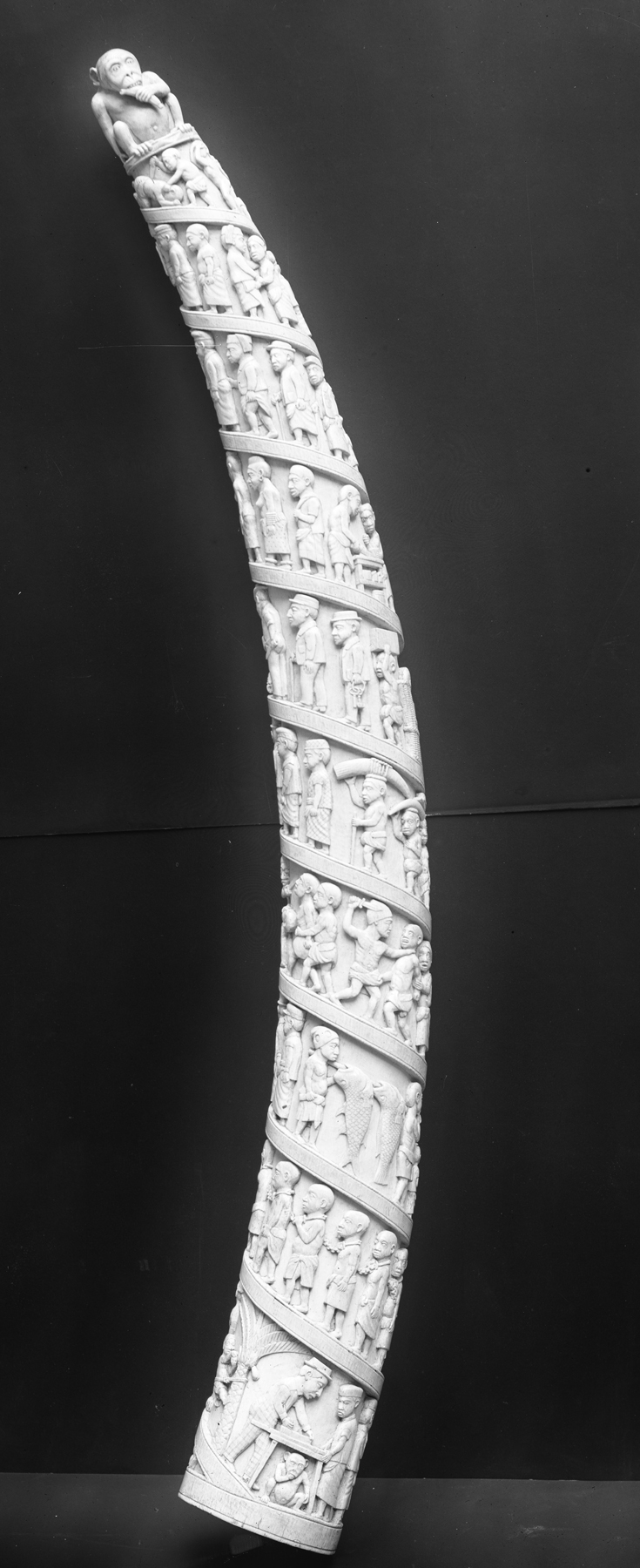
Elephant Tusk with Scenes of African life, Congolese

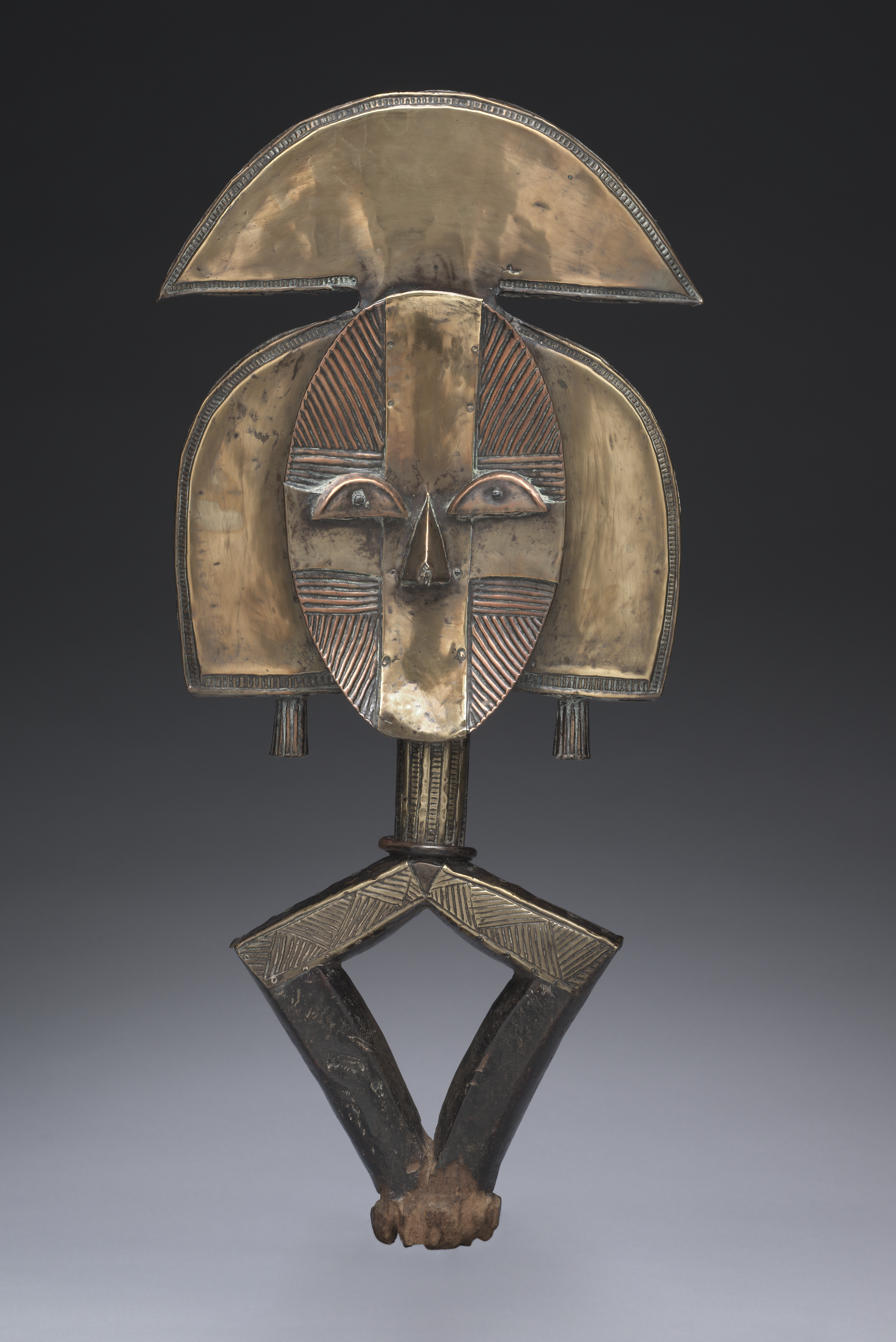
Reliquary Guardian Figure (Mbulu Ngulu or Mbulu Viti), Gabon, Kota people, 19th century

=== Native American ===
In 2009, the museum opened a suite of Native American art galleries, totaling 6,100 square feet, among the largest such displays in a comprehensive art museum with 200 pieces on display on average. Gaylord Torrence, the curator at the time of the Native American department, was able to acquire a majority of items with donations from Morton Sosland and other people. He helped find works from thousands of years old to modern Native American artists. Torrence has since retired. He went on to write Continuum: Native North American Art at The Nelson-Atkins Museum of Art. David Penney, associate director for museum research and scholarship at the National Museum of the American Indian has praised Torrence's work by saying “The Nelson's collection reflects a combination of history, age, formal characteristics that play to modernist connoisseurship, and a notion of spirituality. Those are the kinds of things that Gaylord values.”

The gallery includes work by Jamie Okuma, Roxanne Swentzell, Diego Romero, Joyce Growing Thunder Fogarty, Silver Horn and Butch Thunder Hawk. It also houses historical pieces like pottery, baskets, bead/quill/textile works, and paintings from the Arikara, Mississippian, Algonquian, Plains, Lakota, Kiowa, Cheyenne, Chumash, Navajo, and Pueblo tribes. The Nelson Atkins has worked through the Native American Graves Protection and Repatriation Act (NAGPRA) in collaboration with groups, tribes, and other forms of Native American communities to make to either repatriate or show Native American art in a cultural appropriate manner. Items that are claimed by an authority of the tribe are considered case by case, depending on the item's connection to a certain culture as well as what the Deputy Director of Curatorial Affairs, the Director/CEO, and the Trustee Members of the Committee decide is best for the item's future. Most repatriated items are related to grave sites or other cultural ceremonies.

The museum also hosts cultural performances as a way share and celebrate Indigenous cultures, mostly from the Midwest area. It includes singing, dancing, storytelling, and artwork from students of Haskell Indian Nations University and members of the Apache Indian Reservation, Plains Indians, Prairie Band Potawatomi, and Standing Rock Lakota, and various members of the Kansas City Indian Center.

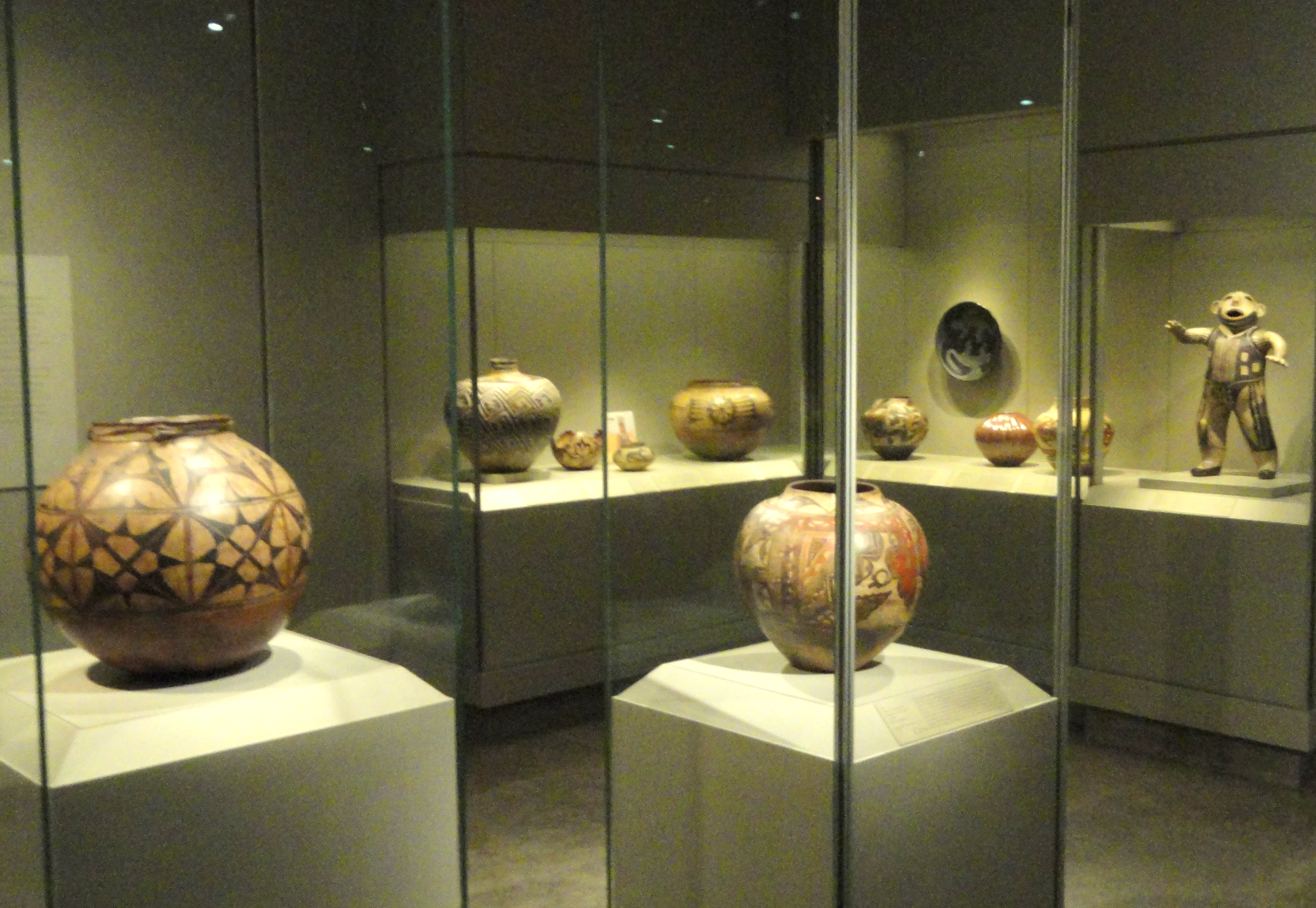
Native American Collection Hall (pottery)

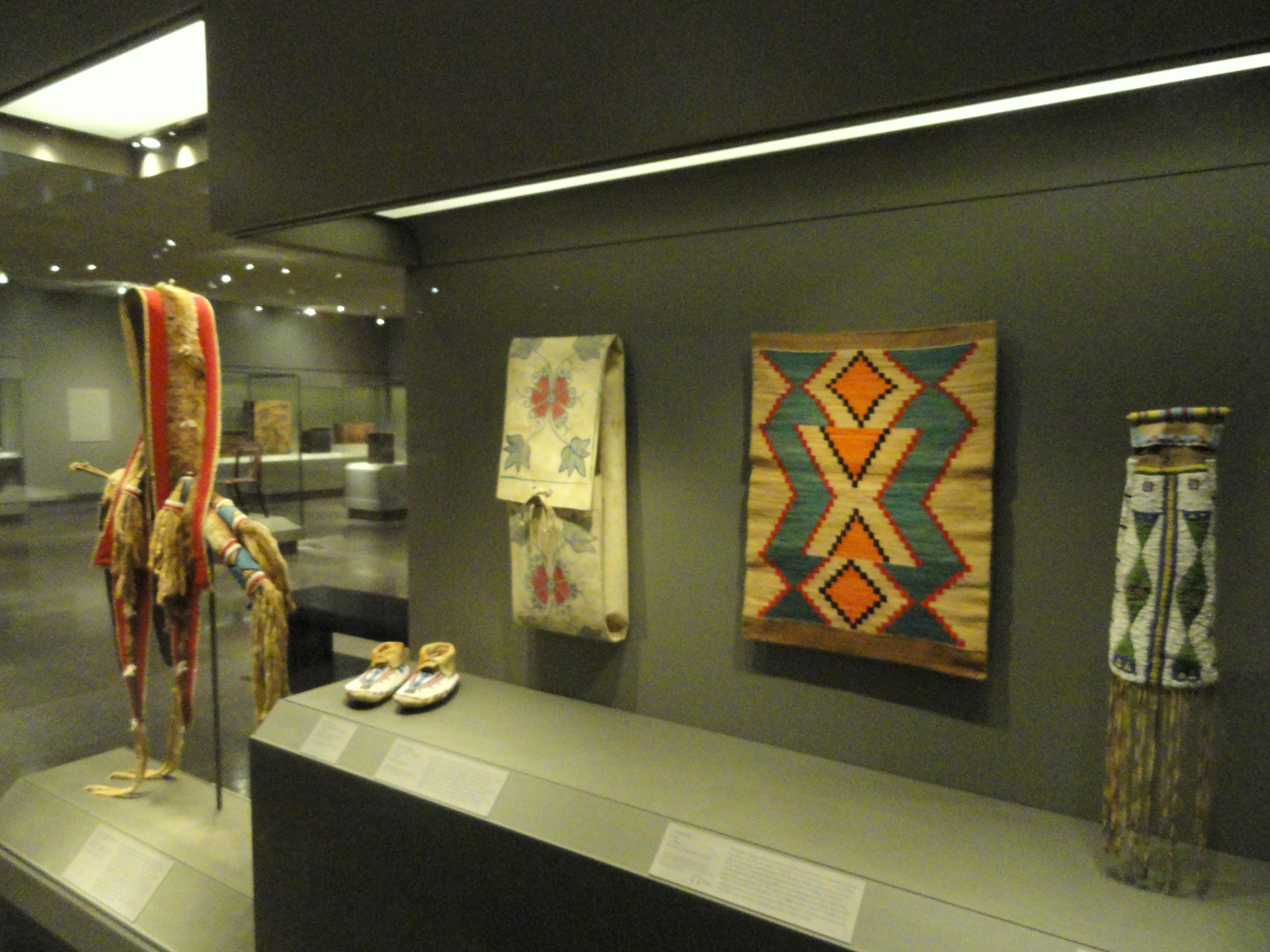
Native American Collection Hall (textiles)

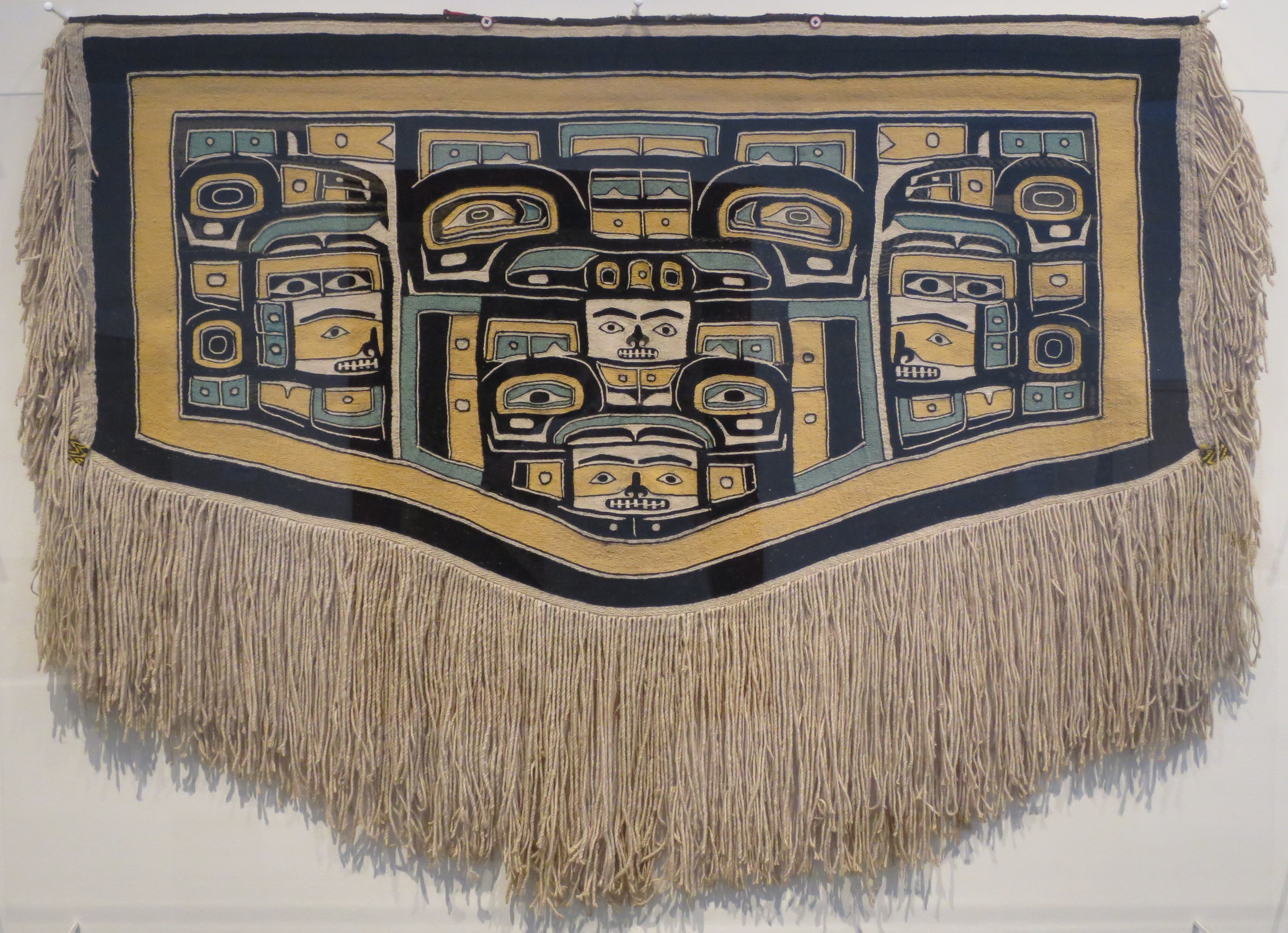
Mary Ebbetts Hunt, Chilkat robe

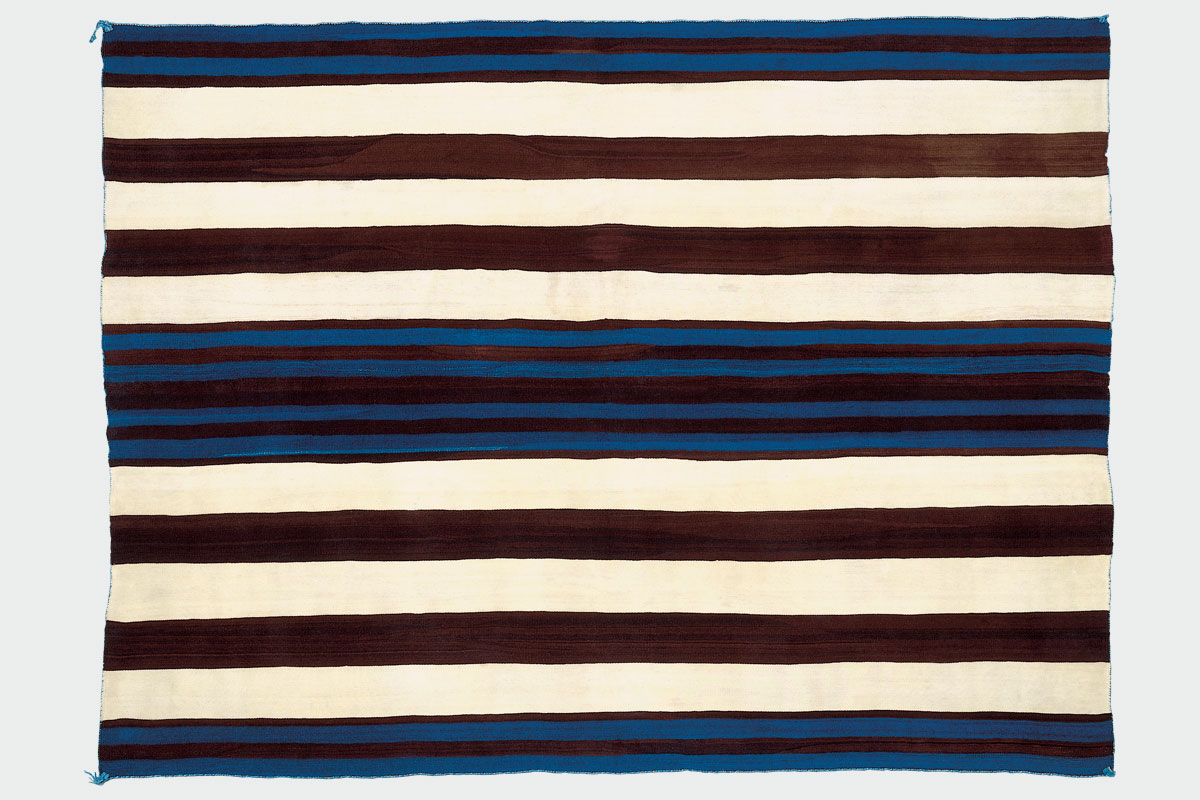
First Phase Chief Blanket, Navajo Tribe, 1850

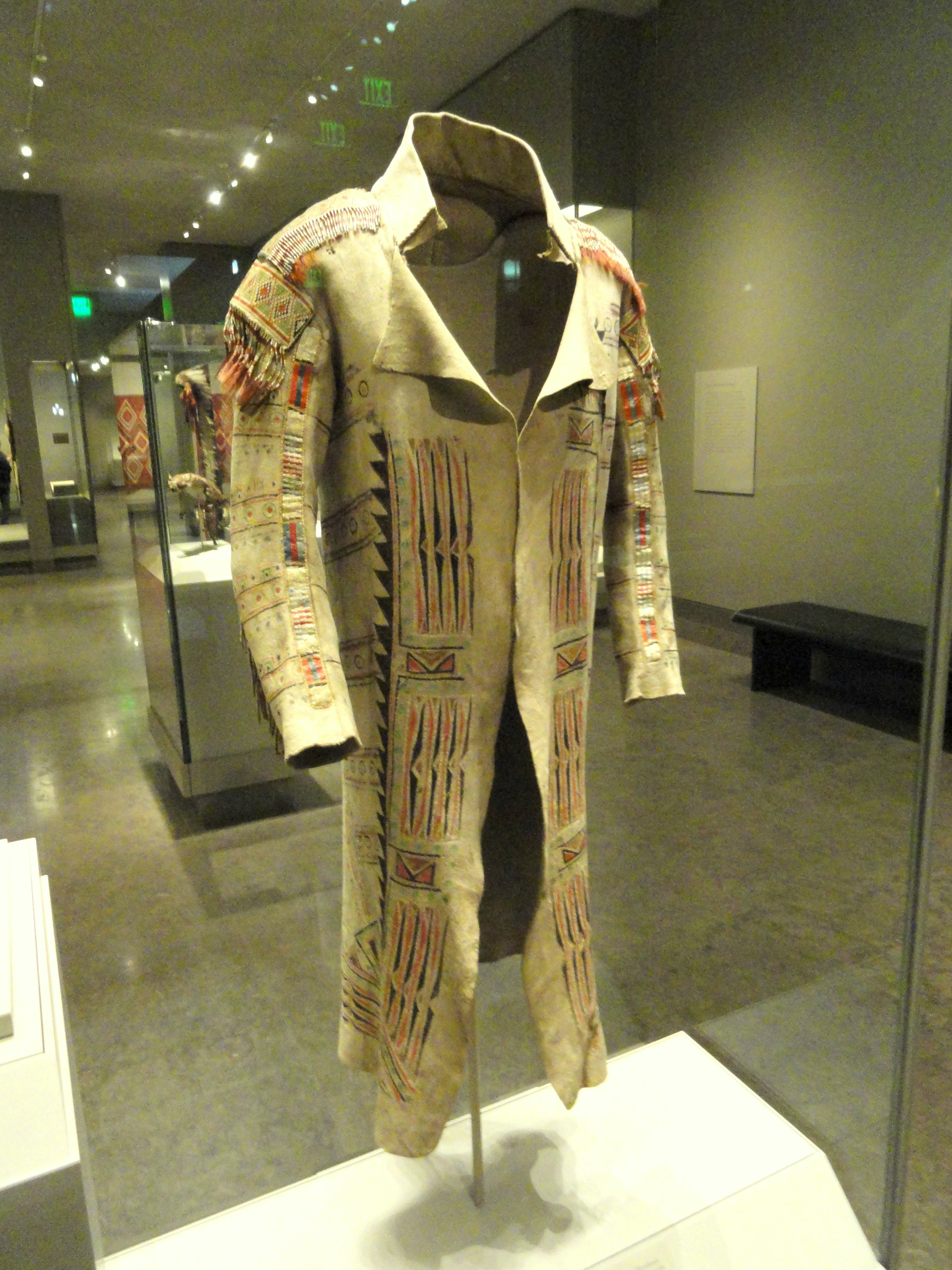
Coat, Ojibwa, Ontario, ca. 1789. Gift of Ned Jalbert in honor of the 75th anniversary

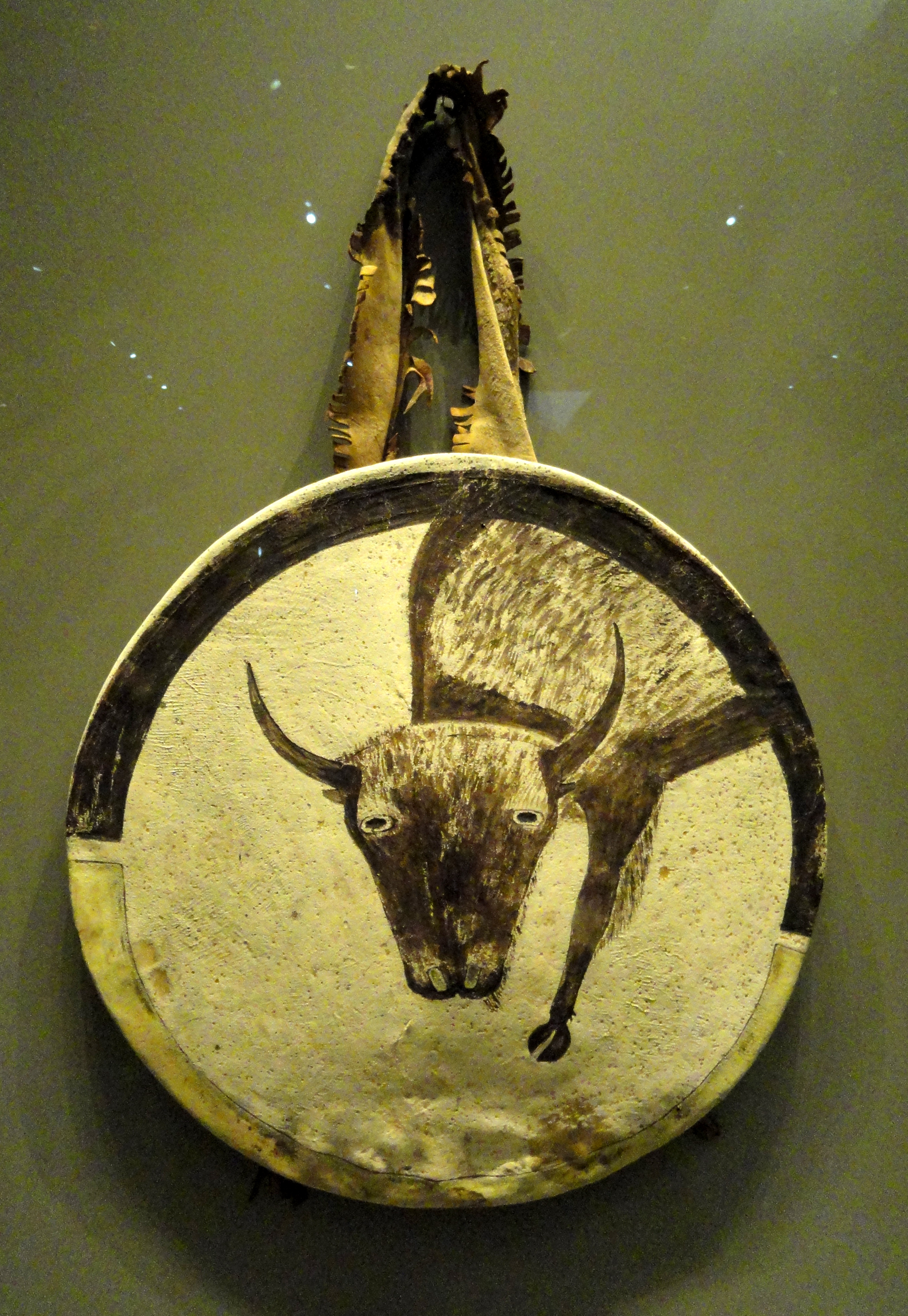
Shield, Arikara artist, North Dakota, ca. 1850

=== American ===
The American gallery contains art from American artists who aren't Native American. The collection includes the largest public collection of works by Thomas Hart Benton, who lived in Kansas City. Among its collection are paintings by George Bellows, George Caleb Bingham, Frederic Church, John Singleton Copley, Thomas Eakins, Winslow Homer, and John Singer Sargent. One of the more notable exhibits hosted was 30 Americans, which showed African American life through the eyes of 30 different artists from all over the country, including works from Jean-Michel Basquiat, Carrie Mae Weems, Kerry James Marshall, Mickalene Thomas, Rashid Johnson, Kara Walker, Hank Willis Thomas, and Kehinde Wiley. It contained 80 paintings, drawings, prints, sculptures, photographs, and videos.

The museum also has contemporary work in the Bloch Building by Willem de Kooning, Fairfield Porter, Wayne Thiebaud, Richard Diebenkorn, Agnes Martin, Bridget Riley, and Alfred Jensen.

In 2023, the museum won the painting Sailing by Thomas Eakins from a bet made by the Philadelphia Museum of Art after the Kansas City Chiefs won the Super Bowl against the Philadelphia Eagles

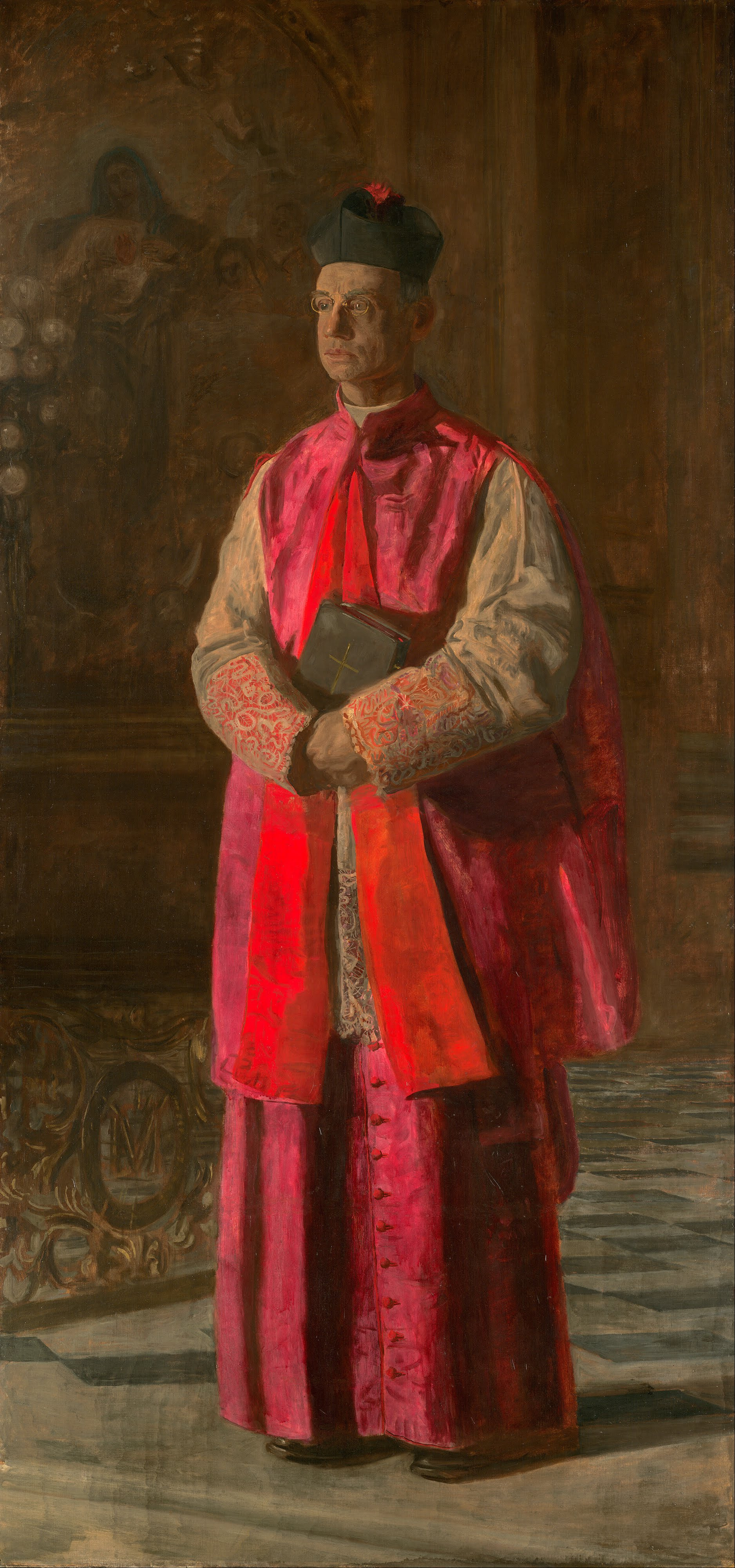
Thomas Eakins Monsignor James P. Turner

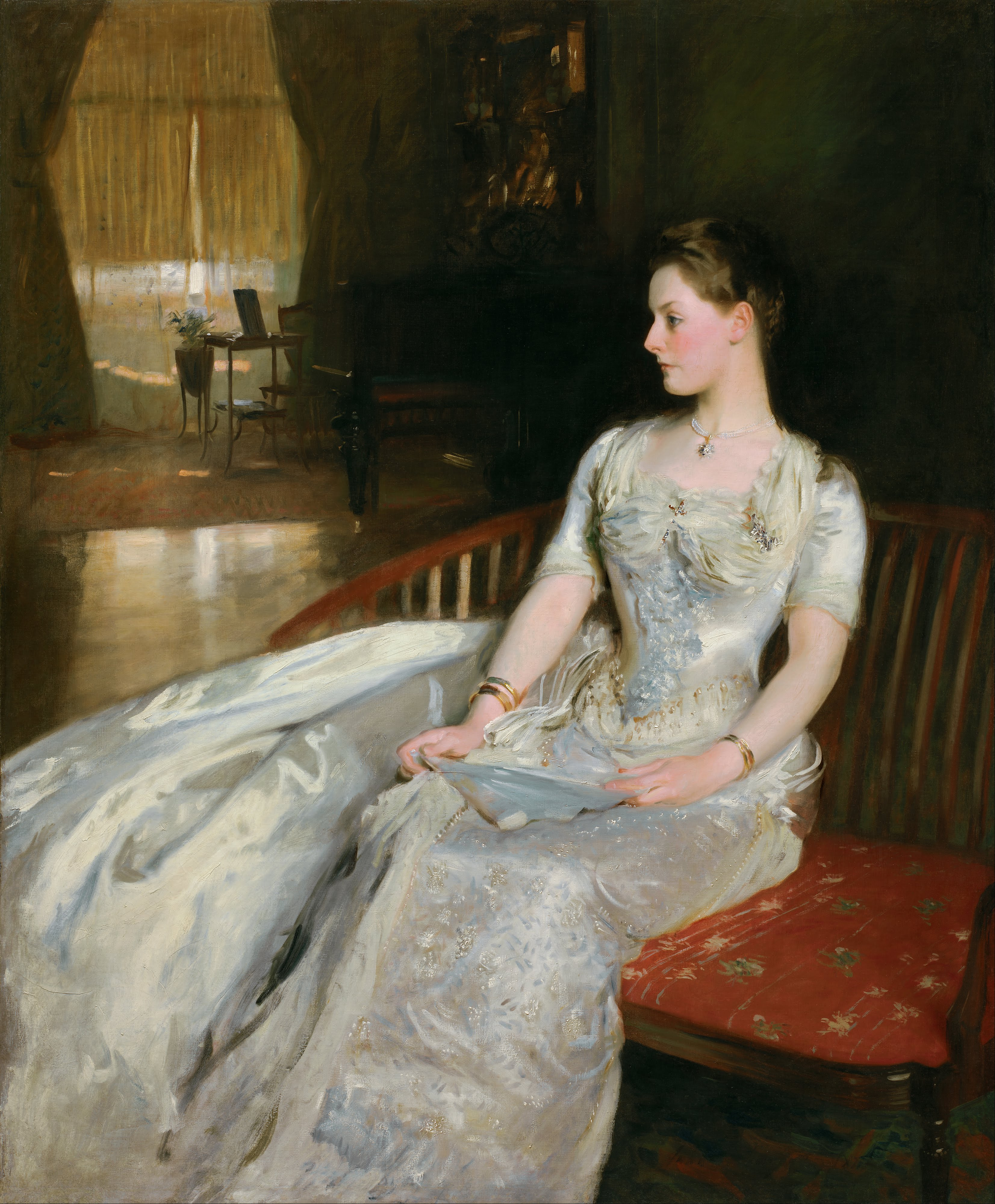
John Singer Sargent Mrs. Cecil Wade

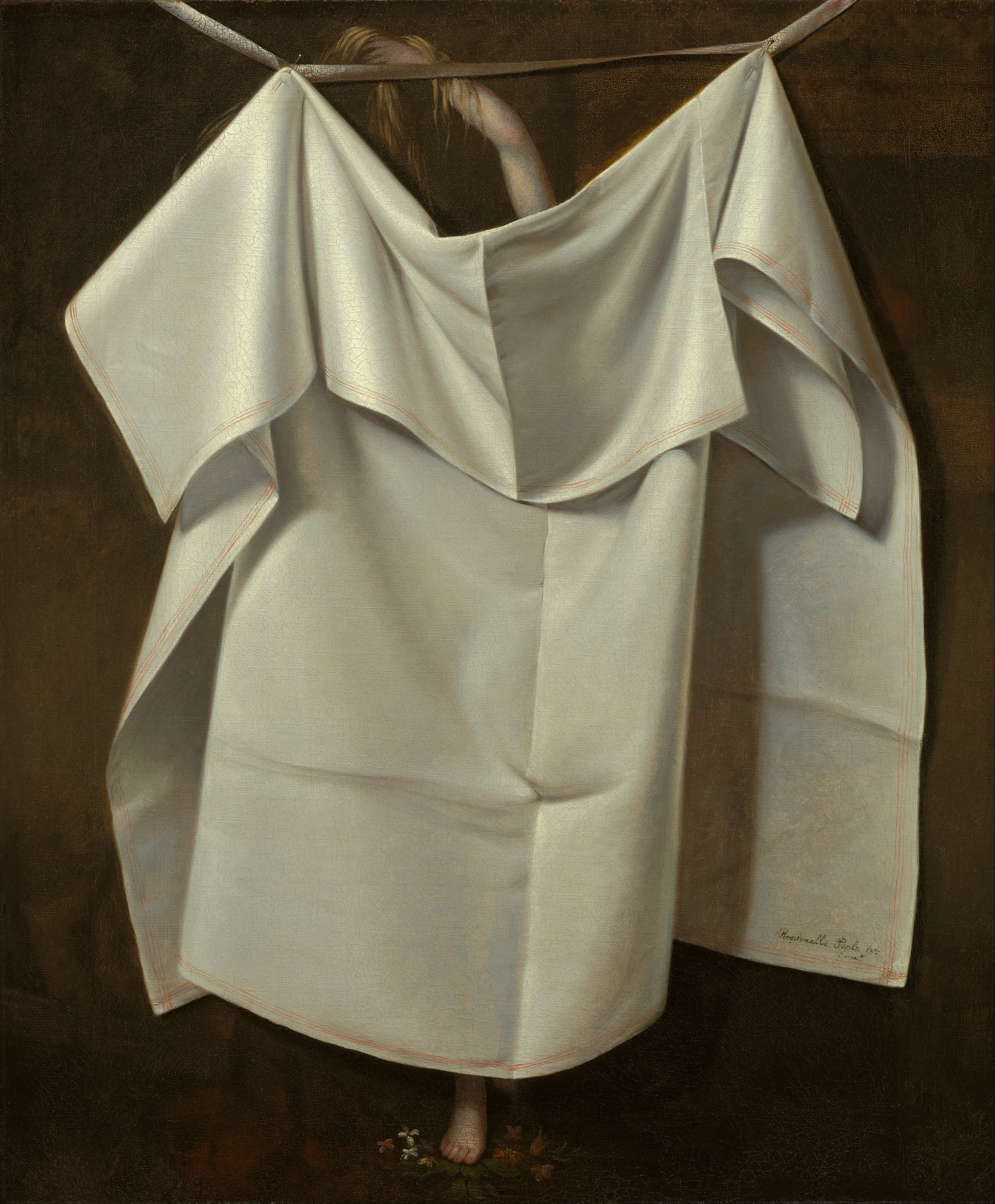
Raphaelle Peale Venus Rising From the Sea—A Deception

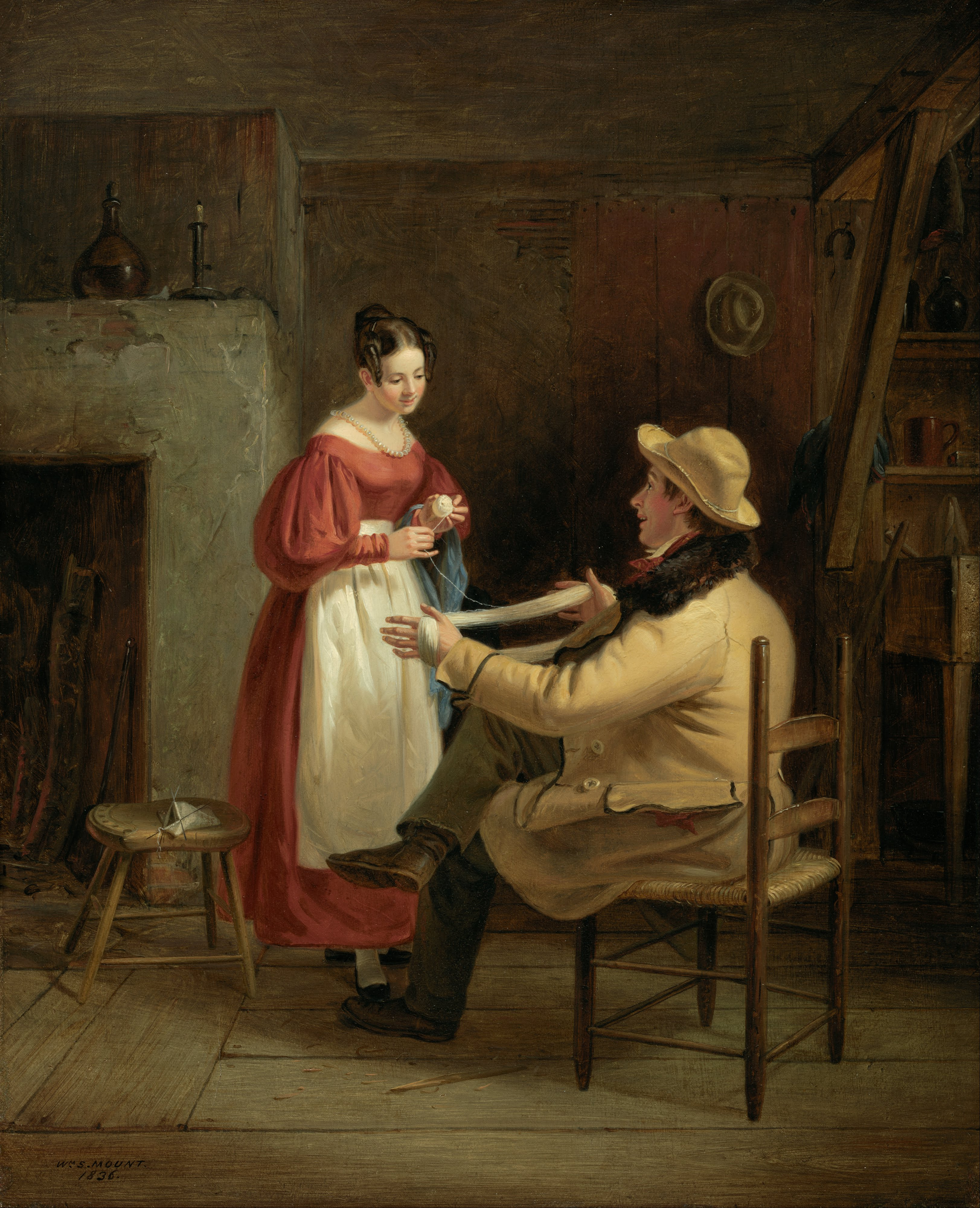
William Sidney Mount Winding Up

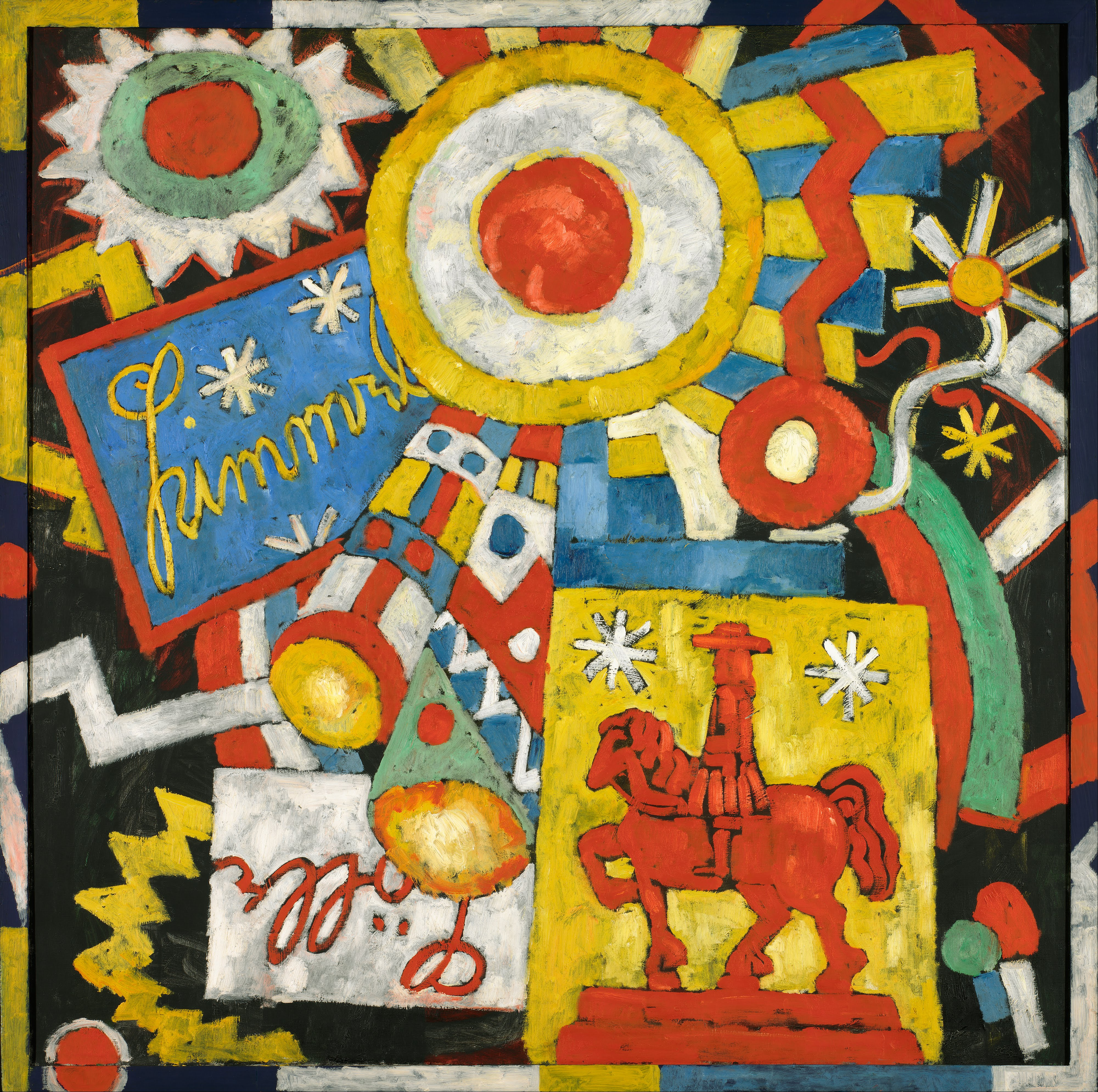
Marsden Hartley Himmel

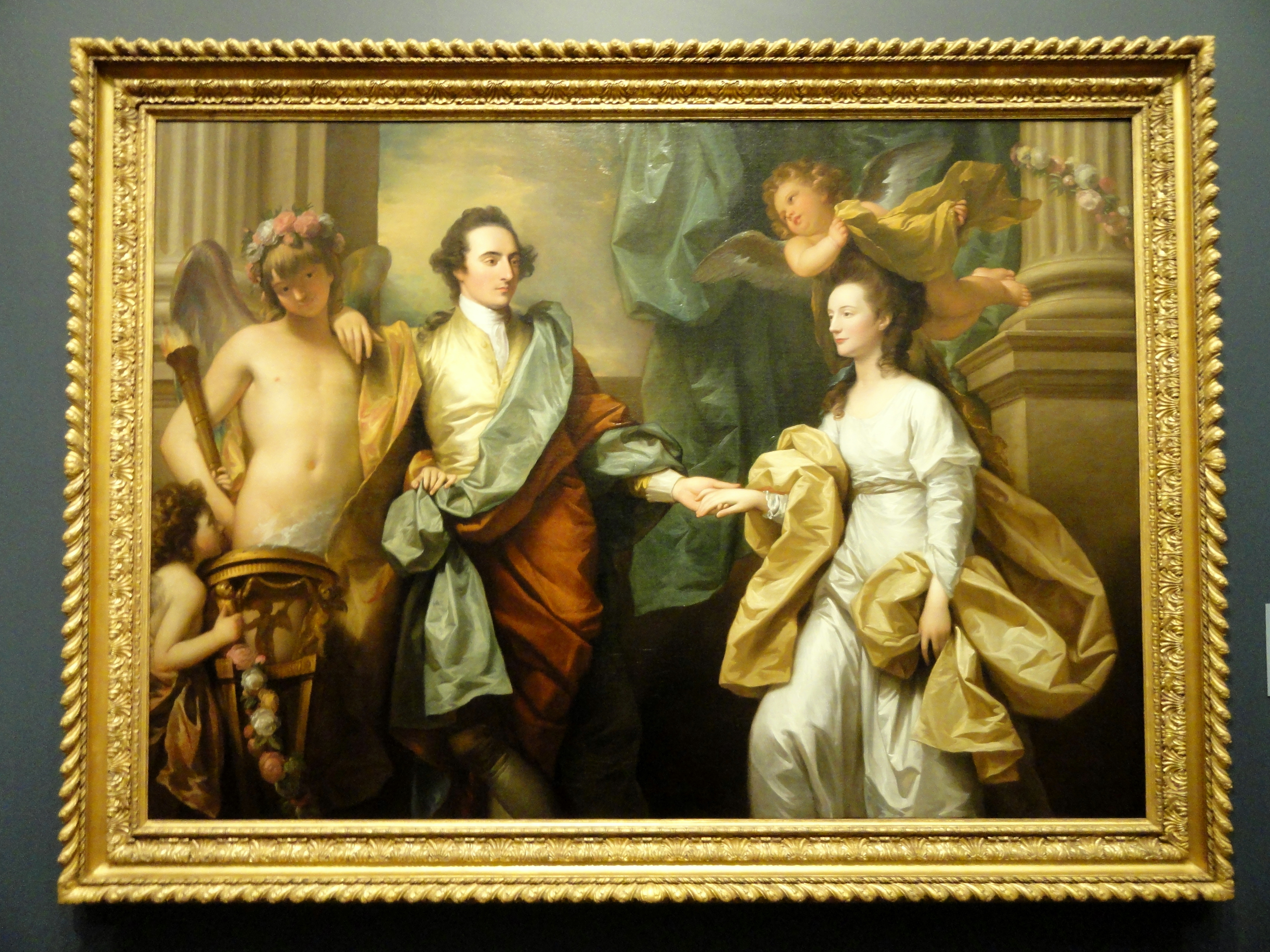
Benjamin West Mr. and Mrs. John Custance, 1778

=== Modern ===
This collection covers artistic work produced from the 1860s -1970s, including work of Cubism, Expressionism, Fauvism, Dada, Surrealism, Bauhaus and Abstract Expressionism. Pieces include works from Pablo Picasso, Jackson Pollock, Ernst Barlach, Max Beckmann, Joseph Cornell, Juan Gris, Ernst Ludwig Kirchner, Paul Klee, Jacques Lipchitz, Roberto Matta Echaurren, Joan Miró, Ben Nicholson, Emil Nolde, Yves Tanguy, Willem de Kooning, Philip Guston, Grace Hartigan, Robert Motherwell, Constantin Brancusi, Alexander Calder, Alberto Giacometti, Henry Moore, Marcel Duchamp, Adolph Gottlieb, and Man Ray. The museum has thanked the Friends of Art group in Kansas City, the Hall Family Foundation, donations from other individuals, and companies (like Commerce Bank and Trust) for helping to acquire the art.

=== Photography ===
The Photography galleries in the Bloch Building display a survey of the creative history of the medium from daguerreotypes to 21st-century processes. New installations are presented about three times a year. The museum also houses the oldest known photo of slaves in the US, taken in 1850 by an unknown artist and is believed to have been taken in Georgia.

In 2006, Hallmark Cards chairman Donald J. Hall, Sr. donated to the museum the entire Hallmark Photographic Collection, spanning the history of photography from 1839 to the present day. It is primarily American in focus, and includes works from photographers such as Southworth & Hawes, Carleton Watkins, Timothy O'Sullivan, Alvin Langdon Coburn, Alfred Stieglitz, Dorothea Lange, Homer Page, Harry Callahan, Lee Friedlander, Andy Warhol, Todd Webb, and Cindy Sherman, among others.

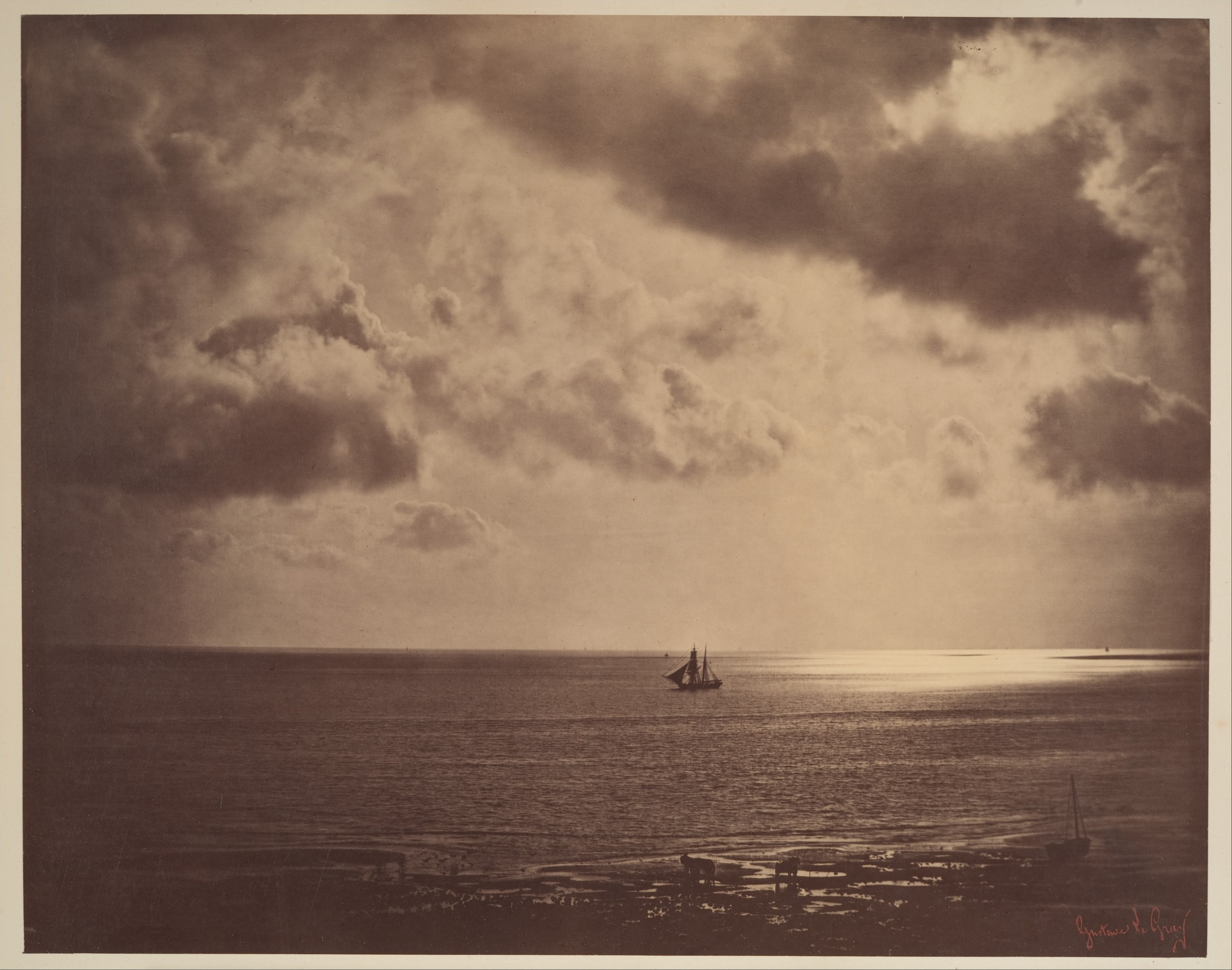
Gustave Le Gray Brig on the Water

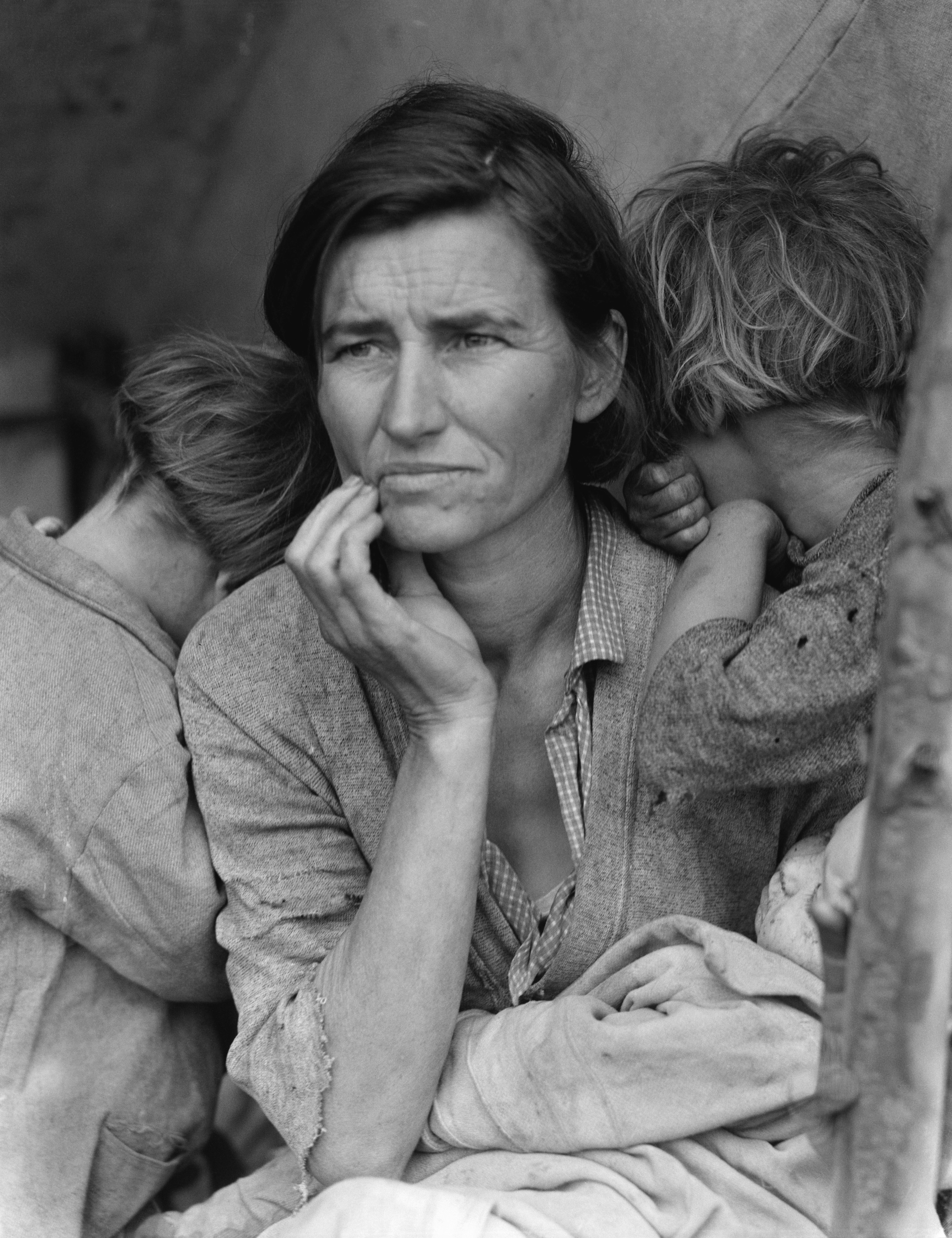
Dorothea Lange Migrant Mother, Nipomo, California

Alvin Langdon Coburn House of a Thousand Windows

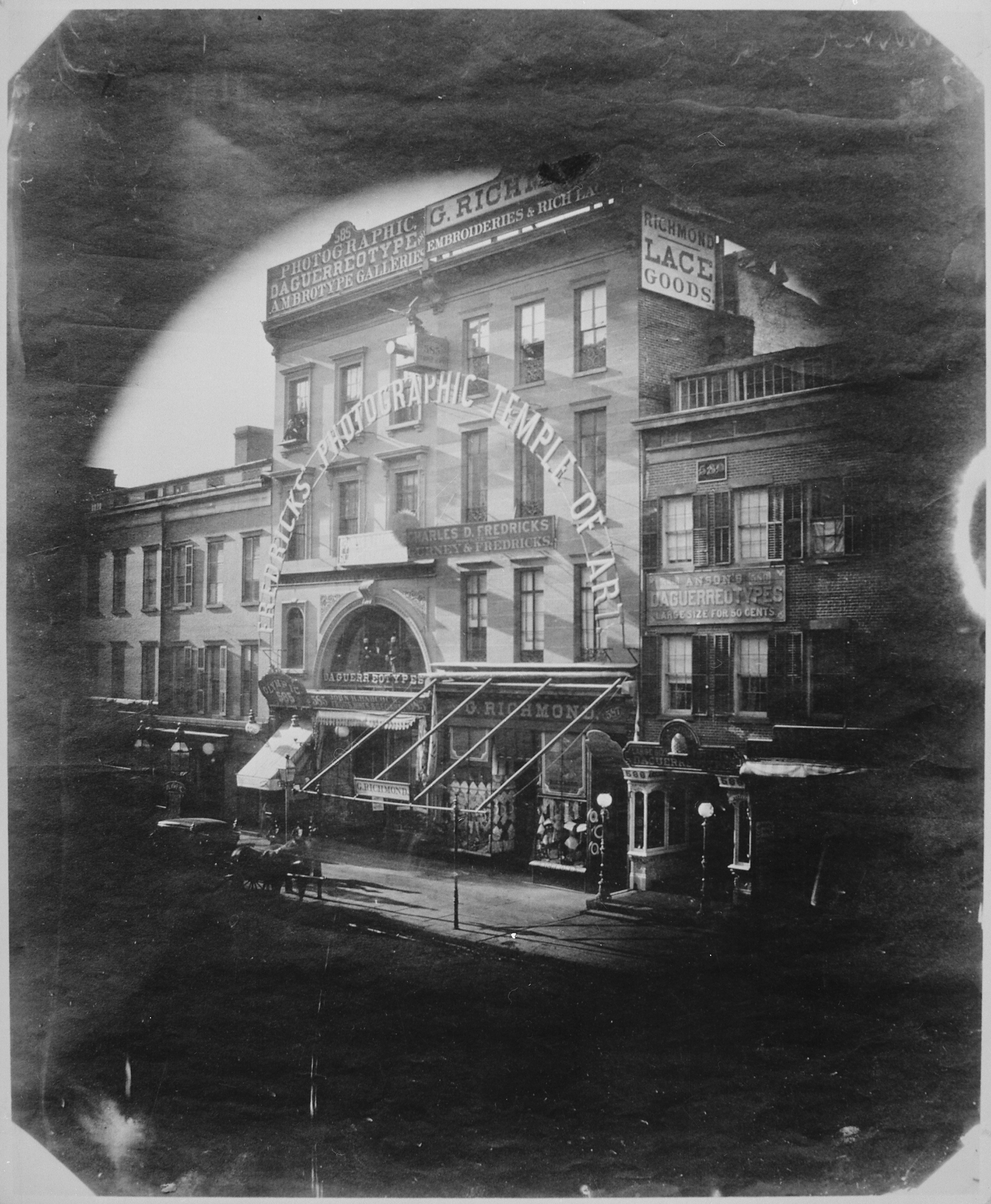
Charles D. Fredricks Fredricks’ Photographic Temple of Art, Broadway, New York

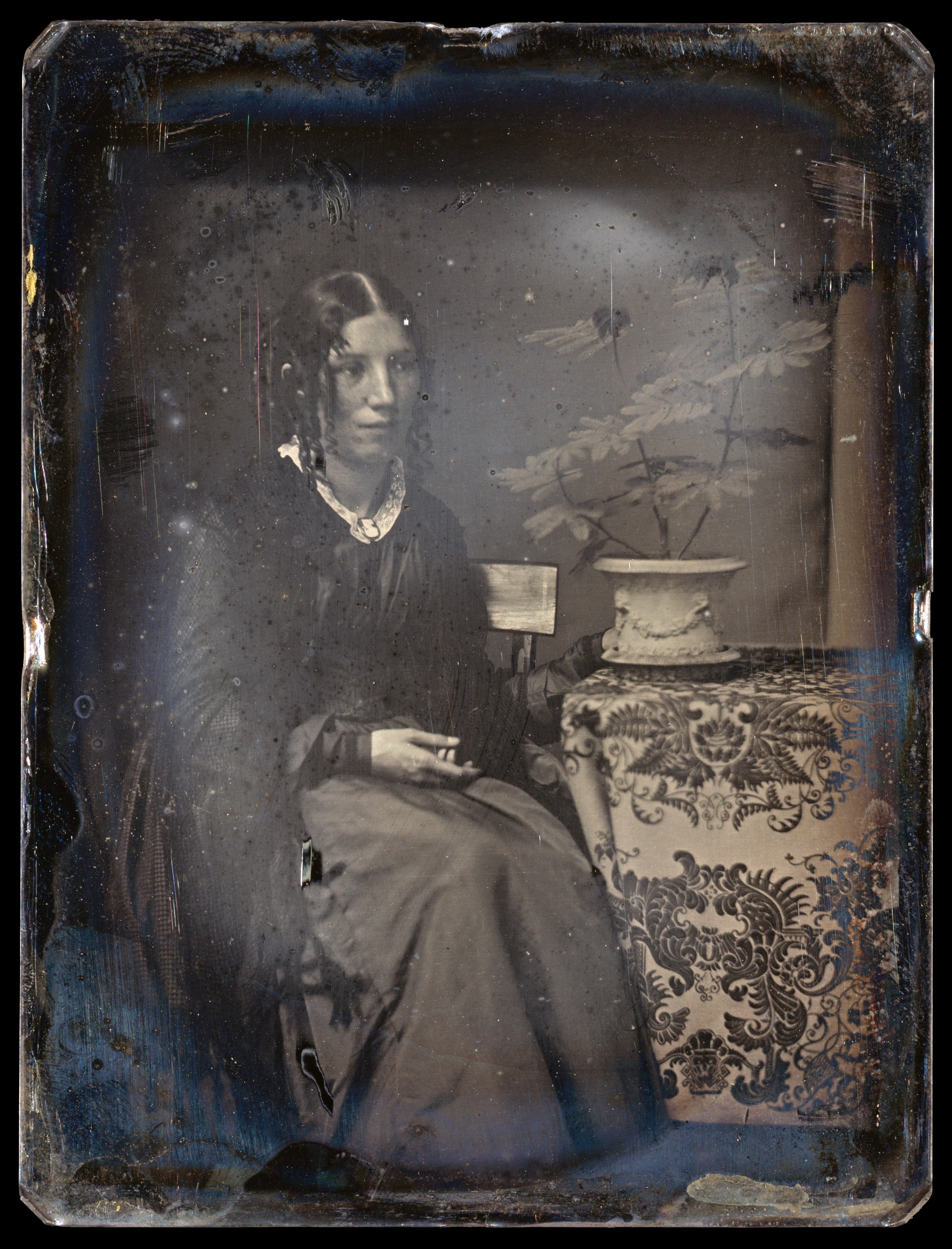
Albert Sands Southworth and Josiah Johnson Hawes Harriet Beecher Stowe

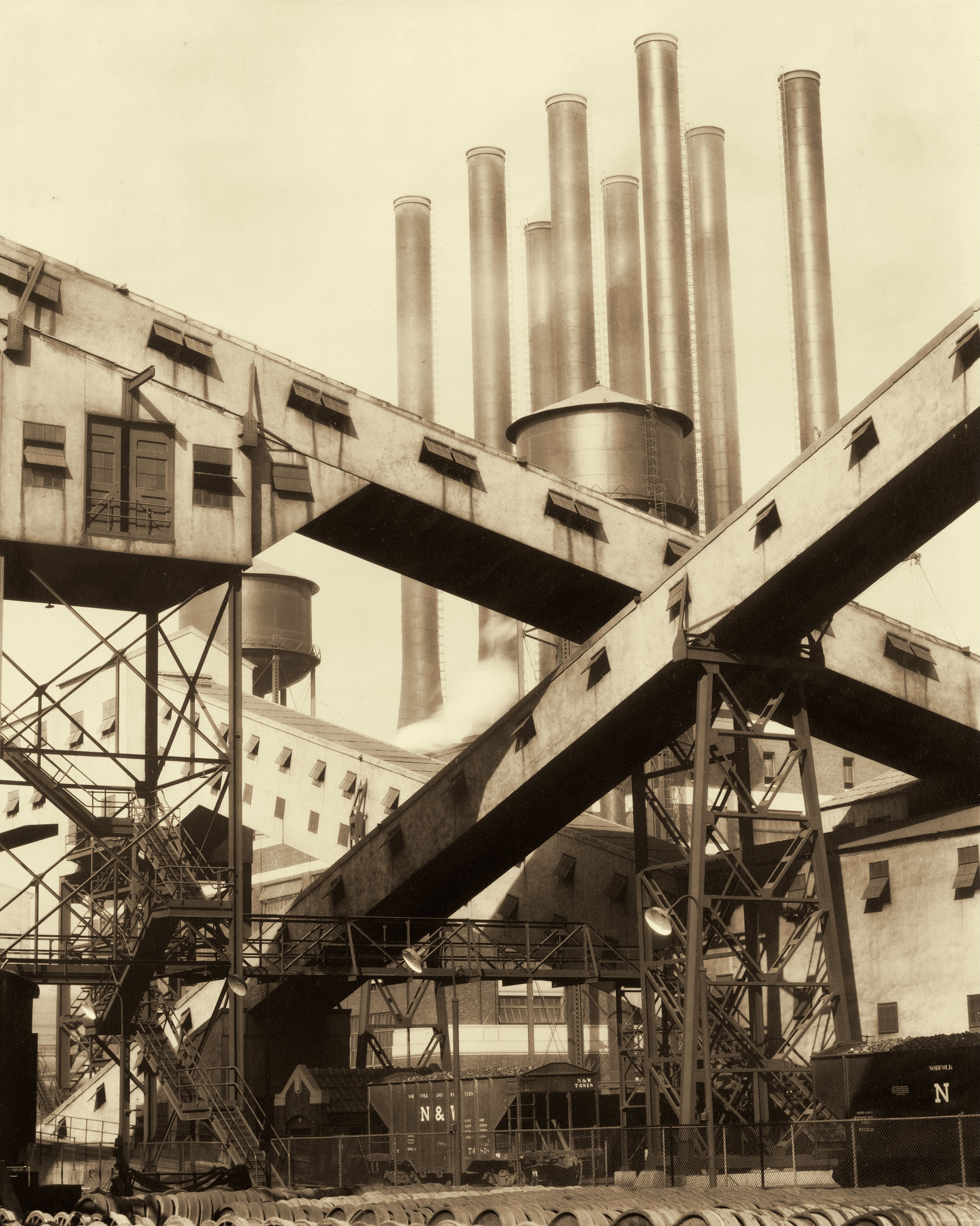
Charles Sheeler Criss-Crossed Conveyors–Ford Plant

=== Contemporary ===
Contemporary art is located in the Bloch building and is defined in Nelson-Atkins as art from 1960 to present day. Styles include Pop, Minimalism, Conceptual and Realism, from different parts of the world and cultures. Art pieces are either gifts from The William T. Kemper Collecting Initiative or acquired or donated by famous artists like: Jackson Pollock, Andy Warhol, Anish Kapoor, Robert Rauschenberg, Yinka Shonibare, Duane Hansen, Louise Nevelson, Donald Judd, Robert Arneson, Jim Dine, Nancy Graves, Bridget Riley, Elizabeth Murray, Robert Mangold, Ronnie Landfield, Kerry James Marshall, El Anatsui, Raqib Shaw, Willem de Kooning, Mark Rothko, David Smith, Richard Diebenkorn, Richard Estes, Duane Hanson, Claes Oldenburg, Sol LeWitt, Agnes Martin, Bridget Riley, Martin Puryear, and Deborah Butterfield

The Noguchi Sculpture Court houses contemporary sculptures that were gifted by the Hall Family Foundation's Modern Sculpture Initiative. At the south end of the Bloch Building, this is the third largest collection of Isamu Noguchi, outside of New York and Japan.

=== Design and decorative arts ===
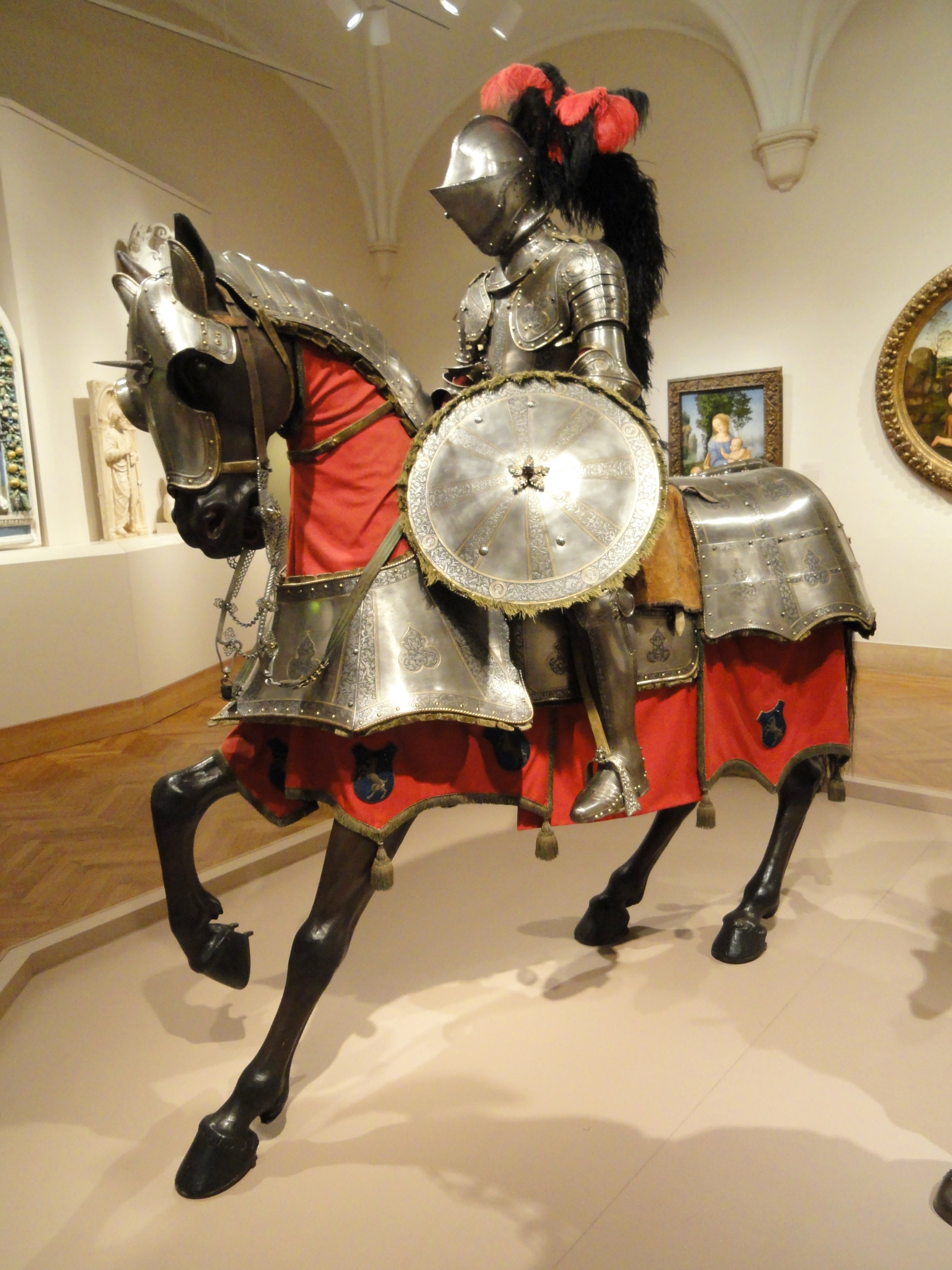
Armor for Man and Horse, Italy c. 1565

Ranging from medieval stained glass to 21st-century furniture from Kansas City artists, the museum houses pieces of architecture and decorative arts. Some significant pieces are an armor set for both a knight and his horse from 16th-century Italy and more than 1,300 examples of English pottery in the Burnap Collection. Works made during the 18th century form the larger concentration, including pottery, porcelain, silver, furniture. Donations from the Folgers Coffee Corporation and the Wallenstein family add other media to the understanding of 18th-century art and culture. Outside of 18th century art is the collection of 19th-21st century works. Includes many design movements, including the Art Nouveau, Bauhaus, to works produced today. Recent acquisitions have furniture, ceramics and silverwork. Decorative Arts are displayed throughout the galleries and put into exhibits. Unlike paintings, the decorative arts have other uses than for display so will help highlight the context the item was used for.

=== Donald J. Hall Sculpture Park ===
Outside on the museum's immense lawn, the Donald J. Hall Sculpture Park, designed by Dan Kiley, contains the largest collection of monumental bronzes by Henry Moore in the United States. The park also includes works by Alexander Calder, Auguste Rodin, George Segal and Mark di Suvero, among others. Beyond these, the park (and the museum itself) is well known for Shuttlecocks, a four-part outdoor sculpture of oversized badminton shuttlecocks, standing 18 feet tall, by Claes Oldenburg and Coosje van Bruggen.

== Provenance research ==
The Nelson-Atkins Museum of Art conducts provenance research to document the ownership histories of objects in its collection. This research aims to clarify the origins of artworks and address questions about past acquisitions.

One initiative in this area was the exhibition Origins: Collecting to Create the Nelson-Atkins, which examined how the museum built its collection. The exhibition highlighted key dealers and collectors, including C. T. Loo, who played a role in shaping the museum’s holdings.

== See also ==
- Kemper Museum of Contemporary Art
