= List of Cooper Union alumni =

This is a list of notable alumni of the Cooper Union for the Advancement of Science and Art. Awards received by Cooper Union alumni include one Nobel Prize in Physics, a Pritzker Prize, fifteen Rome Prizes, 26 Guggenheim Fellowships, three MacArthur Fellowships, nine Chrysler Design Awards, three American Institute of Architects Thomas Jefferson Awards for Public Architecture, a SEA Write Award, and one Queen Elizabeth Prize for Engineering. The school also boasts 39 Fulbright Scholars since 2001, and thirteen National Science Foundation Graduate Research Fellowships since 2004.

To ensure that this list remains useful to all, please refer to Wikipedia's standards for notability before adding anyone to this list.

== A ==
- Adjoa Amoa, Renowned Architect
- George G. Adams (engineer), mechanical engineer
- Jon Agee, author and illustrator of children's books
- John Alcorn (1935–1992), illustrator
- Stan Allen, former Dean of the School of Architecture, Princeton University
- Daniel Arsham, artist, with alumnus Alex Mustonen established Snarkitecture
- David Attie (1920–1982), photographer

== B ==
- Donald Baechler, painter
- Firelei Báez, artist
- Alex Bag, video artist
- Elizabeth Gowdy Baker (1860–1927), portraitist
- Katherine M. Ball (1859-1952), art educator, especially of Asian art
- Shigeru Ban, pioneer of "Paper Architecture", winner of the Pritzker Architecture Prize (2014)
- Karen Bausman, Rome Prize recipient, the only American woman architect to hold both the Eliot Noyes (Harvard) and Eero Saarinen (Yale) chairs
- Max Becher, artist and educator
- Dave Berg (1920–2002), cartoon artist and main contributor of Mad magazine illustrations
- Renata Bernal, painter
- Theodore H. Berlin (1917-1962), theoretical physicist
- Emile Berliner (1851–1929), invented the vinyl record
- Billy Bitzer (1872–1944), cinematographer
- Victor Gustav Bloede (1849–1937), chemist and philanthropist; protege' of Peter Cooper
- Louise Brann (1906–1982), muralist
- Norman Bridwell (1928–2014), cartoonist and creator of Clifford the Big Red Dog
- Kadar Brock, contemporary abstract artist
- Steve Brodner, cartoonist
- Ronald Brookmeyer, public health researcher; professor of biostatistics at UCLA
- Dik Browne (1917–1989), cartoonist and creator of Hägar the Horrible
- Jennie Augusta Brownscombe (1850-1936), artist
- Lee Brozgol (1941–2021), visual artist, educator, and social worke
- Kevin Burke, CEO of Consolidated Edison

== C ==
- Albert Carnesale, former chancellor of UCLA and dean of the Kennedy School of Government at Harvard
- Alfred Clark (1873–1950), inventor, cinematic director, and media executive
- Martin Charnin (1934–2019), Tony Award-winning lyricist, writer, and theatre director
- Remy Charlip (1929–2012), choreographer, writer, and illustrator
- Ching Ho Cheng (1946–1989), artist
- John Walter Christie (1865–1944), engineer and inventor
- Seymour Chwast, graphic designer, co-founder of Push Pin Studios
- Clio Newton, artist
- Guy Coheleach, wildlife artist
- Anna Botsford Comstock (1854-1930), leader in the nature study educational movement, author, illustrator, and first female professor at Cornell University
- Anna Conway, painter
- Miriam Cooper (1891–1976), actress
- E. Miriam Coyrière, educator and entrepreneur
- Will Cotton, painter
- William L. Coulter (1865–1907), architect
- Joshua Lionel Cowen (1877–1965), inventor of the flash-lamp and co-founder of Lionel Corporation
- Amy Cutler, artist

== D ==
- Noah Davis (1983-2015), painter and founder of the Underground Museum in Los Angeles
- Peggy Deamer, Emeritus Professor of Architecture at Yale
- Roy DeCarava (1919–2009), photographer
- William Francis Deegan (1882–1932), architect and political leader, namesake of the Major Deegan Expressway
- Bruce Degen, illustrator for The Magic School Bus
- Freda Diamond (1905–1998), industrial designer known for designing mass market home goods
- Elizabeth Diller, with Ricardo Scofidio, the first architects to win a MacArthur Prize co-founder of Diller Scofidio + Renfro
- Michael Doret, graphic designer, font designer, lettering artist
- Lou Dorfsman (1918–2008), graphic designer art director for CBS
- Eric Drooker, painter and author
- William Dubilier (1888–1969), inventor of the mica capacitor and radio pioneer
- Clive Dym, chair of the engineering department at Harvey Mudd College; professor at Stanford

== E ==
- John M. Eargle (1931–2007), Oscar and Grammy-winning audio engineer and musician
- Thomas Edison (1847–1931), inventor
- Allegra Eggleston (1860–1933), artist and illustrator
- Malachi Leo Elliott (1886-1967), architect
- Phillip Eng, president of the Long Island Rail Road and general manager of the MBTA
- Jeffrey Epstein (1953–2019), financial advisor and convicted sex offender. Did not graduate.
- Mark Epstein, property developer, brother of Jeffrey Epstein.
- Mitch Epstein, photographer

== F ==
- Isidor Fankuchen (1905-1964), material scientist and solid-state physicist; pioneer of crystallography
- Adriana Farmiga, visual artist and Dean at Cooper Union School of Art
- Robert Feintuch, painter
- Joel H. Ferziger (1937–2004), mechanical engineer and expert in computational fluid dynamics
- Anthony Fiala (1869-1950), American explorer
- Irving Fierstein (1915–2009), painter, designer
- Liana Finck, cartoonist and author
- Israel F. Fischer (1858–1940), US Representative, judge
- James Fitzgerald (1851-1922), American jurist and politician
- Thom Fitzgerald, filmmaker
- Audrey Flack, pioneer of photorealism
- Max Fleischer (1883–1972), animator, inventor, film director and producer; co-creator of Betty Boop
- Mary Hallock Foote (1847–1938), author and illustrator
- Charles R. Forbes (1878–1952), politician and military officer; first Director of the US Veterans' Bureau
- Laura Ford, sculptor
- Felix Frankfurter (1882–1965), Associate Justice of the Supreme Court of the United States
- Brad Friedmutter, architect
- Martin Feinberg, chemical engineer and mathematician

== G ==
- Hope Gangloff, painter
- Janet Gardner, filmmaker
- Lenora Garfinkel (1930–2020), architect
- Paul Garrin, filmmaker
- Amy Gartrell, artist
- Louis D. Gibbs, lawyer, politician, judge
- Philip Gips (1931–2019), film poster artist
- Milton Glaser (1929–2020), graphic designer, creator of the I Love New York logo, co-founder of Push Pin Studios
- Harold S. Goldberg, electrical engineer; first chair of the IEEE
- Minetta Good (1895–1946), muralist, painter and printmaker
- Harry H. Goode (1909-1960), computer engineer and systems engineer; professor at the University of Michigan
- Aaron Goodelman, sculptor
- Sidney Gordin (1918–1996), visual artist, professor
- T.J. Gottesdiener, architect and manager of Skidmore, Owings & Merrill
- Harold Grad (1923-1986), applied mathematician
- Aaron Green (1917-2001), architect and protege of Frank Lloyd Wright; lecturer at Stanford University
- Charles Greenfield (1885-1979), engineer
- Leonard Gross, mathematician; Professor Emeritus of Mathematics at Cornell University

== H ==
- Hans Haacke, artist
- Dimitri Hadzi (1921–2006), sculptor
- William Harnett (1848–1892), painter
- Irving Harper (1916–2015), industrial designer
- Matthew Harrison, film director
- Sagi Haviv, partner, Chermayeff & Geismar; designer of the Library of Congress and Armani Exchange logos
- Palmer Hayden (1890–1973), artist famous for depictions of African-American life
- Dorothy E. Hayes (1935–2015), early Black graphic designer, educator, curator
- John Hejduk (1929–2000), one of New York Five, a group of five New York City architects
- Eva Hesse (1936–1970), sculptor
- Angela Hill, professional mixed martial arts fighter
- Edith Hillinger, mixed media artist, painter, founding member of second wave feminism
- Julian Hirsch (1922–2003), electrical engineer and audio critic
- Chuck Hoberman, winner of the Chrysler Design Award for Innovation and Design
- Kim Holleman, artist, MIT Media Lab Social Computing Group
- Emil Clemens Horst (1867–1940), inventor
- Sharon Horvath (born 1958), mixed media artist, painter, educator
- Shelby Hughes (1981–2014), artist and designer
- Russell Hulse, 1993 winner of the Nobel Prize in Physics
- Elizabeth Bullock Humphrey (1841–1889), illustrator

== I ==
- Alexander Isley, graphic designer

== J ==
- Francis Jehl (1860–1941), electrochemist and inventor
- Patty Jenkins, filmmaker
- Herman Jessor (1894-1990), architect and engineer
- Sandy Jimenez, comic book artist
- Bonnie E. John, cognitive psychologist
- Crockett Johnson (1906–1975), (David Johnson Leisk), comic strip artist and author of Harold and the Purple Crayon
- Willard F. Jones (1890–1967), naval architect, head of National Safety Council's marine section and Vice President of Gulf Oil
- Mimi Jung (born 1981), artist

== K ==
- Bob Kane (1915–1998), comic book artist and writer, creator of Batman
- Gideon Kanner, law professor, consultant, author, and lecturer
- Michael Kasha (1920–2013), physical chemist, educator, and guitar designer
- Alex Katz, figurative artist
- Luke A. Keenan (1872-1924), politician
- Arthur C. Keller (1901-1983), electrical engineer; pioneer of recording technologies
- Otto Kempner (1858-1914), lawyer, politician, and judge
- Owen M. Kiernan, member of the New York State Assembly
- Owen Kildare (1864-1911), realist writer
- Dave King, novelist and poet
- William King (1925–2015), artist
- R.B. Kitaj (1932–2007), painter
- Murray S. Klamkin (1921-2004), mathematician
- Vera Klement, professor at the University of Chicago
- Herman Charles Koenig (1893–1959), book collector, friend of H. P. Lovecraft
- Fred Kohler, inventor, author, and lecturer
- Lee Krasner (1908–1984), painter
- Kathleen Kucka, painter
- Heather Kulik, computational materials scientist and chemical engineer; professor at the Massachusetts Institute of Technology
- Moses Kunitz (1887-1978), biochemist
- Harvey Kurtzman (1924–1993), cartoonist, editor and co-founder of Mad

== L ==
- Lucien Marc Smith, American artist, designer, philanthropist, and restauranteur
- Lokanātha, Italian buddhist monk.
- Marisa Lago, attorney; Under Secretary of Commerce for International Trade
- Alfred A. Lama (1899–1984), New York State Assemblyman and co-sponsor of Mitchell-Lama housing legislation
- Thomas W. Lamb (1871–1942), architect and designer of theaters and cinemas
- Morgan Foster Larson (1882–1961), Governor of New Jersey, 1929–1932
- Benjamin Lax (1915-2015), solid-state and plasma physicist
- Joseph Lechleider (1933-2015), electrical engineer; inventor of DSL technology
- Aaron J. Levy (1881-1955), lawyer and politician
- Janet Cook Lewis, painter, librarian, and bookbinder
- Daniel Libeskind, architect for the reconstruction of the World Trade Center
- Whitfield Lovell, artist
- Herb Lubalin (1918–1981), graphic designer, creative director for publications Eros, Fact, and Avant Garde; designed the typeface ITC Avant Garde
- Samuel Lubkin (1906-1972), mathematician and computer scientist; pioneer in the early history of computing
- Marie Luhring Early woman truck designer in United States, first woman associate member of the American Society of Automotive Engineers
- Ellen Lupton, graphic designer, writer, curator and educator
- Wauhope Lynn (1856–1920), lawyer, judge, and politician
- Noah Lyon, artist

== M ==
- Jay Maisel, photographer
- Sylvia Plimack Mangold
- Fred Marcellino (1939–2001), illustrator
- Christian Marclay, artist, composer
- Judith Margolis, artist, essayist, book designer, curator
- Joseph Margulies (1896–1984), artist
- Jacob Marks (1861–1965), lawyer, New York State Senator, Municipal Court Justice
- Leonidas D. Marinelli (1906-1974), radiological physicist; founded the field of Human Radiobiology
- Leslie Martinez, artist, abstract painting
- Alexia Massalin, computer scientist and programmer
- Crystal McKenzie, designer
- Antonina Roll-Mecak, molecular biophyicist; Chief of the Unit of Cell Biology and Biophysics at the National Institutes of Health
- Linn Meyers, artist
- Abbott Miller, designer
- Mike Mills, filmmaker
- Matthew Monahan, sculptor
- A. Harry Moore (1877–1952), 39th Governor of New Jersey
- Toshiko Mori, architect
- Jacqueline Moss (1927–2005), art historian, educator
- P. Buckley Moss (1933-2024), artist
- Michel Mossessian, architect
- James H. Mulligan Jr. (1920–1996), American electrical engineer, former executive officer of National Academy of Engineering and president of IEEE
- Thomas Maurice Mulry (1855–1916), businessman and philanthropist
- Wangechi Mutu, artist
- Henry L. Myers (1862-1943), United States senator

== N ==
- Roy Nachum, Israeli New York-based contemporary artist
- Willa Nasatir (born 1990) BFA 2012, photographer, visual artist
- Victor Nellenbogen (1888–1959), architect
- Vera Neumann (1907–1993), artist known for colored linen patterns and scarves signed "Vera" by the Vera Company

== O ==
- Ella Seaver Owen (1852–1910), artist, teacher

== P ==
- Victor Papanek (1923–1998), designer and educator; early proponent of ecologically and socially responsible design
- Bruce Pasternack (1947–2021), engineer, author, and President and CEO of the Special Olympics
- Ruth Pastine, minimalist painter
- Randolph Perkins (1871-1936), Republican US Congressman
- Eleanore Pettersen (1916–2003), architect
- William Gardner Pfann (1917–1982), inventor and materials scientist; known for his development of zone melting
- Sylvia Plevritis, professor and chair of the Department of Biomedical Data Science at Stanford University
- Robert Plonsey (1924-2015), electrical engineer; Pfizer-Pratt Professor of Biomedical Engineering at Duke University; known for his work in Bioelectricity
- Ron Pompei, architect and founder of Pompei A.D.
- Charles E. Pont (1898–1971), painter, illustrator, printmaker, graphic designer
- Neal Pozner (1955–1994), artist, editor, writer and designer at DC Comics
- Seth Putterman, physicist

== R ==
- Grace Renzi (1922-2011), painter
- Andrea Robbins, artist and educator
- Morgan Robertson (1861-1915), American writer and self-proclaimed inventor of the periscope
- Frank E. Rom (1926-2012), NASA engineer
- Otto A. Rosalsky (1873-1936), lawyer and judge
- Fred Rosebury (1901-1999), engineer and artist
- Charles Rosen (1917–2002), engineer and pioneer in artificial intelligence in development of Shakey the Robot
- Morris Rosenfeld (1885–1968), maritime photographer
- Reynold Ruffins, graphic designer, co-founder of Push Pin Studios
- Jere F. Ryan (1882-1948), builder, businessman, and politician

== S ==
- Amy Sadao, Daniel Dietrich II Director of the Institute of Contemporary Art
- Augustus Saint-Gaudens (1848–1907), Beaux-Arts sculptor, numismatist, and educator
- Karen Sandler, lawyer
- Erik Sanko, marionette-maker and leader of the rock band Skeleton Key
- Alfred Sarant (1918–1979), engineer and Soviet spy
- Edward Sargent (1842–1914), architect
- Augusta Savage (Augusta Christine Fells) (1892-1962), sculptor and teacher
- Henry Scheffé (1907-1977), statistician; known for the Lehmann-Scheffe theorem and Scheffe's method
- Arnold Alfred Schmidt, painter
- Mischa Schwartz, professor of electrical engineering, Columbia University
- Richard Schwartz, engineer, shared the 2019 Queen Elizabeth Prize for Engineering for design and development of the first GPS satellites.
- Sy Schulman (1926–2012), civil engineer and planner, Mayor of White Plains, New York (1993–1997)
- Ricardo Scofidio, with Elizabeth Diller, the first architects to win a MacArthur Prize, co-founder of Diller Scofidio + Renfro
- Samuel R. Scottron (1841–1908), engineer and inventor, grandfather of entertainer Lena Horne
- Georgette Seabrooke (1916–2011), muralist, artist, art therapist and educator
- George Segal (1924–2000), Pop Art sculptor and painter
- Emily McGary Selinger (1848–1927), painter, writer, poet, educator
- Joan Semmel (born 1932), feminist painter; winner of numerous awards including include the Women's Caucus for Art Lifetime Achievement Award (2013)
- Nathan Silver (1936-2025), architect and architecture critic
- Redmond Simonsen (1942–2005), graphic artist and game designer at the wargame company Simulations Publications, Inc.
- Neal Slavin, photographer
- John L. Smith (1889–1950), chemist, pharmaceutical executive, and co-owner of the Brooklyn Dodgers
- Zak Smith, artist
- Charles B.J. Snyder (1860–1945), chief architect and Superintendent of School Buildings, New York City Board of Education, 1891–1923
- Edward Sorel, graphic designer, co-founder of Push Pin Studios
- Helen Sheldon Jacobs Smillie (1854–1926), painter
- Mark A. Stamaty, cartoonist and children's writer and illustrator
- Edwin King Stodola (1914–1992), radio engineer; chief scientist on Project Diana, which bounced radio waves off the moon for the first time in 1946
- Thaddeus Strassberger, opera director
- William Sulzer (1863-1941), 39th governor of New York
- Eric E. Sumner (1923–1993), engineer, inventor, and scientist; contributor to the early development of switching systems

== T ==
- Philip Taaffe, painter
- Gemma Taccogna (1923–2007) Italian-born visual artist known for papier-mâché and ceramics
- Katharine Lamb Tait (1895–1981), artist
- Nina Tandon, bioengineer and educator
- Paul Thek (1933-1988), painter, sculptor, and installation artist
- Adah Belle Thoms (1870-1943), founder of the National Association of Colored Graduate Nurses
- Maximilian Toch (1864–1946), chemist, manufacturer, educator, and early pioneer of art forensics
- Hy Turkin (1915–1955), sportswriter and editor of the first baseball encyclopedia

== U ==
- Andrea U'Ren, children's book author and illustrator

== V ==
- Jaret Vadera, artist
- Stan Vanderbeek (1927–1984), animator
- Henry Earle Vaughan (1912-1978), electrical engineer
- Richard Velazquez, Honda and Porsche car designer
- Allyson Vieira, artist
- Jovan Karlo Villalba, painter
- Harold Van Buren Voorhis (1894-1983), chemist

== W ==
- Louis Waldman (1892–1982), engineer, labor lawyer, a founding member of the Social Democratic Federation
- Annie E. A. Walker (1855–1929), portrait artist, one of the first African-American women to complete an institutional art education in the US
- Edward J. Wasp (1923–2015), chemical and environmental engineer, pioneer of slurry pipelines
- Adolph Alexander Weinman (1870–1952), sculptor
- Joseph Weber (1919-2000), American physicist
- Tom Wesselmann (1931–2004), painter
- Pennerton West (1913–1965), painter
- Alice Wetterlund, comedian
- Jack Whitten (1939–2018), painter
- Christopher Wilmarth (1943–1987), sculptor
- Jerome Witkin, painter
- Joel-Peter Witkin, fine art photographer
- Dan Witz, painter, street artist
- Tobi Wong (1974–2010), designer, artist
- Caroline Woolard, artist
- Sarah A. Worden Lloyd (1855-1918), painter, art instructor

== Y ==
- Jackie Yi-Ru Ying, chemical engineer, nanotechnology scientist, and educator
- Prabda Yoon, writer
