= Annie Walker =

Annie Walker may refer to:

- Annie E. A. Walker (1855–1929), American artist
- Annie Louisa Walker (1836–1907), English Canadian teacher and author
- Annie Purcell Sedgwick (1871–1950), later Annie Walker, Scottish chemist
- Annie Walker (Coronation Street), a character from the British television series Coronation Street
- Annie Walker, a main character from the American television series Covert Affairs
- Annie Walker, character in Bridesmaids (2011 film)

== See also ==
- Anne Walker (disambiguation)
