= Rosebury =

Rosebury is a surname. Notable people with the surname include:

- Brett Rosebury (born 1980), Australian rules football field umpire
- Fred Rosebury (1901–1999), American engineer
- Theodor Rosebury (1904–1976), American bacteriologist

== See also ==
- Rosebery (disambiguation)
