= Anna Walker =

Anna Walker may refer to:

- Anna Walker (civil servant), British civil servant and regulator
- Anna Walker (television presenter) (born 1962), English television presenter
- Anna Maria Walker (1778–1852), Scottish botanist
- Anna Louisa Walker (1836–1907), English and Canadian teacher and author

== See also ==
- Ann Walker (disambiguation)
