= Elizabeth Sher =

American filmmaker and artist

- Born: 1943 (age 81–82); Washington, D.C., United States
- Education: University of California, Berkeley, San Francisco Art Institute, Smith College
- Known for: Documentary, short films, mixed-media art, artist books
- Awards: American Film Institute, National Endowment for the Arts,
- Website: Elizabeth Sher / I.V. Studios

Elizabeth Sher, Juggling, 16 mm film still, 1982. Pictured: Sue Mutant.

Elizabeth Sher (born 1943) is an American visual artist, known for eclectic short films, documentaries about women, art, aging and health, and mixed-media artwork employing digital and analog modes. Her films combine humor, honesty and an interest in everyday experiences; while not strictly autobiographical, her work often explores issues that parallel her own life cycle. The San Francisco Examiner described her early short films as "witty combinations" of music and imagery, formal experimentation, clever editing and rewarding interviews, "infused with arch satire"; Amalia Mesa-Bains wrote that her documentaries create "that special mix of common sense, irony and human insight [that] inspires us to talk more, laugh a lot and trust each other." Sher's films have screened at the Kennedy Center and the London, Edinburgh, Hong Kong and Raindance international film festivals, and been broadcast on PBS and public television networks throughout the world; they have been recognized with awards from the American Film Institute, National Education Media Arts Fest, and the Mill Valley and Bare Bones International film festivals, among others. Her art has been exhibited internationally and belongs to the public collections including the San Francisco Museum of Modern Art and Berkeley Art Museum and Pacific Film Archive (BAM/PFA). Sher lives and works in Oakland, California and exhibits with the collective, Mercury 20 Gallery.

== Early life and education ==
Elizabeth Sher was born and raised in Washington, D.C. She attended Smith College before studying at the San Francisco Art Institute and University of California, Berkeley where she earned a BA (1964) and an MA in Painting and Printmaking (1967). She was influenced by Bay Area Figurative artists Elmer Bischoff and Gordon Cook, who encouraged her interest in art that reaches viewers in a clear, direct way, but has often noted the lack of female mentors in that era.

In the 1970s, Sher built a reputation as a printmaker and painter with complex prints and mixed-media works noted for their technical virtuosity, rich surfaces, dynamic compositions and sense of light. She drew particular attention (and a San Francisco Art Festival award) for her "Rope" series, a largely abstract body of work that explored the formal and expressive possibilities of rope and incorporated photography, etching, serigraphy, collage, gestural drawing and painting, and sculptural elements. Artweek wrote that she "transform[ed] a common object and its idiomatic associations into evocative visual metaphor."

Elizabeth Sher, from "Rope" series, mixed media on paper, 1979.

In 1979, Sher began teaching drawing and painting at California College of the Arts (CCA). By that time, she had become disillusioned with the art-world/gallery system and began to explore technology and 16mm film, seeking a less hierarchical and proscribed form of expression that might reach a wider audience and include humor. While she continued to make art, her public career focused on film and video over the next three decades, produced through the company she founded in 1979, I. V. Studios. During that period, she continued to teach art at CCA until retiring as Professor of Art Emerita in 2011.

== Work ==
Despite apparent differences, Sher's two main areas of work—mixed-media art and films and videos—share a process-based approach involving framing and editing. She cites multimedia artists Lynn Hershman Leeson, William Kentridge and Bruce Conner as influential for their movement between still and moving images. Sher's film themes center on women, art and healthy aging—sometimes in conjunction—and have been noted for their humor and comic timing, feminist slant, and insight. Her themes loosely pace the decades and challenges of her own life: adolescence, motherhood (30s), menopause and marriage (40s and 50s), aging (60s), health and full living (70s).

=== Short films ===
Sher's first film, The Training (1979), set the course for much of her future work, combining humor, common experiences and pointed observation; the deadpan, black-and-white work—which blends Army training footage and scenes shot in her home—was inspired by a militaristic manual on toilet training she received and tried. In the rock-video spoof Too Young to Date (1981) and Pearls (1984), Sher explored prepubescent sexuality and fantasy; the manic, serio-comic Juggling (1981) features punk rocker Sue Mutant as a beleaguered artist/housewife struggling to balance career, marriage and motherhood.

In the early 1980s, Sher turned to the more populist (and affordable) video format, often packaging works together in a fast-paced program called I. V. Magazine. The San Francisco Examiner and others noted the subversive and eclectic quality of its pop-culture vignettes, commercial parodies, cringe humor and critique, and experimental color graphics, as well as the value of its matter-of-fact, unadorned people profiles. I. V. Magazine's subjects ranged from a painterly, salsa-scored trip through a car wash in a low-rider (Wash It) to arcade games (Beat It), a punk-rock scored look at dog shows (Famous Dogs), and kiddie beauty pageants (Be a Winner); the Kansas City Star compared its depictions of fringe culture to the work of Diane Arbus.

Sher's videos also focused on gender relations and women's work. Check Up (1984) is a feminist send-up of mid-life gynecological exams—insensitive male doctors and all; My Mom's a Cop (1984), portrays a woman's empowering and invigorating career change from French teacher to policewoman. Two videos examine sexuality: the funny-sad Community Service (1984) offers an inside view of phone sex work, while Celluloid Seduction (1991) is an early examination of the issue of consent. A later satire, Stalls (2004), attacks the gender inequality of public restroom access, offering creative strategies for women to beat long lines. In addition to short films, Sher produced, directed and edited the independent feature, Just Another Weekend (1989), a Christmas-set comedy that explored the phases of love relationships—from dating to mature accommodation—through three couples.

=== Documentary films ===
Sher often pursues documentary subjects based on her own personal challenges, as in the award-winning Approaching the 14th Moon (1993), which examines the "silent passage" of menopause. Critics describe it as "unexpectedly entertaining, charming and affirming," dramatic and offbeat in its presentation of information and the personal, intimate insights of more than forty diverse women. 14th Moon led to a companion work, When Women Go Through Menopause, Where Do Men Go? (1996), which combined Mal Sharpe's humorous man-in-the-street interviews, information, cartoons, and frank and hopeful discussions with men about the effects of menopause on relationships and their own (largely hidden) concerns about aging and sexuality, empty-nest syndrome and retirement.

Elizabeth Sher, Younger Thinner Smoother, video still, 2001.

With Younger Thinner Smoother (2000), Sher seriously explored and poked fun at her Baby Boomer generation's fear of aging and the parallel growth of the plastic surgery industry. Reviewers write that the film "deftly skewers American's obsession with cosmetic surgery," while contextualizing the trend socially and historically; Sher enlivens a potentially uncomfortable subject with cartoons, sound effects, a Twilight Zone-like dream sequence and cleverly edited old movie clips, in addition to candid interviews with regular people (herself included) and explorations of Botox parties and "surgery vacations." Her later film, Rituals of Remembrance: Exploring the Art of Mourning (2016 with Maggie Simpson Adams), has been described as a heartening "meditation on processing loss through celebration, closure, and community," which explores Victorian era, Mexican Dia de Muertos, and American DIY mourning practices.

In the 2000s, Sher created several portraits of women, offering audiences the role models she lacked in her youth. Alma’s Jazzy Marriage (2004, with Mal and Sandra Sharpe) recalled the colorful life of the strong-willed Alma Foster, jazz enthusiast and wife of influential bassist George "Pops" Foster, from early days with Louis Armstrong in New Orleans, through the Golden Age in Harlem to later life and jazz in San Francisco. Her intimate and affectionate Bella Bella (2007) weaves art, romance and health in a portrait of Bay Area septuagenarian sculptor Bella Feldman as she moves forward and continues taking risks after her husband's death, amid unfolding health problems and a new transatlantic relationship. The multi-award-winning Penny (2014) focuses on internationally renowned criminal defense attorney, feminist, LGBT activist and collector of women's art, Penny Cooper (known as "champion of the marginalized"), who was at the center of some of the last half-century's most profound social changes.

Sher has also created portraits of artist and feminist Edith Hillinger, chef Weezie Mott, artist Carmen Lomas Garza, dancer-choreographer Margaret Jenkins, and teacher, interpreter trainer and deaf comic, Evelyn Zola, among others.

Elizabeth Sher, Filtered View #1, mixed media, 2019.

=== Later art and artist books ===
In the 2000s, Sher renewed her interest in exhibiting artwork, spurred in part by new opportunities to combine digital and hand-made modes in works on paper, canvas and metal, and artist books. Her later work examines place and the environment, as well as the roles of perception, sight and memory, and the construction of narrative in human understanding. She often focuses strongly on materials and process, as in the show "Crossing the Digital Divide" (2016), which featured mixed-media images that moved back and forth through various hand-made and digital manipulations. Her 2011 artist book, Blog, consists of a box containing a large, Torah-like scroll, filled with daily automatic writing in a self-devised alphabet that has been compared visually to Chinese.

Much of Sher's later work is inspired by artist residencies abroad, during which she accumulates small drawings and paintings, photographs and video that serve as source material upon return. Her show, "Morocco: Seen and Unseen" (2019), filtered North African culture through her experience as a visitor, pairing local colors and tourist-themed photos (camels, mosques) with wooden screens suggesting mashrabiyas—"harem windows" used to for privacy and shielding from male gazes (e.g., Filtered View #1). Sher's artist books, Nuggets (2009), 7 Days in Otranto (2015) and Snow Lines (2018) arose, respectively, out of residencies in New Zealand, Italy and Iceland, where the loss of snow on glaciers inspired her work.

== Awards and public recognition ==
Sher has received Roy Dean Film and Fleishhacker Foundation Small Arts grants and awards from the Anheuser-Busch and Harris foundations, Pacific Pioneer Documentary Fund, and National Endowment for the Arts/American Film Institute Fellowship Fund for her film work. She has won awards from numerous film festivals, including Mill Valley and Intendence (Penny, 2015), Bare Bones International (Younger Thinner Smoother, 2001), and the National Education Media Arts Fest (Approaching the 14th Moon, 1994).

Sher has been awarded artist residencies from Green Olive Arts (Morocco, 2018) Gullkistan Residency (Iceland, 2016, 2012), BAU Institute (Italy, 2014), Can Serrat (Barcelona, 2010) and New Pacific Studio (New Zealand, 2008). Her art belongs to the public collections of the San Francisco Museum of Modern Art, BAM/PFA, Fine Arts Museums of San Francisco, Austin Museum of Art, Oakland Museum of California, San Jose Museum of Art, and U.S. Embassy, among others.

== Selected director filmography ==
All works video unless noted.

| Title | Year | Time | Notes |
| Edith Hillinger: Collaging Culture | 2019 | 18 min. | |
| Weezie Mott: Still Cookin' | 2019 | 19 min. | Directed with Maggie Simpson Adams |
| Rituals of Remembrance | 2017 | 30 min. | Directed with Maggie Simpson Adams |
| Penny | 2014 | 30 min. | |
| Bella Bella | 2007 | 26 min. | |
| Stalls | 2004 | 3 min. | Made with Maggie Simpson Adams |
| Alma’s Jazzy Marriage | 2004 | 26 min. | Made with Mal and Sandra Sharpe |
| Younger, Thinner, Smoother | 2001 | 51 min. | |
| Men Are From the Moon | 1998 | 5 min. | |
| Homenje a Tenachtitlan - dia de las Meurtas installation by Carmen Lomas Garza | 1997 | 24 min. | |
| When Women Go Through Menopause, Where Do Men Go? | 1996 | 56 min. | |
| The Master-Mentor Series | 1995 | 18 min. | 3-part documentary series |
| Fingers That Tickle & Delight | 1994 | 32 min. | |
| Bella Bella | 2007 | 26 min. | |
| Approaching the 14h Moon | 1993 | 52 min. | |
| Celluloid Seduction | 1991 | 11 min. | |
| Just Another Weekend (feature) | 1989 | 26 min. | |
| Dancing on the Edge of Success | 1988 | 28 min. | |
| I. V. Magazine | 1984–6 | 60 min. | Annual magazine format program |
| Juggling | 1981 | 14 min. | 16 mm film |
| Too Young to Date | 1980 | 4 min. | 16 mm film |
| Wash It | 1980 | 6 min. | 16 mm film |
| Beat It | 1980 | 5 min. | 16 mm film |
| The Training | 1979 | 9 min. | 16 mm film, b/w |
