= Roseberry (surname) =

Roseberry or Rosebery is a surname. Notable individuals with this name include:

- Arthur Rosebery (1904–1986), English musician
- Mike Roseberry (born 1966), English cricketer
- Andrew Roseberry (born 1971), English cricketer
- Daniel Roseberry (born 1985), American fashion designer
- David Roseberry (born 1955), American Anglican priest

== See also ==
- Earl of Rosebery
- Roseberry Briggs
