= Anne Walker =

Ann or Anne Walker may refer to:

- Ann Walker (1803–1854), Yorkshire landowner, partner of Anne Lister
- Ann B. Walker (1923–2025), American journalist and radio host
- Anne Walker (architectural historian) (born 1973), American architectural historian and author
- Anne Walker (artist) (born 1933), American painter and printmaker
- Anne Walker (astronomer) (1863–1940), British astronomer
- Anne Weightman Walker (1844–1932), American philanthropist
- F. Ann Walker (1940–2022), American chemist

== See also ==
- Annie Walker (disambiguation)
- Anna Walker (disambiguation)
- Walker (surname)
