= Fred Kohler (disambiguation) =

Fred Kohler (1888–1938) was an American actor.

Fred Kohler may also refer to:

- Fred Kohler (wrestling promoter) (1903–1969), American professional wrestling promoter
- Fred Kohler (author) (born 1920), German-born American inventor, author, and lecturer
- Fred Kohler (politician) (1864–1934), mayor of Cleveland, Ohio
- Fred Kohler Jr. (1911–1993), American actor

== See also ==
- Frederick Koehler (born 1975), American actor
