= Branimir Ivan Sikic =

American physician

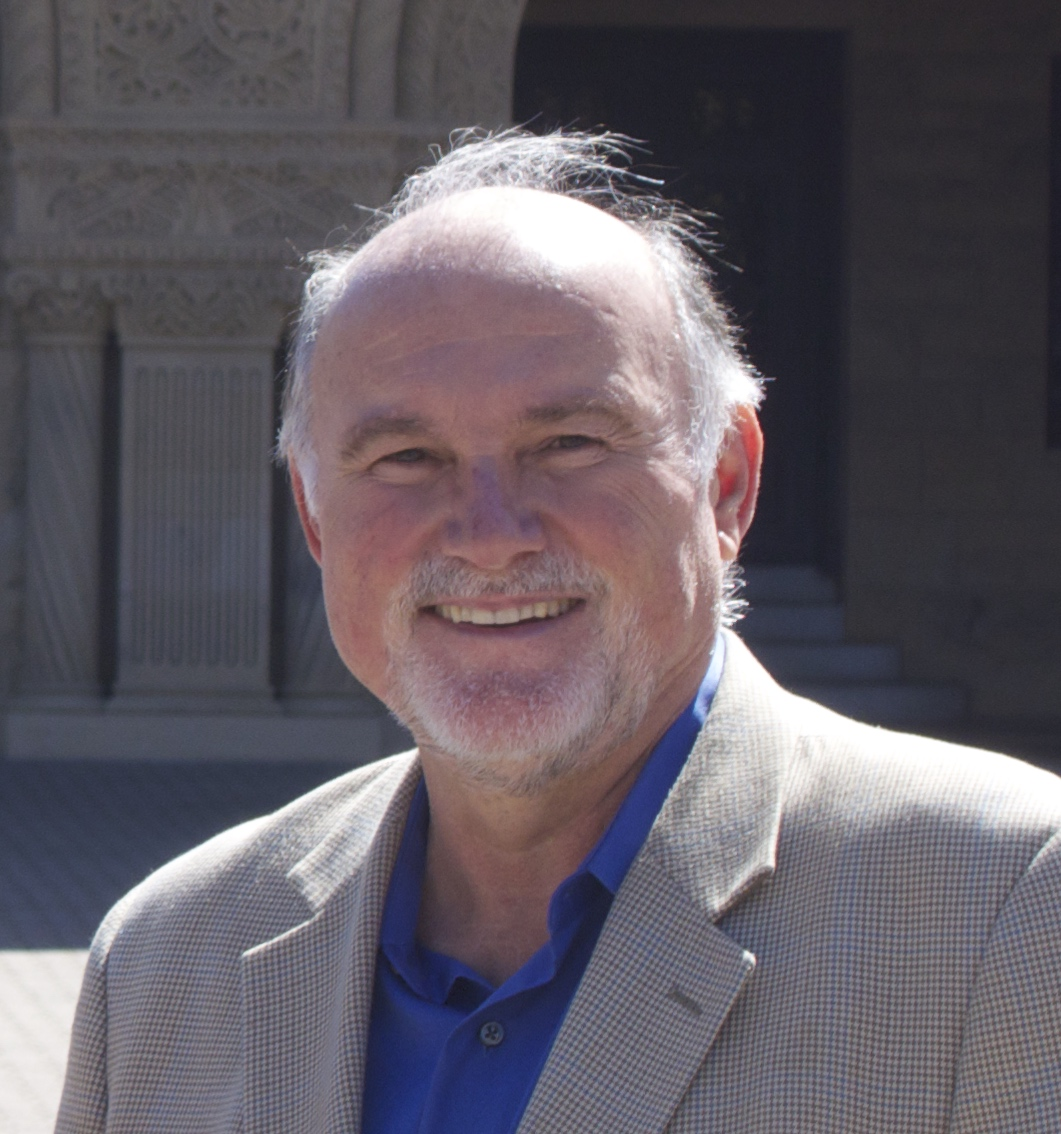
Branimir I. Sikic

Branimir Ivan "Brandy" Sikic (born October 18, 1947) is an American medical doctor and scientist at Stanford University School of Medicine. He is an oncologist and cancer pharmacologist, and has served as a faculty member at Stanford University since 1979. His research spans basic, translational, and clinical research and investigates the mechanisms of drug resistance and the development of new anticancer therapies.

== Early life ==
Sikic was born in Graz, Austria, on October 18, 1947. His parents were refugees from Croatia, his father a mathematician and his mother a linguist. The family emigrated to Adelaide, Australia in 1949, and to Cincinnati, Ohio in 1956. Sikic graduated from St. Xavier High School as president of his class in 1964 at age 16, and attended Georgetown University in Washington, D.C., where he obtained a B.S. degree in biology in 1968.

== Education and training ==
Sikic attended the University of Chicago Pritzker School of Medicine, graduating with an M.D. in 1972. He returned to Georgetown University Hospital in Washington, D.C. for an internship and residency in internal medicine (1972-5). From 1975 to 1978 he was a postdoctoral laboratory research fellow at the National Institutes of Health (NIH), working on the regulation of drug metabolism and the pharmacology and pulmonary toxicology of the anticancer drug bleomycin. He returned to Georgetown in 1978–9 to complete a clinical fellowship in medical oncology, prior to joining the faculty at Stanford University.

== Honors and awards ==
In 1992 Sikic began directing the Stanford University General Clinical Research Center and then the Center for Clinical and Translational Research in 2008. He is the founder and director of the Central European Oncology Congress held in Opatija, Croatia from 1998 to 2022. On January 9, 2010, he was awarded the Katarina Zrinska Medal for Science and Medicine by the President of Croatia.In 2025, Sikic was awarded an honorary doctoral degree (Ph.D., honoris causa) by the University of Zagreb, for his contributions to science and medicine in Croatia. He was the 114th person so honored in the past 117 years, including Nikola Tesla, Margaret Thatcher, and William Perry.

== Contributions to science ==
=== Mechanisms and regulation of multidrug resistance ===
Sikic has made significant contributions to understanding the biology and clinical significance of multidrug resistance (MDR), particularly the P-glycoprotein (P-gp) multidrug transporter and regulation of the ABCB1 gene. He discovered that deletion of aa335 changes the drug-binding spectrum and is integral to the pharmacophore of P-gp. He also defined specific sites of transactivation of ABCB1, and mechanisms of amplification of the gene.

=== Clinical trials of modulation of multidrug resistance ===
The laboratory work on drug resistance mechanisms led to a series of clinical Phase I-III trials that defined this field. Early on, Sikic's group found that P-gp inhibition resulted in significant pharmacokinetic alterations of several anticancer drugs, with the potential for markedly increased toxicities unless doses were adjusted. These findings, and the co-existence of other resistance mechanisms in human cancers, redefined the field and demonstrated the limited clinical utility of MDR modulation.

=== Cancer genomics ===
The Sikic group utilized gene expression profiling and systems biology to yield insight into cancer taxonomy and prognostic and predictive signatures for cancer therapies. With their colleagues Olivier Gevaert and Sylvia Plevritis, they have identified driver genes for ovarian cancers.

== See also ==
- SPECTRUM: Clinical & Translational Research Unit
- Cancer Molecular Therapeutics Research Association (CMTRA)
