= Rosebery =

Rosebery or Roseberry may refer to:

== Places ==
=== Australia ===
- Rosebery, New South Wales
- Rosebery, Northern Territory
- Rosebery, Tasmania
- Rosebery, Victoria

=== Elsewhere ===
- Rosebery, British Columbia, Canada
- Roseberry, Missouri, an extinct hamlet in Nodaway County
- Roseberry Topping, a hill in North Yorkshire, England

== Other uses ==
- Earl of Rosebery, a title in the Peerage of Scotland
  - Archibald Primrose, 5th Earl of Rosebery (1847–1929), British prime minister
    - Hannah Primrose, Countess of Rosebery (1851–1890), his wife
- Roseberry College, in County Durham, England
- Rosebery Park, a football ground in the Oatlands area of Glasgow, Scotland
- Rosebery School for Girls, in Epsom, Surrey, England
- Villa Rosebery, an official residence of the President of Italy

== See also ==
- Roseberry (surname)
