= Jane Panetta =

American curator and art historian

Jane Panetta is a New York-based curator and art historian. Panetta is currently an associate curator at the Whitney Museum of American Art.

== Career ==
=== Curating ===
Before working at the Whitney, Panetta spent five years in the Painting and Sculpture Department of the Museum of Modern Art, New York as a curatorial assistant, where she was involved with MoMA's 2007 Richard Serra retrospective and the 2009 retrospective on the Belgian artist James Ensor. The Whitney Museum hired Panetta in 2010 as a Curatorial Researcher. She worked her way up to assistant curator followed by an appointment as associate curator in 2015. At the Whitney, she was part of the curatorial team that curated the 2015 show: “America Is Hard to See,” the museum's first collection show at its new home in the Meatpacking District. Also with the Whitney, Panetta organized “Fast Forward: Painting from the 1980s (2017)” and “Mirror Cells,” with Christopher Y. Lew, the co-curator of the 2017 Whitney Biennial. She has also curated solo presentations by Willa Nasatir and MacArthur Genius awardee Njideka Akunyili Crosby.

Panetta curated the 2019 Whitney Biennial with Rujeko Hockley. In selecting the 75 artists for the show, Panetta and Hockley selected predominantly minority, female artists who live and work on the West or East Coast of the United States, among other commonalities. When asked about their selections towards younger artists of color, the curators explained that they found other common threads in the struggles among artists today including "a sense of urgent financial and professional struggle due to college debt, real-estate development, and gentrification."

=== Writing and academia ===
Panetta contributed to a survey book on James Ensor, published by MoMA in 2009 to accompany an exhibit at the museum. In the early 2010s, Panetta wrote frequently for publications Art in America and Modern Painters.

Alongside her curatorial work, she is also an adjunct faculty member at Parsons The New School for Design.

She received a bachelor's degree in history from Haverford College and a master's degree in art history from CUNY, Hunter College. As of 2015, Panetta was working to complete her PhD, with a focus on modern and contemporary sculpture, at The Graduate Center, CUNY.

Panetta is a member of Madison Square Park’s Public Art Consortium.
