= Kim Holleman =

American artist

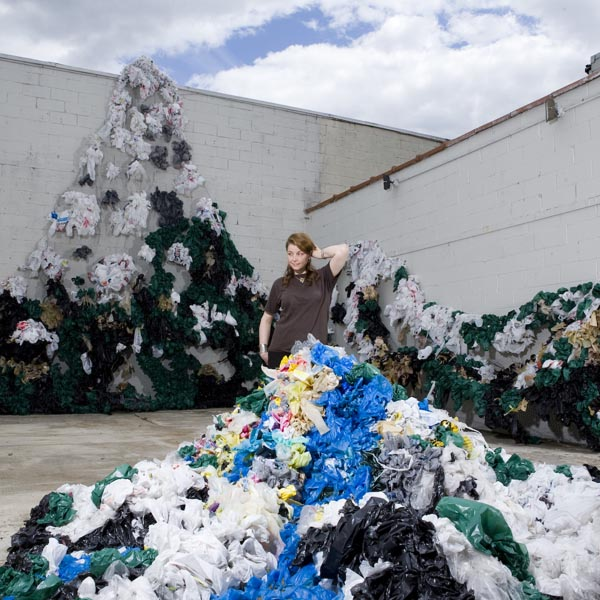

Kim Holleman (born in Tampa, Florida) is NY-based, mid-career contemporary artist. Holleman was a Research Affiliate at MIT Media Lab with the Social Computing Group (2014–17), and a Visiting Scholar (2013–14). Kim Holleman is an interdisciplinary artist, using an approach which includes: Contemporary Art, Interior Architecture, Public Art, Installation, and Landscape Design. She attended The Cooper Union in New York City and Gerrit Rietveld Academie in Amsterdam, the Netherlands. She also spent time at Bet Za'lel Academy of Art in Jerusalem, Israel as an undergraduate exchange student. Holleman has been located in Bushwick, Brooklyn since 2000. Holleman continues to mount exhibitions and public art projects in New York and lectures, teaches, and works with multi-disciplinary teams.

== Biography ==
Kim Holleman was born in Tampa, Florida and was raised in Palm Beach County. Both of her grandfathers worked for or on NASA projects at the onset of the Space Program. Holleman credits this as a major influence on her focus on science and society in her work, namely the confluence of nature, art, architecture and engineering. Holleman's work is, "inspired by the complexities of the design in nature and the environment".

== Art ==
Kim Holleman is an alumna of Cooper Union. "Holleman’s work addresses concepts of utopia and dystopia, utilitarianism, environmentalism, and ideas about creating utopian architectures for "a better world".

Holleman's interdisciplinary approach has been recognized across fields. Kim Holleman has given a TEDx Talk on her work. TEDxCOOPER UNION. Her work was featured in a New York Times Feature, in print and online. Holleman's first solo show in New York,"Law of the Land" was R.C. Baker’s pic for Best In Show- The Village Voice (2008)

Notable group exhibitions include: Ideas City at The New Museum of Contemporary Art, Circa: 2012 at White Box, Law of the Land at Black and White Gallery, BMW Guggenheim Lab Screenings (2011), Museum of (Un)Natural History at Work Gallery (2011), Bushwick Biennial NurtureArt (2009) A Sense of Place The Boulder Museum of Contemporary Art (2004), and Utopia at The John Michael Kohler Arts Center (2006). Her most notable work, Trailer Park: A Mobile Public Park was shown in a group show at The Storefront for Art and Architecture (2006), The New Museum (2012), and Central Park (2018), among others.

Holleman's work has been featured in Art in America, The New York Times, The METRO, L Magazine, and other media. Her solo show, The Artificial Homemaker at The Rietveld Pavilion, an all-glass show space in Amsterdam, was filmed for the documentary De Cultuurshok: Foreign Artists in Amsterdam that aired on Dutch National Television in the Netherlands that year.

== Notable works ==
Holleman's work of public art, Trailer Park: A Mobile Public Park, at The New Museum at Ideas City, May 2013. Version 1 of "Trailer Park" is a mobile public park, built into a mobile Coachmen Travel Trailer with skylights allowing the entrance of rain and air. Version 2, "Trailer Parklet" is a mobile public park built into a ramp-back V-nose construction trailer, featuring a pond, trees, flowers, plants, curvilinear planters and benched seating. Trailer Parks can be parked at any curb, and is a completely street legal, living public park.

Trailer Park: Mobile Public Park, debuted at the Storefront for Art and Architecture (2006) and has since shown in many locations around New York. Since its first showing at The Storefront For Art and Architecture, Trailer Park has shown in Chelsea, at Sculpture Center in Long Island City, The Lower East Side, The Cooper Union, DUMBO at Pearl Street Triangle, The Supreme Court at Foley Square and more.

Trailer Park: Mobile Public Park has been featured in The New York Times 10/20/2012, pg A20, and online: To Flourish, Nature Park Doesn’t Put Down Roots. Trailer Park continues to evolve as a community based project in New York.
