= Robert Feintuch =

American painter

Robert Feintuch (born January 3, 1953 in Jersey City, New Jersey, U.S) is an American painter who lives and works in New York City.

In his work, Feintuch “uses the body to pursue psychologically suggestive meanings,” and in many of his paintings he has used himself as a model. In their combination of the “sublime with the banal, the serious and the ridiculous,” Feintuch’s paintings have been consistently seen as both comic and rooted in psychological life.

== Life ==
Robert Feintuch was born in 1953 in Jersey City, New Jersey, and raised in Levittown, Pennsylvania. He moved to New York in 1970 to study at Cooper Union, and graduated with a Bachelor of Fine Arts degree in 1974. He graduated with a Master of Fine Arts degree from Yale University School of Art in New Haven, Connecticut in 1976.

Feintuch began to exhibit in galleries in the mid-1980s, and his work has been shown in galleries and museums in the United States and Europe.

== Early Work: Abstract and Ear Paintings ==
Trained as an abstract painter in the 1970s, when minimalism was a dominant way of working, Feintuch made a slow and gradual transition towards painting figuratively. His first solo exhibition in New York in 1988 included abstract paintings with broad expanses of color, alongside paintings of ears isolated on black fields. In his subsequent solo exhibition at Daniel Newburg Gallery in 1992, Feintuch exhibited large-scale black paintings, all containing life-sized images of ears, and he continued to work exclusively in black and white until 1996.

== Figurative Paintings ==
In the early 1990s, Feintuch began working from objects he had in the studio. His 1996 exhibition at CRG Gallery was titled “The Middle Ages” and it included black and white paintings of mundane objects like buckets, clocks, and ladders, juxtaposed with life-sized paintings of suits of armor.

Having worked with body fragments, including ears and arms, since the 1980s, Feintuch started to use himself as a model in the mid-90s, and he simultaneously returned to working in full color. Shortly after, he started a series of paintings of clouds, and clouds began to show up as a suggestive and ongoing metaphoric motif in his figure paintings, as in his 2013 painting, entitled Feet Up.

Feet Up, 2013, combines parts of the artist’s body with clouds in an image that “conjures Gothic renderings of heaven and the slapstick of “Tom and Jerry” cartoons.”

== Critical reception ==
In the catalogue for an exhibition of the Sonnabend Collection at the Serralves Foundation, Suzanne Cotter said that “Feintuch’s work embraces a kind of productive ambiguity…he uses the tension between the heroic, eternal quality of mythological figures and themes of mundane quotidian life to reinterpret myth '...figuring and reliving it with deadpan theatricality, almost to the point of farce.’"

Other writers have remarked on relationships between Feintuch’s work and slapstick, seeing in the paintings a presentation of self, that in its “mix of heroism and humiliation (or myth and cartoon),” is both vulnerable and comic.

“’Cro-Magnon Bacchus’” is the title given…to the portrait of an unathletic, rather ectomorphic, hen-breasted type (whose) club dangles down like a languid phallus.”

“…if Mr. Feintuch is a cynic about human nature — or the making of art, or the nature of truth, or the possibility of beauty — he is, fortunately, almost as funny as Diogenes.”

“These works wrestle with the debilitations and humiliations mortality imposes on us, but also with the possibility of grace, which we find in beauty and in hope.”

Often seen as addressing painterly concerns, many writers have remarked on the unusual luminosity of his paintings: “Feintuch’s a terrific painter, whatever the subject. These paintings glow.”

== Awards and Grants ==
2008: Guggenheim Fellowship

2003: Leube Foundation, Residency Fellowship

1999: Bogliasco, Residency Fellowship

1996: Rockefeller Foundation, Residency Fellowship

1977: National Endowment for the Arts

1974: Sarah Hewitt Memorial Prize for Painting
