= Matthew Monahan =

American contemporary artist

Matthew Monahan (born 1972) is an American contemporary artist based in Los Angeles. He works in a variety of artistic disciplines that incorporate mixed media and found objects such as "foam, folded and crumbled construction paper," glass vitrines, and drywall. His work references art history and literature, recalling the works of modernists such as Constantin Brancusi and Marcel Duchamp. His sculptures and installations often combine modernist references with figurative "fragments of ancient, mainly Greco-Roman statues."

Monahan graduated from Cooper Union School of Art in 1994 with a BFA and the De Ateliers in Amsterdam from 1994 to 1996. Monahan has been a prominent member of a new generation of artists in Los Angeles "that includes Aaron Curry, Thomas Houseago, Elliott Hundley, and Lara Schnitger among its cohort." In 2007, the Museum of Contemporary Art, Los Angeles mounted a solo exhibit of the artist's work accompanied by a catalog titled, Matthew Monahan: Five Years, Ten Years, Maybe Never. The Nasher Sculpture Center in Dallas, Texas acquired six of the artist's sculptures in 2022, which were shown in a solo exhibition titled, Matthew Monahan: Recent Acquisitions, in May, 2023.

Monahan has shown his sculptures at other various galleries, collections, and museums, including the Chinese European Art Center in Xiamen, Bureau Stedelijk in Amsterdam, The National Center for Art in St. Petersburg, Russia, the Royal Academy and the Saatchi Gallery in London, and Museum Boijmans Van Beuningen, The Stedelijk Museum and the Fries Museum, all in the Netherlands.
