= Frank E. Rom =

Engineer

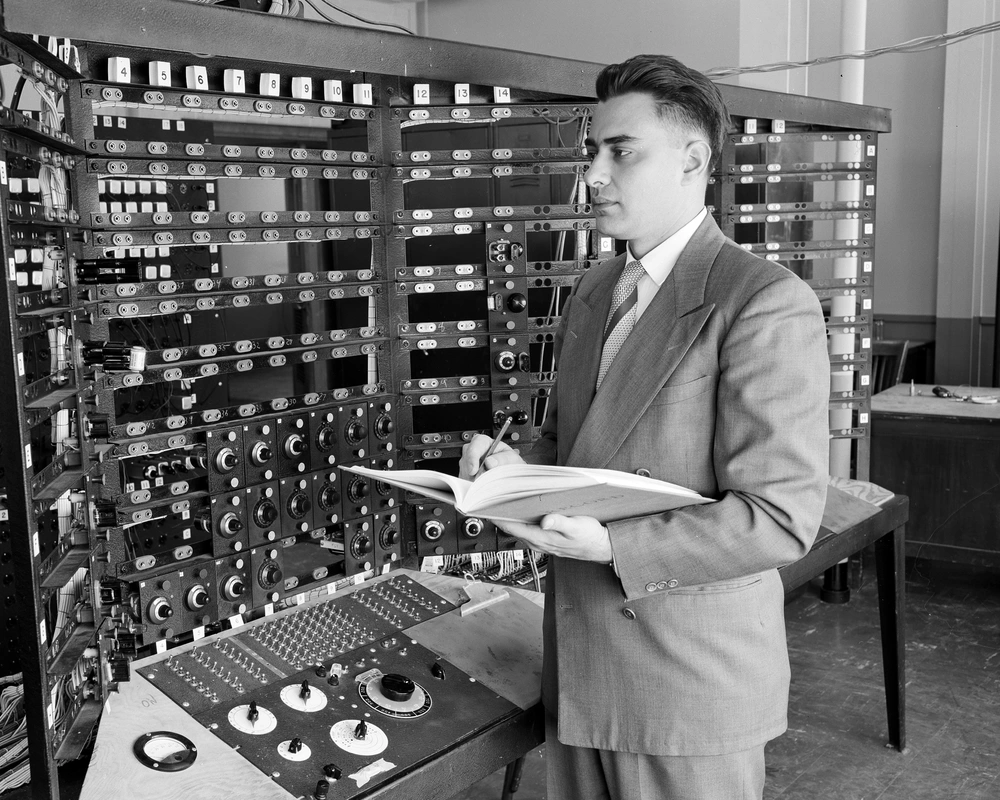
- In 1957
- Born: August 16, 1926; Brooklyn, New York
- Died: November 4, 2012 (aged 86); Venice, Florida
- Resting place: Epiphany Cathedral Memorial Rose Garden, Venice, Florida
- Education: Cornell University
- Occupation: Engineer: National Aeronautics and Space Administration
- Spouse: Marilyn McNamara
- Children: 7

Frank Ernest Rom Sr. was an engineer who worked for the National Advisory Committee for Aeronautics (NACA) and it successor, the National Air and Space Administration (NASA). He wrote many papers on the uses of nuclear propulsion for rockets for interplanetary travel. In the 1970s, he was involved in NASA's exploration of solar, wind and tidal energy sources as alternative to fossil fuels, and found his own solar energy company, Rom-Aire Solar Energy Products, based on his patents for air-based solar heating and collecting systems.

== Early life ==
Frank Ernest Rom Sr. was born in Brooklyn, New York on August 16, 1926, the son of Frank and Josefa Rom, a pair of immigrants from Austria. He was educated in public schools in New York City, and attended Cooper Union there. During World War II, he served in the US Navy. After the war he entered Cornell University, from which he graduated both bachelor's and master's degrees.

== NASA ==
In 1948, Rom joined the National Advisory Committee for Aeronautics (NACA) Lewis Research Center in Cleveland, Ohio, where he met his future wife, Marilyn McNamara. They had seven children. His early work there was on the development of long-range aircraft, powered by jet engines and turboprop engines. He then became involved in the Aircraft Nuclear Propulsion project. He was one of the first to consider the possibility of a nuclear-powered ramjet missile, writing a paper on it in 1954. He became an important figure in the development of NASA's Plum Brook Reactor facility in Sandusky, Ohio.

Rom studied the use of nuclear propulsion systems for crewed interplanetary rockets, becoming the chief of the Nuclear Propulsion Concepts Branch at Lewis, and assisted the Los Alamos Scientific Laboratory with Project Rover, its development of a nuclear rocket engine. His work covered all aspects of nuclear propulsion from fissile materials to nuclear reactor design and nuclear waste. and was Lewis's point of contact for its materials, fuel element research, and hydrogen heat transfer technologies. He produced many papers on nuclear rockets., and was the first to the propose the design, and demonstrate the feasibility, of a tungsten-based gas-core nuclear reactor, a type that would be especially suitable for interplanetary exploratory missions, such as a mission to Mars. He also proposed the development of a nuclear-powered hovercraft.

== Solar energy ==
After the nuclear rocket design work at Lewis dried up, Rom became involved in NASA's exploration of solar, wind and tidal energy sources as alternative to fossil fuels, and found his own solar energy company, Rom-Aire Solar Energy Products, based on his patents for air-based solar heating and collecting systems.

== Death ==
Rom died in Venice, Florida, on November 4, 2012, and was interred in the Memorial Rose Garden of the Epiphany Cathedral in Venice, where he was an active member.
