= E. Miriam Coyrière =

British-born American businesswoman

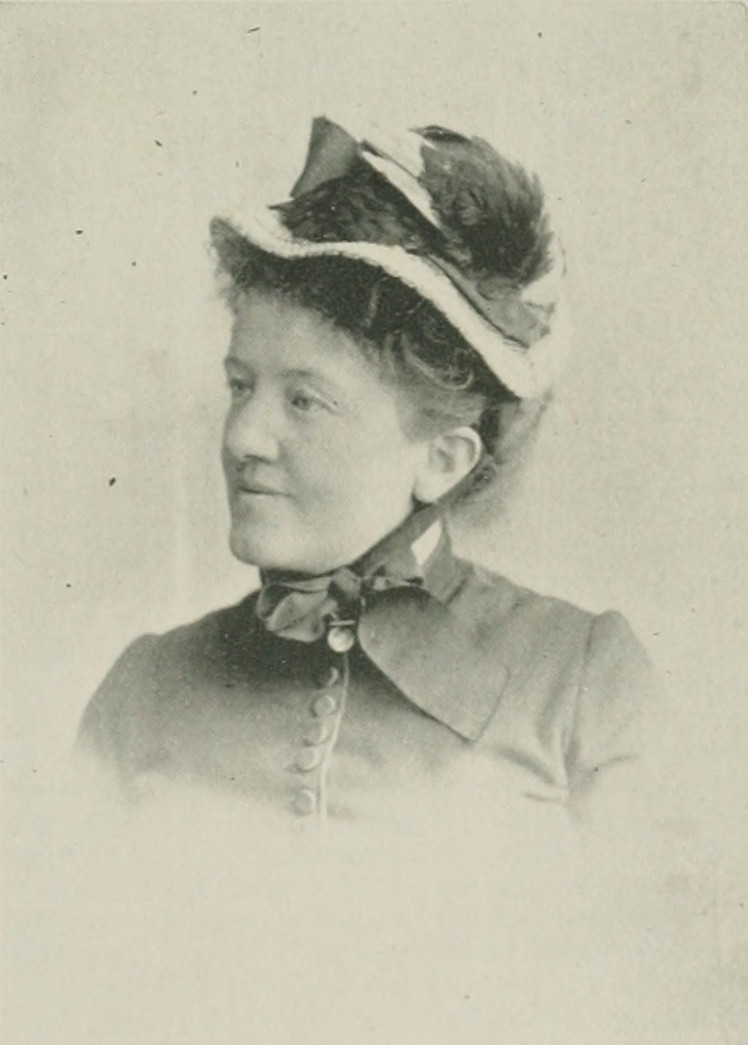
- Born: E. Miriam Coyriere; London, England
- Education: Cooper Institute
- Occupations: Teacher, businesswoman
- Known for: E. Miriam Coyriere Teachers' Agency
- Spouse: Carlos Pardo (m. 1884)
- Children: 1

E. Miriam Coyrière was a businesswoman, the founder in 1880 of the E. Miriam Coyriere Teachers' Agency in Manhattan.

== Early life ==
E. Miriam Coyrière was born in London, England, when her parents were traveling and visiting relatives there. She was of English ancestry, the Hopkins family on her father's side, who settled in New England and were prominent in the history of the Colonies, and on her mother's side the Archer family, at one time the owners of Fordham Manor, in Westchester County, New York. Lord John Archer received the letters patent on the estate in November 1671. The manor was mortgaged in 1686 to Cornelius Van Steenwyk, a New York merchant, and he left it by will to the Dutch Church of New York. On her mother's side, the families had been Episcopalians since the establishment of the Episcopal Church in England; on her father's side, they belonged to the same church for over one hundred years.

Coyrière inherited literary talent from her mother, who was both a poet and artist. Her father, who was wealthy at the time of his marriage, was a talented and highly educated man, and he turned his attainments to account when his fortune was swept away. He was a fine linguist and an author. Coyriere belonged to a family of six children.

== Career ==
E. Miriam Coyrière was a member of the National Education Association, of the Woman's Health Association and of other organizations.

Aided by Peter Cooper, she became a teacher after a course of study at the Cooper Institute. After teaching for a time, she learned the school furniture business. In 1880, she opened the "E. Miriam Coyriere Teachers' Agency" at 150 Fifth Avenue, Manhattan, that earned a worldwide reputation. She worked diligently to build it up and succeeded. She supplied teachers for every grade of educational institution, from colleges down to district schools, and her patrons were in every State of the Union and Canada, in Central America, Mexico and South America, and she supplied teachers for European institutions as well.

In 1884, she displayed furniture and school apparatus at the International Congress in Rio de Janeiro, Brazil, where she won a diploma.

== Personal life ==
Coyrière's first marriage was unfortunate. Her husband failed, and her parents died and left their three young sons to the care of her sister and her. To add to her labor, her first husband became an invalid from paralysis. Her only son died in infancy.

Coyrière's second husband was Professor Carlos Pardo, a writer on pedagogy, whom she married in 1884. Both were members of the American Association of Science, and Coyrière, who kept her business name, E. Miriam Coyriere, was interested in all the reform movements of the time. Their home was a center of intellectual activity.
