= Leslie Martinez =

American visual artist working in abstract painting

- Born: 1985 (age 40–41); McAllen, Texas
- Education: Cooper Union (BFA); Yale School of Art (MFA)
- Known for: Abstract painting
- Awards: United States Latinx Art Forum’s Latinx Artist Fellowship

Leslie Martinez (born 1985, McAllen, Texas) is a visual artist working primarily with abstract painting. Martinez's textured compositions complicate the use of color in art history to touch on issues of gender, queerness, migration, citizenship, and identity. The artist lives and works in Dallas, Texas.

== Early life and education ==
Leslie Martinez was born in the Rio Grande Valley of the South Texas-Mexico border, precisely between the cities of La Grulla and La Victoria, and raised in Dallas, Texas, where the artist currently lives and work. Martinez has a twin sister, and while at school, they attended an arts magnet high school using their childhood bedroom as a studio at the time.

Martinez holds an MFA from Yale School of Art (2018), New Haven, and a BFA from Cooper Union for the Advancement of Science and Art (2008), New York.

== Work ==
Leslie Martinez was an Artist-in-Residence between 2018-2019 at the Museum of Contemporary Art Tucson, Arizona, where they started experimenting with larger canvases.

Martinez solo exhibition Century in Strata was on view at the Commonwealth and Council, in Los Angeles over summer 2023. In a recent interview, Martinez mentions Borderlands/La Frontera: The New Mestiza, the work of writer and queer theorist Gloria E. Anzaldúa as influential to her artistic development.

The Blaffer Art Museum at the University of Houston, presented Leslie Martinez: The Secrecy of Water in 2023. The paintings in this solo presentation addressed periods of severe drought in Texas state and other United States regions in 2022 as well as the emotional burden caused by the political climate around border control.

In 2023, the MoMA PS1, in Queens, presented Leslie Martinez: The Fault of Formation, the artist's first major institutional solo exhibition in New York. The show featured recent paintings and three large-scale works commissioned by the museum for this multi-gallery presentation. The paintings pallet, and the newly created body of work in the PS1 show, relate to the CMYK color model (Cyan, Magenta, Yellow, and Black) often used by the artist in their abstract compositions. The exhibition was organized by Costa Rican curator Elena Ketelsen González and it was on view until spring 2024. In conjunction with the exhibition, Leslie Martinez sat down in conversation with writer and critic Raquel Gutiérrez, author of Brown Neon (2022), for a public program.

The Speed Art Museum presented the two-person show Current Speed: Angel Otero/Leslie Martinez, in 2023. Martinez presented their work alongside fellow abstract painter and Puerto Rican-born contemporary artist Angel Otero.

=== Awards ===
In 2022, the artist was granted a United States Latinx Art Forum’s Latinx Artist Fellowship.

=== Artistic practice ===
Martinez's abstract and large-scale paintings incorporate nontraditional materials such as towels, cloths, used clothing, and even ashes to comment on border crossing issues, geographies, and gender identity. Their color schemes often reference the CMYK color model (Cyan, Magenta, Yellow, and Black).

== Collections ==
The work of Leslie Martinez is in the collections of Pérez Art Museum Miami, Florida; Dallas Museum of Art, Texas; High Museum of Art, Atlanta; and the Speed Art Museum, Louisville; Los Angeles County Museum of Art, California; the Whitney Museum of American Art, New York.
