= Crystal McKenzie =

Crystal G. McKenzie (August 29, 1950 - October 28, 2021) was a designer and president of Crystal McKenzie, Inc. A graduate of the Cooper Union, she also studied at the Universita Cattolica di Milano. McKenzie was married to Brian Jones. She was named the US Chamber of Commerce's "Woman Business Owner of the Year" in 1983.
