= Guy Coheleach =

American wildlife artist (born 1933)

Guy Coheleach is an American wildlife artist. His paintings have been in 41 one-man retrospective exhibitions in major museums in 36 cities from New York to Los Angeles from 1991 to 2011. Along with over a hundred one-man commercial shows worldwide, his work has also been exhibited in the National Collection of Fine Art, the Royal Ontario Museum, the White House, Washington D.C.'s Corcoran Gallery, the Norton Gallery and the Newark Museum.

== Early life and education ==
Coheleach (pronounced KO-lee-ak) was born in New York City in 1933.

He grew up at Baldwin, Long Island, one of nine children. He began drawing around age ten. He was fascinated by the wildlife in the area including Jones Beach and Baldwin Bay. He studied gulls, and other waterfowl. He also collected snakes, and kept them in the family's basement.

He attended Bishop Loughlin High School in Brooklyn, N.Y. He won a scholarship to Cooper Union School of Art in New York City. He served in the Korean War as the SP-2 for the 65th Combat Engineers attached to the 25th Infantry Division. Much later, he received an honorary Doctor of Arts from William and Mary.

== Career ==
=== Commercial art ===
After graduating from Cooper Union, he began a career in commercial art. This ranged from illustrating mail order catalogs to designing candy boxes.

=== Wildlife painting ===
The National Wildlife Federation annually produced promotional stamps with the images of birds, animals, plants, trees, and fish. It was popular nationwide. Coheleach created four animal paintings, and submitted them for possible conservation stamps. The organization's art editor, Roger Tory Peterson, accepted two of them, and commissioned more.

In the years that followed, he won many wildlife art awards, successfully sold prints and books of his work, and traveled across the world studying wildlife.

His first trip to Africa was accomplished as a result of winning his division in the 1966 Winchester National Trap and Skeet Championship and he has returned to Africa five times a year since then. PBS featured him and his work in Africa entitled Journeys of an Artist. He was also the subject of two films: Guy Coheleach and the Bald Eagle and Quest: An Artist and His Prey. In addition, he has been the focus of articles in Reader's Digest, Saturday Evening Post, National Wildlife Magazine, and Audubon, as well as many other regional art and wildlife magazines.

Visiting heads of state have received his American Eagle print, and he was the first Western artist to exhibit in Beijing after World War II. Coheleach became a charter member of The World Wildlife Fund's "The 1001: A Nature Trust" in 1972. His endowment at the University of Tennessee provides about six full scholarships to the School of Wildlife Management each year.

== Awards ==
His paintings have received the Society of Animal Artists' Award of Excellence an extraordinary eight times, and he was awarded the prestigious Master Artist Medal from the Leigh Yawkey Woodson Art Museum in 1983. In 2012 he received a Lifetime Achievement Award from the Society of Animal Artists.

The Big Cats: The Paintings of Guy Coheleach by Abrams was a Book of the Month Club selection in 1982. Both it and his Coheleach: Master of the Wild are out of print. Guy Coheleach's Animal Art by DDR Publishing is still available. His highly acclaimed book The African Lion as Man-Eater was published in 2004. Coheleach's text in this book is embellished by over 100 of his paintings.

== Books of Guy Coheleach's works ==
- The Big Cats: The Paintings of Guy Coheleach. Text by Nancy A. Neff. New York: Harry Abrams, 1982. Abradale 1986.
- Coheleach: Masters of the Wild. Text by Terry Wieland. Camden, South Carolina: Briar Patch Press, 1990.
- Guy Coheleach's Animal Art. Text by Terry Wieland. Cleveland, Ohio: DDR Publishing, 1994.
- The African Lion As Man-Eater by Guy Coheleach [S.l.]: Panther Press, 2003. (ISBN 978-0-9746991-0-3)
