= Katherine M. Ball =

American educator

Katherine (Kate) Madeline Ball (4 Jan 1859 - 13 Mar 1952) was an American educator, particularly known for her work on Asian art.

== Biography ==
Ball was born in Reading, Pennsylvania to Henry and Carolyn Diehl Ball. She trained at the Cooper Union Art School in New York City. In the early 1880s she taught art at Winona Normal School. She moved to Omaha, Nebraska, in 1888, and worked with the Omaha Public Schools as writing and drawing teacher and art supervisor. She was involved in the formation of the Western Art Association and was its Secretary from 1888. She moved to the San Francisco Bay Area in the mid-1890s, and was a drawing teacher and art supervisor there until 1924. She was also known for her public lectures on Japanese prints: she gave lectures in San Francisco and a gave a series of lectures at the Imperial Hotel, Tokyo, in 1908. She visited Japan several times, her last visit being in 1936. She died in San Francisco, aged 93, and is remembered at the Chapel of the Chimes Columbarium and Mausoleum, Oakland.

=== Publications ===
- Decorative Motifs of Oriental Art (London: John Lane; New York: Dodd, Mead and Co, 1927; republished 1969)
- Animal Motifs in Asian Art: An Illustrated Guide to their Meanings and Aesthetics (republished 2004)
- Bamboo, Its Cult and Culture: Paintings by Wang Tseng-Tzu, imperial prince painter / interpretative text and art analysis by Katherine M. Ball (Berkeley, Calif.: The Gillick Press, 1945)
- Paper Folding and Cutting; A Series of Foldings and Cuttings Especially Adapted to Kindergartens and Public Schools (republished several times, eg Isha Books, 2013. ISBN 9789332862067)
