= Ron Pompei =

American designer

Ron Pompei is an American designer born in Washington, D.C.. Trained as an artist, sculptor, and designer. He received a Bachelor of Architecture from the Cooper Union in New York and a B.A. in Fine Arts from the Philadelphia College of Art and studied Industrial Design at Pratt Institute.

== Career ==
He began his journey as an artist, creating light art installations and sculptures that Philadelphia magazine cited as “changing the face of Philadelphia." He taught design at Drexel University in Philadelphia in the mid-1970s. In 1990, Pompei co-founded Pompei A.D., a creative services firm based in New York City, where he serves as principal and creative director. the firm has collaborated with Anthropologie, California Academy of Sciences, Coca-Cola, Fortune, Harley-Davidson, Herman Miller, Kiehl's, Kmart, Levi's, MTV, Old Navy, Rubin Museum of Art, Sony, Té Casan, The Discovery Channel, UCLA Neuropsychiatric Institute, and Urban Outfitters.

== Work ==
Pompei's work is based on his design philosophy, C3: Commerce, Culture, and Community. This integration is at the heart of the idea of the “transformative environment,” a running theme throughout Pompei's work. His approach earned him a spot in Mavericks at Work, a book by Fast Company co-founder William C. Taylor and longtime editor Polly LaBarre, about the "most original minds in business."
