= Judith Margolis =

Israel-based American painter, book artist and writer

- Born: Judith Cohen; September 24, 1944 (age 81); New York City, New York, United States
- Known for: Painter

Judith Margolis (born September 24, 1944) is an Israel-based American artist working visually in paintings, drawings, artist's books and multi-media collages. In her art and writing she "explores tensions between consciousness, feminism, and religious ritual tradition".

== Early life ==
Margolis was born into a Jewish family and Yiddish-speaking community in the Bronx, NY. In 1948 her family moved to suburban New Jersey, from which the adolescent Margolis would adventure to New York City for her early artistic education.

== Early artistic training ==
Margolis began her artistic training during high school at age 15 with a drawing class at The Art Students League, then attended Cooper Union, where she met her first husband Albie Tabackman. The two traveled across the United States to California, where they lived at Magic Forest Farm in Oregon. Margolis also studied at Lone Mountain College in San Francisco, and has an MFA (1986) from the University of Southern California.

== Travels ==
Margolis spent an Orthodox Jewish life in San Francisco, Los Angeles and Israel before leaving her orthodoxy. Since leaving orthodoxy, she has been gradually finding a balance between her religious learning and retrieval of the freedoms that she believes are important for her art.

== Career ==
Since 1998, Margolis has been the Art Editor of Nashim: The Journal of Jewish Women's Studies and Gender Issues, published by Indiana University Press.

She was selected as one of ten international Common Ground artists.

Margolis is Creative Director of Bright Idea Books, which produces limited edition and artist's books.

Margolis wrote and illustrated the prayer book Life Support; Invitation to Prayer.

In 2015 she was co-curator for the Jerusalem Biennale, presenting the Women of the Book exhibition in which women artists offered their own interpretations of the weekly divisions of the bible.

== Education ==
- MFA from University of Southern California, 1986
- BA from Lone Mountain College, SF, CA 1977
- Two years study at Cooper Union, NY, 1962–64
- Additional studies Columbia University, NY

== Notable works ==
Life Support: Invitation to Prayer, Penn State University Press (2019)

Countdown to Perfection:Meditations on the Sefirot. Limited edition fine art unbound book contained in an individual, linen clad, oyster box. (2009)

The Underground Dreams of a Cactus, Limited edition hand painted etching, mono-print cover. (1983)

== Family ==
Judith's second husband, the author David Margolis, died on July 17, 2005. She has three children and six grandchildren.

== Exhibitions ==
=== One person exhibitions ===
- Hebrew Union College, New York, New York. 2009
- Hebrew Union College, Los Angeles, California. 2008
- University of Southern California, Los Angeles, California. 2003
- Yeshiva University Museum, New York, New York. 2002
- Brandeis Bardin Institute . Simi Valley, California. 2000
- Talpiot Industrial Gallery . Jerusalem. 1994
- ARTernatives Gallery . San Luis Obispo, California. 1989
- University Of Southern California . Los Angeles. 1986
- Buffalo Street Gallery . Ithaca, New York. 1988
- Smedley's Gallery . Ithaca, New York. 1981
- Eisenhower College Gallery . Seneca Falls, New York. 1978
- Ithaca House Gallery . Ithaca, New York. 1978
- Cole/Hayes Gallery . San Francisco. 1977

=== Two person exhibitions ===
- University of Judaism (now the American Jewish University) / Platt Gallery . Los Angeles . (scheduled) 1999
- Ithaca House Gallery . Ithaca, New York. 1981

=== Selected group exhibitions ===
- Women of the Book First Station, Jerusalem, Israel (2015)
- Jerusalem Biennial 2015
- “Gathering Sparks,” (2014) Mizel Museum, Denver, CO
- “Find Common Ground” (2008) Huan Tie Art Museum, Beijing China
- Anlasslich des 125. Geburtstages von Hermann Hesse” (2002) KunstKeller Gallery, Annaberg, German
- Florida Atlantic University. Boca Raton, Florida. 2000
- University of Arizona Museum of Art. Tucson, Arizona. 2000
- Kutztown University Gallery. 1999
- Plains Art Museum. Fargo, North Dakota. 1998
- Morris Louis Gallery/Bezelel. Jerusalem. 1998
- B'nai B'rith National Jewish Museum. Washington, District of Columbia . 1997
- Central Exhibition Hall. Moscow. 1996
- Kerim Institute, Jerusalem. 1996
- Kanner Heritage Museum. Toronto, Canada. 1996
- Skirball Cultural Center. Los Angeles. 1996
- Navon Gallery. Neve Ilan, Israel. 1995
- Plotkin Judaica Museum. Phoenix, Arizona. 1995
- The Knesset. Jerusalem. 1994
- Arad Art Museum. Arad, Israel. 1994
- Yeshiva University Museum. NYC. 1993
- Perkins Gallery. Boston. 1993
- Dubin-Wolf Exhibit Center. Los Angeles. 1992
- Loyola University Laband Gallery. Los Angeles. 1991
- UCLA Kirkham Gallery Los Angeles. 1991
- Aishet Chayil (traveled between 1990 and 1998), opened at Yeshiva University Museum NYC and closed at Bezalel Gallery, Jerusalem, Israel.
- Dubin-Wolf Exhibit Center. Los Angeles. 1989
- The Art Store. Los Angeles. 1987
- University of Wisconsin Fine Art Gallery. Milwaukee. 1987
- Arts Commission Gallery. Los Angeles. 1987
- Otis/Parsons Gallery. Los Angeles. 1984
- Amfac Plaza Gallery. Honolulu. 1984
- Herbert Johnson Museum. Ithaca, New York. 1983
- Columbia-Greene Community College. New York. 1983
- Arnot Art Museum. Elmira, New York. 1983
- Rockefeller Arts Center. Fredonia, New York. 1983
- Schenectady Museum. New York. 1983
- At Home, Long Beach Museum. California. 1983
- Rutgers University Art Museum. New Brunswick, New Jersey . 1981
- Traction Gallery. Los Angeles. 1981
- Tompkins-Cortland Community College . New York . 1981
- Arnot Museum. Elmira, New York . 1981
- Zone Gallery. Springfield, Massachusetts. 1981
- Womanworks Gallery . Buffalo, New York. 1981
- Ithaca House Gallery . Ithaca, New York. 1981
- Los Angeles Institute of Contemporary Art. 1979
- Hinckley Foundation Museum . Ithaca, New York. 1979
- AART Gallery. Oakland, California. 1979
- State University of New York Art Gallery. Binghamton. 1978
- Cornell University Art Gallery. Ithaca, New York . 1978
- Lone Mountain College Art Gallery. San Francisco, California. 1977

== Collections ==
=== New York ===
- New York Public Library Special Collections
- Dr. Al Molvadan
- Meredith Tax
- Barbara Rochman
- Liza Norman
- Dr. Phyllis Silverman
- Janet Braun-Reinitz

=== Seattle ===
- University of Washington Rare Book Collection

=== Jerusalem ===
- Seth Althotz
- Dani and Deborah Kollin
- Rabbi Daniel Landes and Sheryl Robbin
- Timna Katz
- LSusan Schneider
- Eli and Miriam Avidan
- Drs. Jeff and Jane Kimchi
- Ephraim and Sigal Tabackman
- Rabbi Joel and Donna Zeff

=== Tel Aviv ===
- Dan and Penny Witties
- Dr. Jim and Diane Breivis
- Drs. Cody and Lucy Fisher
- Annette and Steve Hess

=== San Diego, California ===
- Noa Summerfield
- Jean Diamond Sargent

=== Los Angeles ===
- Midway Hospital Medical Center
- Hebrew Union College Skirball Museum
- UCLA Fine Arts Library
- Beverly Hills Fine Arts Library
- Uri Harkham
- Nancy Berman
- Robert J. Avrech
- James and Sonya Cummings
- Mark Carliner
- Michelle Rappaport
- Blossom Norman
- Dr. Robert and Peggy Sloves
- Phillip and Judith Miller
- Barbara Schuster
- Diane Isaacs Fink
- Abby Yasgar and Joey Lipner
- Adam Leipzig and Lori Zimmerman
- Drs. Suzanne and Moshe Spira
- Dr. Deborah Berger
- Drs. Donna Cooper-Matchett & Bill Matchett
- Lynn and Morton Moskowitz

=== Moscow ===
- Artist's House, Chilushskinskaya

=== Berkeley, California ===
- UC Berkeley Fine Arts Library

=== Boca Raton, Florida ===
- Arthur Jaffe Center for Rare Books

=== Baltimore ===
- John and Linda Haas

=== Ithaca, New York ===
- Tompkins County Hospital
- Fredrika and Bill Kaven
- Myra Malkin
- Catherine O'Neill
- Linda Myers
- Sandra Gittleman
- Robert and Corinne Stern
- Ira and Anne Brous
- Moorehead, Mn
- Minnesota State University

== Faculty appointments, residencies and awards ==
- Coolidge Colloquium Research Fellowship; 2010
- 18th Street Arts Center, Santa Monica, CA; 2008, 2009
- Hebrew Union College, Los Angeles, CA; 2008
- Brandeis-Bardein College Institute (LA), Faculty; 1999-00
- International Plein-Air Printmaking Grant, Chelushkinskaya, Russia (1996)
- International Plein-Air Printmaking Residency Grant, Fargo ND (1998)
- International Plein-Air, Artist-in-Residence; Morehead, MN; 1998
- Brandeis-Bardein College Institute (LA), Faculty; 1997
- Chomut, Christina, TODAY'S LOCAL NEWS, "Space Visions", January 30, 2005
- International Plein-Air, Artist-in-Residence, Moscow; 1996
- Arad Arts Project (Israel), Artist-in-Residence; 1993–94
- Center for Jewish Culture and Creativity, Project Grant; 1993–94
- UCLA Extension, Instructor, Drawing/Painting/Book design; 1990–93
- University of Southern California (LA), Instructor, Painting/Design; 1984–89
- University of Judaism (LA), Instructor Painting/Drawing/Book Design; 1990–91
- Brandeis-Bardein College Institute (LA), Faculty; 1988–90
- Woman's Studio Workshop (NY), Artist-in-Residence/Project grant; 1983 During this residency, Margolis created The underground dreams of cactus, an handmade artit's book in an edition of 20. The book documents a post-modern woman's experience. Sixteen etchings incorporating images and handwritten text explore the perils of living in a body-conscious, sex conscious world.
- Cornell Council on the Arts (NY), Project grant; Ithaca, 1983
