= Anne Walker (artist) =

American painter and printmaker (born 1933)

- Born: September 20, 1933 (age 92); Boston, Massachusetts, U.S.
- Education: Smith College
- Known for: Printmaking and painting
- Style: Oil, pastel, and watercolor
- Elected: An elected member of Allied Artists of America
- Website: anne-walker.fr

Anne Walker (born September 20, 1933) is an American artist and contemplative thinker, primarily known for printmaking and painting. In 2001, Walker was named a Chevalier de L'Ordre des Arts et Lettres by French Minister of Culture Catherine Tasca. Walker lives and works in Paris and has exhibited widely in France, Belgium, Germany, Switzerland, Sweden, Australia, and the United States.

== Early life and education ==
Walker was born in Boston, Massachusetts, in 1933. Walker graduated in 1955 from Smith College. She spent her junior year in Paris, working at the Académie de la Grande Chaumière in Montparnasse. In 1956, she returned to Paris to study with Johnny Friedlaender at his atelier; her first etchings were done there as well.

== Career ==
Walker continued to make prints, create etchings, and a number of fine-press books in Paris. To date, she has made more than 330 prints, as well as a number of fine-press books illustrated with etchings. Since the 1960s Walker has been participating in group, collective, and solo exhibitions in France and abroad. In Paris, she has been involved in the Salon de Mai, the Salon de la Jeune Gravure Contemporaine and the Salon d'Automne, of which she was a member for a time.

In 1986 Walker took up painting, using gouache combined with pastel, a technique that has predominated in her work since then. With these materials she began exploring the format of the artist’s book, which has allowed her to collaborate with poets and writers whom she admires, including Michel Butor, Kenneth Koch and Peter Davison, to name a few. Much of her book work is concerned with the language of color and is characterized by a lyricism that pairs well with literature.

Walker also illustrated single-copy, or very limited edition books, and worked on "painted books" over texts by writers such as Bernard Noël, Jean Cortot, Henry David Thoreau, Charles Baudelaire, Walt Whitman, Arthur Rimbaud and Eugène Guillevic. Her solo exhibition Anne Walker: Painted Books at the Boston Athenaeum in 2003 featured handwritten poems by an impressive roster of writers: Emily Dickinson, Percy Bysshe Shelley, and others, including the artist herself and one of her major collectors and collaborators, Edward Kessler. A major exhibition in 2005 Poetics of Color: Books by Anne Walker featured thirty-two artist's books–likened to poetic jewel boxes–which she donated to the Mortimer Rare Book Collection at Smith College on the occasion of her 50th college reunion. Walker’s work has continued to be recognized in both group and solo exhibitions in France, Belgium, Germany, Switzerland, Sweden, Australia and the United States and her painted books have been acquired by major libraries and museums in those countries.

== Personal life ==
Walker and her husband, Bertrand Dorny who is also an artist, have two children, both professionally engaged in publishing.

== Awards ==
On December 11, 2001 Catherine Tasca, the French Minister of Culture, made Anne Walker-Dorny a Chevalier de L'Ordre des Arts et Lettres in recognition of her creation in the artistic domain and her contribution to culture in France and in the world.

== Exhibitions ==
=== Collective exhibitions ===
- 1960 Boston Printmakers
- 1971 Cracow Biennale
- 1975-1976 Toulon International Festival
- 1980 Biennale d'Art Contemporain, Brest
- 1981 Grass and Tree ( Herbe et Arbre) at the Centre Culturel, Montbéliard
- 1982 Salon de la Gravure, Montrouge
- 1984 and 1994 Handmade Books ( Livres 'A Mano') at the Galerie Biren, Paris
- 1990 6th Biennale de l'Estampe, Sarcelles
- 1990 Poetry in a Garden ( La Poésie dans un Jardin), a traveling exhibition shown in Nantes, Nîmes and Avignon
- 1990 Texts and Images ( Textes et Images) at the National Library of Luxembourg
- 2001 What Is an Artist's Book? ( Qu'est-ce qu'un Livre d'Artiste?) at the Médiathèque, Issy-les-Moulineaux

=== Solo exhibitions ===
- 1972 Galerie La Pochade, Paris
- 1979 Galerie Biren, Paris
- 1979 Gallery of Graphic Arts, New York
- 1983 and 1992 Librairie-Galerie J. Matarasso, Nice
- 1997 Galerie Mantoux-Gignac, Paris
- 2003 Anne Walker: Painted Books at the Boston Athenaeum, Boston

=== Recent collective and solo exhibitions ===
- 2005 Poetics of Color: Books by Anne Walker at Neilson Library, Smith College (solo)
- 2007 Œuvres sur papier, Galerie Synthèse, Bruxelles (solo)
- 2007 Le Livre dans tous ses états, Biblioteca Alexandrina, Alexandrie, Egypt
- 2007 André Biren : Livres d'artiste, Banque de Luxembourg, Luxembourg, Grand-duché
- 2007 Biren éditeur : Hommage à André Biren, Librairie Nicaise, Paris
- 2008 Au-delà de l’horizon, Librairie Auguste Blaizot, Paris (solo)
- 2008 Guillevic avec les autres, Bibliothèque de Rennes Métropole, Renne
- 2009 The Book as Art, artists’ books from the National Museum of Women in the Arts, McMullen Museum of Art, Boston College, Chestnut Hill, MA
- 2009 L’Atelier de Michel Butor, Maison de la Poésie, Paris
- 2009 100 livres d’artistes avec Michel Butor, Château de Lucinges
- 2010 Anne Walker / Bertrand Dorny livres d’artistes, Galerie de la Bibliothèque Aragon, Choisy-le-Roi
- 2010 Écrits de Georges Coppel avec un accrochage d’œuvres de Bertrand Dorny et Anne Walker, Galerie Olivier Nouvellet, Paris
- 2010 Michel Butor et les artistes : les mots entrent en peinture, Musée des Beaux-arts de Brest
- 2011 Livres d'artistes: Bertrand Dorny /Anne Walker en collaboration avec Michel Butor, Espace du Livre d'artistes, Lucinges
- 2011 Parole & Figure, Museo Villa dei Cedri, Bellinzona, Suisse
- 2013 Fidélités livres d'artistes : Bertrand Dorny et Anne Walker avec Michel Butor, Atelier 28, Lyon
- 2014 Feminines? autour d'Anne Walker, Abbaye de Saint Florent le Vieil (Maine et Loire)
- 2014 A vos papiers, Galerie Routes, Paris
- 2014 Michel Butor et ses amis, Bibliothèque Nationale, Reykjavik, Island

== Works about Anne Walker ==
- Kessler, Edward (preface): Anne Walker, exhibition catalogue, Galerie La Pochade Paris 1974
- Piza, Clélia (preface): Anne Walker, exhibition catalogue, Galerie Biren, Paris, 1979.
- Plazy, Gilles (preface): Jardins, exhibition catalogue, Galerie Biren, Paris, 1987.
- Le Roman de l'emotion, ou Le Travail d'Anne Walker by Bernard Noël, Angers: Présence de l'Art contemporain, 1996.
- Herbert, Robert: Anne Walker: Painted Books, exhibition catalogue, The Boston Athenaeum, Boston, 2003.
- Anne Walker: Gouaches et Pastels sur Papier, by Yves Peyré; Michel Butor, poèms, [Tesserte]: Pagine Arte, [2013].
