= Renata Bernal =

American artist

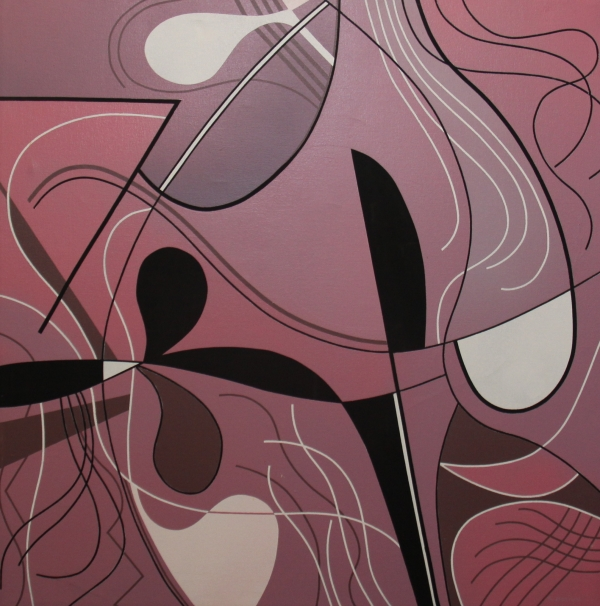
- "Red Mardi Gras" acrylic airbrush on canvas painting by Renata Bernal
- Born: Renata Fine; February 3, 1937 (age 89); Munich, Germany
- Education: Cooper Union Art School, San Francisco Art Institute, Brown University
- Known for: Drawing, painting
- Movement: Abstract Expressionism, Geometric abstraction, Hard-edge painting

Renata Bernal (born February 3, 1937, in Munich, Germany is a contemporary American artist. Her work spans a broad range of media including oil paintings, acrylic paintings, pastel paintings, lithograph, woodcuts, and ink drawings. She has exhibited in New York City, San Francisco, Providence, Rhode Island, and in numerous cities in upstate New York, and her artwork can be seen in permanent collections at the Binghamton University Foundation and the historic Security Mutual Life building in Binghamton, New York.

== Life and work ==
Renata Bernal was born in Munich, (Germany) in 1937, and came to the United States at the age of 13.

She attended the Cooper Union Art School in New York City and graduated with a Bachelor of Fine Arts degree from the San Francisco Art Institute and a Masters in Art Education from Brown University.

While a student at the San Francisco Art Institute, Bernal had a strong interest in the graphic arts. She studied lithography and etching with Nathan Oliveira between 1956 and 1959. Throughout the 1950s and 1960s, she also worked with ink drawing, woodcuts and oil painting.

In the late 1960s Bernal began working with acrylic airbrush ("air gun") on canvas. The airbrush allowed her to produce, with acrylic paint, the same feeling of luminosity that she had grown to love about oil paintings. Over the following decades this was the primary medium that she used for her large abstract pieces, although she continued to work in other media and styles: pastel and charcoal portraits in the 1970s and 1980s, and ink drawings in the 1990s.

Renata has donated a number of her works to benefit local charities and non-profit organizations, such as the Art Mission Project and WSKG Public Broadcasting.

Renata is currently retired in Binghamton in upstate New York, where she continues to enjoy practicing her artwork, writing poetry, and participating in her local Unitarian Universalist congregation.
