= Willa Nasatir =

American artist

- Born: 1990 (age 35–36); Los Angeles, California
- Education: Cooper Union
- Occupation: Artist
- Known for: Visual art, photography

Willa Nasatir (born 1990) is an American visual artist and photographer. In 2017, Nasatir presented a solo exhibition at the Whitney Museum organized by Jane Panetta.

== Life and work ==
Willa Nasatir was born in 1990 in Los Angeles, California. She attended Cooper Union and received a BFA degree in 2012. Nasatir was a recipient of the Louis B. Comfort Tiffany Foundation Award in 2015.

She uses a spectrum of material and optical technics to make images. From soaking prints in water, sanding them down, burning and freezing them, then rephotographing them through translucent textured screens. Nasatir does not manipulate the images on the computer, letting the surreal effects happen entirely in the camera.

== Exhibitions ==
- September–October 2015 – White Room, White Columns, New York City
- March–April, 2016 – Chapter NY, New York City
- September–October, 2016 – François Ghebaly Gallery, Los Angeles, California
- February–June 2017 – Albright-Knox Art Gallery, Buffalo, New York
- July–October 2017 – Whitney Museum of American Art, New York City, organized by Jane Panetta
- 2019 – Studio Photography: 1887–2019, Simon Lee Gallery, New York City, New York
