= Harold Van Buren Voorhis =

American writer (1894–1983)

Harold Van Buren Voorhis (January 3, 1894 – May 23, 1983) was a chemist, noted Masonic author, and executive at Macoy Publishers and Masonic Supply Company.

Harold Van Buren Voorhis 1977

== Education and career ==
Harold was born January 3, 1894, to Thomas Voorhis, Jr. (1864-1941) and Mary Peck Bates (1868-1962) at Rector Place, Red Bank, New Jersey. He attended Red Bank High School, graduating in 1912. He attended Cooper Union College from 1912–13 and Columbia University Teachers Extension from 1913–16.

He worked as a chemist at Bull & Roberts, in New York, NY from 1912–20, and returned there later for a succession of positions starting in 1943: secretary-treasurer (1943–59); assistant to the president (1962); and consultant (1963–67). He served in the U.S. Navy during World War I from January 1, 1917, to February 13, 1919. He later became vice president of Macoy Publishing and Masonic Supply Co. from 1946–70.

He was an early amateur radio hobbyist, joining the Radio League of America in its first year, 1915, and American Radio Relay League in 1922, eight years after its founding.

He married first Lucille Marie Hottendorf on July 2, 1932, in Elkton, Maryland and second Ethel Rita Landau (1914-1988) on October 20, 1953, in New York, New York.

== Masonic career ==
He was Worshipful Master of Mystic Brotherhood Lodge 21, F. & A. M. of Red Bank, NJ in 1937, and served in many other capacities in many other Masonic groups.

== Selected writings ==
- Arthur Edward Waite, a check list of his writings (1932) ("regular edition" of 150 copies)
- Arthur Edward Waite: a check list of his Writings (1932) ("limited edition" of 100 numbered copies)
- The history of organized masonic Rosicrucianism ... (1935) ("limited edition" of 52 copies)
- The Eastern Star - The Evolution From a Rite to an Order (1938); reprinted 1976
- [Negro Masonry in the United States] - (1940) reprinted 2003
- History of Knight Templary in New Jersey (1944)
- Thumb-nail Sketches on Medieval Knighthoods: Together with Modern Grand priories, Grand Encampments,Rrituals of the Order and the Uniforms (1945)
- Facts for Freemasons (1951)
- 100 Year Celebration of Mystic Brotherhood Lodge No. 21, Free and Accepted Masons (1952)
- Masonic organizations and allied orders and degrees: a cyclopaedic handbook (1952)
- Masonic Rosicrucian societies in England, Scotland, Ireland, Greece, Canada & the United States of America (1958)
- Our Colored Brethren: The Story of Alpha Lodge of New Jersey (1960)
- The Royal Order of Scotland (1960)
- The Red Cross of Constantine (1963)
- The Story of the Scottish Rite (1965)
- The History of the Scottish Rite in New Jersey (1970)
- History of the Allied Masonic Degrees of the United States of America (1971)
- A history of organized Masonic Rosicrucianism; Societas Rosicruciana (1983)
