= Bruce Pasternack =

American businessman (1947–2021)

Chief Executive Officer of Special Olympics International
- In office May 2005 – May 2007
- Preceded by: Timothy Shriver
- Succeeded by: Timothy Shriver

Personal details
- Born: Bruce Arthur Pasternack; 20 September 1947 Brooklyn, New York
- Died: 13 January 2021 (aged 73) Tarzana, California
- Spouse(s): Louise Pasternack (m. 1970; div. 1997) Lynne Pasternack (m. 1998)
- Children: 3 (Joanne, Laura, Daniel)
- Education: University of Pennsylvania; Cooper Union

Bruce Pasternack (September 20, 1947 – January 13, 2021) was the president and CEO of the Special Olympics International from 2005 to 2007. He served on the board of directors of Codexis (NASDAQ: CDXS), a biotechnology company based out of Redwood City California, Accelrys, Inc. (NASDAQ: ACCL) a software company specializing in biotechnology, BEA Systems (NASDAQ: BEAS) a company specialized in enterprise infrastructure software products, Quantum Corporation (NYSE: QTM) a manufacturer of data storage devices and systems, and Symyx Technologies (NASDAQ: SMMX) a company that specialized in informatics and automation products. Prior to being a director for public companies, he was a Senior Vice President of Booz-Allen & Hamilton Inc. for over 20 years, and the Managing Partner of the firm's organization and strategic leadership center and its offices in California as well as leading the energy, chemicals and pharmaceuticals practice.

Bruce was a trustee for Cooper Union and also served as a Trustee at Peninsula Temple Beth El, Special Olympics of Northern CA, and was President of the Peninsula Jewish Community Center when the new facility was conceived of and built in Foster City. He also served on the board of Kehilah High School and JMJ Associates.

Pasternack's government service includes head of energy policy at the Federal Energy Administration, principal staff to the White House Energy Resources Council and the President's Council on Environmental Quality. He was also a member of the Board of Directors of LifeSpring Home Nutrition and Special Olympics International, and served on the advisory board of USC's Center for Effective Organizations.

Pasternack also co-authored two business books, The Centerless Corporation (1998) and Results (2005). The ideas introduced by the book Results are featured to this day as a major focal point of the strategy& (a division of PwC) business model.

Pasternack held degrees in Engineering and Operations Research from Cooper Union and University of Pennsylvania.

In 2013, Pasternack was diagnosed with younger-onset Alzheimer's disease. As the disease progressed, his family has advocated for research into the causes of and treatment for Alzheimer's.
