= Ronald Brookmeyer =

American public health researcher (born 1954)

- Born: September 4, 1954 (age 72); New York, USA
- Education: BS, Mathematics, 1975, Cooper Union; MSc, 1977, PhD, 1980, Statistics, University of Wisconsin
- Scientific career
- Workplaces: UCLA Fielding School of Public Health; Johns Hopkins Bloomberg School of Public Health

Ronald S. Brookmeyer (born September 4, 1954) is an American public health researcher and biostatistician. He is Distinguished Professor of Biostatistics at the UCLA Fielding School of Public Health. He served as seventh dean of the UCLA Fielding School of Public Health (interim dean, 2018-2020; dean, 2020-2026). He is an elected member of the National Academy of Medicine. He serves on the Statistics Board of the Reviewing Editors of Science Magazine.

== Early life and education ==
Brookmeyer was born on September 4, 1954, in New York, US. He completed his Bachelor of Science degree in mathematics from Cooper Union in 1975. He then completed his Master of Science (MSc) and Doctor of Philosophy (PhD) degrees in statistics from the University of Wisconsin in 1977 and 1980, respectively. During his time at Cooper Union, he developed a mathematical model of the parasite-host relationship on the population growth of schistosomiasis.

== Career ==
Brookmeyer joined the faculty at the Johns Hopkins University Bloomberg School of Public Health in 1981 as an Assistant Professor of Biostatistics. During this period, Brookmeyer created tools and models using statistical, informational, and mathematical sciences to address and quantify the HIV/AIDS epidemic. In 1992, he was awarded the Mortimer Spiegelman gold medal by the American Public Health Association for contributions to health statistics. Brookmeyer also taught workshops on biostatistics in China at the request of the Chinese Centers for Disease Control, becoming one of the first U.S. biostatisticians teaching biostatistics in China in 1985. He also served on the editorial board of the journal Statistics in Medicine from 1985 to 1994.

Brookmeyer developed models to assess the magnitude of the anthrax attacks following 9/11 and to rapidly address biosecurity and bioterrorism emergencies in the future.

In other work, Brookmeyer developed models to project the global burden of Alzheimer’s disease and the potential positive impact of future therapies and other strategies to prevent or delay the onset and progression of symptoms. He developed models to determine the number of persons living with pre-clinical Alzheimer’s disease and mild cognitive impairment as well as the lifetime risk of Alzheimer’s disease.

Brookmeyer was appointed Chair of the Johns Hopkins Master of Public Health Program in 2002. He was elected chair of the Statistics Section of American Association for Advancement of Science (AAAS). In 2007, Brookmeyer was elected a member of the National Academy of Medicine (formerly referred to as the Institute of Medicine).

In 2010 he joined the faculty at the UCLA Fielding School of Public Health. He served as seventh dean of the UCLA Fielding School of Public Health from 2018 to 2026 (interim dean, 2018-2020; dean, 2020-2026).

Brookmeyer was awarded the President's Citation from Cooper Union in 2010 "for the development of new statistical methods and models for tracking the spread and consequences of disease." He was appointed to the Statistical Board of Reviewing Editors for Science Magazine in 2014. In the same year, Brookmeyer was named the 2014 Norman Breslow Distinguished Lecturer at the University of Washington, having previously been the Lester Breslow Distinguished lecturer at UCLA in 2012. In 2015, Brookmeyer received the Nathan Mantel Lifetime Achievement Award from American Statistical Association's Section on Statistics in Epidemiology for his "valuable lifetime contributions at the intersection of statistical science and epidemiology."

In 2018, Brookmeyer was named Interim Dean and in 2020 named Dean of the UCLA Fielding School of Public Health. In 2020, he was also named Chair of UCLA's COVID-19 Future Planning Task Force. During the COVID-19 pandemic, he advocated for the development of a new approach to clinical trials conducted during pandemics. In the co-authored paper, the researchers suggested a "core-protocol concept" to clinical trials, which could be applied across infectious disease outbreaks and allow for the addition of new team members over time.

== Selected publications ==
BOOKS

- Brookmeyer, R; Gail, MH (1994). AIDS epidemiology: A Quantitative Approach. Monographs in Epidemiology and Biostatistics. New York: Oxford University Press. ISBN 9780195076417.
- Brookmeyer, R; Stroup, D, eds. (2004). Monitoring the Health of Populations: Statistical principles and methods for public health surveillance. New York; Oxford: Oxford University Press. ISBN 9780195146493.

ARTICLES

- Brookmeyer, Ron; Crowley, John (1982). "A Confidence Interval for the Median Survival Time". Biometrics. 38 (1): 29–41. doi:10.2307/2530286. JSTOR 2530286.
- Brookmeyer, R.; Gail, M. H. (1986). "Minimum Size of the Acquired Immunodeficiency Syndrome (AIDS) Epidemic in the United States". Lancet. 2 (8519): 1320–1322. doi:10.1016/s0140-6736(86)91444-3. PMID 2878184.
- Brookmeyer, R. (1991). "Reconstruction and Future Trends of the AIDS Epidemic in the United States". Science. 253 (5015): 37–42. Bibcode:1991Sci...253...37B. doi:10.1126/science.2063206. PMID 2063206.
- Brookmeyer, R.; Quinn, T. C. (1995). "Estimation of Current Human Immunodeficiency Virus Incidence Rates from a Cross-Sectional Survey Using Early Diagnostic Tests". American Journal of Epidemiology. 141 (2): 166–172. doi:10.1093/oxfordjournals.aje.a117404. PMID 7817972.
- Brookmeyer, R.; Gray, S.; Kawas, C. (1998). "Projections of Alzheimer's disease in the United States and the public health impact of delaying disease onset". American Journal of Public Health. 88 (9): 1337–1342. doi:10.2105/ajph.88.9.1337. PMC 1509089. PMID 9736873.
- Brookmeyer, R.; Johnson, E.; Bollinger, R. (2003). "Modeling the optimum duration of antibiotic prophylaxis in an anthrax outbreak". Proceedings of the National Academy of Sciences of the United States of America. 100 (17): 10129–10132. Bibcode:2003PNAS..10010129B. doi:10.1073/pnas.1631983100. PMC 187789. PMID 12890865.
- Brookmeyer, R.; Johnson, E.; Bollinger, R. (2004). "Public health vaccination policies for containing an anthrax outbreak". Nature. 432 (7019): 901–904. Bibcode:2004Natur.432..901B. doi:10.1038/nature03087. PMID 15602561.
- Brookmeyer, R.; Johnson, E.; Ziegler-Graham, K.; Arrighi, H. M. (2007). "Forecasting the global burden of Alzheimer's disease". Alzheimer's & Dementia. 3 (3): 186–191. doi:10.1016/j.jalz.2007.04.381. PMID 19595937.
- Brookmeyer, R.; Abdalla, N.; Kawas, C. H.; Corrada, M. M. (2018). "Forecasting the prevalence of preclinical and clinical Alzheimer's disease in the United States". Alzheimer's & Dementia. 14 (2): 121–129. doi:10.1016/j.jalz.2017.10.009. PMC 5803316. PMID 29233480.
- Brookmeyer, R.; Abdalla, N. (2018). "Estimation of lifetime risks of Alzheimer's disease dementia using biomarkers for preclinical disease". Alzheimer's & Dementia. 14 (8): 981–988. doi:10.1016/j.jalz.2018.03.005. PMC 6097953. PMID 29802030.
