= Mike Roseberry =

English cricketer (born 1966)

Personal information
- Full name: Michael Anthony Roseberry
- Born: 28 November 1966 (age 59); Pennywell, Sunderland, England
- Batting: Right-handed
- Bowling: Right arm medium
- Role: Batsman

Domestic team information
- Years: Team
- 1985–1994: Middlesex
- 1995–1998: Durham
- 1999–2001: Middlesex

Career statistics
Competition	First-class	List A
Matches	236	218
Runs scored	11,950	5,674
Batting average	33.37	30.83
100s/50s	21/58	6/38
Top score	185	121
Balls bowled	511	46
Wickets	4	1
Bowling average	101.50	51.00
5 wickets in innings	0	0
10 wickets in match	0	n/a
Best bowling	1/1	1/22
Catches/stumpings	165/–	71/–
- Source: Cricket Archive, 27 April 2012

Michael Anthony Roseberry (born 28 November 1966 in Pennywell, Sunderland) is a former English cricketer.

Mike Roseberry was educated at Durham School, where he formed a reputation as an all-round sportsman. As an exciting right-handed batsman, he was honoured by The Cricket Society.

He represented Middlesex in two spells (1984–1994; Cap 1990 and 1999–2001), Durham (1995–1998; Captain 1995–1996). He forged a successful opening partnership for Middlesex with Desmond Haynes and he enjoyed his best season in 1992 with 2,044 runs in first-class cricket. This led to him being chosen for the England "A" tour of Australia. However, his career did not kick on from this height. He left Middlesex to take on the captaincy of his home county of Durham, but suffered a miserable loss of form. He resigned his captaincy of Durham in August 1996; in four seasons there he never made a County Championship century. He returned to Middlesex in 1999 with limited success, never reproducing the form of his best years. He was awarded a testimonial by Middlesex in 2002.

He is the elder son of Matty Roseberry, a successful Durham businessman and his younger brother Andrew represented Leicestershire and Glamorgan. He is a supporter of Sunderland Football Club, and is married to Helen with two daughters.
