= Freda Diamond =

American industrial designer

- Born: April 11, 1905; New York City
- Died: 1998
- Spouse: Alfred Baruch

Freda Diamond (1905-1998) was an American industrial designer known for her insight into American consumer taste.

== Life ==
=== Early life ===
Freda Diamond was born in New York City on April 11, 1905, to Russian-born parents. Freda and her sister, Lillian, were raised by her widowed mother, Ida, who worked as a dress designer. Ida was also a noted anarchist, and close friend of activist Emma Goldman.

Diamond attended the Women’s Art School at the Cooper Union in New York city where she studied decorative design, graduating in 1924. Following her graduation, she worked for William Baumgarten. Dissatisfied with her assignments from Baumgarten, Diamond began a job as a manager and stylist for Stern Brothers where she became familiar with mass manufacturing.

=== Consultancy ===
After six years at Stern Brothers, Diamond opened her own consultancy.

In 1942, she was commissioned to co-design glassware for Libbey Glass with Virginia Hamill. For the project, Diamond conducted a year-long market research survey of consumer preferences in style, price, and material. She would go on to design almost 80 pieces of glassware between 1946 and her retirement in 1988. Diamond and Hamill's designs, first manufactured immediately following WWII, were incredibly popular, selling in the millions. She received significant recognition for her designs including the 1950 and 1952 Museum of Modern Art's "Good Design Award." In 1954, Life Magazine named her "Designer for Everybody." Clients during this period included Magnolia Products, General Electric, and Sear & Roebuck, designing toilet seat covers, vacuum cleaners, and doorknobs.

Diamond spent much of the following decades working as a consultant for a number of international companies. In this capacity, she traveled to Japan twice, providing insight into American consumer preferences.

She died in 1998.
