= Lee Brozgol =

American artist (1941–2021)

- Born: June 28, 1941; Detroit
- Died: October 3, 2021 (aged 80); New York City
- Known for: Visual Art and Social Work
- Movement: Contemporary art, public art

Lee Brozgol (June 28, 1941 – October 3, 2021) was an artist, arts educator, and social worker, whose work addresses social, emotional, and cultural elements of contemporary life across the United States. Brozgol is especially known for his murals and public art, which are on permanent display in Downtown Manhattan.

== Biography ==
Brozgol was born in Detroit. His family moved to Chicago when he was nine years old. He attended the University of Chicago, and then moved to New York City, where he studied art at Cooper Union. Together with a group of artists, Brozgol and his wife bought a building on the Lower East Side, where they lived, worked, and raised a family.

== Career ==
Brozgol balanced working as an artist and a social worker. In 1976, he was awarded a prize for his sculptural work in the Brooklyn Museum’s Fence Art Show. In the 1980s, Brozgol was the director of Foundation House, where he worked with an HIV positive homeless population on the Lower East Side. Later in the 1980s, Brozgol started a socially engaged series of works on paper called “Hidden America.” He followed that body of work with another humanist-centered suite of works titled “40 PATRIOTS/countless americans,” which are mask-like sculptures that resemble skulls. Throughout his career, Brozgol continued creating masks using paper-mâché, found objects, and paint. These masks are often burlesque representations of political figures and cultural icons, transformed into imaginative monstrous manifestations that critique systems of wealth, power, and governance. In addition to his studio art, Brozgol created several works of art for public display in schools, subways stations, and community centers.

== Notable artworks ==
Brozgol’s work incorporates elements of political and social discourse in a manner that examines both individual figures and the collective consciousness of American life. While creating the series “Hidden America,” Brozgol utilized his experiences as a social worker. The series features a mixed media artwork on paper for each of the fifty states in the United States of America. The subject of each work was derived from correspondences between Brozgol and strangers he anonymously connected with by placing personal ads in local and niche periodicals and classifieds. Prior to depicting strangers through symbolic portraits, Brozgol completed a series called “Significant Others,” consisting of straightforward portraits of his friends, family, and neighbors.

Brozgol’s “40 PATRIOTS/countless americans,” continued his exploration into the human psyche and provides a biting critique of political and cultural figures throughout recent United States history. This series of work consisted of fifteen flags and forty masks, all depicting politically charged and socially conscious themes. The flags re-imagine a new geopolitical landscape, which is inclusive of marginalized groups and identities. The masks represent death masks for right-wing figures and ideologies. Brozgol explained the significance of this imagery and reference by saying, "Metaphor is my business. My choice of the death head to represent right-wing sociopolitical icons is simply my way of saying that I think that their vision for America is archaic, and it has got to go." The series became a part of the ongoing culture wars, with conservative and evangelical individuals calling for the work’s censorship and defunding of the National Endowment for the Arts and the nonprofit art venues where the work was exhibited.

A more recent group of masks, called “Six Chicks and a Dick,” lampoons seven public figures: Martha Stewart, Kris Jenner, Caitlyn Jenner, Dick Cheney, Sarah Palin, Melania Trump, and Ann Coulter. Brozgol stated that the project “has to do with a feeling. Egocentricity and self importance is a red flag for me. There is something enraging about the artificiality that you want to get beyond it. So they evoke something in me.”

== Public art ==
Brozgol was a steadfast supporter of his local community. He received commissions to create public murals that represent a diverse and multifaceted portrait of New York City. His Greenwich Village Murals, made in collaboration with local public school students in the 5th and 6th grade from P.S. 41, are a historical acknowledgement of the storied neighborhood. The mosaic mural has been on view at the Christopher Street-Sheridan Square Subway Station in lower Manhattan since 1994. The four separate panels that make the totality of the Greenwich Village Murals are divided into themes: "Bohemians," "Rebels," "Founders," and "Providers.” Each thematic topic is represented by figures from the neighborhood’s past and present, such as the Lenape people who were the original inhabitants of the land, and Mary Simkhovitch, a twentieth century reformer who advocated for social equity and provided services to support immigrants. Altogether, there are about forty unique individuals represented in the mural.

His other public commissions are a mosaic mural, titled Our Story, installed at Liberty High School on Eighteenth Street and Eighth Avenue in Manhattan, and a stained glass mural, called Beacon, which is installed in the atrium of P.S. 66 in Canarsie, Brooklyn.

== Solo exhibitions ==
- Six Chicks and a Dick, Dixon Place, New York, NY, 2017
- Hidden America, University of Alabama at Birmingham, Birmingham, AL, 2006
- 40 Patriots/countless americans, Dance Theater Workshop, New York, NY, 1991
- Significant Others, Painted Bride Art Center, Philadelphia, PA, 1982
- Lee Brozgol: Paintings, Sangamon State University, Springfield, IL, 1973
