= Andrew Roseberry =

English cricketer

Personal information
- Full name: Andrew Roseberry
- Born: 2 April 1971 (age 55); Sunderland, County Durham, England
- Batting: Right-handed
- Bowling: Right-arm medium
- Relatives: Mike Roseberry (brother)

Domestic team information
- Years: Team
- 1994: Glamorgan
- 1993–1997: Northumberland
- 1992: Leicestershire

Career statistics
| Competition | FC |
|---|---|
| Matches | 7 |
| Runs scored | 263 |
| Batting average | 29.22 |
| 100s/50s | –/2 |
| Top score | 94 |
| Balls bowled | – |
| Wickets | – |
| Bowling average | – |
| 5 wickets in innings | – |
| 10 wickets in match | – |
| Best bowling | – |
| Catches/stumpings | 3/– |
- Source: Cricinfo, 3 July 2010

Andrew Roseberry (born 2 April 1971) is a former English cricketer. Roseberry was a right-handed batsman who bowled right-arm medium pace. He was born at Sunderland, County Durham.

Roseberry made his first-class debut for Leicestershire in 1992 against the touring Pakistanis, in what was his only first-class appearance for the county.

Roseberry joined Northumberland in 1993, where he made his Minor Counties Championship against Bedfordshire. From 1993 to 1997, he represented the county in 19 Minor Counties Championship fixtures, and 6 MCCA Knockout Trophy matches.

In 1994, Roseberry joined Glamorgan, where he made his County Championship debut against Sussex. He played 5 more first-class fixtures for Glamorgan in 1994, with his final first-class match coming against Hampshire. In his 7 first-class matches, he scored 263 runs at a batting average of 29.22, with 2 half centuries and a high score of 94.

== Family ==
His brother Mike played cricket for Middlesex, Durham County Cricket Club and the Marylebone Cricket Club.
