= Fred Kohler (author) =

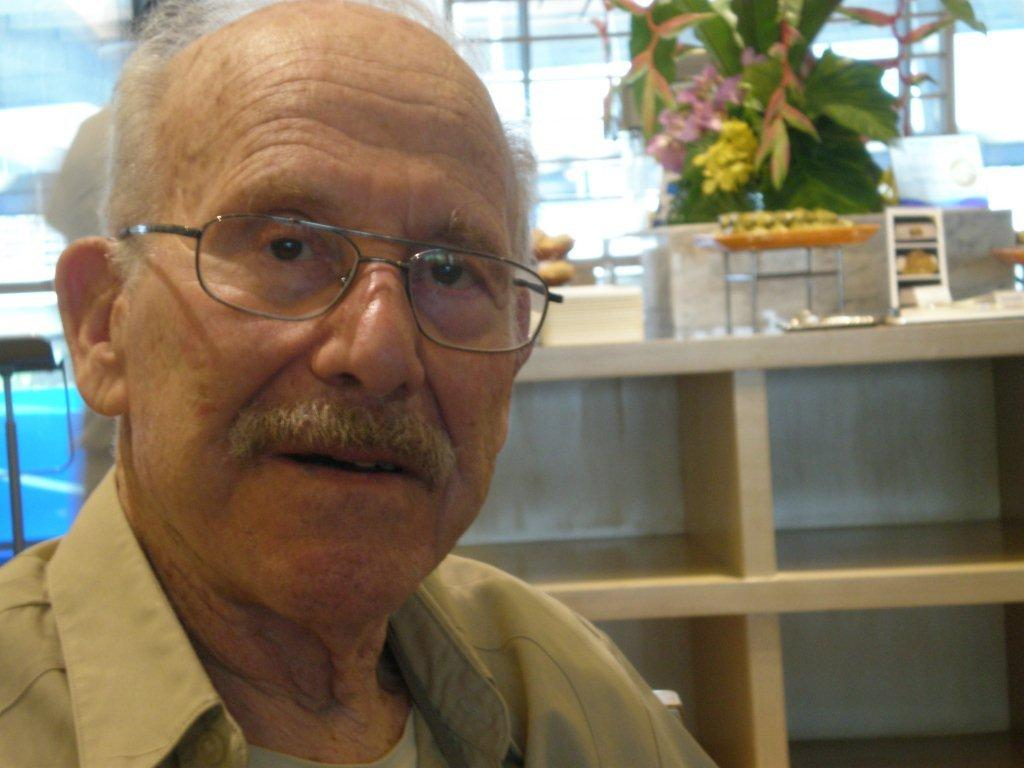
Kohler on his 90th birthday (2010)

Fred Kohler (born 22 April 1920) is a German-born American inventor, author, and lecturer. He wrote about the human species becoming a "societal organism" (his original terminology) or super organism (in the popular modern usage) as a further development in the human evolution of life.

== Biography ==
=== Early years ===
Kohler was born as Fritz Kohler in Nuremberg, Germany in 1920 into a secular, middle-class family of mostly German-Jewish ancestry. His mother died when he was eight years old and his father died when he was eleven. Kohler, an only child, was granted a life-saving visa as an orphan to enter the US in 1935.

After graduating from Stuyvesant High School in New York City in 1937 he was admitted to Cooper Union, a highly competitive, "tuition-free" college where he was, in 1942, granted a degree in chemical engineering.

Kohler obtained American citizenship in 1943. Unable to join the Armed Forces in World War II because of eyesight problems, he engaged in war work as an engineer.

Kohler was married for several years in the 1950s, but he has no children nor close relatives.

In 1975 he obtained an M.A. from Southern Oregon University in Ashland, Oregon.

=== Career ===
==== Industrial activity ====
1946 - 1956 After World War II he started the Plastic Welding Company designing and building equipment for welding plastics.

1957 - 1965 Director of Research and Design, Thermatool corporation

1966 - 1967 Chief Engineer, Industrial Microwave Division of Eimac-Varian

Kohler continued to pursue his profession as a research engineer, as a designer of industrial electronic equipment, and as a consultant and lecturer. Kohler was granted many patents for various inventions in the course of his activities. Kohler's achievement with the greatest technological impact was patent 3243753 making possible the polyswitch, an automatically resetting circuit protection device which shuts off a circuit when a current overload is sensed but automatically resets when the surge is over, thus avoiding blown fuses and machine stoppages

Kohler's resettable fuse is now a passive component of many batteries in computers, VCRs, cars, and a host of other products. The cumulative sales of protective devices utilizing this material have run into several billions of dollars. Kohler derived no monetary rewards from this invention.

==== Philosophical writings ====
In 1952 Kohler published his book Evolution and Human Destiny through the publishing house Philosophical Library. In this book, Kohler argues that there is an integration process in evolution, homologous to other consolidation processes that have occurred in the evolution of life during previous epochs, and this process is leading the human species towards the formation of a Super Organism on a higher level of complexity, which Kohler originally called a "Societal Organism." In the form presented, this was a novel concept in 1952 and met with skepticism, but also some support. Kohler's book has been digitized on the internet by the initiative of the Marine Biology Laboratory.

In 2010 Kohler published an essay entitled "Evolution and Human Destiny: Reflections of the Author Sixty Years after the Book was Written" through Internet Archive. In the essay, he corrects the antiquated biology and chemistry of the original book but re-affirms his central concepts. He also discusses some unsolved problems in cosmology and expresses gratification that the most important concepts in Evolution and Human Destiny have largely been vindicated during his lifetime, according to him. He also reflects on his own life.

=== Recent activity ===
Kohler lived as an adult in New York, Hawaii, California, Arizona and in Ashland, Oregon where he resided from 1984. He traveled widely and enjoyed good physical and mental health through his 90s. He enjoyed hiking on the Pacific Crest Trail.

== Works ==
- Evolution and Human Destiny. New York: Philosophical Library, 1952.
- Evolution and Human Destiny: Reflections of the Author Sixty Years after the Book was Written., Self-published / Internet Archive, 2010.
