= Annie Louisa Walker =

English and Canadian author (1836–1907)

Anna Louisa Walker (23 June 1836 – 7 July 1907) was an English and Canadian teacher and author. She wrote five novels and two collections of poetry and edited an autobiography. Her poem "The Night Cometh" provides the text of the popular hymn "Work, for the night is coming".

== Early life and teaching ==
Anna Louisa was born to Robert and Anna Walker on 23 June 1836 in Brewood, Staffordshire, England. She was the youngest of her father's nine children, although only her two brothers Thomas Andrew Walker and Charles were full siblings, the older ones being from her father's two previous marriages. Her father was a civil engineer, who took the family to Pointe-Lévy, Lower Canada, about 1853, where he was employed on the Grand Trunk Railway. In 1858, the family relocated again, to Sarnia, Canada West. Soon after their arrival, Anna Louisa and her sisters Frances and Isabella founded a private girls' school. The school was only open a few years before the deaths of Frances and Isabella forced its closure.

== Poetry ==
Annie Louisa began publishing poems in newspapers and periodicals when she was a teenager. She put out an anonymous collection of them entitled Leaves from the Backwoods in 1861. This was printed in Montreal by John Lovell. Most of the poems in the collection have religious or natural themes One, "The Night Cometh", was set to music by Ira D. Sankey, who published it as a hymn, "Work, for the night is coming", in the collection Sacred Songs and Solos. As the poem was published anonymously, Walker received no credit in the volume for the lyrics, which were commonly misattributed to the hymnist Sidney Dyer.

== Return to England ==
In 1863 or 1864, Annie Louisa accompanied her parents back to England, where her father died in September 1864, followed soon after by her mother. In 1866, she found a place as a companion-housekeeper with her second cousin, Margaret Oliphant, in 1866. Oliphant was a successful writer, and encouraged Walker to write fiction rather than poetry, and recommended her works to publishers with which she already had contact.

Walker's first novel, A Canadian Heroine, appeared in 1873. It tells of a 16-year-old living in a small town along the St Lawrence who is courted by a Canadian man, but almost drives him off when she becomes enamoured of a visiting English aristocrat. The Englishman's interest in her turns out to be fleeting. The story builds up into an allegory for what Walker perceived as the naivety of the new world and the corruption of the old.

Walker's second novel, Hollywood, ensued in 1875. In 1876, she published a collection entitled Plays for Children. Walker's third novel, Against her Will, published in 1877, describes how a young woman copes with her father's illness. Her competence and strength of character evoke the idea of the New Woman, which was developing at the time.

Walker's fourth novel, Lady's Holm., was published in 1878 by Samuel Tinsley & Company. A review in The Spectator praised it for "picturesque descriptions and good incisive delineation of character". W. W. Tulloch's review in The Academy praised the story for its character development, descriptive language and wholesomeness, while criticising it for a somewhat stale and outdated style. Walker's fifth novel, Two Rival Lovers, followed in 1881.

On 29 January 1884, Walker married Harry Coghill a wealthy widower whose fortune was made manufacturing chemicals. The family settled in Staffordshire.

In 1890, her volume Oak and Maple: English and Canadian Verses was published under her married name, Anna Louisa Coghill. More than half the poems in it were reprinted from Leaves from the Backwoods and concerned religious or natural themes. "The Night Cometh" is reprinted, and Coghill remarks that she discovered the poem's use in a hymn, and it being improperly attributed in the hymnal. After hearing the hymn at a temperance meeting, she tracked down the source, and subsequent appearances of it were correctly attributed.

Mrs Coghill published The Trial of Mary Broom; a Staffordshire Story, a sixth novel, in 1894. Harry Coghill died in 1897. In 1899, Mrs Coghill served as editor of her second cousin's Autobiography and Letters of Mrs. M. O. W. Oliphant.

She died on 7 July 1907 in Bath, England.

== Selected works ==
- Leaves from the Backwoods. Montreal: John Lovell. 1861.
- A Canadian Heroine. London: Tinsley Brothers. 1873. In three volumes:
  - Volume I
  - Volume II
  - Volume III
- Against her will. London: Samuel Tinsley. 1877. In three volume:
  - Volume I
  - Volume II
  - Volume III
- Oak and Maple: English and Canadian verses. London: Kegan Paul. 1890. Preface.
