= Sylvia Plevritis =

American engineer

Sylvia Katina Plevritis
- Education: The Cooper Union; Stanford University
- Occupation: Engineer
- Known for: Chair of Biomedical Data Science at Stanford University

Sylvia Katina Plevritis is Professor and Chair of the Department of Biomedical Data Science at Stanford University.

== Education ==
Plevritis received a Bachelor's in Electrical Engineering from The Cooper Union in 1985, an M.S. in Electrical Engineering from Stanford in 1986, a PhD in Electrical Engineering from Stanford University in 1992, and an M.S. in Health Services Research in 1996. She was a NSF fellow for her pre-doctoral work and her dissertation was titled: "Resolution improvements for magnetic resonance spectroscopic images." After her post-doctoral research, she joined Stanford's Department of Radiology as an assistant professor. In 2013, she became a full professor in the department of Radiology and (by courtesy) Management, Science, and Engineering (MS&E). In 2019, she was appointed as professor and chair of Biomedical Data Science at Stanford University.

== Research and career ==
Plevritis's primary research interests lie in population cancer screening outcomes and developing computational techniques to solve problems within the field of cancer systems biology. In 2006, she was the first to demonstrate the cost-effectiveness of adding Magnetic Resonance Imaging MRI to mammography for screening BRCA1/2 mutation carriers.

In 2000, Plevritis led the National Cancer Institute (NCI) Cancer Intervention and Surveillance Network (CISNET) to understand the effects of screening and adjuvant therapy on breast cancer trends by molecular subtype CISNET is a consortium of NCI-sponsored investigators who use simulation modeling to improve our understanding of cancer control interventions for prevention, screening, and treatment. CISNET is one of 13 research concepts proposed to the Board of Scientific Advisors of the NCI in 2020.

In 2004, Plevritis became the Director of the Stanford Center for Cancer Systems Biology (CCSB) and the Director of the Cancer Systems Biology Scholars (CSBS), and the co-Section Chief of the Integrative Biomedical Imaging Informatics at Stanford (IBIIS). Her lab also focuses on developing computational tools to identify heterogeneous molecular features with the tumor microenvironment, such as SPADE, DRUGNEM, PhenoSTAMP, and REMI. She was a speaker for the AI and Cancer Research Symposium at Stanford University in 2025. More information can be found at Dr. Plevritis' website at Stanford University.

== Awards and honors ==
Plevritis received the Distinguished Investigator for the Academy of Radiology Research and Inaugural Award for Basic Scientist of the Year in the Stanford Radiology Department. She is a fellow of the American Institute for Medical and Biological Engineering (AIMBE) and the International Society for Computational Biology (ISCB).
