= Edith Hillinger =

American painter

Edith Hillinger (November 12, 1933 – April 26, 2026) was a California artist who primarily created watercolor paintings and mixed-media collages. She recently lived and worked in Berkeley, California, but moved to Vallejo, California prior to her death.

She was the daughter of architect Franz Hillinger.

== Personal life ==
Hillinger was born November 12, 1933 in Berlin, Germany. In 1937, her family fled to Turkey, where they lived in Istanbul and Ankara. In 1948, the family moved to New York, New York, where Hillinger eventually began her formal art education at the Cooper Union School of Art. She obtained a four-year certificate in painting from Cooper Union and went on to New York University, graduating with a B.A. in 1976.

== Art ==
Though Hillinger draws inspiration from botanical and natural scenes, her career has increasingly leaned toward abstraction. Her work also takes inspiration from her formative experiences in different countries, conveying "whole cultural histories through expression that is utterly personal." Her collage work has been noted for recalling Picasso's graphic work, as well as the paintings of Paul Klee. This work can be seen as a synthesis of the influences of her youth, the adorned surfaces of Turkey and the minimal forms of the Bauhaus.

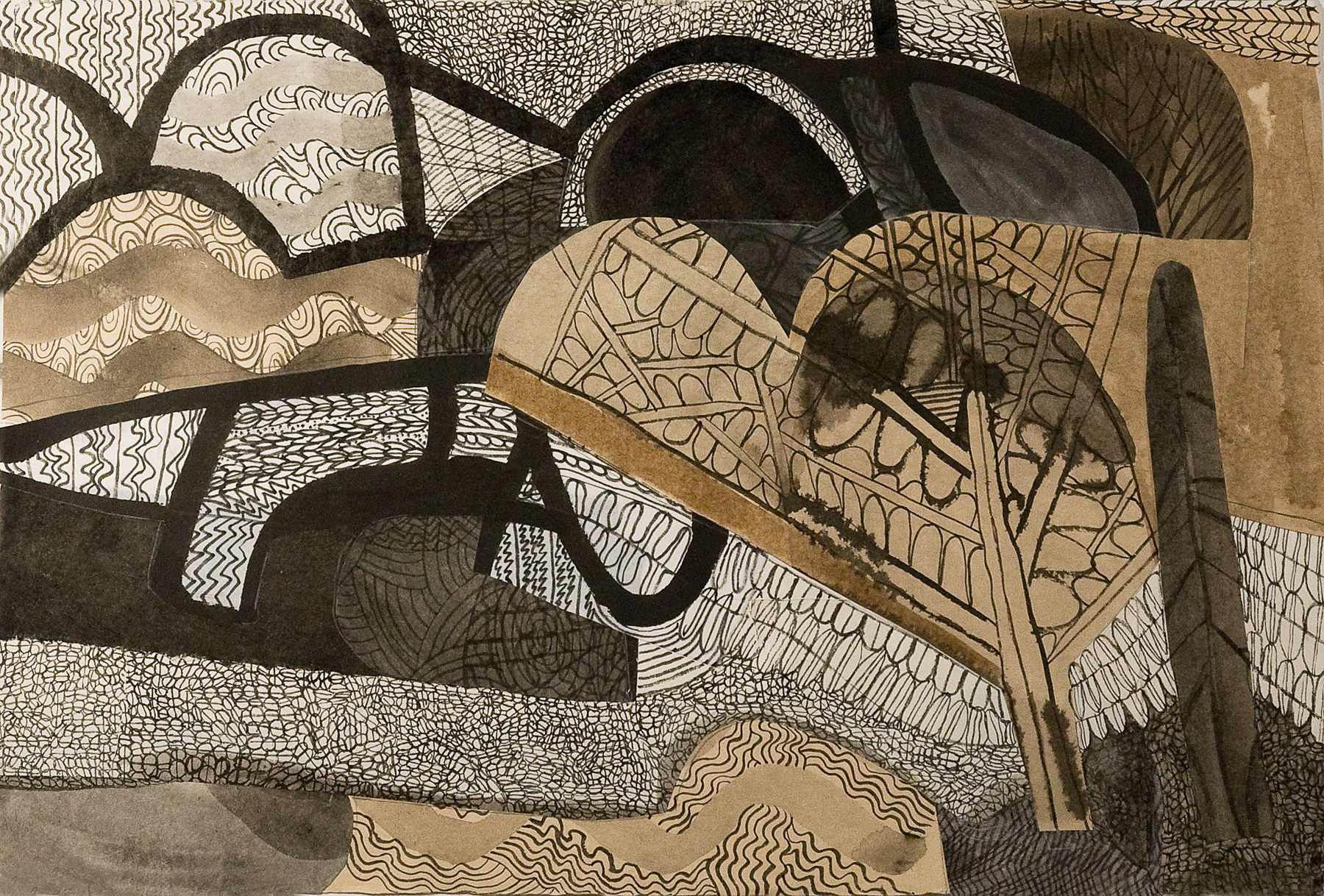
Aerial View

== Feminism ==
Hillinger has been documented as a founding member of the second-wave women's movement, included in a directory of influential members who made notable changes to customs or laws in the US. She continued this work advocating for the inclusion of female artists in the art historical canon. Hillinger founded the Bay Area Women Artists' Legacy Project to highlight women's contributions to Bay Area art.
