= Annie E. A. Walker =

American painter

Annie E. Anderson Walker
- Born: October 5, 1855
- Died: June 9, 1929 (aged 73)
- Education: Académie Julian; Cooper Union
- Known for: Painting
- Style: Portrait

Annie E. Anderson Walker (née Annie E. Anderson) (October 5, 1855 – June 9, 1929) was an African-American artist, known for her portraits and her work in pastels, and for being one of the first African-American women to complete an institutional art education in the United States and exhibit at the Paris Salon.

== Biography ==
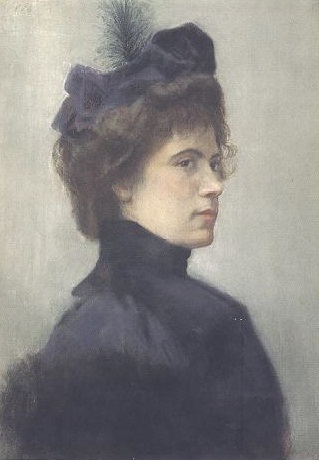
La Parisienne, pastel of 1896, in the collection of Howard University

Born in Flatbush, New York, on October 5, 1855, to Nancy Cassidy and Francis Anderson, Walker was the youngest of five children. She entered the teaching profession at an early age, teaching in Jacksonville, Florida and Orrville, Alabama. After passing examinations before the Selma Board of Education, she was appointed a teacher in the Burwell Academy in Selma, where she taught for several years. In 1875, she married Selma lawyer Thomas Walker in Dallas, Alabama. In 1890, she moved to Washington, D.C., and began private lessons in drawing and painting. After a year of private lessons, Walker was admitted to the Corcoran School of Art, but was refused entry when it was discovered that she was black. When she appeared at the Corcoran, she was told by the admitting instructor that "...the trustees have directed me not to admit colored people. If we had known that you were colored, the committee would not have examined your work." Walker was acquainted with abolitionist Frederick Douglass, and he wrote a powerful appeal to the administration on her behalf asking them to " ...reconsider this exclusion and admit Mrs. Walker to the Corcoran Gallery of Art, and thus remove a hardship and redress a grievous wrong imposed upon a person guilty of no crime and one in every way qualified to compete with others in the refining and ennobling study of art..." His appeal and others, however, drew no positive response and her rejection was not reversed.

Within months of her rejection by the Corcoran Gallery of Art, Walker traveled to New York City to apply to the Cooper Union for the Advancement of Science and Art.

Susan N. Carter, Principal of the Women's Art School at the Cooper Union in 1892, related this about Walker:

"A young colored woman came to the Cooper Union a few months ago. She was most ladylike and prepossessing in appearance. She brought a roll of drawings with her, on which she had been admitted to the Art School of the Corcoran Gallery in Washington. When she presented herself at that school, she was refused a place there, solely on the grounds of her color. She showed me long letters from Frederick Douglas and others, protesting against such an injustice, but the decision against her was not changed. Knowing of the Cooper Institute, she came to New York to see about entering it. Recognizing the wrong done to her race in her exclusion from a school in the Capitol city of our country, twenty-seven years after our war was over, I felt that I was honoring New York City, as well as the dear memory of Mr. Cooper, if I let her at once have a place in my own office (as the class-rooms were full), till a vacancy should occur in the drawing-class room. This young colored girl is doing exceptionally well, and the kindness of her teacher and companions has helped to soothe her former grief."

Walker studied at the Cooper Union from 1892 to 1895 and was a pupil of Thomas Eakins and John Henry Twachtman, who influenced Walker's luminous, impressionistic approach. Upon Walker's graduation in 1895, Susan N. Carter detailed her success at the school:

"It may be remembered that three years ago, a colored woman from Washington, D.C., was admitted to the Woman's Art School. Mrs. Annie E. A. Walker is her name. Coming to the Cooper Union, she was received here, where Mr. Peter Cooper's free gift of instruction made no distinction of race or nationality. Mrs. Walker has been a very satisfactory scholar and has now graduated. She has earned and saved more than $600 since she entered the Cooper Union, and will use this money for a year's study in Paris, after which she proposes to open a studio for portrait painting. The energy, ability and fine character of this colored woman are very encouraging, showing her race's possibilities."

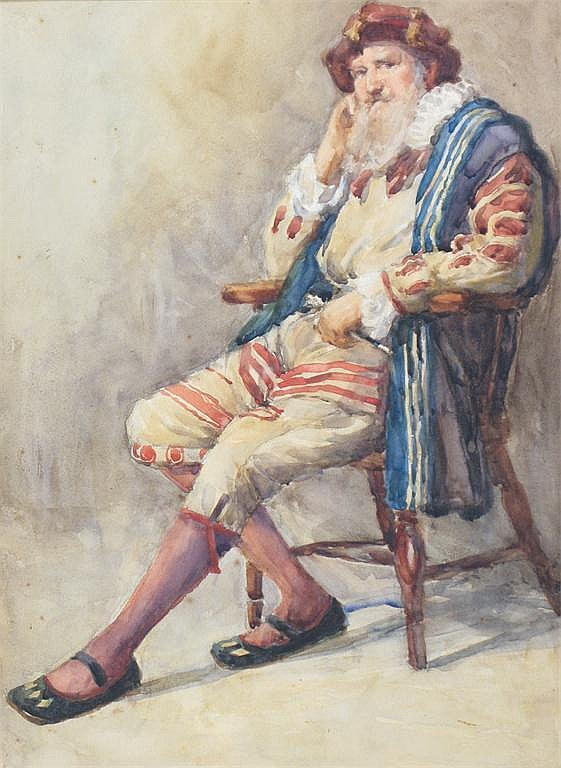
Watercolor of a man in 16th Century dress by Annie E. Anderson Walker

After graduating in 1895, Walker sailed to Paris in September, where she studied at the prestigious Académie Julian, likely the first African-American woman to do so. She was honored by being chosen to exhibit her work at the 1896 Paris Salon, the official juried art exhibition of the Académie des Beaux-Arts in Paris. The work exhibited was a pastel drawing entitled La Parisienne, a portrait of a woman now in the Howard University collection. After her studies, Walker traveled to London, Switzerland, and Italy. Walker returned to the United States in December 1896, settling in Washington, D.C. She continued to paint and draw while balancing her responsibilities as the wife of a successful lawyer. However, two years after returning from Paris, Walker suffered a nervous breakdown, possibly due to the strain of societal pressure and expectations, and ceased her artistic work, remaining invalid and homebound, until she died in 1929 in Washington, D.C.

Although Walker's promising career was tragically short, she was noted especially for her pastels, which were compared with those of Alice Pike Barney and shown at Howard University. Art historian Tritobia Hayes Benjamin said Walker's "...tireless courage, determination, and persistence in becoming an artist in the face of racism and sexism..." She describes Walker's work as "...academic in style and execution, and illustrates an active intuitive ability and spirit, as well as a masterful control of the medium." Walker died on June 9, 1929, at the age of 73, and was buried in Harmony Cemetery in Washington, D.C.

== Exhibitions ==
- 1896 Annual Paris Salon, Paris, France
