= Fred Rosebury =

Fred Rosebury (July 10, 1901 – February 20, 1999) was an American artist and engineer. He is best known for his book, Handbook of Electron Tubes and Vacuum Techniques.

== Early life / radio engineer ==
Born in London, Rosebury emigrated to the United States with his family in 1910 and settled in New York City. After quitting high school, he traveled widely as a radio operator on tankers from 1920 to 1927. He took classes at City College of New York, Columbia University, and Cooper Union College, where he studied commercial art, a career he pursued from 1928 to 1931.

Rosebury worked briefly as a radio engineer and did research for the next 10 years at the Columbia-Presbyterian Medical Center at the College of Physicians and Surgeons in New York, where he started as a part-time volunteer.

== MIT vacuum tube engineer ==
Rosebury joined the MIT Radiation Laboratory in 1942 and invented several top-secret radar devices. While at the Vacuum Tube Lab at the Research Laboratory of Electronics (RLE) from 1951 to 1971, he published two manuals, several scientific papers and wrote and illustrated the "Handbook of Electron Tubes and Vacuum Techniques" (Addison-Wesley, 1965), reprinted by the American Institute of Physics and Springer-Verlag. In 2015, this book is in more than 300 libraries. In addition, he served as a coach for a number of PhD candidates at MIT.

Rosebury retired from MIT in 1971 and founded an engineering consulting firm, Intertech, Inc. One of its clients was NASA, for whom Rosebury designed a heated glove to be worn by astronauts.

He also wrote and illustrated Symbols, Myth, Magic, Fact, and Fancy published in 1974. Rosebury was a member of the Society of Wireless Pioneers, keeping his ham radio operator's registration current and used his "rig" until shortly before his death.

== Artist ==
Fred Rosebury was also an artist who worked in many media, including watercolor, pen and ink, scratchboard, gouache, and he produced many serigraphs (silkscreen prints). He was an early adopter of modernist screen printing, using technique developed in the 1940s.

Rosebury was red-green colorblind, so his use of color, particularly in his few naturalistic scenes, is noteworthy. In his 70s and 80s, he produced a group of about 35 recoupages (constructions made from found objects). He also made unusual jewelry. His work is held by Crystal Bridges Museum of American Art, private collectors, and family members, and has been exhibited at the following venues:

- Columbia University: watercolors, drawings, paintings (blue ribbon award) – 1935
- Grand Central Palace: paintings – 1939
- Museum of Fine Arts, Boston: collage, serigraph – 1948
- MIT staff art show: paintings, serigraphs 1949
- Natick Federal Savings and Loan: serigraphs, drawings – 1950
- Natick Art Association: serigraphs, drawings – 1951
- MIT Music Library: serigraph for publicity – 1957
- Museum of Fine Arts: recoupage – early 1960s
- MIT. art show: serigraphs – 1963
- Cambridge (MA) Art Association: serigraphs – 1971
- WGBH Boston, Channel 2 Auction: serigraph – 1975
- Temple Beth Am, Framingham, MA recoupage – 1977
- NAACP, Boston: 2 recoupages – 1977
- Boston Visual Artists Union: drawings – 1977
- Crystal Bridges Museum of American Art: serigraphs, Bridge and Cambridge Electric – 2011–12

== Personal ==
Rosebury was married to Pauline (Pleasure) Rosebury (1906–1993) in 1936, a poet and artist.
