= List of Guggenheim Fellowships awarded in 2008 =

List of Guggenheim Fellowships awarded in 2008.

== U.S. and Canadian Fellows ==
=== A ===
- Len Ackland, Associate Professor, School of Journalism and Mass Communication, University of Colorado, Boulder: Nuclear power at a crossroads.
- Martha Ackmann, Writer, Leverett, Massachusetts; Senior Lecturer in Gender Studies, Mount Holyoke College: Toni Stone's challenge to baseball and America.
- Yacine Ait-Sahalia, Otto Hack 1903 Professor of Finance and Economics, Princeton University: The econometrics of jumps and volatility.
- Ken Alder, Professor of History and Milton H. Wilson Professor of the Humanities, Northwestern University: Personal identification from the Renaissance to the genome.
- Meena Alexander, Poet, New York City; Distinguished Professor of English, Hunter College and CUNY Graduate Center: Poetry.
- Geri A. Allen, Composer, Upper Montclair, New Jersey; Associate Professor of Jazz Piano and Improvisation, University of Michigan: Music composition.
- Natalia Almada, Filmmaker, Mexico City and Brooklyn, New York: Filmmaking.
- Margaret Lavinia Anderson, Professor of History, University of California, Berkeley: The Armenian Genocide: A German story.
- Nancy Evelyn Andrews, Professor of Art and Design, College of the Atlantic: Filmmaking.
- Rae Armantrout, Poet, San Diego, California; Professor of Poetry and Poetics, University of California, San Diego: Poetry.
- Douglas N. Arnold, Professor of Mathematics, University of Minnesota, Twin Cities: Finite element exterior calculus.
- Shimon Attie, Visual Artist, Brooklyn, New York: Video installation.

=== B ===
- Dean Bakopoulos, Writer, Mineral Point, Wisconsin; Executive Director and Lillian Greenwood Artist-in-residence, Shake Rag Alley Center for the Arts, Mineral Point: Fiction.
- Randy E. Barnett, Carmack Waterhouse Professor of Legal Theory, Georgetown University Law Center: The reconstructed constitution.
- Mason Bates, Composer, Oakland, California: Music Composition.
- Keith Bearden, Filmmaker, Long Island City, New York: Filmmaking.
- Brigitte Miriam Bedos-Rezak, Professor of History, New York University: The imprint and a logic of signs in medieval Europe (1150-1350).
- Jeffrey L. Bennetzen, Norman and Doris Giles Professor of Molecular Biology and Functional Genomics, University of Georgia: Genetic diversity and population structure in the parasitic weed Striga and its crop hosts in Mali.
- Toni Bentley, Writer, Los Angeles, California: General Nonfiction.
- Michael P. Berman, Artist and Photographer, San Lorenzo, New Mexico: Photography.
- Harry Bernstein, Writer, Brick, New Jersey: Now in my nineties.
- Michael D. Bess, Chancellor's Professor of History, Vanderbilt University: A historian's perspective on human biological enhancement.
- João Biehl, Associate Professor of Anthropology, Princeton University: Transcendental values and political life in postcolonial Brazil: The Mucker War.
- Erika Blumenfeld, Artist, Marfa, Texas: Environment-based installation.
- Howard Bodenhorn, Professor of Economics, Clemson University; Research Associate, National Bureau of Economic Research, Cambridge, Massachusetts: The political economy of Jacksonian New York.
- Tim Bowling, Poet, Edmonton, Alberta, Canada: Poetry.
- Stanley Brandes, Professor of Anthropology, University of California, Berkeley: Pets and their people.
- Michael F. Brenson, Independent Scholar, Accord, New York: A biography of David Smith.
- Art Bridgman/Myrna Packer, Choreographers, Valley Cottage, New York; Codirectors, Bridgman/Packer Dance: Choreography.
- Carlyle Brown, Playwright, Minneapolis, Minnesota: Drama.
- Michael Paul Burkard, Poet, Syracuse, New York; Associate Professor of English, MFA Program in Creative Writing, Syracuse University; Instructor, Bennington Writing Seminars, Bennington College: Poetry.

=== C ===
- chameckilerner, Artist Collective, New York City, New York: Choreography and Video
- Christopher Celenza, Professor, Department of German and Romance Languages, Johns Hopkins University: Humanism and language from Petrarch to Poliziano.
- Lan Samantha Chang, Professor of Creative Writing, and Director, The Program in Creative Writing, University of Iowa Writers' Workshop: Fiction.
- Meiling Cheng, Associate Professor of Critical Studies and English, and Director of Critical Studies, School of Theatre, University of Southern California: Contemporary time-based art in China.
- Dan Chiasson, Poet, Sudbury, Massachusetts; Assistant Professor of English, Wellesley College: Poetry.
- Kyong Mee Choi, Composer, Chicago, Illinois; Assistant Professor of Music Composition, Roosevelt University: Music composition.
- Paul Clemens, Assistant to the Dean, College of Liberal Arts and Sciences, Wayne State University: Dismantling a Detroit auto plant.
- Deborah Cohen, Associate Professor of History, Brown University: Family secrets in Britain, 1840-1990.
- Lewis Mitchell Cohen, Director of Renal Palative Care Initiative, Baystate Medical Center, and Professor of Psychiatry, Tufts University School of Medicine: Allegations of murder in the medical community.
- Ovidiu Costin, Professor of Mathematics, Ohio State University: Study of singular differential systems using generalized summability techniques.

=== D ===
- Bill Daniel, Filmmaker, Braddock, Pennsylvania: Filmmaking.
- Sheldon Danziger, H. J. Meyer Distinguished University Professor of Public Policy, Gerald R. Ford School of Public Policy, University of Michigan: Four decades of antipoverty policies.
- William deBuys, Professor of Documentary Studies, College of Santa Fe: An environmental history of the North American Southwest.
- Alice Domurat Dreger, Associate Professor of Clinical Medical Humanities and Bioethics, Feinberg School of Medicine, Northwestern University: Science and identity politics in the Internet age.
- Tony D'Souza, Writer, Sarasota, Florida: Fiction.
- Laurent Dubois, Professor of History and Romance Studies, Duke University: A cultural history of the banjo.

=== E ===
- Nancy Easterlin, Professor of English, University of New Orleans: What is literature for?.
- Alexei A. Efros, Assistant Professor of Computer Science and Robotics, Carnegie Mellon University: Inferring geometric, photometric, and semantic scene properties from an image.
- Rodney Evans, Filmmaker, Brooklyn, New York: Filmmaking.

=== F ===
- Xiaohui Fan, Associate Professor of Astronomy, Steward Observatory, University of Arizona: The end of cosmic Dark Ages: beyond the redshift seven barrier.
- James Farquhar (academic), Associate Professor, Earth System Science Interdisciplinary Center and Department of Geology, University of Maryland: Isotopic investigations of microbial sulfur metabolisms.
- Robert Feintuch, Artist, New York City; Senior Lecturer in Art, Bates College: Painting.
- Molissa Fenley, Choreographer, New York City; Artistic Director, Molissa Fenley and Dancers; Associate Professor of Dance, Mills College: Choreography.
- Giovanni R. F. ("John") Ferrari, Professor of Classics, University of California, Berkeley: Fiction and the limits of social meaning.
- Leon Fink, UIC Distinguished Professor, Department of History, University of Illinois, Chicago: Regulating labor in the Atlantic world, 1800-2000.
- Edward Fowler, Writer, Irvine, California; Professor, School of Humanities, University of California, Irvine: A family memoir.
- Mark I. Friedman, Member and Associate Director, Monell Center, Philadelphia: Diet and obesity.
- Victor A. Friedman, Andrew Mellon Professor in Slavic Languages and Literatures, University of Chicago: Multilingualism, identities, and the sociolinguistics of the Balkan Linguistic League.
- Rachel Fulton, Associate Professor of History, University of Chicago: The Virgin Mary and the art of prayer, 1000-1500.
- Joe Fyfe, Painter, Brooklyn, New York; Visiting Assistant Professor, Pratt Institute, Brooklyn: Painting.

=== G ===
- David Galenson, Professor in Economics and the College, University of Chicago: Conceptual revolutions in twentieth-century art.
- Forrest Gander, Poet, Barrington, Rhode Island; Professor of English and Comparative Literature, Brown University: Poetry.
- Sergey Gavrilets, Distinguished Professor, Department of Ecology and Evolutionary Biology, University of Tennessee: The social brain hypothesis: coevolution of genes, memes, and social networks.
- Phoebe Gloeckner, Artist, Ann Arbor, Michigan; Assistant Professor, University of Michigan School of Art and Design: A graphic narrative.
- Laurie R. Godfrey, Professor of Anthropology, University of Massachusetts, Amherst: Reconstructing Madagascar's vanished ecosystems.
- Ann Goldstein, Editor and Translator, New York City; Editor, The New Yorker: The complete works of Primo Levi.
- Elijah Gowin, Photographer, Kansas City, Missouri; Assistant Professor of Art and Art History, University of Missouri, Kansas City: Photography.
- Allan Greer, Professor of History, University of Toronto: The practices of property in colonial North America.
- Wendy Griswold, Professor of Sociology, Northwestern University: The Federal Writers' Project and American regionalism.
- Edith Grossman, Translator, New York City: The "Soledades" of Luis de Góngora.
- Sumit Guha, Professor of History, Rutgers University: Governing Caste: Identity and power in South Asia, 1600-1900.
- Achsah Guibbory, Professor of English, and Chair, Department of English, Barnard College: The uses of Judaism in seventeenth-century England.

=== H ===
- Barbara Hahn, Distinguished Professor of German, Vanderbilt University: Hannah Arendt's literature.
- Roya Hakakian, Writer, Woodbridge, Connecticut: The Assassins of the Turquoise Palace.
- David M. Halperin, W. H. Auden Collegiate Professor of the History and Theory of Sexuality, University of Michigan, Ann Arbor: How to be gay.
- William M. Hamlin, Professor of English, Washington State University: A history of John Florio's Montaigne.
- Saar Harari, Choreographer, New York City; Artistic Director, LeeSaar The Company: Choreography.
- Donald Harper, Professor, Department of East Asian Languages and Civilizations, University of Chicago: China in the age of manuscripts, fourth century B.C. to tenth century A.D.
- Susanna B. Hecht, Professor of Urban Planning, University of California, Los Angeles: Deforestation in the rubber boom of the upper Amazon.
- Robin Hemley, Professor of English and Director, Nonfiction Writing Program, University of Iowa: Revisiting one's own youth.
- Denise L. Herzing, Research Director, Wild Dolphin Project, Jupiter, Florida; Research Faculty Member, Department of Biological Sciences, Florida Atlantic University: Underwater observations of wild dolphins.
- Sue Hettmansperger, Artist, Iowa City, Iowa; Professor of Painting and Drawing, University of Iowa, Iowa City: Painting.
- Bob Hicok, Poet, Blacksburg, Virginia; Associate Professor of Creative Writing, Virginia Polytechnic Institute and State University: Poetry.
- Martha Himmelfarb, William H. Danforth Professor of Religion, Princeton University: Jewish eschatology and Christian empire.
- Danny Hoch, Playwright, Brooklyn, New York: Drama.
- Woody Holton, Associate Professor of History, University of Richmond: Abigail Adams, entrepreneur.
- Michael E. Hood, Assistant Professor of Biology, Amherst College: Evolutionary ecology of a global disease distribution.
- Daniel Horowitz, Mary Huggins Gamble Professor of American Studies, Smith College: Understanding consumer culture, 1951-2001.
- Yonggang Huang, Joseph Cummings Professor, R. McCormick School of Engineering and Applied Science, Northwestern University: Atomistic-based continuum theory for nano-structured materials.
- Sedrick Ervin Huckaby, Artist, Fort Worth, Texas; Adjunct Professor, University of Texas, Arlington: Painting.
- James Hyde, Painter, Brooklyn, New York: Painting.

=== I ===
- Torben Iversen, Harold Hitchings Burbank Professor of Political Economy, Department of Government, Harvard University: Democracy, distribution, and the representation of economic interests.

=== J ===
- Bahram Javidi, Board of Trustees Distinguished Professor, University of Connecticut: Real-time automated detection and identification of biological microorganisms.
- Margo Jefferson, Associate Professor, Eugene Lang College, The New School University; Professor of Professional Practice, Columbia University: Race: composition and improvisation.
- Paul Christopher Johnson, Associate Professor, Center for Afroamerican and African Studies, and Department of History, and Director, Doctoral Program in Anthropology and History, University of Michigan, Ann Arbor: "Religion" and the purification of spirits.

=== K ===
- Robert Kanigel, Professor of Science Writing, Massachusetts Institute of Technology: On an Irish island.
- Sean Keilen, Lecturer in English, Princeton University: Imitation and tradition in Renaissance poetry.
- Martin Kersels, Artist, Sierra Madre, California; Codirector and Faculty Member, Program in Art, California Institute of the Arts: Installation art.
- Chandrashekhar B. Khare, Professor of Mathematics, University of California, Los Angeles: Motives, Galois representations, and automorphic forms.
- Laura L. Kiessling, Hilldale Professor of Chemistry and Biochemistry and Laurens Anderson Professor of Biochemistry, University of Wisconsin: Chemoselective reactions for biology.
- Matthew Klam, Writer, Washington, DC; Visiting Associate Professor, Stony Brook University: Fiction.
- Anthony Korf, Composer, New York City; Artistic Director, Riverside Symphony, New York City: Music composition.

=== L ===
- Elizabeth LeCompte, Theater Artist, New York City; Founding Member and Artistic Director, The Wooster Group: Drama.
- Michael Leja, Professor, History of Art Department, University of Pennsylvania: The flood of pictures in the mid-nineteenth century.
- Simon Leung, Artist, Los Angeles, California; Associate Professor of Studio Art, University of California, Irvine: Post-studio art.
- Beth Levin, William H. Bonsall Professor in the Humanities, Stanford University: Crosslinguistic variation in event encoding.
- Builder Levy, Photographer, New York City: Photography.
- Michael J. Lewis, Faison-Pierson-Stoddard Professor of Art, Williams College: The pietist tradition in town planning.
- Pam Lins, Sculptor, Brooklyn, New York; Adjunct Professor, Cooper Union School of Art: Sculpture.
- Sam Lipsyte, Writer, New York City; Assistant Professor, School of the Arts, Columbia University: Fiction.
- Shawn R. Lockery, Professor and Associate Director, Institute of Neuroscience, University of Oregon: Recordings of neuronal activity and behavior in freely moving animals.
- Vyvyane Loh, Writer, Watertown, Massachusetts: Fiction.

=== M ===
- Glen M. MacDonald, Professor of Geography, University of California, Los Angeles: Climate warming, epic drought, and society.
- Janet Maguire, Composer, Venice, Italy: Music composition.
- Anne Makepeace, Filmmaker, Lakeville, Connecticut; Director, Writer, and Producer, Anne Makepeace Productions, Inc: Filmmaking.
- Paolo Mancosu, Professor of Philosophy, University of California, Berkeley: The interplay between philosophy of mathematics and mathematical logic.
- Fredrik Marsh, Photographer, Columbus, Ohio; Senior Lecturer in Art, Otterbein College: Photography.
- Jack Marshall, Writer, El Cerrito, California: Poetry.
- Tim Maudlin, Professor II of Philosophy, Rutgers University: New foundations for physical geometry.
- Jane Mayer, Writer, Chevy Chase, Maryland; Staff Writer, The New Yorker Magazine: How America lost its way in fighting terrorism.
- Judith Mayne, Distinguished Humanities Professor of French, Ohio State University: Continental films and French Occupation cinema.
- Anthony McCall, Artist, New York City: Installation art.
- Joanne Meyerowitz, Professor of History and American Studies, Yale University: Explaining human difference.
- Greg Miller, Photographer, Brooklyn, New York: Photography.
- Don Mitchell, Distinguished Professor, Department of Geography, Maxwell School, Syracuse University; Visiting Scholar, Annenberg School, University of Pennsylvania: Bracero: remaking the California landscape, 1942-1964.
- Rebecca Morris, Artist, Los Angeles, California; Associate Professor of Painting, Pasadena City College: Painting.
- Samuel Moyn, Professor of History, Columbia University: Human rights between morality and politics.
- Carlos Motta, Artist, New York City: Installation Art and Video

=== N ===
- Ardine Nelson, Photographer, Columbus, Ohio; Associate Professor, Department of Art, Ohio State University: Photography.
- John Wallace Nunley, Independent scholar, St. Louis, Missouri: African art and the experience of slavery.

=== O ===
- Ruben Ochoa, Artist, Los Angeles, California; Adjunct Professor in Sculpture, University of California, Irvine: Installation art.
- Peter Ozsváth, Professor of Mathematics, Columbia University: Heegaard diagrams and holomorphic disks.

=== P ===
- Myrna Packer/Art Bridgman, Choreographers, Valley Cottage, New York; Codirectors, Bridgman/Packer Dance: Choreography.
- Richard Panek, Writer, New York City: At the dawn of the next universe.
- Richard H. Pildes, Sudler Family Professor of Constitutional Law, New York University School of Law: Political power, democratic politics, and constitutional theory.
- Claire Preston, Fellow and Lecturer in English, Sidney Sussex College, University of Cambridge: English literature and scientific investigation in the seventeenth century.
- Richard Primus, Professor of Law, University of Michigan: Constitutional authority in the wake of civil war.

=== R ===
- Andrew Stein Raftery, Artist, Providence, Rhode Island; Associate Professor of Printmaking, Rhode Island School of Design: Engraving.
- Rufus Reid, Composer, Bassist, and Clinician, Teaneck, New Jersey: Music composition.
- Enrico Riley, Artist, Norwich, Vermont; Senior Lecturer and Area Head of Painting and Drawing, Dartmouth College: Painting.
- Lance Rips, Professor of Psychology, Northwestern University: Concepts of individuals and their persistence.
- Oren D. Rudavsky, Filmmaker, New York City: Filmmaking.
- Paul Rudy, Composer, Kansas City, Missouri; Associate Professor and Coordinator of Composition, Conservatory of Music and Dance, University of Missouri, Kansas City: Music composition.
- John Gerard Ruggie, Kirkpatrick Professor of International Affairs, Kennedy School of Government, Harvard University: Governing multinationals: the case of human rights.
- Ben Russell, Filmmaker, Chicago, Illinois; Visiting Assistant Professor in Moving Image, University of Illinois: Filmmaking.
- Nancy Ruttenburg, Professor of Comparative Literature, English, and Slavic Literatures, and Chair, Department of Comparative Literature, New York University: Dostoevsky and the culture of American democracy.

=== S ===
- Lisa Sanditz, Artist, Tivoli, New York: Painting.
- Sigrid Sandström, Artist, Tivoli, New York; Assistant Professor of Studio Arts, Bard College: Painting.
- Philip W. Scher, Associate Professor of Anthropology, University of Oregon: Tourism, the state, and the performance of identity in the neoliberal Caribbean.
- Jeffrey Schiff, Artist, Brooklyn, New York; Professor of Art, Wesleyan University: Sculpture.
- Laura Schwendinger, Composer, Madison, Wisconsin; Associate Professor of Composition, University of Wisconsin, Madison: Music composition.
- Reginald Shepherd, Poet, Pensacola, Florida; Associate Poetry Faculty, Low-Residency MFA Program, Antioch University: Poetry.
- Vicky Shick, Choreographer, New York City: Choreography.
- Arthur P. Shimamura, Professor of Psychology, University of California, Berkeley: A neurocognitive approach to the psychology of art and aesthetics.
- Gary Shiu, Associate Professor of Physics, University of Wisconsin, Madison: Connecting string theory to experiment.
- Kathryn Sikkink, Regents Professor and McKnight Distinguished University Professor, University of Minnesota: The origins and effects of human rights trials in the world.
- Susan S. Silbey, Leon and Anne Goldberg Professor of Humanities and Professor of Sociology and Anthropology, Massachusetts Institute of Technology: Trust and surveillance in the cultures of science.
- Kaja Silverman, Class of 1940 Professor of Rhetoric, Film, and Art History, University of California, Berkeley: The miracle of analogy.
- Ruth Lewin Sime, Professor Emeritus, Department of Chemistry, Sacramento City College: A biographical study of Otto Hahn.
- Paul Sorrentino, Professor of English, Virginia Tech: The life of Stephen Crane.
- Alan M. Stahl, Curator of Numismatics, Princeton University: The nexus of wealth and power in medieval Venice.
- Kurt Stallmann, Composer, Houston, Texas; Assistant Professor and Lynette S. Autrey Chair, Shepherd School of Music, Rice University: Music composition.
- Alexander Stille, San Paolo Professor of International Journalism, Graduate School of Journalism, Columbia University: Family matters: a memoir.
- Katherine V. W. Stone, Professor of Law, University of California, Los Angeles: The remaking of labor relations in the twenty-first century.
- Peter Stone, Associate Professor of Computer Sciences, University of Texas, Austin: Ad hoc teams of mobile robots.
- Robin Stryker, Professor of Sociology and Affiliated Professor of Law, University of Minnesota, Minneapolis: Social science in government regulation of equal employment opportunity.
- Marc A. Suchard, Assistant Professor of Biomathematics, Biostatistics, and Human Genetics: Towards solutions to the fundamental problems in statistical phylogenetics.

=== T ===
- David J. Taylor, Photographer, Las Cruces, New Mexico; Associate Professor of Photography, New Mexico State University, Las Cruces: Photography.
- Keith Terry, Choreographer, Musician, and Dancer, Oakland, California; Artistic Director, Crosspulse: Choreography.
- Christian Tomaszewski (C.T. Jasper), Artist, Brooklyn, New York; Lecturer in the Program in the Visual Arts, Princeton University: Fine arts.
- Anton Treuer, Associate Professor of Ojibwe, Bemidji State University: Ojibwe grammar project.
- Marc Trujillo, Artist, Sherman Oaks, California; Professor of Drawing and Painting, Santa Monica College: Painting.

=== V ===
- Alexander van Oudenaarden, Associate Professor of Physics, Massachusetts Institute of Technology: Stochastic gene expression in development.
- Ashutosh Varshney, Professor of Political Science, University of Michigan: Cities and ethnic conflict: a multi-country study.
- Mary Kay Vaughan, Professor of History, University of Maryland: Intimate paths to Mexico 1968.
- Val Vinokur, Assistant Professor of Comparative Literature, Eugene Lang College, The New School: A translation of Marie Vieux Chauvet's Love, Anger, Madness.

=== W ===
- Roger D. Waldinger, Distinguished Professor, Department of Sociology, University of California, Los Angeles: America's new immigrants and their homeland connection.
- Nicholas Watson, Professor of English and American Literature and Language, Harvard University: Vernacular theology and the secularization of England, 1050-1550.
- Sarah Watts, Professor of History, Wake Forest University: The political satires of Lyonel Feininger.
- Andrew Weaver, Professor, School of Earth and Ocean Sciences, University of Victoria, British Columbia, Canada: Biogeochemical feedbacks on polar climate stability.
- Jonathan Weiner, Professor, Graduate School of Journalism, Columbia University: A book about science and art.
- Barbara (Bobbi) Wolfe, Professor of Economics, Population Health Sciences, and Public Affairs, University of Wisconsin, Madison: Understanding the tie between income and health disparities.
- Linda Woodbridge, Josephine Berry Weiss Chair in the Humanities and Professor of English, Pennsylvania State University: English revenge drama.

=== Y ===
- Donald A. Yates, Writer and Translator, St. Helena, California; Professor Emeritus of Latin American Literature, Michigan State University: Jorge Luis Borges: A life in letters.
- Pamela Yates, Filmmaker, New York City; President and Cofounder, Skylight Pictures, Inc: Filmmaking.
- Kevin A. Yelvington, Associate Professor of Anthropology, University of South Florida: Melville J. Herskovits and the making of Afro-American anthropology.
- Rachel P. Youens, Artist, Brooklyn, New York; Adjunct Lecturer, Parsons School of Design; Adjunct Assistant Professor, LaGuardia Community College, City University of New York: Painting and sculpture.
- Jason X.-J. Yuan, Professor of Medicine, University of California, San Diego: Role of ion channels in stem cell proliferation and differentiation.

=== Z ===
- Bill Zavatsky, Poet, New York City; Teacher of English, Trinity School, New York City: Poetry.
- Miguel Zenón, Composer, New York City: Music composition.
- Li Zhang, Associate Professor of Anthropology, University of California, Davis: The rise of psychotherapy in post-reform China.
- Thad Ziolkowski, Writer, Brooklyn, New York; Associate Professor of English and Humanities, and Director, Writing Program, Pratt Institute: Fiction.
- Lisa Zunshine, Professor of English, University of Kentucky.

== See also ==
- Guggenheim Fellowship
