= Himmelfarb =

Himmelfarb or Himelfarb is a Ashkenazi Jewish ornamental surname composed of Himmel ('sky') + Farb ('color').<ref>Himmelfarb Surname Meaning, Dictionary of American Family Names, p.179 Notable people with the surname include:

- Alex Himelfarb (born 1947), Canadian civil servant and academic
- Eric Himelfarb (born 1983), Canadian ice hockey player
- Gary Himelfarb (Doctor Dread) (born 1954), a reggae producer
- George Him (1900–1982), Polish-British designer born Jerzy Himmelfarb
- Gertrude Himmelfarb (1922–2019), American historian
- Martha Himmelfarb (born 1954), American scholar of religion and Judaism
- Milton Himmelfarb (1918–2006), American sociographer

== See also ==
- Himmelfarb Health Sciences Library, George Washington University
