= Robert J. Silbey =

American theoretical chemist (1940–2011)

- Born: October 19, 1940; Brooklyn, New York, U.S.
- Died: October 27, 2011 (aged 71); Cambridge, Massachusetts, U.S.
- Education: Brooklyn College; University of Chicago
- Known for: Energy and electron transfer in condensed phases Exciton theory Conjugated polymers
- Scientific career
- Fields: Physical chemistry, theoretical chemistry
- Workplaces: Massachusetts Institute of Technology

Robert James Silbey (October 19, 1940 – October 27, 2011) was an American theoretical chemist at the Massachusetts Institute of Technology (MIT). His research focused on the theory of electronic processes in condensed phases, including energy and electron transfer, exciton dynamics, and the optical properties of molecular systems. He was elected to the National Academy of Sciences in 2003.

== Early life and education ==
Silbey was born in Brooklyn, New York, the son of Sidney and Estelle Silbey. He attended public schools in New York City and earned a bachelor's degree from Brooklyn College in 1961. He completed his Ph.D. in chemistry at the University of Chicago in 1965.

After a postdoctoral appointment at the University of Wisconsin with Joseph O. Hirschfelder, he joined the MIT faculty in 1966.

== Career and research ==
Silbey spent his entire academic career at MIT, where he served as head of the Department of Chemistry from 1990 to 1995, director of the Center for Materials Science and Engineering from 1998 to 2000, and dean of the School of Science from 2000 to 2007.

His research addressed theoretical problems in condensed-phase chemistry, often in close interaction with experimental work. He made contributions to the theory of electronic excitation in molecular crystals, energy transfer processes, and the interaction of electronic and vibrational degrees of freedom in condensed systems.

Early in his career, Silbey developed quantum-mechanical treatments of excitations in molecular crystals, including analyses of exciton band structure and charge transport. He later extended this work to exciton–phonon coupling and energy transfer in disordered systems and molecular aggregates.

He also contributed to the theory of conjugated polymers, including calculations of electronic structure and optical properties, and analyses of nonlinear optical behavior in such materials. His work on single-molecule spectroscopy addressed fluctuations, line shapes, and photon emission dynamics in condensed environments.

In later work, he studied energy and charge transfer in photosynthetic systems, including the role of coherence and environmental fluctuations in excitation transport.

== Teaching and administration ==
Silbey was known at MIT for undergraduate and graduate teaching in physical chemistry. He coauthored the textbook Physical Chemistry with Robert A. Alberty and Moungi Bawendi, based on his lecture courses.

As an administrator, he served as dean of the School of Science during a period that included new faculty initiatives and construction projects. He was also involved in efforts to address the status of women faculty in science at MIT.

== Honors and awards ==
Silbey was elected to the National Academy of Sciences in 2003. He was also a fellow of the American Academy of Arts and Sciences (elected 1991), the American Association for the Advancement of Science, and the American Physical Society (elected 1980).

His awards included the Max Planck Research Award and the J. O. Hirschfelder Prize in Theoretical Chemistry.

== Personal life ==
Silbey was married to sociologist Susan Silbey and had two daughters. He died on October 27, 2011, in Cambridge, Massachusetts.
