= Rachel Elior =

Israeli professor of Jewish philosophy

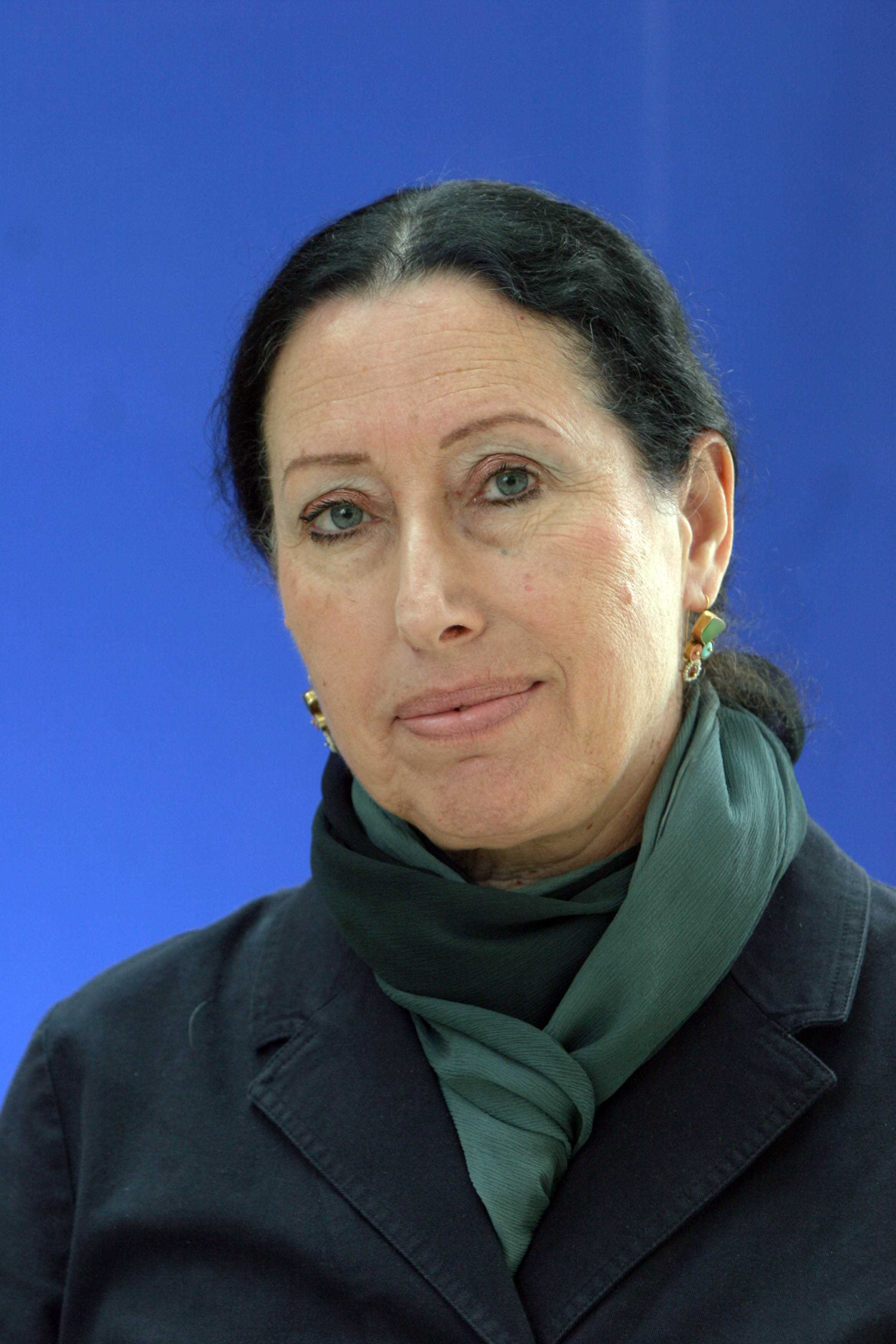
Rachel Elior

Rachel Elior (Hebrew: רחל אליאור; born 28 December 1949) is an Israeli professor of Jewish philosophy at the Hebrew University of Jerusalem. Her principal subjects of research have been Hasidism and the history of early Jewish mysticism.

== Academic career ==
Elior is the John and Golda Cohen Professor of Jewish Philosophy and Jewish Mystical Thought at the Hebrew University, where she has taught since 1978. Currently she is the head of the Department of Jewish Thought. She earned her PhD Summa cum laude in 1976. Her specialties are early Jewish Mysticism, the Dead Sea Scrolls, Hekhalot literature, Messianism, Sabbatianism, Hasidism, Chabad, Frankism and the role of women in Jewish culture.

She has been a visiting professor at Princeton University, UCL, Yeshiva University, the University of Tokyo, Doshisha University in Kyoto, Case Western Reserve University in Cleveland, in the University of Chicago and at the University of Michigan-Ann Arbor.

She is a member of the board of the international council of the New Israel Fund.

== Awards and recognition ==
In 2006, Elior received the Gershom Scholem Prize for Research in Kabbalah from the Israel Academy of Sciences and Humanities. Works

Abyss Calls to Abyss: Essays and Reflections on Books, Stories, Writers, and Literature. Edited by Ofer Chen. Emda Publishing, 2025. This volume brings together Rachel Elior's literary essays and critical reflections. Spanning more than three decades, the anthology includes her writings on authors whose works have profoundly shaped modern Jewish and Hebrew culture, among them S. Y. Agnon, Bruno Schulz, Amalia Kahana-Carmon, Dahlia Ravikovitch, Meir Shalev, Haim Be'er, Haim Gouri, Amos Oz, Assaf Inbari, and Ze'ev Raz. In addition to exploring the emotional and personal dimensions of these writers' lives and works, Elior situates these works within the broader cultural, social, and historical contexts in which they were conceived.

== Criticism and controversy ==
Rachel Elior's research into Hasidism and the Dead Sea Scrolls has elicited a range of scholarly responses, marking her work as a significant point of contention and endorsement within academic circles.

=== Hasidism ===
Yohanan Petrovsky-Shtern, a Professor at Northwestern, critiques Elior's approach to Hasidism, stating, "Elior uses a rather outdated concept of the [hasidic] movement to cement her narrative. She leaves aside theories, ideas, insights, and data amassed by scholars who have long departed from the thinking patterns of Dinur or Scholem." And that Elior, among others, "should revisit [the early writers of hasidic stories'] conceptual framework, in which sources coexist in a nontemporal fashion and freely talk to one another, as ideas in the Platonic world of forms."

=== Dead Sea Scrolls ===
Her notion of the origins of mysticism in the priestly class has been challenged by professor Yehuda Liebes of the Hebrew University, and her understanding of the ancient calendar was rejected by Sacha Stern. Eibert Tigchelaar noted that her examples have a "lack of historical specificity that are disturbing and frustrating." Nonetheless, Joseph Dan defends Elior, while Princeton professor Peter Schaefer criticizes her for blurring distinctions between texts and periods, and is not sensitive to important nuances, noting that her views of angels at Qumran and the calendar are wrong. Professor Martha Himmelfarb finds Elior's work "simply untenable", stating that Elior creates tenuous links and historical connections without a basis.

Elior has posited that the Essenes, traditionally considered the authors of the Dead Sea Scrolls never existed, suggesting instead (as have Lawrence Schiffman, Moshe Goshen-Gottstein, Chaim Menachem Rabin, and others) that they were really the renegade sons of Zadok, a priestly caste banished from the Temple of Jerusalem by Greek rulers in 2nd century BC. She conjectures that the scrolls were taken with them when they were banished. "In Qumran, the remnants of a huge library were found," Elior says, with some of the early Hebrew texts dating back to the 2nd century BC. Until the discovery of the Dead Sea Scrolls, the earliest known version of the Old Testament dated back to the 9th century AD. "The scrolls attest to a biblical priestly heritage," says Elior, who speculates that the scrolls were hidden in Qumran for safekeeping. In contrast, James Charlesworth, director of the Dead Sea Scrolls Project and professor at Princeton Theological Seminary, states there is "significant evidence for the Essenes’ existence" and "It is impossible that Josephus created a group already mentioned by Philo, who had visited Jerusalem," arguing against Elior's conclusion. Princeton religion professor Martha Himmelfarb said she doesn’t think Elior’s work is as "historically informed" as other research on the Scrolls, saying, "[Elior] does not tend to engage the historical nitty-gritty that other scholars’ work does."

== See also ==
- Moshe Idel
- Ada Rapoport-Albert

== Bibliography ==
- Israel Ba'al Shem Tov and his Contemporaries, Kabbalists, Sabbatians, Hasidim and Mithnagdim, Jerusalem : Carmel Publication House 2014
- Memory and Oblivion: The Secret of the Dead Sea Scrolls, Van Leer Institute and Hakibutz haMeuchad, 2009
- The Dybbuk and Jewish Women, Jerusalem and New York, Urim Publications, 2008. ISBN 978-965-524-007-8.
- Elior, Rachel (2007). Jewish Mysticism: The Infinite Expression of Freedom, trans.Yudith Nave and Arthur B. Millman. Portland, Oregon: Littman Library of Jewish Civilization. ISBN 978-1-874774-67-9. OCLC 76184139.
- Elior, Rachel (2006). The Mystical Origins of Hasidism. trans. Shalom Carmy. Portland, Oregon: Littman Library of Jewish Civilization. ISBN 1-874774-84-6. OCLC 65978708.
- Heikhalot Literature and Merkavah Tradition Ancient Jewish Mysticism and its Sources, Tel Aviv: Yediot Ahronot; Sifrei Hemed: 2004 (Hebrew) ISBN 978-965-511-145-3
- Elior, Rachel (2004). The Three Temples: On the Emergence of Jewish Mysticism. Portland, Oregon: Littman Library of Jewish Civilization. ISBN 1-874774-66-8. OCLC 53223716.
- Herut al Haluhot – Studies in the Mystical Foundations of Hasidism, Tel Aviv: Broad Cast University: Defense Ministry Press 1999.
- Paneiah ha-Shonot shel ha-Herut -Iyunim be-Mistika Yehudit (Alpayim 15, Am Oved 1998)
- Elior, Rachel (1993). The Paradoxical Ascent to God: The Kabbalistic Theosophy of Habad Hasidism. Albany, New York: State University of New York Press. ISBN 0-7914-1045-5. OCLC 24378568.
- Torat HaElohut BaDor haSheni shel Hasidut Habad, Jerusalem: Hebrew University: Magnes Press 1982 (Hebrew)
- Heikhalot Zutarti: An Early Mystical Manuscript of the Mishnaic Talmudic Period, Jerusalem: Hebrew University: Magnes Press 1982 (Hebrew)
- Galia Raza: 16th Century Kabbalistic Manuscript, Jerusalem: Hebrew University 1981 (Hebrew)
- Yehudah Liebes, "Children of the sun vs. children of the moon" Haaretz 4/6/2003
- Sacha Stern, "Rachel Elior on Ancient Jewish Calendars: A Critique" Aleph: Historical Studies in Science and Judaism - Volume 5, 2005, pp. 287–292
- Peter Schaffer, Critical edition of Heikhalot Zutarti, Tarbiz 54 (1985)Hebrew, critical review of her work
- David Tamar, Critical review of her edition of Galia Razia Jerusalem Studies in Jewish Thought 2 Hebrew (1983)
