= Harry Callahan (photographer) =

American photographer and educator (1912–1999)

- Born: Harry Morey Callahan; October 22, 1912; Detroit, Michigan, U.S.
- Died: March 15, 1999 (aged 86); Atlanta, Georgia, U.S.
- Education: Michigan State University
- Occupations: Photographer; educator
- Employers: Institute of Design at the Illinois Institute of Technology, Rhode Island School of Design
- Awards: Edward MacDowell Medal; 1993; National Medal of Arts; 1996

Harry Morey Callahan (October 22, 1912 – March 15, 1999) was an American photographer and educator. He taught at both the Institute of Design at the Illinois Institute of Technology in Chicago, and the Rhode Island School of Design in Providence.

Callahan's first solo exhibition was at the Art Institute of Chicago in 1951. He had a retrospective at the Museum of Modern Art in New York in 1976/1977. Callahan was a recipient of the Edward MacDowell Medal and the National Medal of Arts. He represented the United States in the Venice Biennale in 1978.

== Early life ==
Harry Morey Callahan was born in Detroit, Michigan. He worked at Chrysler when he was a young man then left the company to study engineering at Michigan State University. He dropped out, returned to Chrysler and joined its camera club. Callahan began teaching himself photography in 1938. He formed a friendship with Todd Webb, another budding photographer. A talk given by Ansel Adams in 1941 inspired him to take his work seriously. In 1941, Callahan and Webb visited Rocky Mountain State Park but didn't return with any photographs. In 1946 he was invited to teach photography at the Institute of Design in Chicago by László Moholy-Nagy. He moved to Rhode Island in 1961 to establish a photography program at the Rhode Island School of Design, eventually inviting close friend and fellow artist Aaron Siskind to join him, teaching there until his retirement in 1977.

== Career ==
Callahan left almost no written records—no diaries, letters, scrapbooks or teaching notes. His technical photographic method was to go out almost every morning, walk through the city he lived in and take numerous pictures. He then spent almost every afternoon making proof prints of that day's best negatives. Yet, for all his photographic activity, Callahan, at his own estimation, produced no more than half a dozen final images a year.

He photographed his wife and daughter and the streets, scenes and buildings of cities where he lived, showing a strong sense of line and form, and light and darkness. Even prior to birth, his daughter showed up in photographs of Eleanor's pregnancy. From 1948 to 1953 Eleanor, and sometimes Barbara, were shown out in the landscape as a tiny counterpoint to large expanses of park, skyline or water.

He also worked with multiple exposures. Callahan's work was a deeply personal response to his own life. He encouraged his students to turn their cameras on their own lives, leading by example. Callahan photographed his wife over a period of fifteen years, as his prime subject. Eleanor was essential to his art from 1947 to 1960. He photographed her everywhere—at home, in the city streets, in the landscape; alone, with their daughter, in black and white and in color, nude and clothed, distant and close. He tried several technical experiments—double and triple exposure, blurs, large and small format film.

Callahan was one of the few innovators of modern American photography noted as much for his work in color as for his work in black and white. In 1955 Edward Steichen included his work in The Family of Man, MoMA's popular international touring exhibition.

In 1956, he received the Graham Foundation Award, which allowed him to spend a year in France with his family from 1957 to 1958. He settled in Aix-en-Provence, where he took many photographs.

In 1976 John Szarkowski curated a first major retrospective exhibition of his work at the Museum of Modern Art in New York, accompanied by a book published in conjunction with Aperture. Along with the painter Richard Diebenkorn, he represented the United States in the Venice Biennale in 1978.

In 1994, he selected 130 original prints with the help of the gallery owner Peter MacGill, and brought them together under the name of French Archives, to offer them to the Maison Européenne de la Photographie in Paris. Some of these images were taken in Aix-en-Provence and in the South of France, and were presented at the Granet Museum in Aix-en-Provence in 2019.

Callahan left behind 100,000 negatives and over 10,000 proof prints. The Center for Creative Photography at the University of Arizona maintains his photographic archives. In 2013, Vancouver Art Gallery received a gift of almost 600 Callahan photographs from the Larry and Cookie Rossy Family Foundation.

== Personal life ==
Callahan met his future wife, Eleanor Knapp, on a blind date in 1933. At that time she was a secretary at Chrysler Motors in Detroit and he was a clerk in the parts department. They married three years later. In 1950 their daughter Barbara was born.

Callahan died in Atlanta in 1999. His wife Eleanor died on February 28, 2012, in Atlanta at the age of 95.

== Publications ==
- Harry Callahan. With an introductory essay by Paul Sherman. New York: Museum of Modern Art, 1967. OCLC 283359742. Exhibition catalogue.
- Callahan. Edited with an introduction by John Szarkowski. New York: Museum of Modern Art and Aperture, 1976. ISBN 0-91233475-4. Exhibition catalogue.
- 38th Venice Biennial, 1978: Harry Callahan. Text by Peter Bunnell. New York, NY: International Exhibitions Committee of The American Federation of Arts, 1978. ISBN 0-84780201-9. Exhibition catalogue American Pavillon at the 38th Venice Bienniale.
- Color: 1941–1980. Edited by Robert Tow and Ricker Winsor, with a foreword by Jonathan Williams and an afterword by A. D. Coleman. Providence, R.I.: Matrix Publications, 1980. ISBN 978-0-93655400-6.
- Harry Callahan Photographs: An Exhibition from the Hallmark Photographic Collection. Edited by Keith F. Davis. Kansas City, MO: Hallmark Cards, 1981. ISBN 0-87529606-8. Exhibition catalogue Hallmark Photographic Collection.
- Water's Edge. With an introductory poem by A. R. Ammons and an afterword by Callahan. Lyme, CN: Callaway, 1980. ISBN 9780935112016.
- Eleanor. Edited by Anne Kennedy and Nicholas Callaway, with text by James Alinder. Carmel. CA: Friends of Photography, and New York, NY: Callaway, 1984. ISBN 978-0-93511211-5. Exhibition catalogue Friends of Photography, Carmel.
- New Color: Photographs 1978-1987. Kansas City, MO: Hallmark Cards, 1988. ISBN 978-0-87529624-1.
- Harry Callahan: Photos. With text by Sarah Greenough. Washington, D.C.: National Gallery of Art, 1996. ISBN 978-0-82122313-0. Exhibition catalogue.
- Harry Callahan. (Masters of Photography series). With an essay by Jonathan Williams. New York: Aperture, 1999. ISBN 978-0-89381821-0.
- Nature. Texts by Sarah Greenough, John Szarkowski. Göttingen: Steidl, und New York: Pace/MacGill Gallery, 2007. ISBN 978-3-86-521437-9. Exhibition catalogue.
- Eleanor. Edited by Julian Cox, introduction by Emmet Gowin. Göttingen: Steidl, 2007. ISBN 978-3-86-521464-5. Exhibition catalogue, High Museum of Art, Atlanta and Museum of Art, Rhode Island School of Design
- Seven Collages. With an essay by Julian Cox. Göttingen: Steidl, 2012. ISBN 978-3-86-930140-2.
- Harry Callahan: Retrospective. With essays by Dirk Luckow, Peter MacGill, Sabine Schnakenberg, and Julian Cox. Heidelberg, Germany: Kehrer, 2013. ISBN 978-3-86-828358-7. Exhibition catalogue, Haus der Photographie, Hamburg, Germany.
- The Street. Edited by Grant Arnold. London: Black Dog, 2016. ISBN 978-1-91043358-4. Exhibition catalogue.

== Awards ==
- 1956: Graham Foundation Award
- 1993: Edward MacDowell Medal, MacDowell Colony, Peterborough, NH.
- 1996: National Medal of Arts

== Solo exhibitions ==
- Art Institute of Chicago, Chicago, IL, 1951
- Harry Callahan, Museum of Modern Art, New York, 1976/1977. A retrospective.
- Harry Callahan at 100, National Gallery of Art, Washington, D.C., 2011-2012

== Collections ==
Callahan's work is held in the following permanent collections:

- Art Institute of Chicago: 105 works (as of April 2019)
- George Eastman Museum: 112 works (as of April 2019)
- Museum of Contemporary Photography: 28 works (as of April 2019)
- Museum of Modern Art, New York: 243 works (as of April 2019)
- National Gallery of Art: 191 works (as of August 2025)
- Philadelphia Museum of Art: 151 works (as of September 2019)
