= The Family, Luzzara, Italy =

1953 black and white photograph

The Family, Luzzara, Italy (1953) by Paul Strand

The Family, Luzzara, Italy is a black and white photograph by Paul Strand, taken in 1953. It was made during a five-month stay in Luzzara, in the Po River Valley, north Italy, the birthplace of his friend, screenwriter Cesare Zavattini, which was documented in the book Un Paese (1955), illustrated with his photographs and Zavattini's text. Strand's group of photographs depicts the hardships and conditions of the rural Italy at the time and is directly related to the neorealism esthetic, of which Zavattini was an exponent in cinema.

== Description ==
Strand took aim to the Lusetti family of farmer tenants, who lived in Luzzara. He staged the current photograph. The mother of the family, now a widow, was photographed with his five surviving sons, from a group of eight. Their humble condition is demonstrated by the poor appearance of their family's home. The old matriarch of the family is depicted framed in the door, looking directly to the viewer, while one of her sons appears in profile and looking into her direction. In front of him one of his brothers appears with arms crossed and seated, while also looking at the viewer. Another brother appears seated to his left, looking to the opposite way. To the right, one of the Lusetti brothers is seen with his hands on his pockets, and with his hat on, in front of his bicycle, apparently in a meditative pose. The other brother is depicted at the left side of the photograph, also with his hands on his pockets, while he looks to outside the picture's frame. Their modest condition is attested by the fact that three of the four Lusettis whose feet are shown appear barefeet, while only one is using sandals. The Minneapolis Institute of Art website states that "His contemplative group portrait conveys the individuality of each family member posed around the doorway to their home".

== Art market ==
A print of The Family, Luzzara, Italy sold by $461,000 at Christie's New York, on 6 April 2016.

== Public collections ==
There are prints of this photograph in several public collections, including the Museum of Modern Art, in New York, the National Gallery of Art, Washington, D.C., The Art Institute of Chicago, the Philadelphia Museum of Art, the Museum of Fine Arts, in Boston, the George Eastman House, in Rochester, New York, the Cleveland Museum of Art, the Yale University Art Gallery, the Hallmark Photographic Collection, in the Nelson-Atkins Museum of Art in Kansas City, the San Francisco Museum of Modern Art, and the Amon Carter Museum of Art, in Fort Worth.
