= Emmet Gowin =

American photographer (born 1941)

- Born: Emmet Gowin; 1941 (age 84–85); Danville, Virginia, US
- Known for: Photography
- Spouse: Edith Morris

Emmet Gowin (born 1941) is an American photographer. He first gained attention in the 1970s with his intimate portraits of his wife, Edith, and her family. Later he turned his attention to the landscapes of the American West, taking aerial photographs of places that had been changed by humans or nature, including the Hanford Site, Mount St. Helens, and the Nevada Test Site. Gowin taught at Princeton University for more than 35 years.

== Life and career ==
Gowin was born in Danville, Virginia. His father, Emmet Sr., was a Methodist minister and his Quaker mother played the organ in church. When he was two his family moved to Chincoteague Island, where he spent much of his free time in the marshes around their home drawing animals and plant life. At about age 12 his family moved back to Danville, where Gowin. When he was 16 he saw an Ansel Adams photograph of a burnt tree with a young bud growing from the stump. This inspired him to go into the woods near his home and draw from nature. Later, he applied what he learned from his early years wandering in the woods and marshes to his photography. A student of his said "Photography, with Emmet, became the study of everything."

After graduating from high school he attended the Richmond Professional Institute (now Virginia Commonwealth University). During his first year in college he saw a catalog of the Family of Man exhibit and was particularly inspired by the works of Robert Frank and Henri Cartier-Bresson. About this same time he met his future wife, Edith Morris, who had grown up about a mile away from Gowin in Danville. They married in 1964, and she quickly became both his muse and his model. Later they had two sons, Elijah Gowin (also a photographer in his own right) and Isaac.

Some of his earliest photographic vision was inspired by Edith's large and engaging family, who allowed him to record what he called "a family freshly different from my own." He said "I wanted to pay attention to the body and personality that had agreed out of love to reveal itself." In 1965, Gowin attended the Rhode Island School of Design. While earning his MFA, Gowin studied under influential American photographers Harry Callahan and Aaron Siskind. Three years later he was given his first solo exhibition at the Dayton Art Institute. In 1970 his work was shown at the George Eastman House and a year later at the Museum of Modern Art. About this same time he was introduced to the photographer Frederick Sommer, who became his lifelong mentor and friend.

Gowin was invited by Peter Bunnell in 1973 to teach photography at Princeton University. Over the next 25 years he both taught new students and, by his own admission, continually learned from those he taught. At the end of each academic year he asked his students to contribute one photograph to a portfolio that was open to critique by all of the students; he intentionally included one of his own photographs as a reminder that, while a teacher, "he was just another humble student of art."

Gowin received a Guggenheim Fellowship in 1974, which allowed him to travel throughout Europe. He was also awarded a National Endowment for the Arts Fellowship in 1979 and a Pew Fellowship in the Arts in 1994.

In 1980 Gowin received a scholarship from the Seattle Arts Commission which provided funding for him to travel in Washington and the Pacific Northwest. Beginning with a trip to Mount St. Helens soon after it erupted, Gowin began taking aerial photographs. For the next twenty years, Gowin captured strip mining sites, nuclear testing fields, large-scale agricultural fields and other scars in the natural landscape.

In 1982 the Gowins were invited by Queen Noor of Jordan, who had studied with Gowin at Princeton, to photograph historic places in her country. He traveled there over the next three years and took a series of photographs of the archaeological site at Petra. The prints he made of these images were the first time he introduced photographic print toning in his work.

Gowin retired from teaching at Princeton University at the end of 2009 and lives in Pennsylvania with his wife Edith.

== Style and aesthetics ==
Gowin has acknowledged that the photographs of Eugene Atget, Bill Brandt, Walker Evans, Robert Frank, Alfred Stieglitz, and especially Harry Callahan and Frederick Sommer have influenced him.

Most of his early family pictures were taken with a 4×5 camera on a tripod, a situation in which he said "both the sitter and photographer look at each other, and what they both see and feel is part of the picture." These photos feel both posed and highly intimate at the same time, often capturing seemingly long and direct stares from his wife or her family members or appearing to intrude on a personal family moment. Gowin once said that "the coincidence of the many things that fit together to make a picture is singular. They occur only once. They never occur for you in quite the same way that they occur for someone else, so that in the tiny differences between them you can reemploy a model or strategy that someone else has used and still reproduce an original picture. Those things that do have a distinct life of their own strike me as being things coming to you out of life itself."

In an essay for the catalog for an exhibition of his work at Yale University, writer Terry Tempest Williams said "Emmet Gowin has captured on film the state of our creation and, conversely, the beauty of our losses. And it is full of revelations."

== Publications ==
- Emmet Gowin: Photographs. Emmet Gowin. New York: Knopf, 1976. ISBN 0394401956. (Reprint. Göttingen: Steidl, 2009 ISBN 978-3865218636.)
- emmet gowin. Photographs: 1966-1983. Peter Bunnell and Emmet Gowin. Washington, DC: Corcoran Gallery of Art, 1983 ASIN B000V9QR20. Exhibition also at Princeton University Art Museum Spring 1984.
- Petra. In the Hashemite Kingdom of Jordan. Emmet Gowin. Essay by Phillip C. Hammond. New York: Pace/MacGill Gallery, 1986 ISBN 978-0938608509. Exhibition.
- Emmet Gowin: Photographs. Emmet Gowin. Introduction by Martha Chahroudi. Philadelphia: Philadelphia Museum of Art, 1990. ISBN 0821218352. Exhibition.
- Aerial Photographs. Emmet Gowin. Princeton: Princeton University Art Museum, 1998 ISBN 978-0943012247. Exhibition.
- Emmet Gowin: Changing the Earth: aerial photographs. Emmet Gowin and Jock Reynolds. Essay and interview by Terry Tempest Williams and Philip Brookman. New Haven: Yale University Press, 2002. ISBN 0300093616. Exhibition.
- Emmet Gowin, Photographs: 1967-2000. Tokyo: Nihon University, 2004. Exhibition.
- Mariposas Nocturna ‒ Edith in Panama. Emmet Gowin. New York: Pace/MacGill Gallery, 2006. ASIN B000ESRE4I. Pace/MacGill Gallery exhibition.
- Maggie. Coauthored with Elijah Gowin. Introduction by Edith Gowin. Kansas City: Tin Roof Press, 2008. ISBN 978-0-615-21282-1.
- Emmet Gowin: A Collective Portrait. Princeton: Princeton University Art Museum, 2009. ISBN 094301204X. Exhibition.
- Emmet Gowin. Carlos Gollonet, Keith F. Davis, Emmet Gowin, and Carlos Martin Garcia, authors. Madrid: Fundación Mapfre / New York: Aperture, 2013. ISBN 978-1597112611. (Emmet Gowin's World by Carlos Gollonet; Where Pictures Come From: Sources of Emmet Gowin's Vision by Keith F. Davis; Things Only You Will See by Emmet Gowin; Chronology by Carlos Martin Garcia; as well as uncredited, List of Works.) Exhibition.
- Hidden Likeness: Photographer Emmet Gowin at the Morgan. Emmet Gowin and Joel Smith. New York: The Morgan Library & Museum, 2015. ISBN 978-0875981703 Publication includes plates, interview, and Exhibition Checklist. Exhibition May 22 through September 20, 2015.
- A Shared Elegy. Elijah Gowin - Emmet Gowin/ Osamu James Nakagawa - Takayuki Ogawa. Nanette Esseck Brewer, Joel Smith, and Yoshiko Suzuki. Bloomington : Grunwald Gallery of Art, Sidney and Lois Eskenazi Museum of Art, Indiana University, 2017. ISBN 978-0253032515 Exhibition Grunwald Gallery at Indiana University Bloomington October 13- November 16, 2017.
- Mariposas Nocturnas: Moths of Central and South America, A Study in Beauty and Diversity. Emmet Gowin and Terry Tempest Williams. Princeton and Oxford: Princeton University Press, 2017. ISBN 978-0691176895. (Foreward/ Winged Resistance by Terry Tempest Williams; Mariposas Nocturnas/ Index Plates (fifty-one, each with twenty-five "moth portraits," identifications on facing page) by Emmet Gowin; An Afterword/ Notes from the Field -- Here on Earth Now by Emmet Gowin; Acknowledgements by Emmet Gowin; and An Alphabetical List of Species Names.)
- Here on Earth Now: Notes from the Field. Emmet Gowin. Afterword by Peter MacGill. New York: Pace/MacGill Gallery, 2017. ISBN 978-0692946732. Exhibition at Pace/MacGill Gallery.
- The Nevada Test Site. Emmet Gowin. Foreword by Robert Adams. Princeton and Oxford: Princeton University Press, 2019. ISBN 978-0691196039.

== Exhibitions ==
- Fundación Mapfre, PhotoEspaña festival, Madrid, 2013
