= Bedos =

Bedos is a surname. Notable people with the surname include:

- Guy Bedos (1934–2020), French screenwriter
- Nicolas Bedos (born 1979), French comedian
- Victoria Bedos (born 1984), French author
- Brigitte Bedos-Rezak (born 1953), Historian of France
