= Martha Himmelfarb =

American scholar of religion (born 1952)

Martha Himmelfarb (born 1952) is an American scholar of religion. Her areas of focus include the Second Temple period in Jewish history, Jewish and Christian apocalyptic literature, Hekhalot literature, early Christianity, early rabbinic Judaism after the fall of the Second Temple, and the Jewish priesthood. She became an academic at Princeton University in New Jersey in 1978, and eventually acquired the named chair of William H. Danforth Professor of Religion. She took on emeritus status at Princeton in 2022. Much of Himmelfarb's work is on the intersection of Hellenistic Judaism, Jewish Christianity, and early Christianity in general; she considers older approaches to have overly downplayed early Christianity's Jewish roots and Jewish influences, and advocates that the wider split between Judaism and Christianity occurred more slowly and gradually than traditional views portrayed it.

Her dissertation on the Jewish origins of Christian apocalyptic literature, such as the Apocalypse of Peter and the Apocalypse of Paul would be the foundation of her first scholarly book, Tours of Hell: An Apocalyptic Form in Jewish and Christian Literature, a well-received and influential work published in 1983.

== Biography ==
Martha Himmelfarb was born in 1952 in New York City to the Himmelfarb family, who descended from Russian Jews who emigrated to America. Her father was the sociographer Milton Himmelfarb who worked as director of research at the American Jewish Committee; and her aunt was Gertrude Himmelfarb, also known as Bea Kristol. Her family was not particularly observant to Jewish law, but took seriously Jewish life and culture. She attended White Plains High School, then attended Barnard College for her undergraduate education. She also studied at the Jewish Theological Seminary of America from 1970–1974 and the Hebrew University of Jerusalem in 1972–1973. She received a bachelor's degree majoring in the Greek language from Barnard in 1974, with distinction. In her studies, she also learned Aramaic and Classical Hebrew. She received a PhD from the University of Pennsylvania in 1981, studying under Bob Kraft. Her dissertation on the Jewish origins of Christian apocalyptic literature such as the Apocalypse of Peter and the Apocalypse of Paul would be the foundation of her first scholarly book, Tours of Hell: An Apocalyptic Form in Jewish and Christian Literature, a well-received and influential work published in 1983.

Himmelfarb joined the religion department at Princeton University in 1978, initially as a lecturer; gained a position as assistant professor after completing her PhD in 1981; and was promoted to full professor in 1994. In 1995, Ronald O. Perelman made a major donation to Princeton to establish a school of Judaic Studies, and Himmelfarb was a key player in establishing the academic background of what would become the Princeton program in Jewish studies from its beginnings in 1982 to becoming a full certificate program in 1995. She served as department chair of the Religion Department from 1999 to 2006, and gained the named chair of William H. Danforth Professor of Religion. She was awarded a Guggenheim Fellowship in 2008. She then served as director of Judaic Studies in 2013–2020. She took emeritus status at Princeton in Spring 2022; in her final year she was awarded the Howard T. Behrman Award for Distinguished Achievement in the Humanities, an award given to Princeton faculty.

In 2023, the book Above, Below, Before, and After: Studies in Judaism and Christianity in Conversation with Martha Himmelfarb was published, a festschrift with articles related to Himmelfarb's research and in dialogue with her work.

In Himmelfarb's personal life, she is married to Steven Weiss, a sculptor and draftsman who worked at the Pennsylvania Academy of the Fine Arts. The couple has four children together.

== Selected works ==
Books

- Himmelfarb, Martha (1983). Tours of Hell: An Apocalyptic Form in Jewish and Christian Literature. University of Pennsylvania Press. ISBN 0-8122-7882-8.
- Himmelfarb, Martha (1993). Ascent to Heaven in Jewish and Christian Apocalypses. Oxford University Press. ISBN 0-19-508203-6.
- Himmelfarb, Martha (2006). A Kingdom of Priests: Ancestry and Merit in Ancient Judaism. University of Pennsylvania Press. ISBN 9780812239508.
- Himmelfarb, Martha (2010). The Apocalypse: A Brief History. Wiley Blackwell. ISBN 978-1-444-31822-7.
  - Translated into Japanese in 2013 by Shun'ichi Takayanagi as 黙示文学の世界 (Mokushi bungaku no sekai)
- Himmelfarb, Martha (2013). Between Temple and Torah: Essays on Priests, Scribes, and Visionaries in the Second Temple Period and Beyond. Texts and Studies in Ancient Judaism 151. Mohr Siebeck. ISBN 978-3-16-152139-3.
- Himmelfarb, Martha (2017). Jewish Messiahs in a Christian Empire: A History of the Book of Zerubbabel. Harvard University Press. ISBN 9780674057623.

Articles

- "R. Moses the Preacher and the Testaments of the Twelve Patriarchs." AJS Review, vol. 9, no. 1, 1984, pp. 55–78. JSTOR, http://www.jstor.org/stable/1486438.
- "The Experience of the Visionary and Genre in the Ascension of Isaiah 6-11 and the Apocalypse of Paul". Semeia 36: Early Christian Apocalypticism: Genre and Social Setting. 1986.
- "From Prophecy to Apocalypse: The Book of the Watchers and Tours of Heaven," in Jewish Spirituality I: From the Bible through the Middle Ages, ed. A. Green, New York: Crossroads, 1986, pp. 145–165
- "Heavenly Ascent and the Relationship of the Apocalypses and the 'Hekhalot' Literature." Hebrew Union College Annual, vol. 59, 1988, pp. 73–100. JSTOR, http://www.jstor.org/stable/23507850.
- "The Practice of Ascent in the Ancient Mediterranean World," in Death, Ecstasy, and Other Worldly Journeys, ed. J. J. Collins and M. Fishbane, Albany: SUNY Press, 1995, pp. 121–137
- "Judaism and Hellenism in 2 Maccabees." Poetics Today, vol. 19, no. 1, 1998, pp. 19–40. https://doi.org/10.2307/1773110.
- "Elias Bickerman on Judaism and Hellenism", in The Jewish Past Revisited: Reflections on Modern Jewish Historians, ed. D. N. Myers and D. B. Ruderman, New Haven: Yale University Press, 1998, pp. 199–211
- "Levi, Phinehas, and the Problem of Intermarriage at the Time of the Maccabean Revolt." Jewish Studies Quarterly, vol. 6, no. 1, 1999, pp. 1–24. JSTOR, http://www.jstor.org/stable/40753228.
- "Sexual Relations and Purity in the Temple Scroll and the Book of Jubilees." Dead Sea Discoveries, vol. 6, no. 1, 1999, pp. 11–36. JSTOR, http://www.jstor.org/stable/4193109.
- "The Wisdom of the Scribe, the Wisdom of the Priest, and the Wisdom of the King According to Ben Sira," in For a Later Generation: The Transformation of Tradition in Israel, Early Judaism and Early Christianity, ed. R. A. Argall, B. A. Bow, and R. A. Werline, Harrisburg: Trinity, 2000, pp. 89–99
- "Impurity and Sin in 4QD, 1QS, and 4Q512." Dead Sea Discoveries, vol. 8, no. 1, 2001, pp. 9–37. JSTOR, http://www.jstor.org/stable/4193176.
- "Priests in the Book of the Watchers and the Astronomical Book," Hen 24 (2002), pp. 131–135
- "The Torah between Athens and Jerusalem: Jewish Difference in Antiquity," in Ancient Judaism in Its Hellenistic Context, ed. C. Bakhos, JSJ Sup 95, Leiden: Brill, 2005, pp. 113–129
- "'He Was Renowned to the Ends of the Earth' (1 Maccabees 3:9): Judaism and Hellenism in 1 Maccabees," in Jewish Literatures and Cultures: Context and Intertext, ed. A. Norich and Y. Z. Eliav, BJS 349, Providence: Brown Judaic Studies, 2008, pp. 77–97.
- "'Found Written in the Book of Moses': Priests in the Era of Torah," in Was 70 CE a Watershed in Jewish History?, ed. D. R. Schwartz and Z. Weiss, in collaboration with R. A. Clements, AJEC 78, Leiden: Brill, 2011, pp. 23–41
- "The Mother of the Seven Sons in Lamentations Rabbah and the Virgin Mary." Jewish Studies Quarterly, vol. 22, no. 4, 2015, pp. 325–351. JSTOR, http://www.jstor.org/stable/24751673.
- "3 Baruch Revisited: Jewish or Christian Composition and Why It Matters." In Zeitschrift für Antikes Christentum/Journal of Ancient Christianity 20 2016: pp. 41-62.
- "Abraham and the Messianism of Genesis Rabbah." In Genesis Rabbah in Text and Context, ed. Sarit Kattan Gribetz et al. Tübingen: Mohr Siebeck, 2016. pp. 99-114.
- "'Greater Is the Covenant with Aaron' (Sifre Numbers 119): Rabbis, Priests, and Kings Revisited." In The Faces of Torah: Studies in the Texts and Contexts of Ancient Judaism in Honor of Steven Fraade, ed. Michal Bar-Asher Siegal, Tzvi Novick, and Christine Hayes. Göttingen: Vandenhoeck & Ruprecht, 2017. pp. 339-350.
- "Second Temple Literature outside the Canon." In Early Judaism: New Insights and Scholarship, ed. Frederick E. Greenspahn. New York: New York University Press, 2018.

As an editor

- Boustan, Ra'anan; Himmelfarb, Martha; Schäfer, Peter, eds. (2013). Hekhalot Literature in Context: Between Byzantium and Babylonia. Texts and Studies in Ancient Judaism. Mohr Siebeck.
- Gribetz, Sarit Kattan; Grossberg, David M.; Himmelfarb, Martha; Schäfer, Peter, eds. (2016). Genesis Rabbah in Text and Context. Texts and Studies in Ancient Judaism. Mohr Siebeck.

Festschrift

- Boustan, Ra'anan; Frankfurter, David; Reed, Annette Yoshiko, eds. (2023). Above, Below, Before, and After: Studies in Judaism and Christianity in Conversation with Martha Himmelfarb. Texts and Studies in Ancient Judaism 188. Mohr Siebeck.
