= Darwin and the Darwinian Revolution =

1959 book by Gertrude Himmelfarb

- Cover of the first edition
- Author: Gertrude Himmelfarb
- Language: English
- Subjects: Charles Darwin, Evolution
- Publisher: Chatto & Windus
- Publication date: 1959
- Publication place: United States
- Media type: Print
- Pages: 422

Darwin and the Darwinian Revolution is a 1959 biography of Charles Darwin by the historian Gertrude Himmelfarb. The book has been praised for its historical research but heavily criticized for attacking the theory of natural selection.

== Reception ==
Reviewer Francis G. Townsend described it as a "scholarly book, well organized and well written, interesting to the intelligent reader whatever his special field". Historian Charles F. Mullett also described the book as scholarly but noted that the book contains a "slough of misrepresentation". Himmelfarb insisted to her readers that the theory of natural selection is on shaky ground, but Mullett pointed out that the theory is supported by "numerous experiments and observations [that] have established it most securely".

Historian Charles Coulston Gillispie wrote that, although the book contains well researched history on Darwin, it is a book that is hostile to science. According to Gillispie, "her scientific discussion of the status of the theory of natural selection is simply incorrect".

Anthropologist Neil Tappen has written:

Himmelfarb makes her greatest effort in discussing Darwin's theory of natural selection and arguing against its validity. Here she is at her very worst; her lack of thorough grounding in modern biology becomes painfully evident. She is not aware of the vast weight of genetic evidence against Lamarckian and vitalist doctrines. She claims that there has been no evidence of natural selection in operation. It has been observed through time in numerous organisms, whereas there is an excellent record for several forms, including man... Her ventures into physical anthropology are no less disastrous.

Biologist Ernst Mayr described the book as displaying an "abyss of ignorance and misunderstanding". PZ Myers has criticized the book for utilizing discredited arguments against natural selection, similar to those of creationists.
