= Tony D'Souza =

American novelist

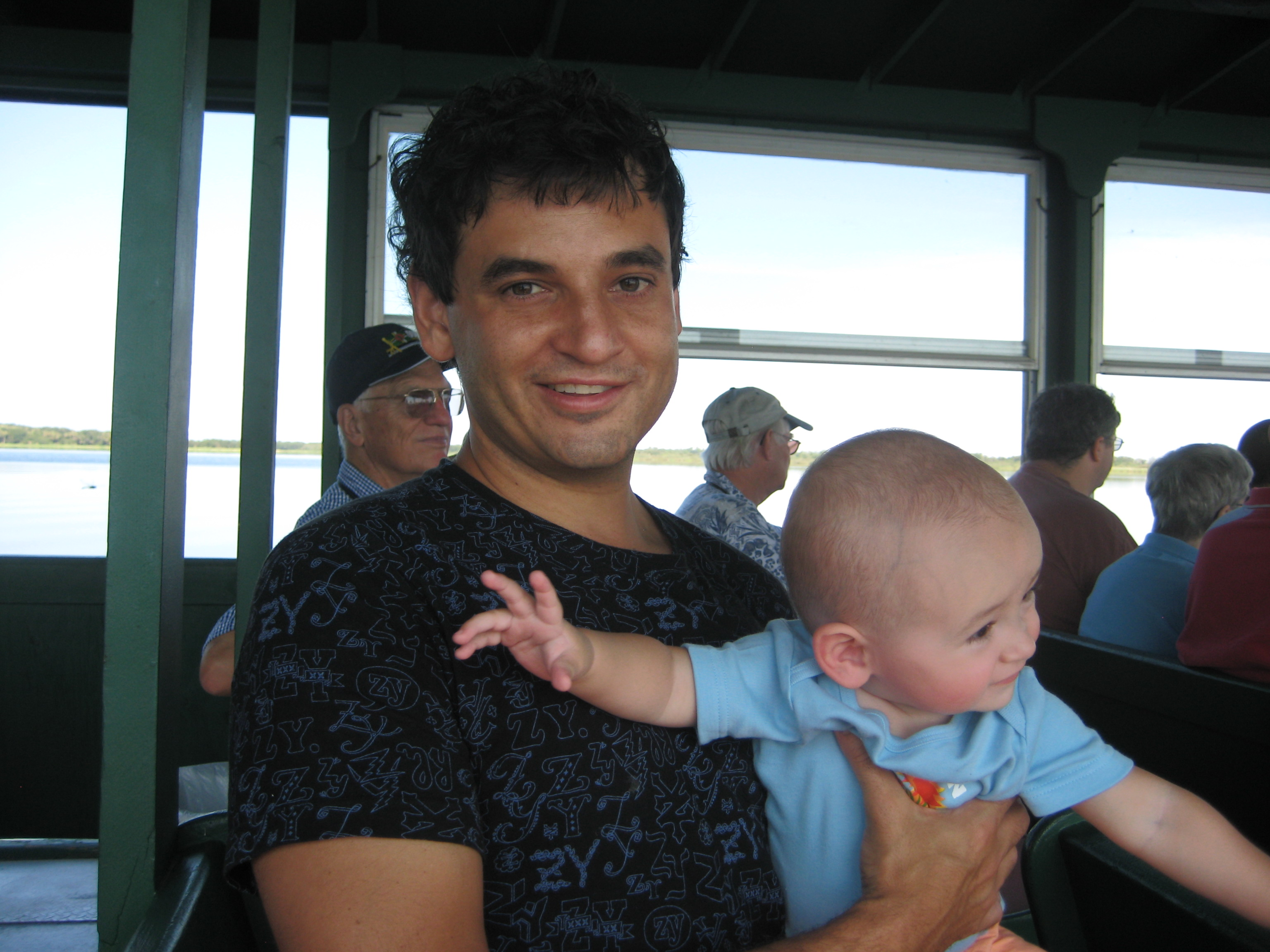
- Born: Chicago
- Education: University of Notre Dame and Hollins University

Tony D'Souza is an American novelist, journalist, essayist, reviewer, travel, and short story writer. He has published three novels with the publisher Houghton Mifflin Harcourt including: Whiteman (2006), The Konkans (2008), and Mule (2011). He sold a feature film adaptation of a Holocaust memoir, Tilli's Story, to Barn 38 Productions as "My Thoughts Are Free" (2017). He ghost wrote Dr. Anna Kohen's Holocaust memoir, "Flower of Flora" (Amsterdam Publishing, 2023), and "Century of Excellence" (2025), a centennial history of the Williams Parker Law Firm.

== Life and career ==
D'Souza was born and raised in Chicago, Illinois. He is multiracial with his father being Mangalorean Catholic and his mother being Euro-American.

While attending Carthage College, he studied fiction. He later earned his master's degree in writing from the University of Notre Dame and Hollins University.

He also served for two and a half years in the Peace Corps, working in Côte d'Ivoire, where he was an AIDS educator. D'Souza is married, and has two children.

His first published story won the Black Warrior Review's award for fiction in 1999. His short story "Club des Amis" was published in The New Yorker, and D’Souza later included the essay as a part of his first novel, Whiteman, published in 2006. Whiteman garnered many awards – Sue Kaufman Prize from the American Academy of Arts and Letters, New York Times Editor's Pick, People Magazine Critic's Choice, the Florida Gold Medal for General Fiction, and was named one of the "greatest fiction travel books of all time" by Condé Nast Traveler.

His second novel, The Konkans, was published in 2008 and was called "best novel of the year" by The Washington Post.

Published in 2011, Mule was praised by Entertainment Weekly, San Francisco Chronicle, Kirkus Reviews, Library Journal, and Booklist. It was also optioned for film by Hunting Lane Films.

D'Souza has received a 2006 NEA Fellowship, a 2007 NEA Japan Friendship Fellowship, and a 2008 Guggenheim Fellowship in Creative Arts-Fiction. His work has appeared in The New Yorker, Playboy, Esquire, Outside, Mother Jones, Salon, Granta, Tin House, and McSweeney's. He detailed his coverage of Nicaragua's Eric Volz murder trial on The Today Show, Dateline, Bill Kurtis Investigates, E! Channel, the BBC, and NPR.

== Bibliography ==
=== Novels ===
- Whiteman (2006)
- The Konkans (2008)
- Mule (2011)
