= Elijah Gowin =

American photographer and educator

Elijah Gowin (born 1967) is an American art photographer and Professor and Chair of the Department of Media, Art and Design at the University of Missouri–Kansas City. He was a 2008 Guggenheim Fellow, during which he worked on a series of photographs, Of Falling and Floating. His work is in the collection of the Los Angeles County Museum of Art. He is the son of photographer Emmet Gowin.

== Early life and education ==
Gowin was born in 1967 in Dayton, Ohio. His father is the photographer Emmet Gowin. He graduated from Davidson College in 1990 with a BA in Art History, and was awarded an MFA in photography from the University of New Mexico (1996).

== Life and work ==
Gowin has taught at University of Tennessee, Chattanooga, St. Mary's College of Maryland, and University of Missouri, Kansas City.

Of Falling and Floating is a series of photographs of people falling, made by collaging scanned photographs and images from the internet and reprinting them as paper negatives. It was exhibited in 2009 at the Griffin Museum of Photography as part of a show called Pull of Gravity. Mark Feeney suggested the images could be read either as representing either negative emotions like "anxiety and dislocation" or positively as images of "buoyancy, even jubilation".

His other series of photographs include Hymnal of Dreams, Watering, and Lonnie Holley. Watering used collaged digital images themed around baptism.

He has had solo shows at Contemporary Art Center of Virginia (Virginia Beach, VA), Vermont Center of Photography (Brattleboro, VT), and the Light Factory (Charlotte, NC).

== Publications ==
- Maggie. Tin Roof, 2009. With Emmet Gowin.
- Of Falling and Floating, Tin Roof, 2011.
- A Shared Elegy, Indiana University Press, 2017

== Collections ==
Gowin's work is held in the following permanent collections:

- Los Angeles County Museum of Art
- Corcoran Gallery of Art
- Center for Creative Photography
