= Ashutosh Varshney =

Political scientist

- Born: 1957 (age 68–69); Uttar Pradesh, India
- Awards: 2008 Guggenheim Fellowship: 2008 Carnegie Scholar; 2003 Gregory Luebbert Prize; 1990 Daniel Lerner Prize

Academic background
- Education: University of Allahabad; Jawaharlal Nehru University, Delhi; MIT

Academic work
- Institutions: Harvard University; University of Michigan; Brown University; Watson Institute
- Main interests: Ethnic and religious conflict

Ashutosh Varshney (born 1957) is an Indian-born political scientist and academic. He is currently the Sol Goldman Professor of International Studies and the Social Sciences and Professor of Political Science at Brown University, where he also directs the Saxena Center for Contemporary South Asia at the Watson Institute for International and Public Affairs. Varshney previously taught at Harvard University and the University of Michigan. He is notable for his contributions to the study of ethnic conflict and civil society, as well as the study of politics in India. He is also a frequent columnist for the Indian Express.

== Early life and education ==
Varshney was born in Uttar Pradesh in 1957. He received Bachelors and master's degrees from the University of Allahabad. He spent a year at Jawaharlal Nehru University before matriculating at the Massachusetts Institute of Technology, where he earned a Sc.M. and Ph.D. in 1985 and 1990, respectively.

== Work ==
Varshney's books include Battles Half Won: India's Improbable Democracy (2013), Collective Violence in Indonesia (2009), Ethnic Conflict and Civic Life: Hindus and Muslims in India (Yale 2002), India in the Era of Economic Reforms (1999), and Democracy, Development and the Countryside: Urban-Rural Struggles in India (Cambridge 1995).

He is currently working on three projects; a multi-country project on cities and ethnic conflict; political economy of urbanization in India; and Indian politics and society between elections.

He served on the former Secretary-General of the United Nations Kofi Annan's Millennium Task Force on Poverty (2002–5). He has also served as an adviser to the World Bank, UNDP and the Club of Madrid.

== Publications ==
- Varshney, Ashutosh (1993). Beyond urban bias. London, England Portland, Oregon: Frank Cass. ISBN 9780714645117. Based on a special issue of the Journal of Development Studies guest edited.
- Varshney, Ashutosh (1998). Democracy, development, and the countryside: urban-rural struggles in India. Cambridge England New York, New York, USA: Cambridge University Press. ISBN 9780521646253. Cambridge University Press, 1995; paperback edition, 1998. Winner of the Daniel Lerner Prize in its PhD dissertation form, MIT, 1990. Indian edition published by Foundation Books (Delhi) in 1996.
- Varshney, Ashutosh; Sachs, Jeffrey D.; Bajpai, Nirupam (2000). India in the era of economic reforms. New Delhi Oxford: Oxford University Press. ISBN 9780195655292.
- Varshney, Ashutosh (2003). Ethnic conflict and civic life: Hindus and Muslims in India. New Haven, Connecticut: Yale University Press. ISBN 9780300100136.
- Varshney, Ashutosh (2004). India and the politics of developing countries: essays in memory of Myron Weiner. New Delhi Thousand Oaks, California: SAGE Publications. ISBN 9780761932888. Based in part on a special issue of Asian Survey.
- Varshney, Ashutosh; Herwitz, Daniel (2008). Midnight's diaspora: critical encounters with Salman Rushdie. Ann Arbor: University of Michigan Press. ISBN 9780472050482.

Reprinted as: Varshney, Ashutosh; Herwitz, Daniel (2009). Midnight's diaspora: critical encounters with Salman Rushdie. Delhi, India: Penguin Viking. ISBN 9780670083435.

- Varshney, Ashutosh (2010). Collective violence in Indonesia. Boulder, Colorado: Lynne Rienner Publishers. ISBN 9781588266873. Based in part on a special issue of the Journal of East Asian Studies, guest edited.
- Varshney, Ashutosh (2014). Battles Half Won: India's Improbable Democracy. Penguin. ISBN 9780143423515.
