= Hallmark Photographic Collection =

The Hallmark Photographic Collection was amassed by Hallmark Cards, Inc. and donated to the Nelson-Atkins Museum of Art in Kansas City, Missouri in December 2005. At the time of donation, the collection consisted of 6,500 images by 900 artists, with an estimated value of $65 million.

The collection spans the history of photography, from 1839 to the present, with works by Southworth & Hawes, Carleton Watkins, Timothy O'Sullivan, Alvin Langdon Coburn, Edward Steichen, Alfred Stieglitz, Dorothea Lange, Harry Callahan, Jerry N. Uelsmann, Lee Friedlander, Andy Warhol, and Cindy Sherman.

First started in 1964, the collection was one of the earliest corporate photography collections. Hallmark vice president David Strout made the first acquisition of 141 prints by Harry Callahan. These were exhibited in New York in fall 1964, at the Hallmark Gallery store at 720 Fifth Avenue. In the next 12-years, bodies of work by major leading photographers, from Edward Weston and Imogen Cunningham to László Moholy-Nagy and Linda Connor were acquired.

Since 1979, the collection was expanded by Keith F. Davis from 650 works by about 35 photographers, to 6,500 works by about 900 artists. He organized dozens of exhibitions from the collection for tours, and authored a number of publications, including An American Century of Photography: From Dry-Plate to Digital, The Hallmark Photographic Collection, 2nd edition (Abrams, 1999). Other publications include Harry Callahan: New Color, Photographs 1978-1987 (1988); George N. Barnard: Photographer of Sherman's Campaign (1990); Clarence John Laughlin: Visionary Photographer (1990); and The Photographs of Dorothea Lange (1995).

To accompany a 2007 exhibition at the Nelson-Atkins Museum, a survey by Davis and Jane L. Aspinwall of the collection's key 19th century contents was published: The Origins of American Photography, 1839-1885, from Daguerreotype to Dry-Plate (2007).
