= William deBuys =

American author and conservationist

William Eno deBuys
- Born: 1949 (age 76–77); Baltimore, Maryland
- Occupations: Author, conservationist

William Eno deBuys (born 1949) is an author and conservationist. He is noted mostly for his non-fiction books about the American southwest, especially New Mexico. He is the author or co-author of ten books and has been an official and activist for several conservation organizations.

DeBuys was born in Baltimore, attended the University of North Carolina, and first came to New Mexico in 1972 along with photographer Alex Harris as a research assistant of Robert Coles of Harvard University. A short story he had written brought him to Coles' attention. About 1975, Harris rented a house in a tiny community called El Valle along the Rio de las Trampas near Las Trampas and invited deBuys and his wife or wife-to-be Anne Cave McLaughlin to stay in the house. DeBuys wrote his first book there, which became his PhD thesis at the University of Texas and was published in 1985.

From 1982 to 1986, deBuys was the director of the Nature Conservancy in North Carolina. His objective of being an author was facilitated by the monetary reward he received for locating the remains of a 1980 airplane crash in the Pecos Wilderness of New Mexico. In 1986, he moved back to New Mexico. In 1991, his book River of Traps was one of three finalists for the Pulitzer Prize in general non-fiction. In this book he described his life in El Valle and his friendship with Jacobo Romero, an elderly Hispano neighbor and farmer. He was also a consultant during these years with the Nature Conservancy and the Conservation Fund. In the late 1990s, he became involved in the acquisition of the 89,000 acres (36,000 ha) Valles Caldera National Preserve and served on the governing Board until 2005. His 2007 book, The Walk describes his life in El Valle. In 2008, he received a Guggenheim Fellowship.

In the 21st century, deBuys undertook two foreign expeditions. In the first, he journeyed to a remote part of Laos to research a book about the Saola, a critically endangered (possibly extinct) bovid. In the second, he traveled to Nepal. His book on the subject was described by Bill McKibben as "an exploration of Nepal, but also of the present and future. Caring for that world, and all that's in it, is necessary, painful, and as he makes clear, exquisitely beautiful work."

== Books ==
- Enchantment and Exploitation: The Life and Hard Times of a New Mexico Mountain Range (1985)
- River of Traps: A Village Life (1990) (with Alex Harris)
- Salt Dreams (1999) (with Joan Myers)
- Valles Caldera: A Vision for New Mexico's National Preserve (2006) (with Don J. Unser)
- The Walk (2007)
- A Great Aridness: Climate Change and the Future of the American Southwest (2011)
- The Last Unicorn: A Search for One of the Earth's Rarest Creatures (2015)
- First Impressions: A Readers Journey to Iconic Places of the American Southwest (with David J. Weber) (2017)
- The Trail to Kanjiroba: Rediscovering Earth in an Age of Loss (2021)
- The Devils Highway: On the Road in the American West (with Joan Myers) (2022)
