= Sarah Watts =

American historian, author, and professor (born 1942)

Sarah Lyons Watts (born 1942) is a history professor at Wake Forest University and author of the critically acclaimed Rough Rider in the White House: Theodore Roosevelt and the Politics of Desire, University of Chicago Press, 2003, and other publications.

In 2008, Sarah Watts was awarded a Guggenheim Fellowship for her work on the early satirical cartoons by the German-American expressionist painter Lyonel Feininger.

Dr. Watts retired from Wake Forest University in the spring of 2007. Her plans at that time were to continue writing for publication. She is also a landscape artist working in oils and pastels.

== Books ==
- Rough Rider in the White House: Theodore Roosevelt and the Politics of Desire. University of Chicago, 2003. ISBN 0-226-87607-1
- Order against Chaos: Business Culture and Labor Ideology in America, 1880-1915. Greenwood, 1990.

"Built Languages of Class: Skyscrapers and Labor Protest in Victorian Public Space" in Roberta Moudry, ed., "Skyscrapers: A Cultural History." Cambridge University Press, 2005.
