= Li Zhang (anthropologist) =

Chinese anthropologist (born 1965)

- 张鹂
- Occupation: Anthropologist
- Awards: Guggenheim Fellowship (2008)

Academic background
- Education: Peking University; University of California, Irvine; Cornell University
- Thesis: Strangers in the city: space, power, and identity in China's "floating population" (1998)
- Doctoral advisor: Steven Sangren

Academic work
- Discipline: Social and Cultural Anthropology
- Sub-discipline: Urban studies, medical and psychological anthropology, labor migration, housing, middle classes, China
- Institutions: UC Davis, Department of Anthropology

Li Zhang (simplified Chinese: 张鹂; traditional Chinese: 張鸝; pinyin: Zhāng Lí) is a Chinese anthropologist based in the United States. Focusing on the social, cultural, spatial, and psychological implications of the reform and opening up, she has written three award-winning books Strangers in the City (2001), In Search of Paradise (2010), and Anxious China (2021). She is a professor at the UC Davis College of Letters and Science Department of Anthropology.

== Biography ==
Li Zhang, who grew up in Kunming, studied at Peking University (where she got her BA in 1987 and MA in 1990), the University of California, Irvine (where she got her second MA in 1993), and Cornell University, where she got her PhD in anthropology in 1998; her doctoral dissertation Strangers in the city: space, power, and identity in China's "floating population" was supervised by Steven Sangren.

For her doctoral dissertation research, Zhang conducted ethnographic fieldwork in Zhejiangcun, where she interviewed rural migrants who had settled there from Zhejiang province. She subsequently complied this research for her doctoral dissertation, which would later be released as her 2001 book Strangers in the City (2001). She worked as a postdoctoral fellow at the Fairbank Center for Chinese Studies from 1998 to 1999, before moving to UC Davis and becoming a professor. She was also director of their East Asian Studies Program from 2003 until 2006, chair of their Department of Anthropology from 2011 until 2015, and interim dean of their Division of Social Sciences from 2015 until 2017.

Zhang was awarded a Guggenheim Fellowship in 2008, to be used for research on the rise of a popular psychological counseling movement in urban China since the 2010s. She won the American Sociological Association Community and Urban Sociology Section's award twice for Outstanding Book in Community and Urban Sociology for her first book Strangers in the City, and her second book In Search of Paradise, which focuses on the privatization of Chinese urban home-ownership and the making of the middle classes. She received an Honorable Mention for the Society for Humanistic Anthropology's Victor Turner Prize for her 2021 book Anxious China. She was president of the Society for East Asian Anthropology from 2013 until 2015.

== Bibliography ==
- Strangers in the City (2001)
- In Search of Paradise (2010)
- Anxious China (2021)
