= Marc Trujillo =

American painter (born 1966)

Marc Trujillo,6800 Hayvenhurst, 2008, oil on canvas

Marc Trujillo (born 1966) is an American painter.

== Artistic Style ==
His paintings depict places common to North American urban and suburban landscapes such as big chain and warehouse stores, gas stations, shopping malls, and chain restaurants.

Trujillo’s paintings are fundamentally synthetic in nature, and represent not only the experience of direct observation, but also an appreciation and awareness of paintings and painters of the past. Each finished painting is the sum of a series of steps that begin with drawing and preparatory sketches. Before beginning the final oil painting, Trujillo completes a grisaille, a monochromatic underpainting that allows him to establish the initial composition of each work.

== Personal ==
Trujillo was born in Albuquerque, New Mexico and currently resides in Los Angeles where he teaches at Santa Monica College. He received his BA in 1991 from the University of Texas at Austin and his MFA in 1994 from the Yale University School of Art where he received the Ely Harwood Schless Memorial Fund Prize as well as the Ellen Battell Stoeckel Trust Fellowship.

== Awards ==
In 2001, Trujillo received the Louis Comfort Tiffany Foundation Award and in 2008, he received the Rosenthal Family Foundation Award in Art from the American Academy of Arts and Letters as well as the John Simon Guggenheim Fellowship.
