= Meiling Cheng =

Taiwanese academic (born 1960)

- 鄭美玲
- Born: 1960 (age 65–66); Taipei, Taiwan
- Occupation: Theatrologist
- Awards: Guggenheim Fellowship (2008)

Academic background
- Education: National Taiwan University (BA); Yale University (MFA, DFA)

Academic work
- Discipline: Performance art studies
- Institutions: Mount Holyoke College; USC School of Dramatic Arts

Meiling Cheng (Chinese: 鄭美玲, romanized: Zhèng Měilíng; born 1960) is a Taiwanese performance arts academic based in the United States. A 2008 Guggenheim Fellow, she is the author of In Other Los Angeleses (2002), Beijing Xingwei (2014), and Reading Contemporary Performance (2015), and she is a professor at the USC School of Dramatic Arts.

== Biography ==
Meiling Cheng, an ethnic Hakka, was born in 1960 in Taipei and later raised there. She later began publishing poetry, fiction, and essays, and she studied at National Taiwan University, where she obtained her Bachelor of Arts degree in 1983.

In 1986, Cheng later moved to the United States, obtaining her Master of Fine Arts in Dramaturgy and Dramatic Criticism in 1989 and Doctor of Fine Arts in Theatre Arts in 1993, both from the Yale School of Drama and on Asian Cultural Council grants. She also had a brief dramaturge career while in Yale, working for Lee Breuer, Brighde Mullins, Lynn Nottage, and August Wilson's The Piano Lesson. After spending a year at Mount Holyoke College as an assistant professor of theatre arts, she moved to the University of Southern California, where she was assistant professor of theatre before being promoted to associate professor in 2000. She was promoted to full professor in 2015 and became the school's head of critical studies in 2019.

As an academic, Cheng specializes in performance art studies. In 2002, she published the book In Other Los Angeleses. In 2004, she started writing essays on Chinese performance art, and in 2008, she was awarded a Guggenheim Fellowship for her book project Beijing Xingwei, where she discusses the role of time-based media in the history of China after Deng Xiaoping; the book was eventually published in 2014. She co-edited the 2015 volume Reading Contemporary Performance. In addition to academia, she also works with live art events.

Cheng is a widow.

== Publications ==
- In Other Los Angeleses (2002)
- Beijing Xingwei (2014)
- Reading Contemporary Performance (2015)
