= Jason X.-J. Yuan =

American physician scientist (born 1963)

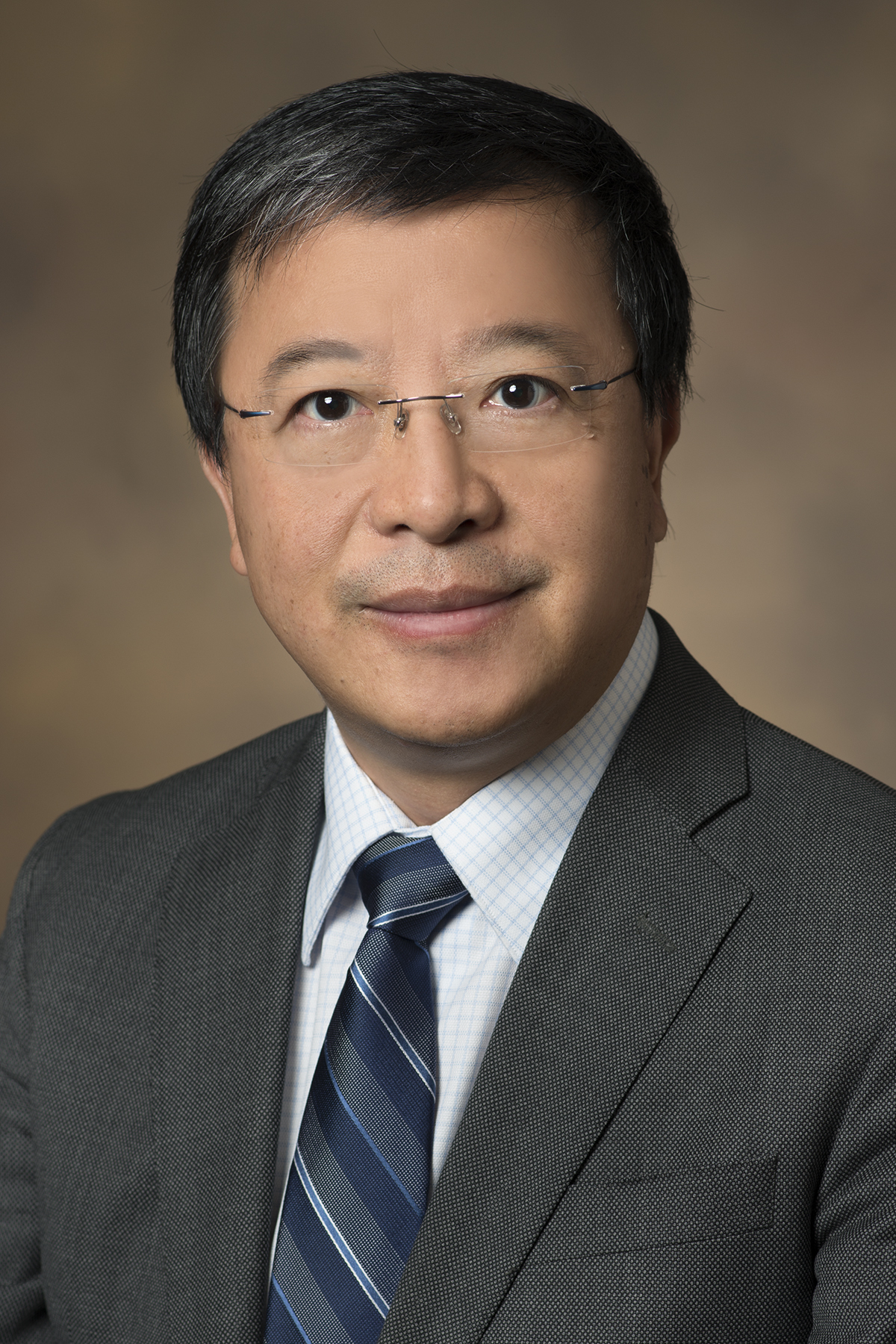
- Born: 1963 (age 62–63); Xintian, Hunan, China: Peking Union Medical College & Chinese Academy of Medical Sciences, Suzhou Medical College,
- Other name: Xiao-Jian Yuan
- Occupation: Associate Vice President For Translational Health Sciences
- Known for: Research on pathogenic mechanisms of idiopathic pulmonary arterial hypertension and pathogenic role of ion channels in the development and progression of pulmonary hypertension
- Scientific career
- Fields: Medicine, Pulmonary and Critical Care Medicine, Translational and Regenerative Medicine, Ion Channel Electrophysiology Vascular Pathophysiology
- Workplaces: University of Arizona (present); University of Illinois at Chicago; University of California, San Diego; University of Maryland, Baltimore

Jason X.-J. Yuan (born 1963) is an American physician scientist whose research interests center on pulmonary vascular pathobiology and pulmonary hypertension. His research is primarily focused on the pathogenic mechanisms of pulmonary vascular diseases and right heart failure.

== Early life and education ==
Yuan was born in 1963 in Xintian County, Hunan Province, China. Yuan completed his medical training at the Suzhou Medical College in 1983, and received his doctoral degree from the Chinese Academy of Medical Sciences and Peking Union Medical College in 1993. He completed his postdoctoral fellowship at the University of Maryland School of Medicine (1988-1991).

== Career ==
Yuan began his academic career as a Research Assistant Professor of Medicine at the University of Maryland School of Medicine (1993-1998) where he established a translational research project using lung tissues and cells isolated from patients with idiopathic pulmonary arterial hypertension to study pathogenic mechanisms of the disease. He received a Parker B. Francis Fellowship from the Francis Families Foundation in 1994 and a Giles F. Filley Memorial Award for Excellence in Respiratory Physiology and Medicine from the American Physiological Society in 1995 for his translational research work. He was also the Winner of the 1995 Cournand and Comroe Young Investigator Award of the American Heart Association.

In 1998, Yuan obtained an Established Investigator Award from the American Heart Association for his pioneer work in identifying novel therapeutic approaches for pulmonary vascular disease. He was recognized as one of the highly promising young investigators in the translational research field of pulmonary vascular disease and right heart failure.

In 1999, Yuan moved to the University of California, San Diego and became a Professor in 2003. His research interest was then extended to study pathogenic and therapeutic mechanisms of chronic thromboembolic pulmonary hypertension, functional role of ion channels in stem cell proliferation and differentiation, and pharmacogenetics associated with idiopathic and associated pulmonary arterial hypertension. While at the University of California, San Diego, he was the Vice Chair for Research of the Department of Medicine (2007-2010) and Associate Director for Research Training in the Division of Pulmonary and Critical Care Medicine (2003-2010).

In July, 2010, Yuan moved to the University of Illinois at Chicago to assume a position of Program Director in the newly established Institute for Personalized Respiratory Medicine (2010-2014). He was also Vice Chair for Scholarly Activities of the Department of Medicine at the College of Medicine and Director of the Program in Pulmonary Vascular Disease and Right Heart Dysfunction at the Center for Cardiovascular Research in the University of Illinois at Chicago. In May, 2010, he was appointed Associate Vice President for Translational Health Sciences of the University of Arizona. At the same time, he became the founding Chief of the Division of Translational and Regenerative Medicine at the Department of Medicine of the College of Medicine.

== Research ==
Yuan's pulmonary vascular disease research propels the field on pathogenic roles of membrane receptors and ion channels and provides a new research direction for developing therapeutic approaches for the disease. He has been continuously funded by the NIH since 1993 when he received his FIRST award.

Yuan is a Fellow of the American Heart Association, the American Association for the Advancement of Science, and the American Physiological Society. He is also a Guggenheim Fellow. He is an elected Member of the American Society for Clinical Investigation and the Association of American Physicians. Yuan has served on many advisory committees and editorial boards, including Chair of the Respiratory Integrative Biology and Translational Research study section of the National Institutes of Health (NIH), and Chair of the Pulmonary Circulation Assembly of the American Thoracic Society. He is currently a regular member of the Vascular Cell and Molecular Biology study section of the NIH, Editor-in-Chief of the journal Pulmonary Circulation, and Associate Editor of the American Journal of Physiology Cell Physiology

He is the leading editor of a comprehensive reference book in the field of pulmonary circulation, Textbook of Pulmonary Vascular Disease (Springer, New York, NY, 2011) and an editor or co-editor of the following books: Hypoxic Pulmonary Vasoconstriction: Cellular and Molecular Mechanisms (Kluwer Academic Publishers, Boston, MA, 2004); Ion Channels in the Pulmonary Vasculature (Taylor & Francis Group, Boca Raton, FL, 2005); Membrane Receptors, Channels, and Transporters in Pulmonary Circulation (Humana Press-Springer, New York, NY, 2010); Advances in the Management of Pulmonary Arterial Hypertension (Future Medicine, London, UK. 2013); and Lung Stem Cells in the Epithelium and Vasculature (Humana Press/Springer Cham Heidelberg New York Dordrecht London, 2015). He is a co-author (with Kim Barrett, Susan Barman and Heddwen Brooks) of Ganong’s Review of Medical Physiology (26th edition) (McGraw Hill Education/Chicago, 2019).

== Journal articles ==
- Google Scholar citations
