= Milton Himmelfarb =

American sociographer (1918–2006)

- Born: October 21, 1918
- Died: January 4, 2006 (aged 87)
- Occupation: Sociographer
- Relatives: Gertrude Himmelfarb (sister)

Milton Himmelfarb (October 21, 1918 – January 4, 2006) was an American sociographer of the American Jewish community.

Himmelfarb worked for four decades at the American Jewish Committee where he was director of information and research services. He edited various versions of the American Jewish Yearbook. He also was a contributing editor of Commentary, the monthly journal of opinion.

In 1986 President Ronald Reagan appointed Himmelfarb to the United States Holocaust Memorial Council. Himmelfarb held several academic posts: visiting professor at the Jewish Theological Seminary and the Reconstructionist Rabbinical College and visiting lecturer at Yale College. He earned a BA in 1938 and MS in 1939 from City College of New York.

Himmelfarb coined the aphorism on the Jewish community's political persuasions: "Jews earn like Episcopalians, and vote like Puerto Ricans." Himmelfarb's sister was the historian Gertrude Himmelfarb. He died in New York City at the age of 87. Through Gertrude, he was the uncle of William and Elizabeth Kristol.

== Selected works ==
- Jews and Gentiles (Encounter Books), 2007,
- American Jewish Year Book (Jewish Publication Society of America, various years)
- The Jews of Modernity (Basic Books, 1973) (ISBN 0-465-03674-0)
- Jews in Unsecular America: Essays (Eerdmans Publishing Co., 1987) (ISBN 0-8028-0206-0)
- Zero Population Growth—For Whom? Differential Fertility and Minority Group Survival (Greenwood Press, 1978) (ISBN 0-313-20041-6)
