= Philippa Mary Hoskin =

British historian

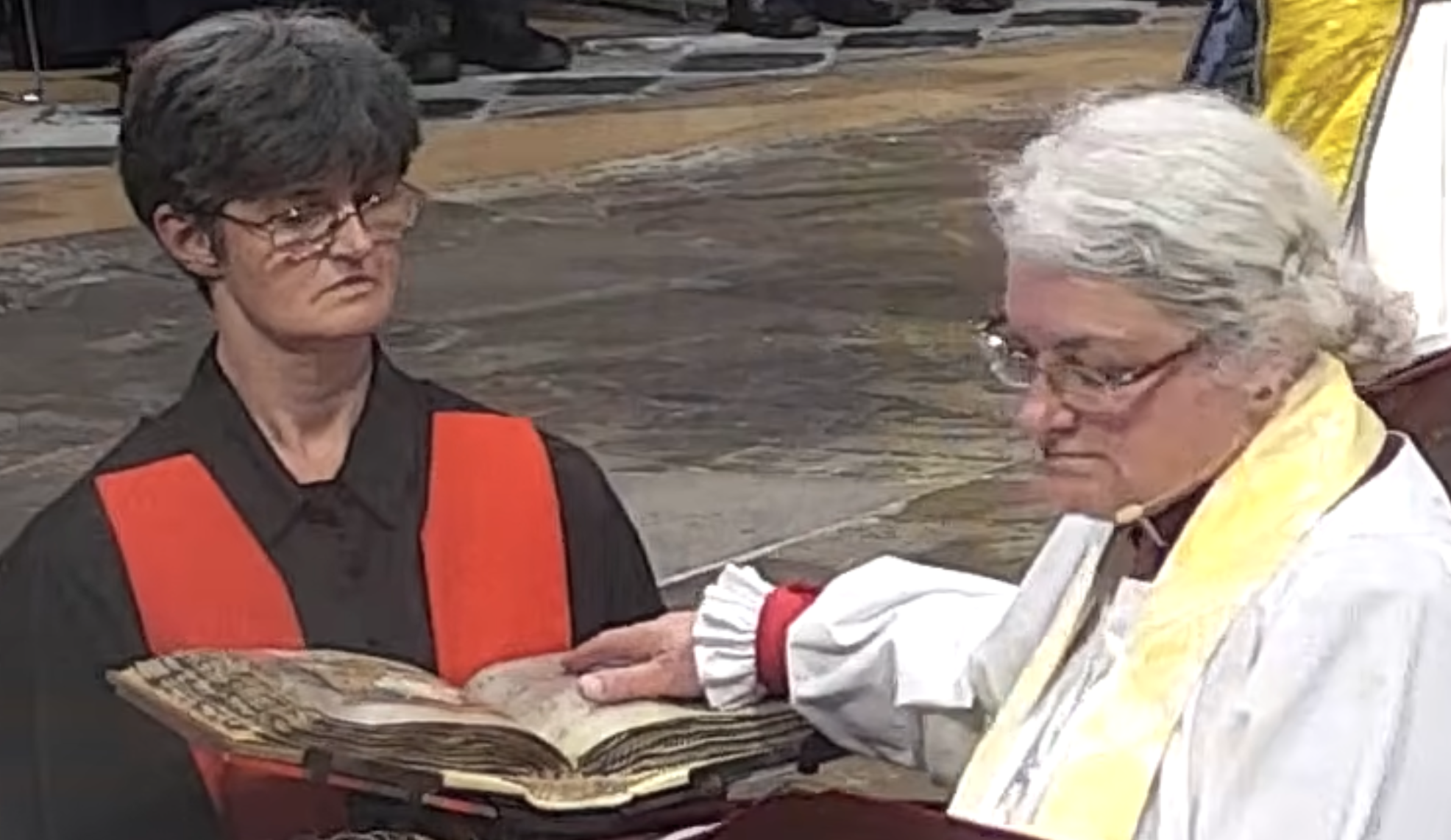
- Philippa Hoskin holding the St Augustine Gospels at the Installation of the Bishop of Ely, June 2026

Academic work
- Main interests: Later Middle Ages

Philippa Mary Hoskin is a British historian of the English Middle Ages, who specializes in the religious, legal and administrative history of the English Church. She is the Fellow Librarian of the Parker Library, Corpus Christi College, Cambridge.

== Career ==
Hoskin studied for a BA in history at Somerville College, Oxford, and was subsequently awarded a doctorate for a thesis which examined the administration of the diocese of Worcester in the thirteenth century.

Between 1995 and 2010 Hoskin worked at the Borthwick Institute for Historical Research, University of York (later, Borthwick Institute for Archives), taking a professional qualification in Archive Administration while there. In 2010 she joined the University of Lincoln, where she developed the teaching of medieval history, becoming the first Professor of Medieval Studies.

In 2019 Hoskin was appointed Director of the Parker Library, Corpus Christi College, Cambridge, where she is the Gaylord and Dorothy Donnelly Fellow Librarian, as well as being a Principal Research Fellow in the Faculty of Divinity, University of Cambridge.

Hoskin holds various professional affiliations and memberships being a fellow of the Royal Historical Society and a Fellow of the Society of Antiquaries. She is the general editor of the British Academy's English Episcopal Acta project (which studies the administration of English medieval diocese from the 11th- to the early 14th-centuries) and of Lincoln Record Society's medieval record series. She was previously general editor for the Canterbury and York Society and is now vice-president. Her most recent work has concerned Robert Grosseteste, bishop of Lincoln and scholar (c.1168–1253), producing both an edited edition of his administrative roll, Robert Grosseteste as Bishop of Lincoln: The Episcopal Rolls 1235–1253, and a monograph about his pastoral care, Robert Grosseteste and the 13th-Century Diocese of Lincoln: An English Bishop's Pastoral Vision (2019).

Hoskin has worked on a number of digital humanities projects including as lead on the Andrew W. Mellon funded Cause Papers in the Diocesan Courts of the Archdiocese of York, 1300-1858: A Database Project and the AHRC funded project Imprint: a forensic and historical investigation of fingerprints on medieval seals.

== Selected bibliography ==
- 'The Bishops of Rome and the Priests of England: Matthew Paris and the Secular Clergy', The Cambridge Companion to Matthew Paris, ed. James Clark (CUP, forthcoming)
- 'Imprints and Identity at Hereford Cathedral: A pilot project on the forensic and historical investigation of handprints on medieval seals', with Elizabeth New, Archives et Bibliothèques de Belgique (2020)
- Robert Grosseteste and the 13th-Century Diocese of Lincoln: An English Bishop's Pastoral Vision (Brill, 2019)
- ‘‘By the impression of my seal'. Medieval identity and bureaucracy: a case-study', with Elizabeth New, The Antiquaries Journal (2019)
- 'The Cloister of the Soul: Robert Grosseteste and the monastic houses of his diocese', in Monastic Life in the Medieval British Isles: Essays in Honour of Janet Burton, ed. Julie Kerr, Emilia Jamroziak and Karen Stöber (University of Wales Press, 2019)
- ‘'By Force and Arms': Lay invasion, the writ de vi laica amovenda and tensions of state and church in the thirteenth and fourteenth centuries', in Petitions and Strategies of Persuasion in the Middle Ages: the English Crown and the Church, eds Thomas W. Smith and Helen Killick (Boydell Press, 2019)
- 'Criminal Clerks and Political Strategists – the English Episcopal Acta Project', in 100 Jahre Germania Sacra Kirchengeschichte schreiben vom 16. bis zum 21. Jahrhundert, ed Hedwig Röckelein (De Gruyter Akademie Forschung, 2018)
- 'Imprint: a forensic and historical investigation of fingerprints on medieval seals', with Elizabeth New, Medieval Prosopography 32 (2018)
- 'Matthew Paris's Chronica Majora and the Franciscans in England', in The English Province of the Franciscans (1224-c.1350), ed. M. Robson (Brill, 2017)
- T he Administrative Rolls of Robert Grosseteste, 1235–1253 (Boydell and Brewer, 2015)
- Robert Grosseteste, natural law and Magna Carta: national and universal law in 1253', I International Journal of Regional and Local History 10:2 (2015)
- 'The Church and the King: canon law and kingship in England 1257–1261', in Records, Government and Administration in the Reign of King Henry III, 1216–1272, ed. D. Crook and L. Wilkinson (Boydell and Brewer, 2015)
- 'Natural Law, Protest and the English Episcopate 1257–1265', Thirteenth-Century England 15 (Boydell and Brewer, 2015)
- 'Robert Grosseteste and the simple benefice: a novel solution to the complexities of lay presentation', Journal of Medieval History 40: 1 (2014)
- 'Durham Priory: consolidation 1189–1380’, in Durham Cathedral: History, Fabric and Culture, ed. D. Brown (Yale University Press, 2014)
- English Episcopal Acta 44: Coventry and Lichfield 1259–1295, with Jeff H. Denton (OUP for the British Academy 2014)
- English Episcopal Acta 43: Coventry and Lichfield 1215–1258, with Jeff H. Denton (OUP for the British Academy 2014)
- 'Cantilupe's crusade? Walter de Cantilupe Bishop of Worcester and the baronial rebellion', Transactions of the Worcestershire Archaeological Society (2012)
- 'Authors of bureaucracy: developing and creating administrative systems in English episcopal chanceries in the second half of the thirteenth century', in Patrons and professionals in the middle ages: proceedings of the 2010 Harlaxton Symposium, eds E.A. New and P. Binski (Paul Watkins / Shaun Tyas, 2012)
- Facsimiles of English episcopal acta 1085-130, with Martin Brett and David M. Smith (OUP for the British Academy, 2012)
- 'Church, state and law: solutions to lay contumacy in the Anglo-Scottish borders during the later thirteenth century', Historical Research 84 (November 2011)
- 'Delineating the Development of English Episcopal Chanceries through the Signification of Excommunication', Tabularia (2011)
- English Episcopal Acta 39: London 1280–1305 (OUP for the British Academy, 2011)
- English Episcopal Acta 38: London 1229–1280 (OUP for the British Academy, 2011)
