= Paolo Mancosu =

Italian-American philosopher

- Born: 1960 (age 65–66)
- Awards: Guggenheim Fellowship, Humboldt Research Award, American Academy of Arts and Sciences

Education
- Education: Catholic University of Milan, Stanford University
- Thesis: Generalizing classical and effective model theory in theories of operations and classes (1989)
- Doctoral advisor: Solomon Feferman

Philosophical work
- Institutions: University of Oxford, Yale University, University of California, Berkeley
- Website: https://philosophy.berkeley.edu/mancosu

Paolo Mancosu is an Italian-American philosopher. He is Slusser Professor of Philosophy at the University of California, Berkeley. He has worked on mathematical logic, the history of logic and mathematics, and the philosophy of mathematics. He has also published extensively on the editorial history of Boris Pasternak's novel Doctor Zhivago.

== Academic career ==
Mancosu received a Laurea degree from the Catholic University of Milan in 1984 and a PhD in philosophy from Stanford University in 1989. His thesis was supervised by Solomon Feferman. He was a Junior Research Fellow at Wolfson College, University of Oxford from 1989 to 1992 and Assistant Professor of Philosophy at Yale University from 1992 to 1995. In 1995 he joined the faculty of the University of California, Berkeley.

Mancosu was a Humboldt Fellow in 1993 and 2017. He received a Guggenheim Fellowship in 2008 and was a member of the Institute for Advanced Study, Princeton, in 2009. In 2022, he held a Blaise Pascal Chair at the University of Paris 1 Pantheon-Sorbonne. In 2026, he was elected to the American Academy of Arts and Sciences. His book Infini, logique, géométrie received the Cavaillès Prize in 2018, and Introduction to proof theory the Shoenfield Prize in 2022.

== Books ==
- Mancosu, Paolo (2026). The wilderness of the infinite: Robert Grosseteste, William of Auvergne, and mathematical infinity in the thirteenth century. Oxford University Press. ISBN 978-0-19-892688-7.
- Mancosu, Paolo, Mugnai, Massimo (2023). Syllogistic logic and mathematical proof. Oxford University Press. ISBN 978-0-19-887692-2.
- Mancosu, Paolo, Galvan, Sergio, Zach, Richard (2021). An introduction to proof theory: normalization, cut-elimination, and consistency proofs. Oxford University Press. doi:10.1093/oso/9780192895936.001.0001.
- Mancosu, Paolo (2017). Abstraction and infinity. Oxford University Press. ISBN 978-0198746829.
- Mancosu, Paolo (2013). Inside the Zhivago storm. The editorial adventures of Pasternak's masterpiece. Feltrinelli. ISBN 978-88-07-99068-7.
- Mancosu, Paolo (2010). The adventure of reason: Interplay between philosophy of mathematics and mathematical logic, 1900–1940. Oxford University Press. doi:10.1093/acprof:oso/9780199546534.001.0001. ISBN 978-019954653-4.
- Mancosu, Paolo, ed. (1998). From Brouwer to Hilbert: the debate on the foundations of mathematics in the 1920s. Oxford University Press. ISBN 978-019509631-6.
- Mancosu, Paolo, ed. (1996). Philosophy of mathematics and mathematical practice in the seventeenth century. Oxford University Press. ISBN 978-019508463-4.
