= Brigitte Miriam Bedos-Rezak =

French medievalist (born 1953)

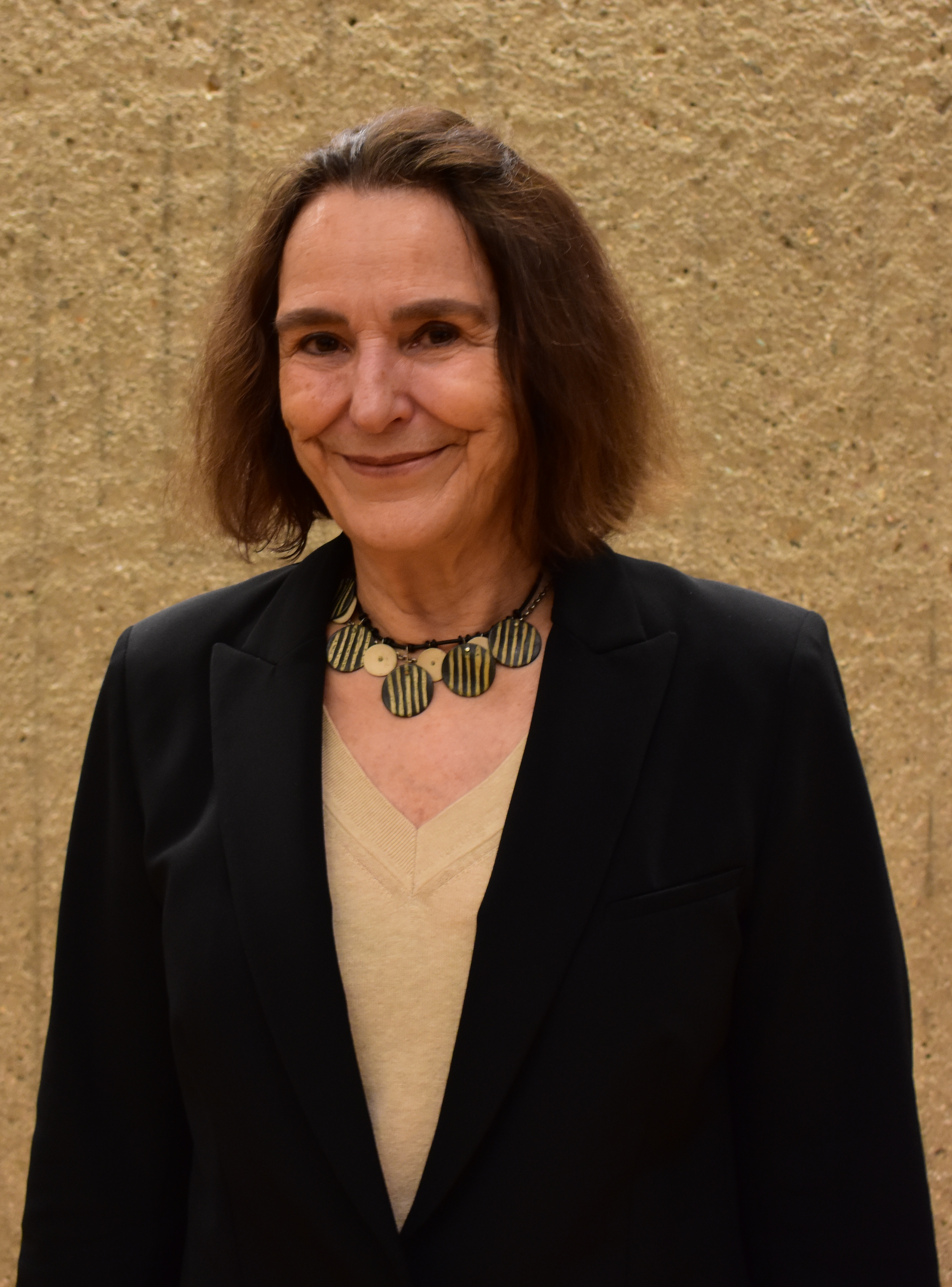
- Bedos-Rezak in 2026
- Born: 1953 (age 72–73)
- Spouse: Ira Loeb Rezak

Academic background
- Education: Paris-Sorbonne University; École nationale des chartes (PhD)
- Thesis: La châtellenie de Montmorency des origines à 1368
- Doctoral advisor: Robert-Henri Bautier

Academic work
- Discipline: Medieval European history
- Sub-discipline: Semiotic anthropology, diplomatics, sigillography
- Institutions: New York University
- Website: https://as.nyu.edu/content/nyu-as/as/faculty/brigitte-bedos-rezak.html

Brigitte Miriam Bedos-Rezak (born 1953) is a French historian of medieval northern France. She has been a professor of history at New York University since 2002.

Bedos-Rezak focuses on medieval seals, studying their cultural significance. She researches how the meaning and significance of seals has changed over time and their relationship with personal and social identity. More generally, she is an expert in semiotics.

== Early life ==
Bedos-Rezak was born in France. She received a baccalauréat in classics from a maison d'éducation de la Légion d'honneur in 1970, a license-ès-lettres in classics and history from Paris-Sorbonne University in 1977, and her Ph.D. in medieval history from the École nationale des chartes in 1977.

== Academic career ==
From 1977 to 1980, Bedos-Rezak was the curator and head of the Central Department of Seals at the Archives Nationales in Paris. On coming to the United States, she was a visiting scholar (1982–85) and Mellon Fellow (1985–87) at the Metropolitan Museum of Art in New York City, an adjunct associate professor of history at Stony Brook University (1985–87), and a visiting associate professor of history at the University of Maryland, College Park (1987–89), before joining the faculty at the University of Maryland as an associate professor in 1989. She became a full professor at UMD in 1994 before moving to New York University as a professor of history there in 2002.

Philippa Hoskin and Elizabeth New called her work on seals as "pioneering", noting how both the matrix and the impression express the owner's will.

== Fellowships and awards ==
In 1984, Bedos-Rezak was awarded a National Endowment for the Humanities Fellowship. In 1985, she was awarded a Andrew W. Mellon Fellowship at the Metropolitan Museum of Art. She participated as a fellow at the School of Historical Studies at the Institute for Advanced Study in 1996–97. In 2007, she was elected a Fellow of the Society of Antiquaries, and, in 2008, she was awarded a John Simon Guggenheim Memorial Fellowship. In 2012, she was made a fellow of the Medieval Academy of America, and was made a fellow of the International Committee on Diplomatics, Comité des sciences historiques, that same year.

Bedos-Rezak was elected a member of the American Philosophical Society in 2025. She has been a visiting professor at the School for Advanced Studies in the Social Sciences (1995), the Center for Medieval and Renaissance Studies at the University of California, Los Angeles (2000), the Department of History at Johns Hopkins University (2000), and the École nationale des chartes (2001).

== Major publications ==
- Form and Order in Medieval France. Studies in Social and Quantitative Sigillography
- "Medieval Identity: A Sign and a Concept," The American Historical Review, 2000
- "Replica: Images of Identity and the Identity of Images," published in The Mind's Eye
- When Ego Was Imago: Signs of Identity in the Middle Ages
