= Susan Silbey =

American sociologist

- Education: University of Chicago
- Known for: Contributions to Sociology of law, Organizational sociology
- Scientific career
- Fields: Sociology, Anthropology
- Workplaces: Wellesley College, Massachusetts Institute of Technology
- Doctoral advisor: David Greenstone, Egon Bittner
- Other academic advisors: Kenneth Prewitt
- Notable students: Vanessa Conzon, Erin York Cornwell

Susan S. Silbey, a sociologist, is the Leon and Anne Goldberg Professor of Humanities, Professor of Sociology and Anthropology, and Professor of Behavioral and Policy Sciences, Sloan School of Management at the Massachusetts Institute of Technology.

Silbey is a researcher on law and the legal process, with specific interest in how legal systems both are implemented and maintained, best known for her work on popular legal consciousness: how ordinary people experience and participate in legal systems. She regularly writes and analyzes legal culture in diverse settings, most recently on governance, regulation, and audit in complex organizations, among other fields. Her current research focuses on the creation of management systems for containing risks: these risks ranging from ethical lapses inside of organizations to environmental, health and safety hazards.

== Biography ==
Silbey was raised in Brooklyn, New York, and attended Erasmus High School. She attended CUNY Brooklyn College as an undergraduate, and received a Bachelor of Arts in political science. She went on to receive a PhD from the University of Chicago in political science under David Greenstone, co-supervised by Egon Bittner, Sociologist at Brandeis University, writing her dissertation on "Consumer Justice: Massachusetts Attorney General's Office of Consumer Protection, 1968–1974."

Silbey was a sociology professor at Wellesley College from 1974 until 2000, when she began a career in MIT's Anthropology department (serving nine years as department head) and the Sloan School of Management. In 2017, Silbey was elected Chair of the Faculty of MIT for a two-year term.

In May 2019 Silbey was named the recipient of the 2019–2020 James R. Killian Jr. Faculty Achievement Award - the highest honour the Institute faculty bestows on one of its members, granted to one professor per year.

In her final column for the MIT Faculty newsletter, Silbey urged the MIT to embrace climate change as the most important priority, saying, "We can no longer engage in business as usual at MIT. Time is running out. MIT, the United States, and the world face an existential threat unprecedented in human history." "

Throughout her career, while studying and working in several disciplines, Silbey has centered her research "on conducting empirical research on how law works. She is preoccupied with understanding what makes the law such a durable and powerful institution, more similar in its fundamental processes across its 4,000 years than any other social institution – including the family, the state, and the economy."

Silbey's husband, Robert J. Silbey (b.1940-d.2011), was a professor of chemistry at MIT and served as the MIT Dean of Science from 2000 to 2007.

== Publications ==
A more complete list of publications can be accessed on Silbey's curriculum vitae (CV) linked from her faculty page.

=== Peer review journal articles (selected) ===
- 2014. The Availability of Law Redux: The Correlation of Rights and Duties. Law and Society Review, 48(2), pp. 297–310.
- Garry C. Gray and Susan S. Silbey. 2014. Governing Inside the Organization: Interpreting Regulation and Compliance. American Journal of Sociology, 120(1), pp. 96–145.
- 2014. The Courts in American Public Culture. Daedulus, the Journal of the American Academy of Arts and Sciences, 143(3), pp. 140–156.
- 2013. "Are You Ready to Listen": A Memorial for Egon Bittner. Ethnographic Studies, 13, pp. 74–81.
- 2011. J. Locke, op. cit.: Invocations of Law on Snowy Streets. Journal of Comparative Law, Vol 5(2), pp. 66–91.
- 2011. The Sociological Citizen: Pragmatic and relational regulation in law and organizations. Regulation & Governance, Volume 5, pp. 14–42.
- Ruthanne Huising and Susan S. Silbey. 2011. Governing the Gap: Forging safe science through relational regulation. Regulation & Governance, Vol 5. pp. 14–42.
- 2009. Taming Prometheus: Talk of Safety and Culture. Annual Review of Sociology, Volume 35, pp. 341–369.
- 2005. After Legal Consciousness. Annual Review of Law and Social Science, Volume 1. December 2005, pp. 323–368.

=== Books ===
- The Common Place of Law: Stories from Everyday Life (with Patricia Ewick) (1998), ISBN 9780226227443
- In Litigation: Do the 'Haves' Still Come Out Ahead (with Herbert Kritzer) (2003), ISBN 9780804747349
- Law and Science (I): Epistemological, Evidentiary, and Relational Engagements, Law and Science (II): Regulation of Property, Practices, and Products (2008), ISBN 9780754625001
