= Keith F. Davis =

Keith F. Davis (born 1952) is an American photography curator, collector, and the author of several books on photography.

Between 1979 and 2005, Davis built the Hallmark Photographic Collection, spanning the history of American photography. In December 2005, the collection was donated to the Nelson-Atkins Museum of Art in Kansas City, Missouri.c At that time, the collection consisted of 6,500 images by 900 artists, with an estimated market value of $65 million. Davis had been the Senior Curator of Photography at the Nelson-Atkins Museum of Art from that time, until his retirement in 2020.

== Publications ==
- An American Century of Photography: From Dry-Plate to Digital, The Hallmark Photographic Collection. Harry N Abrams, 1995. ISBN 978-0810919648
- The Origins of American Photography. Yale University Press, 2007. ISBN 9780300122862.
- The Life and Work of Sid Grossman. Howard Greenberg Library/Steidl: Göttingen, 2017. ISBN 978-3958291256.
