= Gertrude Himmelfarb =

American historian (1922–2019)

- Born: August 8, 1922 New York City, New York, U.S.
- Died: December 30, 2019 (aged 97) Washington, D.C., U.S.
- Education: Brooklyn College (BA); University of Chicago (PhD); Jewish Theological Seminary; Girton College, Cambridge
- Spouse: Irving Kristol (m. 1942; died 2009)
- Children: 2, including Bill
- Relatives: Milton Himmelfarb (brother)

Gertrude Himmelfarb (August 8, 1922 – December 30, 2019), also known as Bea Kristol, was an American historian. She was a leader of conservative interpretations of history and historiography. She wrote extensively on intellectual history, with a focus on Great Britain and the Victorian era, as well as on contemporary society and culture.

== Biography ==
Himmelfarb was born in Brooklyn, New York, the daughter of Bertha (née Lerner) and Max Himmelfarb, both of Russian Jewish background. She received her undergraduate degree from Brooklyn College in 1942 and her doctorate from the University of Chicago in 1950. Himmelfarb later went on to study at the University of Cambridge in the United Kingdom, and the Jewish Theological Seminary in New York.

In 1942, she married Irving Kristol, known as the "godfather" of neoconservatism, and had two children, Elizabeth Nelson and William Kristol, a political commentator and editor of The Weekly Standard. She never changed her last name. Sociologist Daniel Bell wrote that theirs was "the best marriage of our generation" and her husband wrote that he was “astonished how intellectually twinned” the two were “pursuing different subjects while thinking the same thoughts and reaching the same conclusions”.

She was long involved in Jewish conservative intellectual circles. Professor Emerita at the Graduate School of the City University of New York, she was the recipient of many awards and honorary degrees. She served on the Council of Scholars of the Library of Congress, the Council of Academic Advisors of the American Enterprise Institute, and the Council of the National Endowment for the Humanities. She was a Fellow of the British Academy and of the American Academy of Arts and Sciences, and a member of the American Philosophical Society. In 1991, she delivered the Jefferson Lecture under the auspices of the National Endowment for the Humanities. In 2004, she was awarded the National Humanities Medal by President George W. Bush. Himmelfarb died from heart failure at her home in Washington on December 30, 2019, at the age of 97.

== Historiography ==
Himmelfarb long nurtured the neoconservative movement in U.S. politics and intellectual life; her husband, Irving Kristol, helped found the movement.

Himmelfarb was a leading defender of traditional historical methods and practices. Her book, The New History and the Old (published in 1987 and revised and expanded in 2004), is a critique of the varieties of "new history" that have sought to displace the old. The "New Histories" she critiqued include: quantitative history that presumes to be more "scientific" than conventional history, but relies on partial and dubious data; Marxist historiography derived from economic assumptions and class models that leave little room for the ideas and beliefs of contemporaries or the protagonists and events of history; psychoanalytic history dependent on theories and speculations that violate the accepted criteria of historical evidence; analytic history that reduces history to a series of isolated "moments" with no overriding narrative structure; social history, "history from the bottom", that denigrates the role of politics, nationality, and individuals (the "great men" of history); and, later, postmodernist history, which denies even the ideal of objectivity, viewing all of history as a "social construct" on the part of the historian.

Himmelfarb criticized A.J.P. Taylor for seeking to "demoralize" history in his 1961 book The Origins of the Second World War, and for refusing to recognize "moral facts" about interwar Europe. Himmelfarb maintained that Taylor was wrong to treat Adolf Hitler as a "normal" German leader playing by the traditional rules of diplomacy in The Origins of the Second World War, instead of being a "world-historical" figure such as Napoleon.

Himmelfarb energetically rejected postmodern academic approaches:

[Postmodernism in history] is a denial of the objectivity of the historian, of the factuality or reality of the past, and thus of the possibility of arriving at any truths about the past. For all disciplines it induces a radical skepticism, relativism, and subjectivism that denies not this or that truth about any subject but the very idea of truth – that denies even the ideal of truth, truth is something to aspire to even if it can never be fully attained.

== Ideas ==
Himmelfarb was best known as a historian of Victorian England. Himmelfarb argued "for the reintroduction of traditional values such as shame, responsibility, chastity, and self-reliance, into American political life and policy-making".

In an obituary, David Brooks described Himmelfarb as "The Historian of Moral Revolution".

== Bibliography ==
=== Books ===
- Lord Acton: A Study of Conscience and Politics (1952) OCLC 3011425
- Darwin and the Darwinian Revolution (1959) online free
- Victorian Minds (1968) OCLC 400777
- On Liberty and Liberalism: The Case of John Stuart Mill (1974) OCLC 805020
- The Idea of Poverty: England in the Early Industrial Age (1984) online free
- Marriage and Morals Among the Victorians (1986) online free
- The New History and the Old (1987, 2004) online free
- Poverty and Compassion: The Moral Imagination of the Late Victorians (1991) online free
- On Looking into the Abyss: Untimely Thoughts on Culture and Society (1994) online free
- The De-Moralization of Society: From Victorian Virtues to Modern Values (1995) OCLC 30474640
- One Nation, Two Cultures (1999) OCLC 40830208
- The Moral Imagination: From Adam Smith to Lionel Trilling (2005), Rowman & Littlefield Publishers
- The Roads to Modernity: The British, French, and American Enlightenments. 2008 [2004]. OCLC 53091118.
- The Moral Imagination: From Edmund Burke to Lionel Trilling (2006) OCLC 61109330
- The Jewish Odyssey of George Eliot (2009) OCLC 271080989
- The People of the Book: Philosemitism in England, from Cromwell to Churchill (Encounter Books, 2011) OCLC 701019524
- Past and Present: The Challenges of Modernity, from the Pre-Victorians to the Postmodernists. Encounter Books. 2017.

Edited

- Lord Acton, Essays on Freedom and Power (Free Press, 1948) OCLC 1052339
- Milton Himmelfarb, Jews and Gentiles (Encounter Books, 2007) OCLC 70883212
- Irving Kristol, The Neoconservative Persuasion (Basic Books, 2011) online free
- Thomas Robert Malthus, Essay on Population (Modern Library, 1960) OCLC 4901335 — as editor
- John Stuart Mill, Essays on Politics and Culture (Doubleday, 1962) OCLC 193217
- John Stuart Mill, On Liberty (Penguin, 1974) OCLC 1941475
- Alexis de Tocqueville, Memoir on Pauperism (Ivan Dee, 1997) OCLC 36719602
- The Spirit of the Age: Victorian Essays (Yale University Press, 2007) OCLC 171111099

=== Critical studies and reviews of Himmelfarb's work ===
Past and present

- Mingardi, Alberto (January–February 2018). "Gertrude Himmelfarb and the resonance of history". Quadrant. 62 (1–2 [543]): 18–21.
