= Sociography =

Sociography is writing on society, societal sub-divisions and societal patterns, done without first conducting the in-depth study typically required in the academic field of sociology. The term was coined by the Dutch sociologist Sebald Rudolf Steinmetz in 1913.

Sociography typically takes the form of loose commentary, although it may also be found as portions of novels that depict life in a given society. Much of the sociography currently in print focuses on society sub-groups, such as ethnic, neighborhood or occupational-geographic groupings.

== Conflict on scope of the field ==
Some sociographers, such as Patrick Geddes, contend that sociography is more properly considered only as the limited combination of sociology and geography. It is unclear whether this would also apply where the sub-society under study is not geographically limited.

== Recent history ==
Sociography has taken on increasing importance in recent years, as many authors have begun to speak out on issues of race and culture. Although their writing is done without benefit of academic study, it is still considered a valid explication of a given cultural regime.

Within social science departments in many universities, sociography is now considered a meta-discipline, combining the study of literature, sociology, politics of culture, and economics.

== Notable sociographical works ==
- Sebald Rudolf Steinmetz, "Die Stellung der Soziographie in der Reihe der Geisteswissenschaften", Archiv für Rechts- und Wirtschaftsphilosophie, Vol. 6, No. 3 (1912/1913), pp. 492-501
- "The Sociography of Musical Life in Industrialised Countries - A Research Task", The World of Music, Vol. 21, No. 3 (1979), pp. 78-86 (musicians in industrialized countries)
- Marie Jahoda, Paul F. Lazarsfeld, Hans Zeisel, Christian Fleck, Die Arbeitslosen von Marienthal (1932; English ed. 1971 – Marienthal: the sociography of an unemployed community – paperback by Transaction Publishers in USA, 2002) (areas of high unemployment rates)
